= Granton Trawler =

1934 film by John Grierson

- Directed by: John Grierson
- Cinematography: John Grierson
- Edited by: Edgar Anstey
- Distributed by: British Instructional Films (BIF)
- Release date: 1934
- Running time: 10:58 minutes
- Country: United Kingdom

Granton Trawler was one of the only films that John Grierson directed himself for the Empire Marketing Board/GPO Film Unit. The documentary style film was made in 1934, and was noted for its experimental use of sound without voice over.

== Synopsis ==
The film is about the "Isabella Grieg" which was a fishing trawler that traveled from Granton Harbour to through the east coast of Edinburgh, then to the fishing grounds between Shetland and Norway.

== Legacy ==
Russian filmmaker Andrei Tarkovsky listed it as one of the 77 masterpieces of world cinema.
