= Documentary Film Movement =

Group of British film-makers

The Documentary Film Movement is the group of British filmmakers, led by John Grierson, who were influential in British film culture in the 1930s and 1940s.

== Principles ==
The founding principles of the movement were based on Grierson's views of documentary film. He wished to use film to educate citizens in an understanding of democratic society.

== History ==
The movement began at the Film Unit of the Empire Marketing Board in 1930. The unit was headed by John Grierson, who appointed apprentices such as Basil Wright, Arthur Elton, Edgar Anstey, Stuart Legg, Paul Rotha and Harry Watt. These filmmakers were mostly young, middle-class, educated males with liberal political views. In 1933, the film unit was transferred to the General Post Office.

From 1936, the movement began to disperse and divisions emerged. Whereas previously the documentary film movement had been located in a single public sector organisation, it separated in the late 1930s into different branches, as filmmakers explored other possibilities for developing documentary film. By 1937, the movement was spread across four different production units: GPO, Shell (headed by Anstey), Strand (headed by Rotha) and Realist (led by Wright).

In 1939, Grierson left Britain to work with the National Film Board of Canada, where he remained until 1945. In 1940, the GPO Film Unit was transferred to the Ministry of Information and renamed the Crown Film Unit.

== See also ==
- Documentary News Letter
