= Forsyth Hardy =

Scottish critic, writer and film administrator

- Born: Henry Forsyth Hardy; 12 February 1910; Bathgate, Scotland
- Died: 24 May 1994 (aged 84); Edinburgh, Scotland
- Spouse: Margaret Fisher

Henry Forsyth Hardy (12 February 1910 – 24 May 1994) was a Scottish critic, writer and film administrator.

== Biography ==
Henry Forsyth Hardy was born in Bathgate, West Lothian on 12 February 1910. He co-founded the Edinburgh Film Guild in 1929. Hardy started his career as an office bearer in the Edinburgh Film Guild, Scottish Film Council and the Federation of Scottish Film Societies. He was working as a reporter for The Scotsman in 1930, where he wrote a review of John Grierson's Drifters, Grierson enjoyed the review that he went to speak with Hardy.

In 1932 he became The Scotsman's first film critic, and after ten years with the company, he left to become head of information at the Scottish Office. Hardy was one of the founders of the British Film Institute in 1933, and also a founding member of the Scottish Film Council in 1934. Hardy was also a co-founder of the Edinburgh International Film Festival in 1947.

From 1953-75, Hardy was the first Director for the Films of Scotland committee; he worked on 140 films during his time with the committee. He was put in charge of overseeing John Grierson's work on the documentary Seawards The Great Ships which was released in 1961. Seawards was the first Scottish film to win an Academy Award during the 1962 award ceremony.

Hardy then left the Films of Scotland committee to become the first secretary of the Scottish Film Directors Fund.

== Cinema Quarterly ==
Hardy co-founded the Cinema Quarterly with Norman Wilson in Edinburgh in 1932, people also contributed to the paper, and this included Paul Rotha, Basil Wright and John Grierson. The quarterly continued before it stopped circulating under Cinema Quarterly in 1935; however, in its later years, it had notable contributions from Graham Greene, T.S. Eliot and Aldous Huxley.

In 1936 the name of the magazine changed to World Film News and Television Progress in 1936, it then had a final change of name to SEE: World Film News for three issues before publication of the magazine ceased.

== Bibliography ==
=== Books ===
Grierson on Documentary (1946)

Scandinavian Film (1 January 1952)

John Grierson: A Documentary Biography (28 February 1979)

John Grierson on Scotland (1979)

Grierson on the Movies (2 March 1981)

Scotland in Film (21 June 1990)

Slightly Mad and Full of Dangers: The Story of the Edinburgh Film Festival (31 December 1992)

=== Co-authored ===
Twenty Years of British Film 1925-45 (1947)

=== Journals ===
Filmgoers' Review: A Pictorial Survey Of The Year's Films (1945-7)

=== Articles and Book Chapters ===
"Planning", in W.M. Ballantine (ed.), Scotland's Record, The Albyn Press (1946)

"Fourteenth Edinburgh Film Festival", Saltire Review, Vol. 6, No. 22, Autumn 1960

Review of The Projection of Britain by P.M. Taylor, in Cencrastus No. 10, Autumn 1982
