= Documentary News Letter =

Former magazine about documentary film

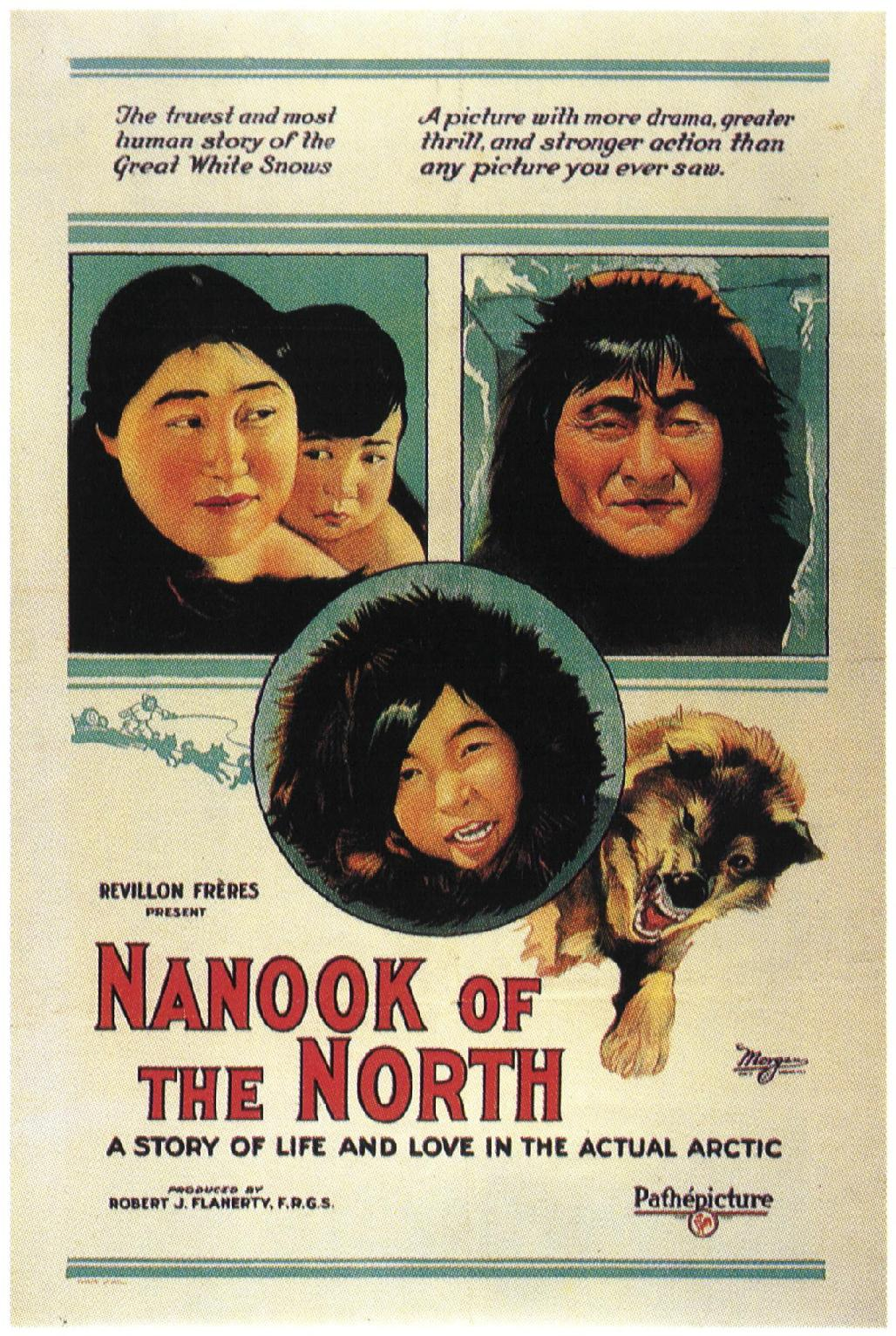
- Documentary News Letter
- Founder: John Grierson
- First issue: January 1940
- Final issue: 1949
- Country: United Kingdom
- Language: English
- OCLC: 9835272

Documentary News Letter was a magazine about documentary film founded by filmmaker John Grierson. The publication was developed as the wartime successor to World Film News, which ceased publication in 1938, and sought to promote a "documentary approach to everyday living." It published its first edition in January 1940, with an editorial board that consisted of Grierson, Paul Rotha, Basil Wright, Arthur Elton and Thomas Baird. (Note: "Documentary News Letter". Cinema St. Andrews. University of St Andrews. 2013-04-23. Archived from the original on 2014-02-23.)

Documentary News Letter featured editorials and film reviews written by members of the Documentary Film Movement. Wright has stated that the magazine was influential during the Second World War, influencing the Ministry of Information's approach to film propaganda. In its reviews, Documentary News Letter was particularly critical of films which it considered "inauthentic", notably films directed by Humphrey Jennings.
