= Pett and Pott =

- Directed by: Alberto Cavalcanti
- Written by: Alberto Cavalcanti; Stuart Legg
- Story by: Humphrey Jennings
- Produced by: John Grierson
- Starring: J. M Reeves; Majorie Fone; June Godfrey
- Cinematography: John Taylor
- Edited by: Richard McNaughton
- Music by: Walter Leigh
- Production company: GPO Film Unit
- Release date: 1934
- Running time: 29 minutes
- Country: United Kingdom
- Language: English

Pett and Pott (subtitled A Fairy Story of the Suburbs) is a 1934 British short film directed by Alberto Cavalcanti and produced by John Grierson under the auspices of the GPO Film Unit. It was written by Cavalcanti and Stuart Legg.

== Synopsis ==
In suburbia, Mrs Pett is seen using the house's telephone for transactions and personal calls. Mrs Pott prefers to invest her money in a maid. As she trudges up steps with heavy shopping, the calendar flicks through the days, while the same image is shown over a monotonous drum beat. The maid invites a friend round and the two of them begin to steal from the Potts' household. The noises they make alert the Petts' daughter, who uses the telephone to call the police. In court the Potts are condemned for their decadent behaviour, whilst the Petts – and the telephone – are praised.

== Production ==
Made to promote wider use of the telephone, Pett and Pott is a satirical comedy based around two contrasting suburban families who live next door to each other. While virtuous Mrs Pett looks after the home and tends to her children, decadent Mrs Pott prefers to idle in her chair reading a saucy book.

Cavalcanti had established a name for himself making avant-garde films in the 1930s. and managed to smuggle a number of sound and visual experiments into a rather light storyline. The first 'experimental' sequence occurs when we see Mr Pett (a solicitor) and Mr Pott (a debt collector) on the train with other businessmen dressed in identical suits and bowler hats. In another, Mrs Pott is seen becoming a slave to her own maid. A close-up of a newspaper headline 'Another Suburban Burglary', is followed by a cut to a woman awaking in her bed screaming – her scream merging with the noise of a train going through a tunnel.

== Cast ==
- J. M. Reeves as Mr Petter
- Majorie Fone as Mrs Petter
- June Godfrey as Polly Pett
- Bruce Winston as the judge
- Eric Hudson as Mr Pott
- Barbara Nixon as Mrs Pott
- Jack Scott as the burglar
- Alberto Calvalcanti as J. Leviticus
- Humphrey Jennings as grocer
- Stuart Legg as Admiral
- Basil Wright as vicar
- Valeska Gert

== Reception ==
In 1977, The Monthly Film Bulletin wrote: "The film was conceived as an exercise to familiarise GPO staff with their new sound equipment at Blackheath: the soundtrack was recorded first and images had to be found to fit. Inevitably, the results seem much less experimental now. ... The film's most striking aspect now is its use of fantasy to put over the vague propaganda message about the boundless benefits to be obtained from a telephone. As in Went the Day Well?, Cavalcanti views English life with the sharp eyes of a foreign observer, and one experienced in viewing ordinary events from a surreal perspective (the presence of Valeska Gert, playing the maid, reinforces the connections with the director's avant-garde days in France; originally Catherine Hessling was to take the part with Gert as Mrs. Pott). ... Yet the need to match up with the soundtrack acts as a brake on the fantasy. In other Cavalcanti jeux d'esprit the camerawork and editing boost the conceits, but here the actors bear much of the burden unaided."

Time Out wrote: If you can imagine Un Chien Andalou reworked by Gilbert and Sullivan, you'll have the flavour of this unlikely product of the Grierson-supervised GPO Film Unit. Subtitled 'A fairy story of the suburbs', it's a satirical-ironical-irrational reverie, which contrasts the virtuous Pett family (who have a phone) with the disgraceful Potts (who don't). The latter are gleefully portrayed as the embodiment of everything un-suburban, with their libidinous continental ways and laxity with the hired help. Made for a pittance, it's radical, fun and probably left its sponsors aghast."

== Home media ==
This film is included in the BFI DVD compilation Addressing The Nation: The GPO Film Unit Collection Volume 1.
