= Stephen Tallents =

British civil servant (1884–1958)

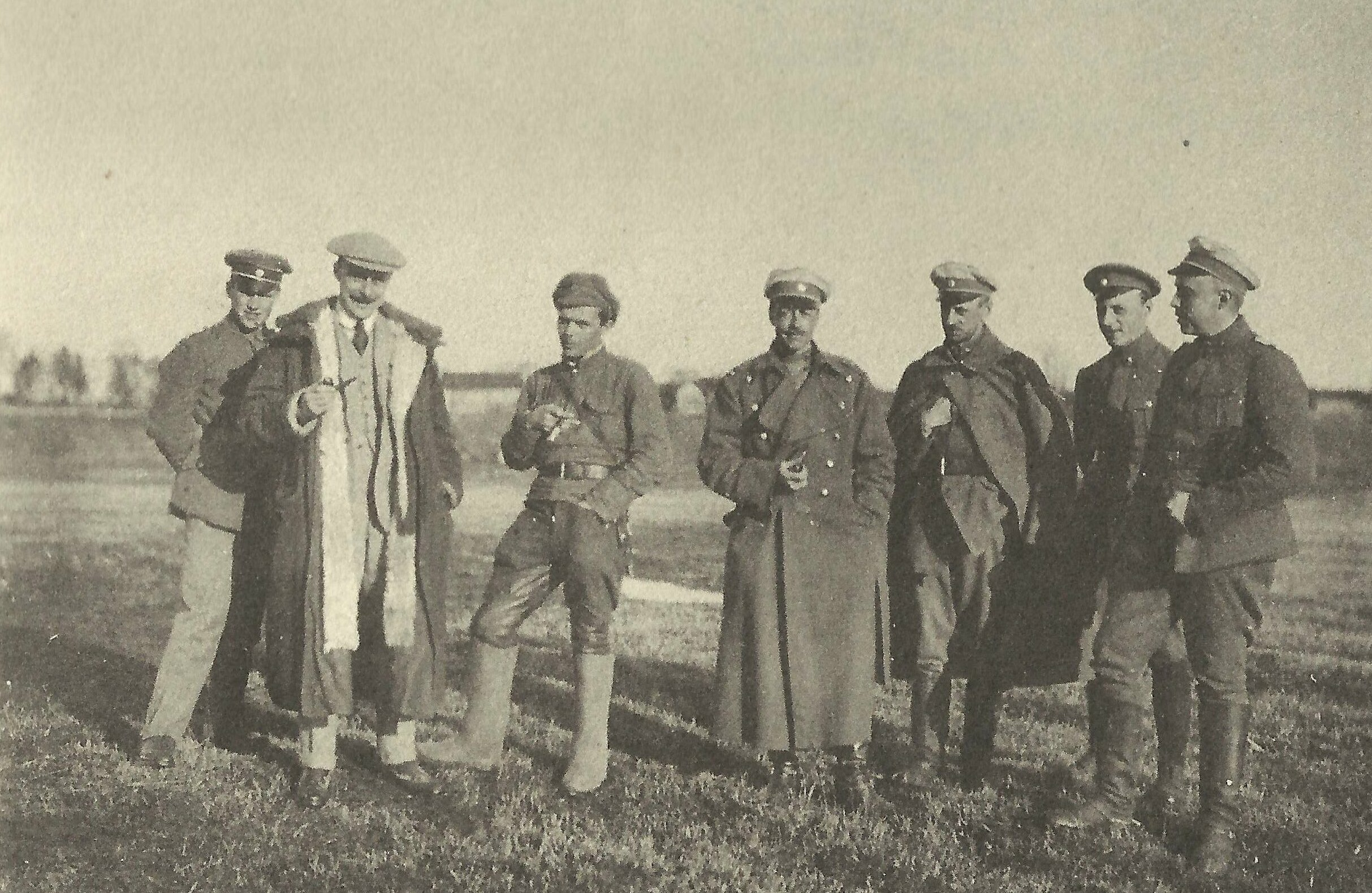
Meeting at Zilupe, Latvia in March 1920 with Stephen Tallents second from left

Sir Stephen George Tallents KCMG CB CBE (20 October 1884 – 11 September 1958) was a British civil servant and public relations expert.

== Biography ==
Born in London, Tallents was educated at Harrow and Balliol. He began his career as a civil servant at the Board of Trade in 1909 before being transferred to assist William Beveridge and Hubert Llewellyn Smith in establishing labour exchanges. He was commissioned in August 1914 and served as an officer in the Irish Guards in World War I until severely wounded at Festubert. He then worked at the Ministry of Munitions, transferring in 1916 to the Ministry of Food.

In 1918 he became chief delegate for the Supply of Relief to Poland. In February 1919 he was appointed British Commissioner for the Baltic Provinces during the British intervention in that region and helped draw up the treaty that established Estonia, Latvia and Lithuania. He adjudicated on the line of the border between Estonia and Latvia, which included dividing the town of Valga/Valka. He was secretary to the last Lord-Lieutenant of Ireland, Lord FitzAlan and was then Imperial Secretary for Northern Ireland, 1922 to 1926.

He is best known for his work as the secretary of the Empire Marketing Board (EMB) between 1926 and 1933. There he employed the British documentary film-maker John Grierson and commissioned artists including: Clive Gardiner, E. McKnight Kauffer, and Frank Newbould to produce a series of large posters, promoting British and Empire produce. Following the demise of the EMB in 1933 Tallents moved to the GPO, transferring the EMB's film unit with him which led to the GPO Film Unit's production of classic documentaries such as Night Mail. Tallents went on to work for the BBC as its first Controller of Public Relations and Deputy Director General under Lord Reith.

In World War II his experience was employed at the Ministry of Information. In 1948 he became founder President of the Institute of Public Relations.

Stephen Tallents was awarded the CB in 1918, the CBE in 1920, made Companion of the Order of St Michael and St George in 1929, and knighted in 1932 as Knight Commander of the Order of St Michael and St George.

Tallents was a guest on Desert Island Discs on the BBC Home Service on 11 October 1943.

He gave St John's Jerusalem at Sutton-at-Hone, Kent, to the National Trust in 1943.

== Bibliography ==
- Sir Stephen Tallents, Man and Boy by Faber & Faber, (1943)
- Scott Anthony, Public Relations and the Making of Modern Britain: Stephen Tallents and the Birth of a Progressive Media Profession. Manchester University Press (2013) ISBN 9780719090042
