= Arthur Elton =

Arthur Elton may refer to:

- Sir Arthur Elton, 7th Baronet (1818–1883), Member of Parliament for Bath 1857–1859
- Sir Arthur Elton, 10th Baronet (1906–1973), pioneer of the British documentary film industry
