= John Taylor (documentary filmmaker) =

British documentary filmmaker (1914–1992)

John Elston Taylor
- Born: 5 October 1914; Kentish Town, London, England
- Died: 15 September 1992 (aged 77); London, England
- Occupation: Filmmaker
- Notable work: The Conquest of Everest, The Song of Ceylon, Letter from Aldershot, Daybreak in Udi
- Spouse: Barbara Mullen

John Elston Taylor (5 October 1914 – 15 September 1992) was a British documentary filmmaker.

== Early life ==
Born in Kentish Town, London, on 5 October 1914, John Taylor had originally set his sights on a career in carpentry; however, shortly after finishing school he was offered a job by his sister's husband, documentary filmmaker John Grierson.

== Career ==
Taylor started work as a film assistant at the Empire Marketing Board and in the years that followed he tried his hand at such jobs as camera operator, assistant director and production assistant. Along with working on Grierson's works, Taylor also had the fortune of working alongside some of his colleagues, such as Basil Wright (Song of Ceylon, 1934), Robert Flaherty (Man of Aran, 1934) and Alberto Cavalcanti on several of his travel documentaries, such as Men of the Alps (1937). By the end of the 1930s, Taylor was directing films himself, including Smoke Menace (1937) and Londoners (1939).

In the 1940s, Taylor began producing films which helped to expose and improve social issues: Margaret Thomson's Clean Milk (1943) helped improve the Scottish dairy industry; Alex Strasser's Your Children's Eyes (1945) showed how a child's squint could easily be corrected with a minor operation; Daybreak in Udi (d. Terry Bishop, 1949) followed the construction of a maternity hospital in a village in Eastern Nigeria.

In 1952, Taylor and Leon Clore set up Countryman Films, a company which made natural history documentaries. Their greatest achievement was probably The Conquest of Everest (d. Thomas Stobbart, 1953), a record of the successful British Everest expedition of 1953 accomplished by John Hunt, Sir Edmund Hillary and Tenzing Norgay.

Taylor was involved in a vast number of documentary films that became classics of the genre. He continued working up to the 1980s, producing quality documentaries on themes of social welfare and conservation.

== Personal life ==
His wife was actress Barbara Mullen, whom he married in 1941. The couple had two daughters.

== Death ==
Taylor died on 15 September 1992, in London, England.

== Selected filmography ==
- The Song of Ceylon (1934) (Assistant director)
- Housing Problems (1935) (Cinematographer)
- Island People (1940) (Producer)
- Letter from Aldershot (1940) (Director)

== See also ==
- Documentary film
