= Quarry Hill, Leeds =

Area of Leeds, West Yorkshire, England

Coordinates: 53.798°N 1.531°W

Quarry Hill is an area of central Leeds, West Yorkshire, England. It is bounded by the Leeds Inner Ring Road in the east and north and the Leeds – York / Hull railway in the south. The area falls within the City and Hunslet ward of Leeds City Council.

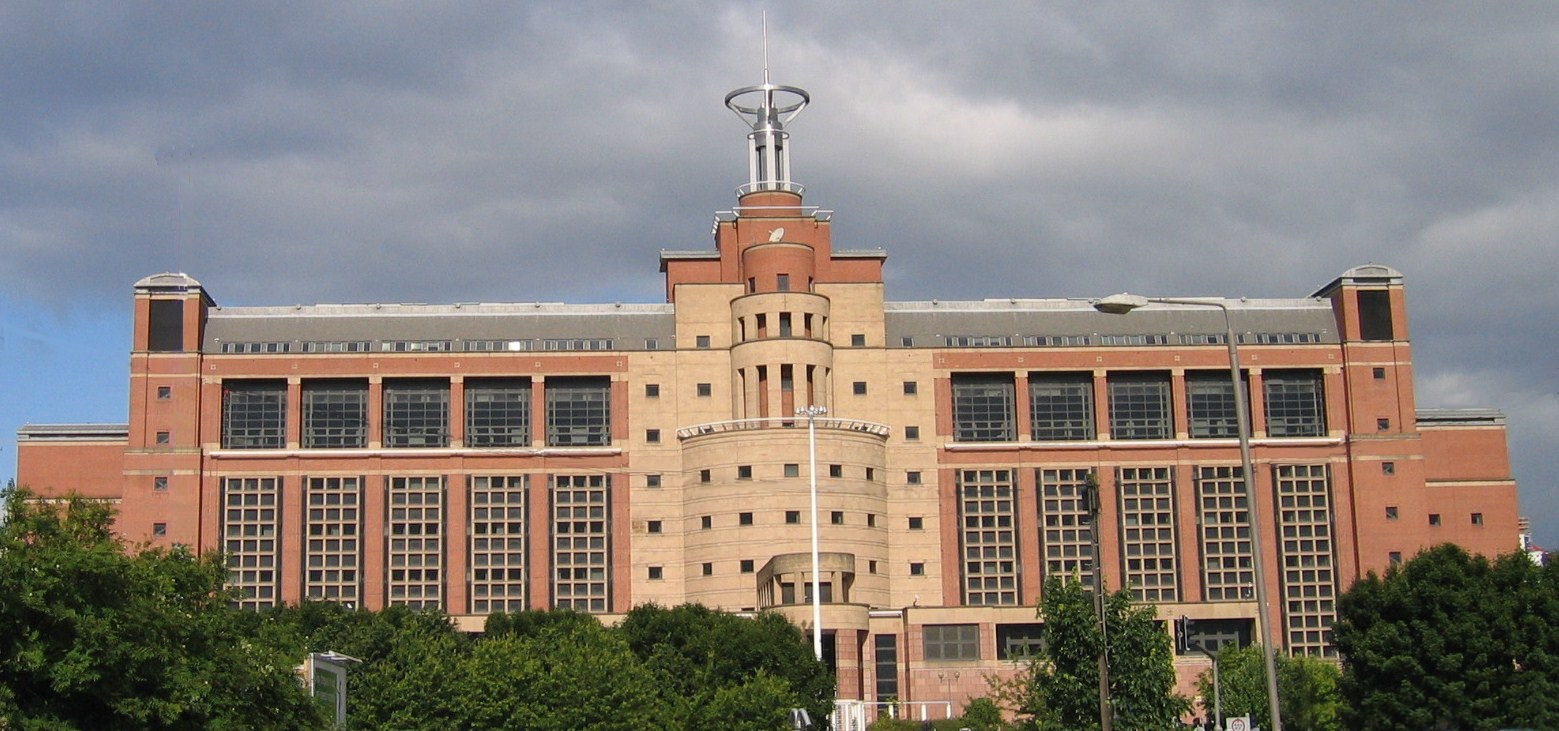
Quarry House at Quarry Hill

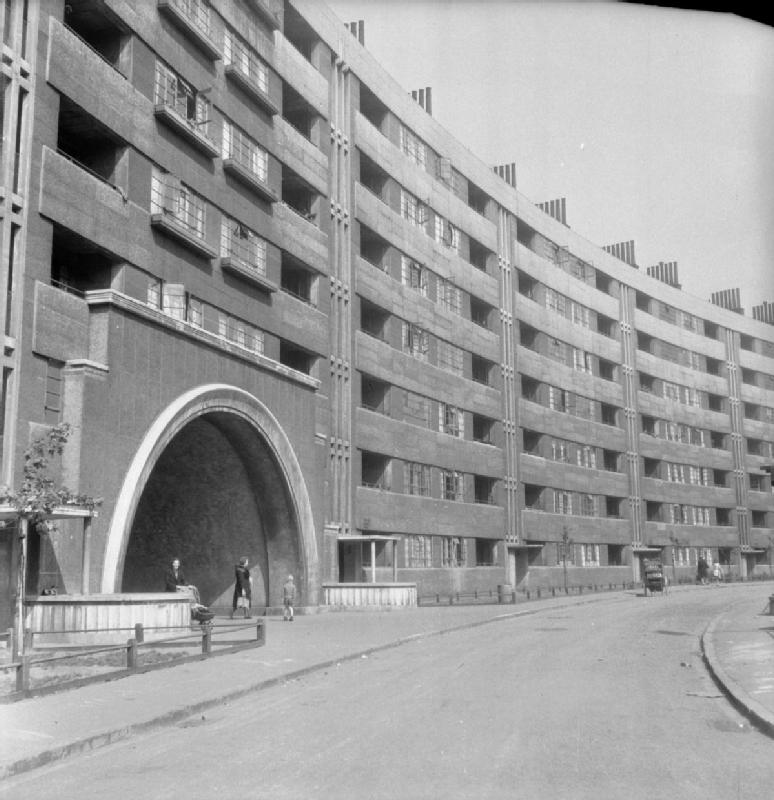
Quarry Hill Flats in 1943

== History ==
Quarry Hill was originally an inner-city area of Leeds.

Three churches have historically been located on Quarry Hill. The Old Boggart House was the first purpose-built Methodist chapel in Leeds. It was demolished following the opening of the adjacent St Peter's Chapel in 1834. The site is marked by a blue plaque on the steps leading to the Leeds Playhouse.

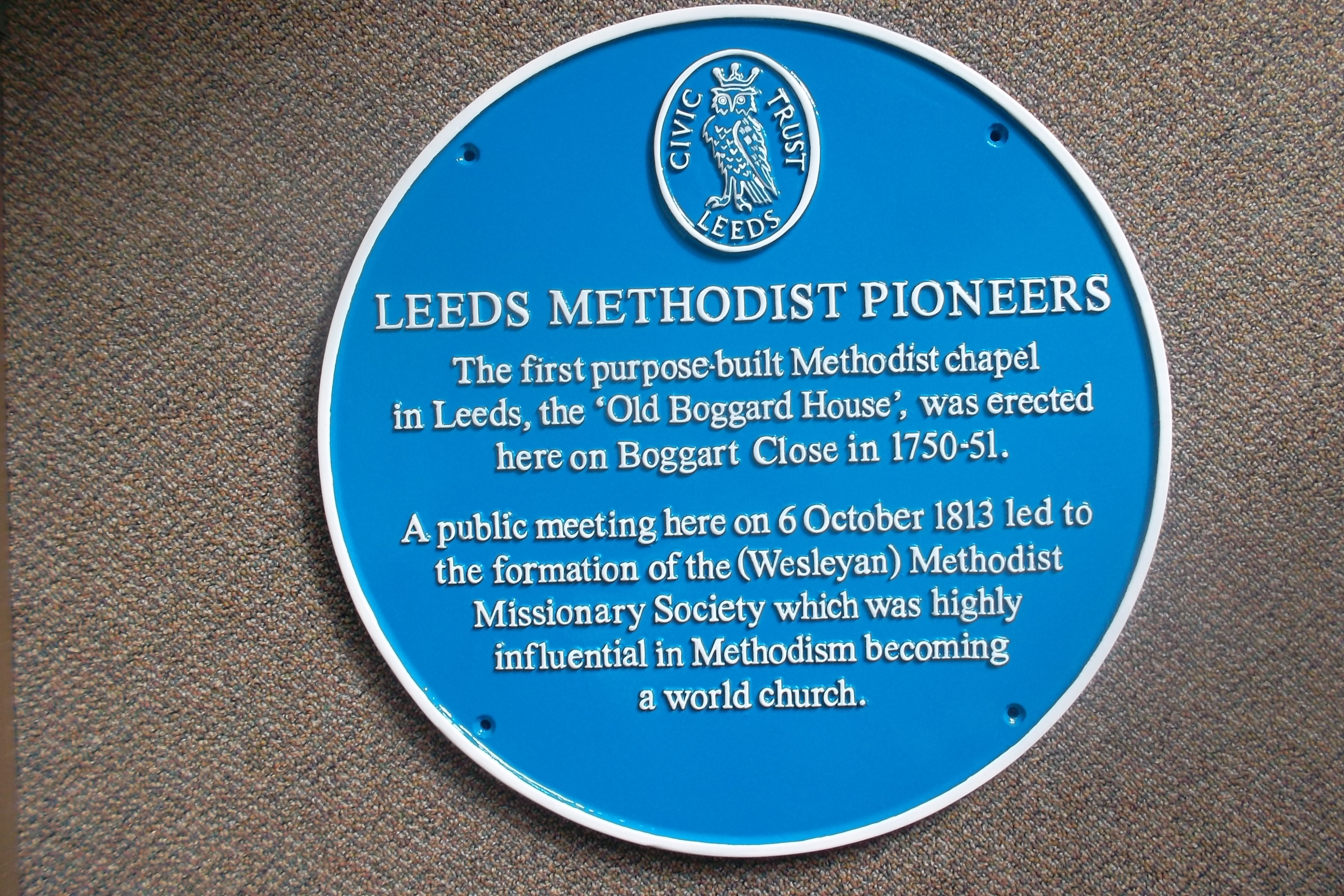
Leeds Methodist Pioneers Plaque

Quarry Hill Ebenezer Primitive Methodist chapel, originally called "Chapel Street Chapel", was opened in 1822, new frontage was added in 1846 and the chapel was enlarged in 1874. It closed in 1933. St Mary's Church, a Commissioners' Church, architect Thomas Taylor, was located on St Mary's Street. Located on the top of the hill, looking over New York Road towards the city centre, and known both as "St. Mary's Mabgate" and "St. Mary's Quarry Hill", the site is now a Diocesan Office. The Sunday school remains, as does the burial ground, a green area sloping down to Mabgate. A past resident of the Quarry Hill area was Mary Fitzpatrick, a robber and suspected murderer.

Between 1938 and 1978 Quarry Hill was the location of what was at the time the largest social housing complex in the United Kingdom. The building was designed in 1934 by R. A. H. Livett (1898–1959), the Director of Housing and later City Architect for Leeds. Its design was strongly influenced by modernist developments in Europe, specifically the Karl-Marx-Hof in Vienna, Austria, and La Cité de la Muette in Paris, France. The development was noted for its sheer size and modernist design. It had then radical and modern features such as solid fuel ranges, electric lighting, a state-of-the-art refuse disposal system (Garchey) and communal facilities including a swimming pool. Due to social problems and poor maintenance, the Quarry Hill Flats were demolished in 1978.

== Current ==
Since the 1980s, Quarry Hill has been a focus for regeneration within Leeds, and today is home to the West Yorkshire Playhouse, now known as Leeds Playhouse, which opened in 1990; Yorkshire Dance, established in 1982; Quarry House (a Department of Health and Department for Work and Pensions building with a social/leisure complex, which opened in 1993); the BBC Yorkshire building; the Leeds Conservatoire (formerly Leeds College of Music); and the Northern Ballet building which opened in 2010. Centenary Square and the Playhouse Square are located at Quarry Hill. The regeneration has seen Quarry Hill become disassociated with East Leeds, and become part of central Leeds.

Quarry House was constructed on the site of the former Quarry Hill Flats.

Leeds City College built a creative arts and health, care and public services campus, designed by Ellis Williams Architects, on the north-west of the site; this opened in September 2019. Part of the college building is used by Leeds Conservatoire.

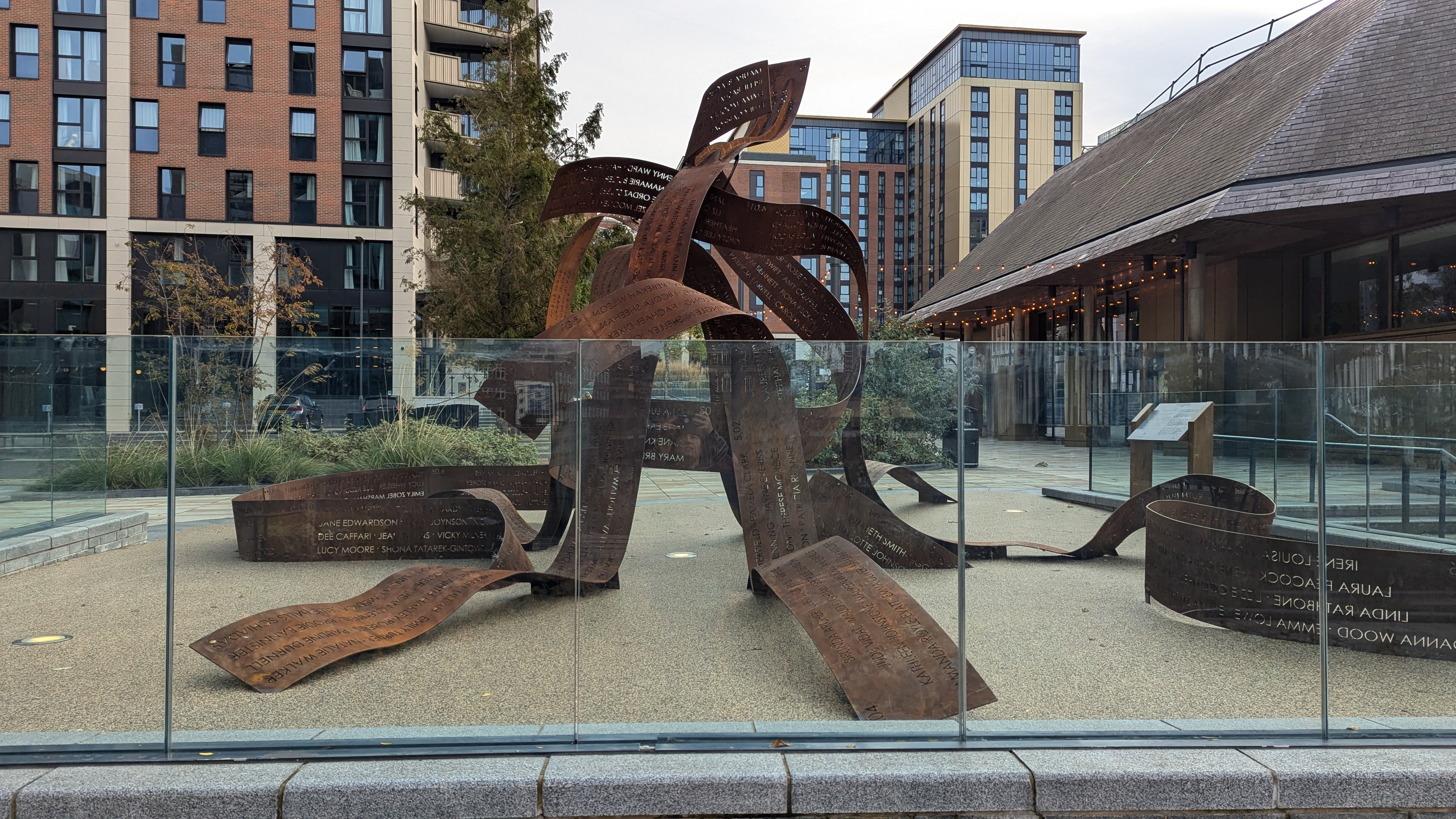
Ribbons sculpture by Pippa Hale, looking up the hill

The sculpture Ribbons, by Pippa Hale, sits on the site.

== In the media ==
- The flats were shown in the opening sequence of the popular 1970s sitcom Queenie's Castle (1970–72) which starred Diana Dors.
- The Peter May novel Runaway has scenes set in the housing project in 1965 and in its later transformation c. 2015.
- Quarry Hill also features in Charles Stross's 2016 novel The Nightmare Stacks.
- The complete Quarry Hill development in architects' model form can be seen in the 1935 film Housing Problems, a key work of the Documentary Film Movement which is also featured as an extra on BBC DVD release of the influential 1966 TV play Cathy Come Home.

Quarry Hill is the area where the nurses work in The Steeple Street Trilogy by Donna Douglas. "Agnes finds herself facing unexpected challenges as she is assigned to Quarry Hill, one of the city's most notorious slums"
