= Bryden Murdoch =

Scottish actor (1925–1978)

Bryden Murdoch (c.1925 – 1978) was a Scottish stage and television actor.

Murdoch was active from the 1950s to the 1970s. He was a member of Edinburgh's Gateway Theatre Company from 1955 to 1965. He had roles in the television series Rob Roy, The New Road, Sutherland's Law, Dr. Finlay's Casebook, The Borderers and The View from Daniel Pike. He provided voice over commentary for the documentary film The Construction of the Forth Road Bridge, and Scotland's first Oscar winner Seawards the Great Ships (1960).

Murdoch died in Edinburgh in 1978 at the age of 53.

== Theatre ==
Year	Title	Role	Director	Company	Notes
1955-56	Beneath the Wee Red Lums		James Gibson	Gateway Theatre Company	play by T.M. Watson
1965	The Man from Thermopylae	Philander	Richard Mathews	Gateway Theatre Company	play by Ada F. Kay

== Television ==
Year	Title	Role	Director	Production	Notes
1959	The Other Dear Charmer	Robert Ainslie	Pharic Maclaren	BBC Scotland	play by Robert Kemp
1961	Rob Roy	Andrew Fairservice	Kevin Sheldon	BBC Scotland	E.J. Bell's dramatisation of the novel by Walter Scott
1969	The Borderers	James Stewart, Earl of Moray	Moira Armstrong	BBC	drama series written by Bill Craig
