= Such Is Life (1930 film) =

1930 film

- Directed by: Carl Junghans
- Screenplay by: Carl Junghans
- Produced by: Carl Junghans
- Starring: Vera Baranovskaya; Theodor Pištěk; Máňa Ženíšková
- Cinematography: Laszlo Schäffer
- Edited by: Carl Junghans
- Music by: Zdeněk Liška (1959 version)
- Production company: Starfilm
- Release date: 24 March 1930
- Running time: 75 min
- Country: Czechoslovakia
- Languages: Silent; Czech intertitles
- Budget: 200 000 Kčs

Such Is Life (Czech: Takový je život) is a 1930 Czech drama film directed by Carl Junghans and starring Vera Baranovskaya, Theodor Pištěk and Máňa Ženíšková. The German director Carl Junghans was unable to secure funding in his native country, but eventually found an investor in Theodor Pištěk and the movie was made in Czechoslovakia.

== Plot ==
The movie follows story of a washerwoman, her lazy husband and her daughter.

== Cast ==
- Vera Baranovskaya as Washerwoman
- Theodor Pištěk as Washerwoman's husband
- Máňa Ženíšková as Washerwoman's daughter
- Wolfgang Zilzer as Washerwoman's daughter's boyfriend
- Jindřich Plachta as Seamster
- Manja Kellerová as Seamster's wife
- Eman Fiala as Pianist
- Valeska Gert as Waitress
- Uli Tridenskaya as Washerwoman's friend
- Betty Kysilková as Teller
- Edith Ledererová as Seamster's daughter
- Max Körner as Coal company owner

== Reception ==
The film was well received by critics and audience, however being a silent film in 1930 it couldn't compete with sound films and quickly disappeared from theatres.

== Restoration ==
For many years the film was considered lost until 1959 when the film was discovered, reconstructed by director Elmar Klos, and new music was created by Zdeněk Liška. In 2016 the film was digitally restored by Czech Film Archive. The restored version was first shown at Il Cinema Ritrovato festival in Bologna on 29 June 2016.
