= Empire Christmas pudding =

Steamed pudding

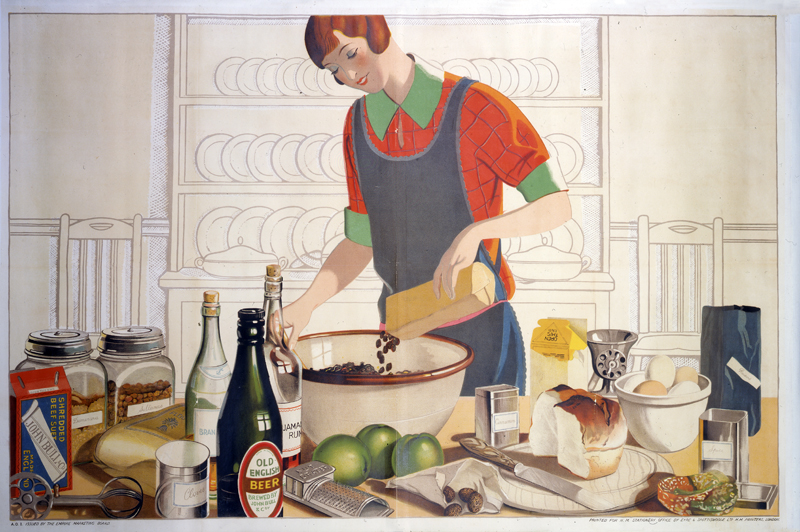
Making the Empire Christmas Pudding by F. C. Harrison

The empire Christmas pudding is a holiday plum pudding developed in the 1920s from a recipe from the British royal family's kitchen, calling for ingredients from countries of the British Empire, which was intended to encourage nationalistic pride.

== History ==
Plum pudding, which originally referred to any pudding using dark-colored dried fruits, developed from frumenty. When sugar became inexpensive enough that even poor households could afford it, the dish became distinctly sweet and evolved into a dense fruited breadlike or cakelike porridge that was prepared by steaming; the generic name for such a dish was plum pudding.

Plum pudding became an important symbol of and traditional to the celebration of Christmas in the Victorian era, partially because of the popularity of Charles Dickens' A Christmas Carol, which featured the dish in an important scene in which it "came to symbolise irrepressible cheer in the face of hardship", according to the BBC. According to historian Lizzie Collingham, this was part of "the invention of Christmas [as a] cosy celebration of Englishness" along with the Christmas tree and Christmas cards and included a "stirring up" of the pudding by every member of a household as a ritual that ensured good fortune in the coming year.

In 1922, the British Women's Patriotic League campagned for an "Empire shopping week", including urging home cooks to "make your Christmas pudding an 'Empire Pudding'" by using ingredients sourced from empire nations. In 1926 the Empire Marketing Board promoted the Christmas pudding as a way to financially support fellow empire nations. The idea of an Empire pudding gained public interest, and George V ordered the entire royal Christmas dinner of 1926 should be created only from ingredients sourced from empire nations.

The first recipe "[annoyed] Wales, Scotland and Ireland" and Cyprus because no ingredients were called for from those countries. Later recipes were similarly criticized; according to the BBC, for the second iteration, "Canada complained that its listed contribution was just five ounces of minced apple; Cyprus grumbled that it now shared brandy responsibilities with Australia, historical Palestine and South Africa; and poor New Zealand was forgotten completely".

In 1931, an annual Christmas market for the People's Dispensary for Sick Animals was held at the Royal Albert Hall on 24 and 25 November. A 10-ton Christmas pudding, the largest ever created up until that time, was featured. The recipe became known as the "Prince of Wales' Empire Christmas Pudding". The Times newspaper noted "The Lord Mayor of London has promised to give the pudding its first 'stir'. He will be followed by the High Commissioners of the Dominions, and afterwards the general public will have the chance of stirring it". The Prince of Wales (later Edward VIII) was then a patron of the PDSA charity. The pudding was then divided up into 11,208 smaller puddings, which were distributed throughout the country.

== Popularity and importance ==
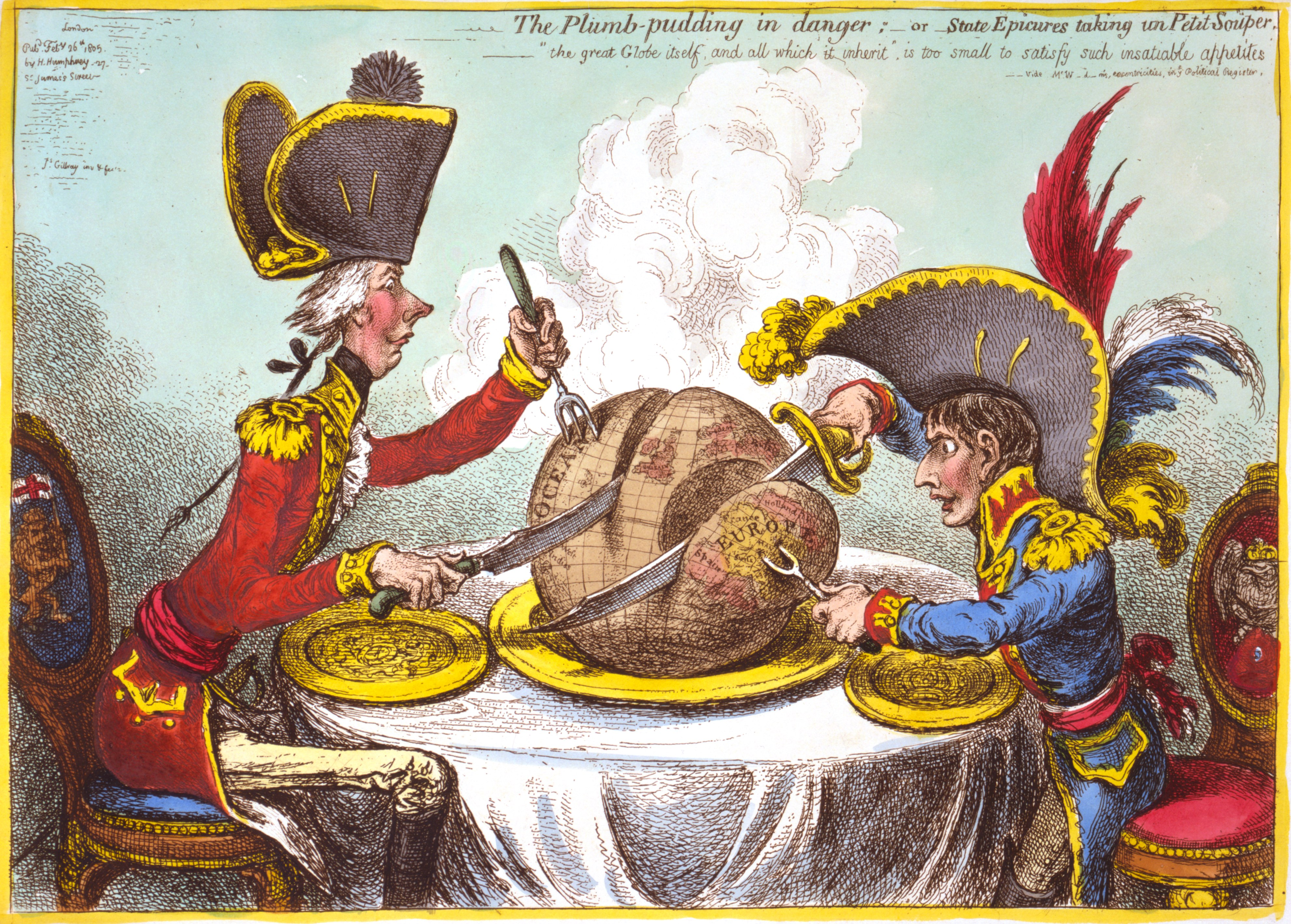
The Plumb-pudding in Danger by James Gillray, showing William Pitt and Napoleon Bonaparte splitting up the British empire, represented by a plum pudding

The plum pudding itself became a symbol of the British empire.

According to social anthropologist Kaori O'Connor, the pudding was "in its time the most famous pudding in the world". According to the BBC, the dish's "cultural and political clout have extended far beyond the dining table" which in the early 20th century was "a potent propaganda tool and a boastful symbol of British imperialism" with a message that "just look at the wonders we can achieve when we all pull together".

The pudding "symbolized empire and the unity of the empire" by calling for ingredients from throughout the British empire, including Jamaican rum, candied orange peel from South Africa, spices from India and Zanzibar, and Australian currants, and that was baked and ceremoniously presented to the king of England as a part of Christmas dinner. According to Collingham, "The plum pudding was thought of as 'a truly national dish' not in spite of but because of its foreign ingredients… To be a Victorian Englishman was to possess the power to eat the world."

== Development ==
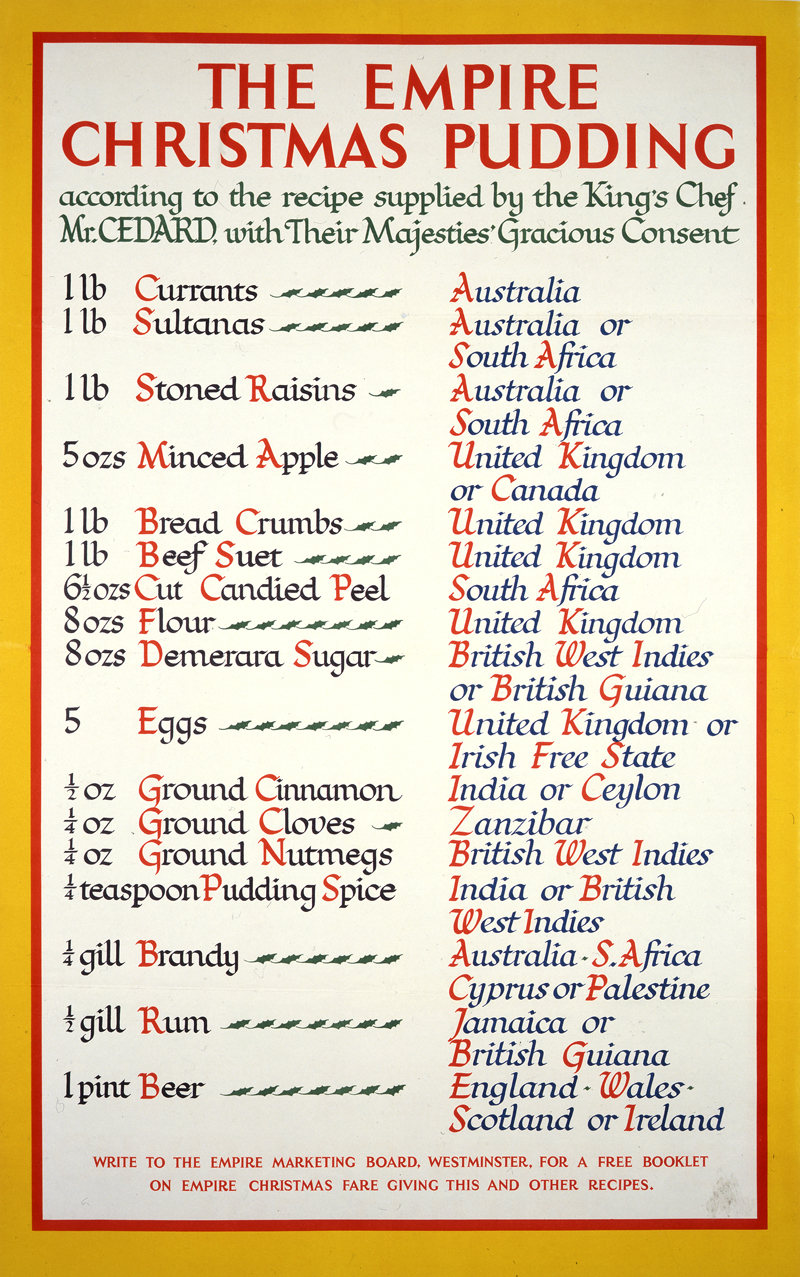
Recipe for the empire Christimas pudding

In 1927, the Empire Marketing Board (EMB) wrote a letter to the Master of the Royal Household, requesting a copy of the recipe used to make the Christmas pudding for the royal family. The King and Queen granted Leo Amery, the head of the EMB, permission to use the recipe in a publication in the following November. The royal chef, Henry Cédard, provided it. In order to distribute the recipe, the EMB had to overcome two challenges: size and ingredients. First, the original recipe was measured to serve 40 people, including the entire royal family and their guests. The EMB was challenged to rework the recipe to serve only 8 people. Second, the ingredients used to make the pudding had to be changed to reflect the ideals of the Empire. The origins of each ingredient were carefully manipulated to represent some of the Empire's many colonies. The recipe was distributed through newspapers and magazines throughout the British empire, and the dish was presented as a "symbol of empire and the unity of the empire"; the intention was for people all over the empire to eat this pudding at Christmas and experience a feeling of interconnection.
