= Valeska Gert =

German dancer (1892–1978)

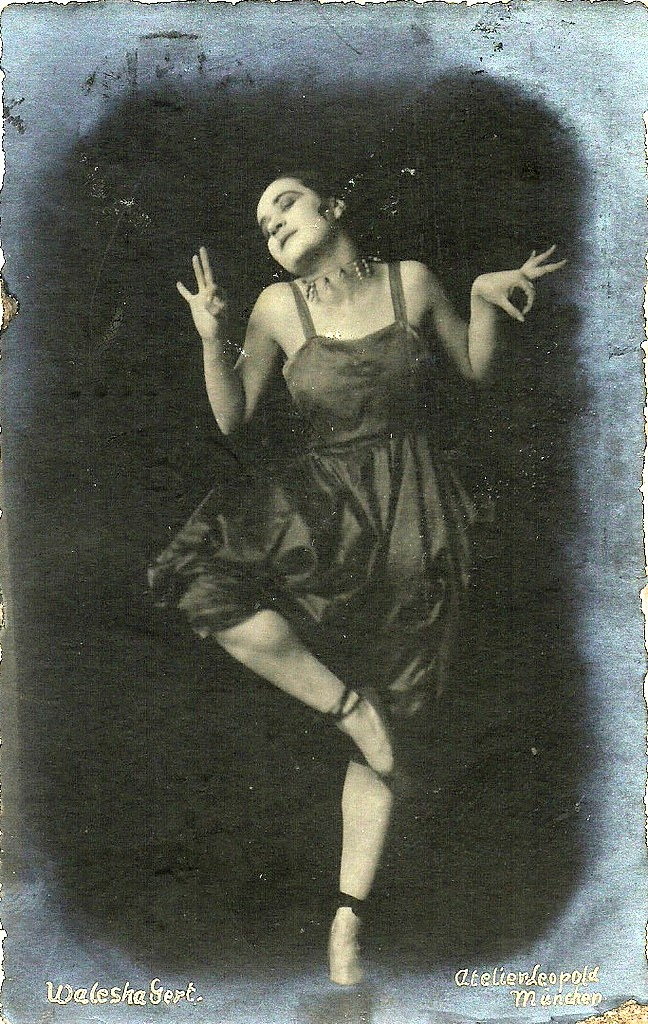
Valeska Gert, Munich, 1918

Valeska Gert (11 January 1892 – c. 16 March 1978) was a German dancer, pantomime, cabaret artist, actress and pioneering performance artist.

== Early life and career ==
Gert was born as Gertrud Valesca Samosch in Berlin to a Jewish family. She was the eldest daughter of manufacturer Theodor Samosch and Augusta Rosenthal. Exhibiting no interest in academics or office work, she began taking dance lessons at the age of nine. This, combined with her love of ornate fashion, led her to a career in dance and performance art. In 1915, she studied acting with Maria Moissi, and dance with Rita Sacchetto.

World War I had a negative effect on her father's finances, forcing her to rely on herself far more than other bourgeois daughters typically might. As World War I raged, Gert joined a Berliner dance group and created revolutionary satirical dance. She created her first solo dance, Dance in Orange, beginning of 1916 and performed it - as part of a programme by her dance teacher Rita Sacchetto - at Blüthnersaal in Berlin, and the following week at UFA movie palace at Nollendorfplatz in Berlin, in the break between two films.

Following engagements at the Deutsches Theater and the Tribüne in Berlin, Gert was invited to perform in expressionist plays in Dadaist mixed media art nights. Her performances in Oskar Kokoschka's Hiob (1918), Ernst Toller's Transformation (1919), and Frank Wedekind's Franziska earned her popularity.

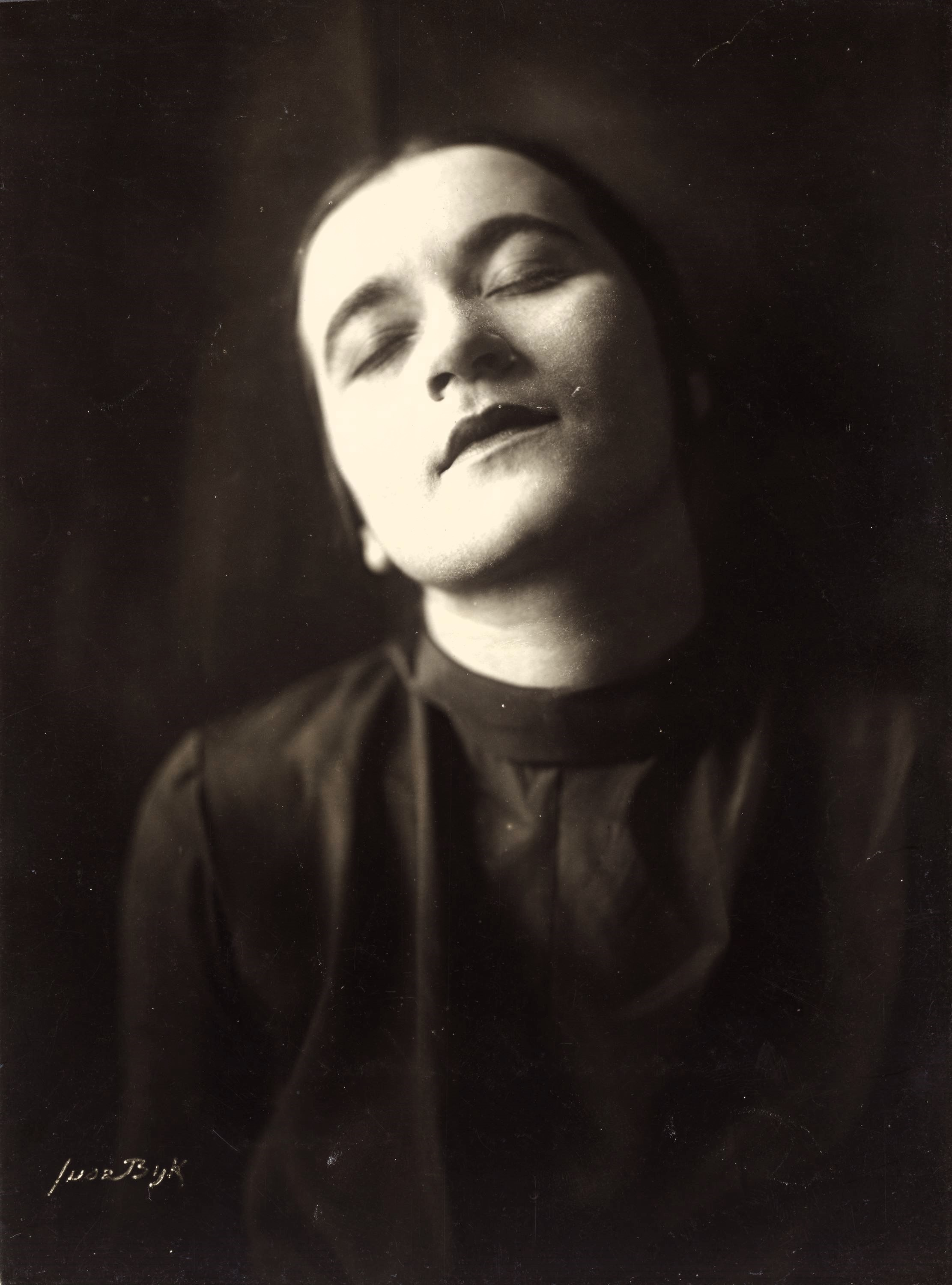
Valeska Gert photograph by Suse Byk

In the 1920s, Gert premiered one of her more provocative works, titled Canaille (meaning a prostitute). Also in the 1920s, Gert's other progressive performances included dancing a traffic accident, boxing, or dying. She was revolutionary and radical and never ceased to simultaneously shock and fascinate her audiences. When she danced Canaille with an orgasm in Berlin in 1922, the audience called the police.

During this time, she performed in the Schall und Rauch cabaret. Gert also launched a tour of her own dances, including titles like Dance in Orange, Boxing, Circus, Japanese Grotesque, Death, and Canaille. In addition, she contributed articles for magazines like Die Weltbühne (The World Stage) and the Berliner Tageszeitung (Berline Daily News).

By 1923, Gert focused her work partially on film acting, performing with Andrews Engelmann, Arnold Korff, and others. She performed in G.W. Pabst's Joyless Street in 1925, Diary of a Lost Girl in 1929, and The Threepenny Opera in 1931. Also in 1923, she met her love, Aribert Wäscher. Their relationship lasted until 1938. From 1926 at the latest, on the stage she introduced new solo pieces she called Tontänze (Sound Dances), adding her voice - noises and words - to her movements, gestures and facial expressions.

Gert could be by turns grotesque, intense, mocking, pathetic or furious, performing with an anarchic intensity and artistic fearlessness which also recommended her to the Dadaists. Valeska Gert analysed the limits of societal conventions and then expressed with her body the insights that she gained from her analyses.

== Exile ==
=== London ===
In 1933, Gert's Jewish heritage resulted in her being banned from the German stage. Her exile from Germany sent her to London for some time, where she worked both in theatre and film. In London, she worked on the experimental short film Pett and Pott, which long stood as her last movie. While in London, she wed an English writer, Robin Hay Anderson, her second marriage.

=== United States ===
Beginning of 1939, she emigrated to the United States, where she was cared for by a Jewish refugee community. This same year, she hired the 17-year-old Georg Kreisler as a rehearsal pianist to continue focus on cabaret work. In summer 1940, she found work posing as a nude model for an artist in Provincetown (Massachusetts). By the end of 1941, she had opened the Beggar's Bar in New York City. It was a cabaret/restaurant that was filled with mismatched furniture and lamps. Julian Beck, Judith Malina, and Jackson Pollock worked for her. Tennessee Williams also worked for her for a short time as a busboy, but was fired for refusing to pool his tips. Gert commented that his work was "so sloppy". In February 1945, Gert had to close her Beggar's Bar despite its success, due to a lack of official permits.

Gert spent every summer in Provincetown until 1946, when she opened her new cabaret Valeska's there. In Provincetown, she reunited with Tennessee Williams. She told him stories of hiring a 70-year-old midget named Mademoiselle Pumpernickel for the Beggar's Bar who became jealous whenever Gert went onstage. During the summer 1946, while she ran Valeska's, she was called to Provincetown court for throwing garbage out of her window and failing to pay a dance partner. She called upon Williams as a character witness, which he did with pleasure, despite her having fired him. He told incredulous friends that he "simply liked her".

=== Return to Europe ===
In 1947 she returned to Europe. After stays in Paris and Zurich, where she ran a cabaret café called Valeska und ihr Küchenpersonal (Valeska and her kitchen staff) for half a year in 1948, she went back to Blockaded Berlin. There she first opened the cabaret Bei Valeska in the former Opernkeller (Opera cellar) at the Theater des Westens in 1949–1950, after that the cabaret Hexenküche (Witch's Kitchen) in 1950. It was active every winter until April 1956. During the same period, she opened her cabaret Ziegenstall (Goat Shed) in the village of Kampen on the island of Sylt in summer 1951. She ran this small but well known cabaret each summer until her death. In the 1960s, she made her comeback in film. In 1965, she had a role in Fellini's Juliet of the Spirits, the success of which caused her to market herself to young German directors in the 1970s. During this period, she played in Rainer Werner Fassbinder's TV series Eight Hours Don't Make a Day and in Volker Schlöndorff's 1976 movie Coup de Grâce.

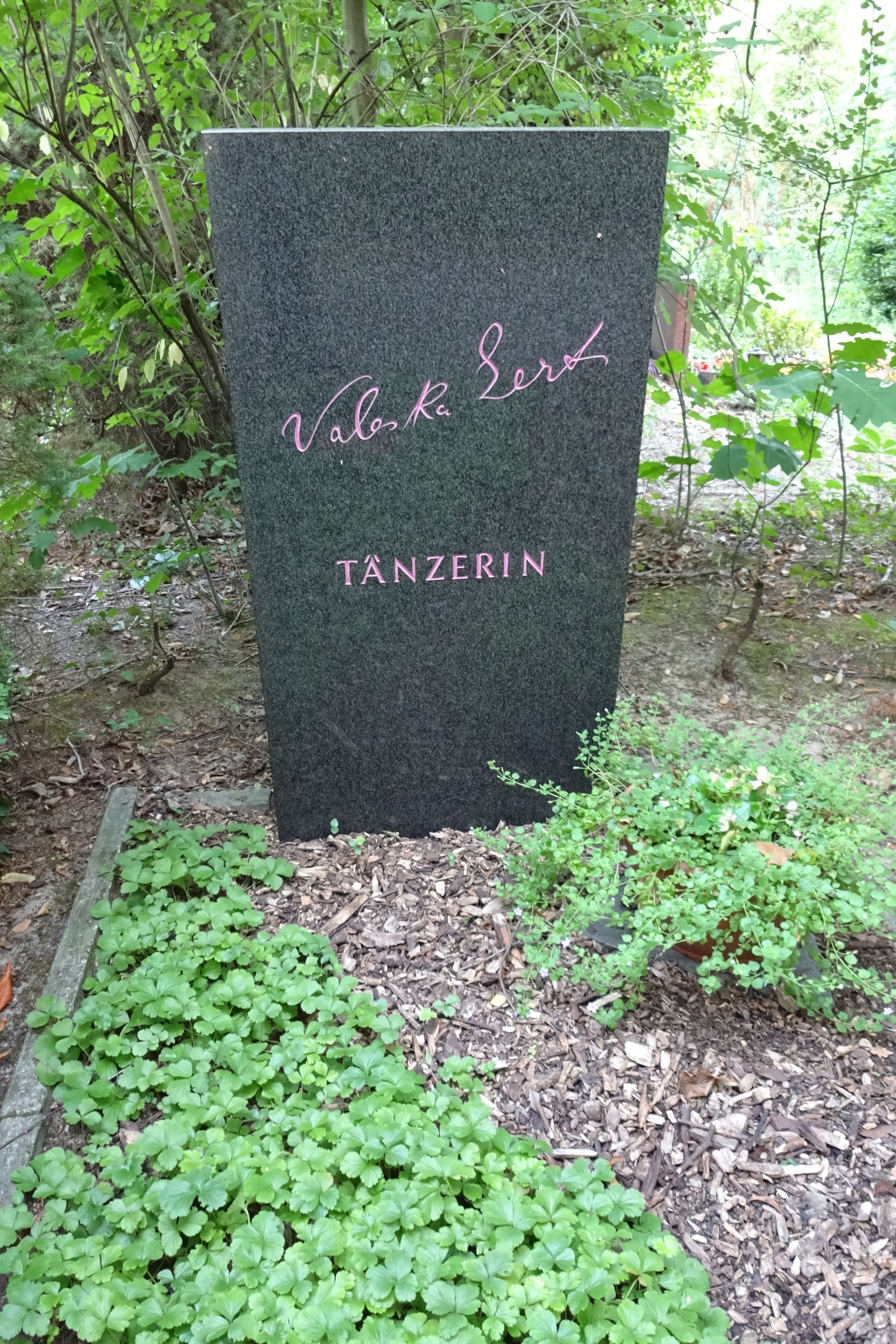
Grave of Honour by the city of Berlin

In 1978, Werner Herzog invited her to play the real estate broker Knock in his remake of Murnau's classic film Nosferatu. The contract was signed March 1 but she died just two weeks later before filming began. On 18 March 1978 neighbors and friends in Kampen, Germany, reported she had not been seen for four days. When her door was forced in the presence of police she was found dead. She is believed to have died on 16 March. She was 86 years old. In 2010, the art of Valeska Gert was presented at the Berlin Museum for Contemporary Art Hamburger Bahnhof, in the exhibition Pause. Bewegte Fragmente (Pause. Fragments in motion). The curators Wolfgang Müller from the art punk band Die Tödliche Doris (The Deadly Doris) and art historian An Paenhuysen included a video Baby showing Gert performing. It was recorded by Ernst Mitzka in 1969. Mitzka's video of Gert performing Baby and Death is also included in the video art collection Record Again! 40 Jahre Videokunst.de part 2.

== Filmography ==
=== Silent ===
- 1918: Colomba (Germany, director: Arzén von Cserépy)
- 1925: Wood Love (Germany, director: Hans Neumann) - Puck
- 1925: Joyless Street (Germany, director: Georg Wilhelm Pabst) - Frau Greifer (uncredited)
- 1926: Nana (Germany / France, director: Jean Renoir after Émile Zola) - Zoe - la femme de chambre
- 1928: Alraune (Germany, director: Henrik Galeen, after Hanns Heinz Ewers) - Ein Mädchen von der Gasse
- 1929: Der Tod (Experimental film) (Germany, director: Carl Koch ("Totentanz", part of Brecht's The Baden-Baden Lesson on Consent)
- 1929: Diary of a Lost Girl (Germany, director: Georg Wilhelm Pabst, nach Margarete Böhme) - The director's wife
- 1930: Such Is Life (Takový je život) (Germany / Czechoslovakia, director: Carl Junghans) - Waitress
- 1930: People on Sunday (Germany, director: Robert Siodmak, Rochus Gliese, Edgar G. Ulmer) - Herself

=== Sound films ===
- 1931: The Threepenny Opera (Germany, director: Georg Wilhelm Pabst) - Mrs. Peachum
- 1934: Pett and Pott (Short, United Kingdom, director: Alberto Cavalcanti) - The Maid
- 1939: Rio (United Kingdom, director: John Brahm) - Specialty (uncredited)
- 1965: Giulietta degli spiriti (Italy / France / West Germany, director: Federico Fellini) - Pijma
- 1966: La Bonne dame (France, Director: Pierre Philippe)
- 1973: Eight Hours Don't Make a Day (TV Series, Episode: "Franz und Ernst", West Germany, director: Rainer Werner Fassbinder) - Die andere Oma
- 1975: Die Betörung der blauen Matrosen (West Germany, director: Ulrike Ottinger) - Ein alter Vogel
- 1976: Coup de Grâce (West Germany / France, director: Volker Schlöndorff) - Tante Praskovia (final film role)
- 1977: Nur zum Spaß, nur zum Spiel – Kaleidoskop Valeska Gert (Documentary, West Germany, director: Volker Schlöndorff)

== Awards ==
- 1970: Filmband in Gold for lifelong achievement in German film
- 2004: Honoured with a star on the Walk of Fame of Cabaret in Mainz

== Bibliography ==
Primary sources, Monographs by Valeska Gert

- Valeska Gert: Mein Weg. Leipzig 1931. (2nd ed., self-published, s.l. & s.a., ca. 1950)
- Valeska Gert: Die Bettlerbar von New York. Berlin 1950. (2nd ed., s.l. & s.a., ca. 1958)
- Valeska Gert: Ich bin eine Hexe. Munich 1968 (various editions)
- Valeska Gert: Die Katze von Kampen. Percha 1974
- Valeska Gert: Je suis une sorcière. Kaléidoscope d'une vie dansée. Paris 2004 (Translation of Ich bin eine Hexe, annotated and a foreword by Philippe Ivernel)
- About 20 essays by Valeska Gert are mentioned in F.-M. Peter (1985)

Secondary literature, Monographs about Valeska Gert

- Fred Hildenbrandt: Die Tänzerin Valeska Gert. Stuttgart 1928
- Frank-Manuel Peter: Valeska Gert: Tänzerin, Schauspielerin und Kabarettistin. Eine dokumentarische Biographie. Berlin 1985, 2nd ed. 1987
- Susanne Foellmer: Valeska Gert. Fragmente einer Avantgardistin in Tanz und Schauspiel der 1920er Jahre. Bielefeld 2006. With CD-ROM (Dance films by Gert, Mary Wigman and Niddy Impekoven)
- Solo für ein Mannequin von Grieneisen, Homage to Valeska Gert, audi collage by Peter Eckhart Reichel with Monika Hansen and Gerd Wameling, duo-phon records, 2001
- Wolfgang Müller Valeska Gert. Ästhetik der Präsenzen, written by the founder of the West-Berlin performance group Die Tödliche Doris about the relations between the performances/art of the Proto-Punk Valeska Gert to the Post-Punk scene, Berlin 2010.

Secondary literature, Monographs mentioning Valeska Gert

Valeska Gert's bold new style of dance was recognized early by her contemporaries. Here is a selection of books:

- Paul Nikolaus: Tänzerinnen. Munich (1919)
- Ernst Blass: Das Wesen der neuen Tanzkunst. Weimar 1921.
- Werner Suhr: Das Gesicht des Tanzes. Egestorf near Hamburg 1927

Academic treatment

- Gabriele Brandstetter: Tanz-Lektüren. Körperbilder und Raumfiguren der Avantgarde. Frankfurt a. M. 1995
- Dianne S. Howe: Individuality and Expression – The Aesthetics of the New German Dance, 1908–1936. New York 1996
- Ramsay Burt: Alien bodies: representations of modernity, ‚race' and nation in early modern dance. New York 1998
- Christiane Kuhlmann: Bewegter Körper – Mechanischer Apparat. Zur medialen Verschränkung von Tanz und Fotografie in den 1920er Jahren. Frankfurt a. M. 2003
- Yvonne Hardt: Politische Körper. Ausdruckstanz, Choreografien des Protests und die Arbeiterkulturbewegung in der Weimarer Republik. Münster 2004
- Amelie Soyka: "Lauter zischende kleine Raketen: Valeska Gert". In: Dies. (ed.): Tanzen, tanzen und nichts als tanzen. Tänzerinnen der Moderne von Josephine Baker bis Mary Wigman. Berlin 2004, p. 123–137
- Alexandra Kolb: "So watt war noch nie da!!!" Valeska Gert's Performances in the Context of Weimar Culture, The European Legacy 2007 (12/3), pp. 293–309
- Kate Elswit: "Back Again? Valeska Gert's Exiles". In: New German Dance Studies. Illinois 2012, p. 113-129
- Kristen Hylenski: "'Ich will leben, auch wenn ich tot bin': Valeska Gert's Autobiographical Legacy." German Life and Letters 66.1 (2013): 39-54.
- Kristen Hylenski: "'Kaleidoskop meines Lebens': Valeska Gert's Performances of the Self." Colloquia Germanica 42.4 (2009): 289-306.

Secondäry literature, in Biographies

- Hans-Juergen Fink & Michael Seufert: Georg Kreisler gibt es gar nicht – Die Biographie. Frankfurt am Main 2005, p. 96–97
