= Housing Problems =

- Produced by: Arthur Elton; Edgar Anstey
- Cinematography: John Taylor
- Production company: Realist Film Unit
- Release date: 1935
- Running time: 14 minutes
- Country: United Kingdom
- Language: English

Housing Problems is a 1935 British documentary film produced by the Realist Film Unit for the British Commercial Gas Association. The fourteen-minute film documents the poor living conditions experienced by slum housing tenants in the East London district of Stepney, combining narration with interviews of tenants. It emphasises the role of the British Commercial Gas Association in providing social housing, interviewing residents of new housing projects about their improved conditions as well as displaying architectural models of housing estates planned by local authorities.

Housing Problems does not have a credited director; however, production is credited to Arthur Elton and Edgar Anstey, and "photography" is credited to John Taylor. Ruby Grierson also worked as an uncredited assistant on the film, her first role in documentary filmmaking.

It was one of the first documentaries that centred the voices of its subjects through the use of interviews. Whether these interviews were scripted remains a matter of debate.

One of the housing models depicted is of the planned Quarry Hill Estate in Leeds. The film showcases the estate's innovative steel-frame architecture and open spaces, with amenities including a shopping centre and a welfare centre. In actuality, the Quarry Hill Estate was never fully completed; many of the intended amenities were never built, and it was completely demolished in 1978.
