= Sir Arthur Elton, 10th Baronet =

Sir Arthur Elton Bt
- Born: Arthur Hallam Rice Elton; 10 February 1906; London, United Kingdom of Great Britain and Ireland
- Died: 1 January 1973 (aged 66); Bristol, United Kingdom
- Education: Jesus College, University of Cambridge, 1927
- Occupations: Film producer; film director; Executive producer
- Spouse(s): Margaret Ann Björnson, Lady Elton
- Children: 3, including Sir Charles Elton, 11th Baronet
- Parents: Sir Ambrose Elton, 9th Baronet (father); Dorothy Wynne Wiggin, Lady Elton (mother)
- Family: Elton Baronetcy

Elton, Sir Arthur Hallam Rice, 10th Baronet (1906–1973) was a British film producer, director, executive and prominent figure in the British Documentary Film Movement.

== Early life and education ==
Arthur Hallam Rice Elton was born on 10 February 1906 in London, to Dorothy Wynne Wiggin, Lady Elton (1882–1957) and Sir Ambrose Elton, 9th Baronet (1869–1951), a barrister.

Elton was educated at Marlborough College. In 1927, Elton graduated from Jesus College.

== Career ==
After graduation, he worked as a scriptwriter in England and Germany, and in 1931 was recruited into the Empire Marketing Board Film Unit (later the GPO Film Unit) by John Grierson. He worked as a director and producer on many films over the next two decades, mainly for the government, though 1932's Voice of the World was sponsored by His Master's Voice, the first example of industrial sponsorship of a documentary film. During the Second World War he became supervisor of films at the Ministry of Information, and afterwards he became an advisor to the Shell Petroleum Company and production head of Shell Films.

== Personal life ==
In 1948, Elton married Margaret Ann Björnson, Lady Elton (1915–1995), an Icelandic-Canadian film producer and historian. Together the couple had three children.

Following his father's death in 1951, Elton inherited the Elton Baronetcy title and Clevedon Court. Elton restored the building and donated it to the National Trust in lieu of death duties. He took a keen interest in the town of Clevedon, becoming chairman of the printing company which produced the local paper. He was also prominent in the campaign to restore Clevedon Pier.

Upon Elton's death, his collection of material relating to British industrial development (valued at over a quarter of a million pounds) was given to the Ironbridge Museum. He was succeeded by his son Elton, Sir Charles Abraham Grierson, 11th Baronet (1953–).

== Filmography ==
Year	Title	Role	Notes	Ref(s)
1931	Shadow on the Mountain	Director	Released in two versions Shadow on the Mountains (1931) and Experiment in the Welsh Hills (1932)	
1931	Salmon Leap	Director		
1932	Upstream	Director		
1931	Industrial Britain	Co-cinematographer	With Basil Wright	
1932	An Experiment on the Welsh Hills	Director		
1932	The Voice of the World	Director		
1934	John Atkins Saves Up	Director		
1934	Aero Engine	Director		
1935	Housing Problems	Co-producer	With Edgar Anstey. No credited director	
1935	Workers and Jobs	Director	Sponsored by the Ministry Of Labour	
1936	A Party Dish by X. Marcel Boulestin	Director		
1936	A Scratch Meal with Marcel Boulestin	Director		
1973	Grierson	Self	Documentary about John Grierson, directed by Roger Blais	

== See also ==
- Edgar Anstey
- Alberto Cavalcanti
- John Grierson
- Humphrey Jennings
- Paul Rotha
- Basil Wright

Baronetage of Great Britain
Preceded by Ambrose Elton	Baronet (of Bristol); 1951–1973	Succeeded by Charles Elton
