= John Grierson =

Scottish documentary filmmaker (1898–1972)

John Grierson CBE
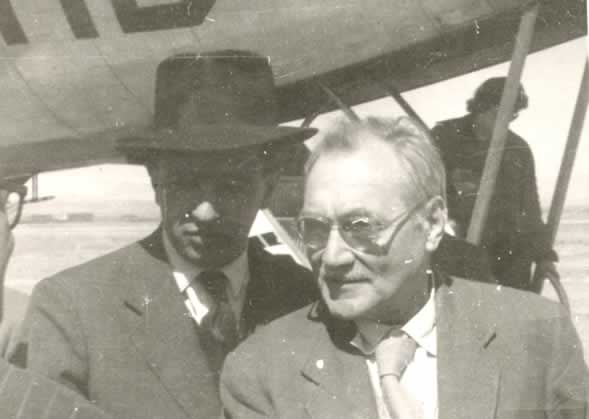
- Grierson (right) with Bolivian filmmaker Jorge Ruiz in 1955
- Born: 26 April 1898; Deanston, Perthshire, Scotland
- Died: 19 February 1972 (aged 73); Bath, Somerset, England
- Occupations: Filmmaker, film critic, film theorist

1st Government Film Commissioner and Chairperson of the National Film Board of Canada
- In office 1939–1945
- Prime Minister: William Lyon Mackenzie King
- Preceded by: Position established
- Succeeded by: Ross McLean

John Grierson (26 April 1898 – 19 February 1972) was a Scottish filmmaker, film theorist, and critic, often considered the father of British and Canadian documentary film. In 1926, Grierson coined the term "documentary" in a review of Robert J. Flaherty's Moana. In 1939, Grierson established the all-time Canadian film institutional production and distribution company The National Film Board of Canada controlled by the Government of Canada.

== Early life and education ==
Grierson was born in the old schoolhouse in Deanston, near Doune, Scotland, to schoolmaster Robert Morrison Grierson from Boddam, near Peterhead, and Jane Anthony, a teacher from Ayrshire. His mother, a suffragette and ardent Labour Party activist, often took the chair at Tom Johnston's election meetings.

The family moved to Cambusbarron, Stirling, in 1900, when the children were still young, after Grierson's father was appointed headmaster of Cambusbarron school. When the family moved, John had three elder sisters, Agnes, Janet, and Margaret, and a younger brother, Anthony. John and Anthony were enrolled at Cambusbarron school in November 1903. His sister Margaret died in 1906; however, the family continued to grow as John gained three younger sisters, Dorothy, Ruby, and finally Marion in 1907.

Both parents steeped their son in liberal politics, humanistic ideals, and Calvinist moral and religious philosophies, particularly that education was essential to individual freedom and that hard and meaningful work was the way to prove oneself worthy in the sight of God. John was enrolled in the High School at Stirling in September 1908, and he played football and rugby for the school.

=== World War I ===
In July 1915, Grierson left school with an overall subject mark of 82%; John had sat the bursary examination at Gilmorehill the month before, as his parents wanted him to follow his elder sisters, Janet and Agnes, in going to the University of Glasgow. The results for the bursary examination were not posted until October 1915; Grierson applied to work at the munitions at Alexandria; the munitions building had been the original home of the Argyll Motor Company which had earlier in the twentieth century built the first complete motor car in Scotland.

Grierson was the second name on the bursary list and received the John Clark bursary, which was tenable for four years. Grierson entered the University of Glasgow in 1916; however, he was unhappy that his efforts to help in World War I were only through his work at the munitions. Grierson wanted to join the navy; his family on his father's side had long been lighthouse keepers, and John had many memories of visiting lighthouses and being beside the sea. He went to the Crystal Palace in London to train with the Royal Naval Volunteer Reserve. In his recruitment letter he had added a year to his age so that he could attend.

On 7 January 1916, Grierson was sent to the wireless telegraphy station at Aultbea, Cromarty, as an ordinary telegraphist but was promoted to telegraphist on 2 June 1916. On 23 January 1917, he became a telegraphist on the minesweeper H.M.S Surf and served there until 13 October 1917. The next day he joined H.M.S Rightwhale, where he was promoted to leading telegraphist on 2 June 1918 and remained on the vessel until he was demobilised with a British War Medal and the Victory Medal.

=== University of Glasgow ===
Grierson returned to university in 1919; he joined the Fabian Society in 1919 and dissolved it in 1921. The New University Labour Club was initiated by John as well as the Critic's Club; he also had poetry published in the Glasgow University magazine from November 1920 until February 1923. Grierson received the Buchan Prize in the Ordinary Class of English Language in the academic year of 1919–20, he also received the prize and first-class certificate in the academic year of 1920–21 in the Ordinary Class of Moral Philosophy and graduated with a Master of Arts in English and moral philosophy in 1923.

In 1923, Grierson received a Rockefeller Research Fellowship to study in the United States at the University of Chicago, and later at Columbia and the University of Wisconsin–Madison. His research focus was the psychology of propaganda—the impact of the press, film, and other mass media on forming public opinion. Grierson was particularly interested in the popular appeal and influence of the "yellow" (tabloid) press, and the influence and role of these journals on the education of new American citizens from abroad.

== Social critic ==
In his review of Robert Flaherty's film Moana (1926) in the New York Sun (8 February 1926), Grierson wrote that it had 'documentary' value. In his essay "First Principles of Documentary" (1932), Grierson argued that the principles of documentary were that cinema's potential for observing life could be exploited in a new art form; that the "original" actor and "original" scene are better guides than their fiction counterparts to interpreting the modern world; and that materials "thus taken from the raw" can be more real than the acted article. In this regard, Grierson's views align with the Soviet filmmaker Dziga Vertov's contempt for dramatic fiction as "bourgeois excess", though with considerably more subtlety. Grierson's definition of documentary as "creative treatment of actuality" has gained some acceptance, though it presents philosophical questions about documentaries containing stagings and reenactments.

Like many social critics of the time, Grierson was profoundly concerned about what he perceived to be clear threats to democracy. In the US, he encountered a marked tendency toward political reaction, anti-democratic sentiments, and political apathy. He read and agreed with the journalist and political philosopher Walter Lippmann's book Public Opinion which blamed the erosion of democracy in part on the fact that the political and social complexities of contemporary society made it difficult if not impossible for the public to comprehend and respond to issues vital to the maintenance of democratic society.

In Grierson's view, a way to counter these problems was to involve citizens in their government with the kind of engaging excitement generated by the popular press, which simplified and dramatized public affairs. It was during this time that Grierson developed a conviction that motion pictures could play a central role in promoting this process. (It has been suggested film scholar Paul Swann that some of Grierson's notions regarding the social and political uses of film were influenced by reading Lenin's writing about film as education and propaganda.)

Grierson's emerging view of film was as a form of social and political communication—a mechanism for social reform, education, and perhaps spiritual uplift. His view of Hollywood movie-making was considerably less sanguine:

"In an age when the faiths, the loyalties, and the purposes have been more than usually undermined, mental fatigue--or is it spiritual fatigue?--represents a large factor in everyday experience. Our cinema magnate does no more than exploit the occasion. He also, more or less frankly, is a dope pedlar."

== Film critic ==
Grierson's emerging and outspoken film philosophies caught the attention of New York film critics at the time. He was asked to write criticism for the New York Sun. At the Sun, Grierson wrote articles on film aesthetics and audience reception, and developed broad contacts in the film world. According to popular myth, in the course of this writing stint, Grierson coined the term "documentary" in writing about Robert J. Flaherty's film Moana (1926): "Of course Moana, being a visual account of events in the daily life of a Polynesian youth and his family, has documentary value."

During this time, Grierson was also involved in scrutinizing the film industries of other countries. He may have been involved in arranging to bring Sergei Eisenstein's groundbreaking film The Battleship Potemkin (1925) to US audiences for the first time. Eisenstein's editing techniques and film theories, particularly the use of montage, would have a significant influence on Grierson's own work.

== Filmmaker ==
Grierson returned to Great Britain in 1927 armed with the sense that film could be enlisted to build national morale and consensus, and to deal with social problems, a theory he would enact especially during the Great Depression. Filmmaking for Grierson was an exalted, patriotic calling. Grierson's thinking was elitist in some ways, which he exposed with his many dicta of the time, such as "The elect have their duty" and "I look on cinema as a pulpit, and use it as a propagandist."

Grierson was also a cultural relativist. In the US, he had met pioneering documentary filmmaker Robert Flaherty and respected Flaherty immensely for his contributions to documentary form and his attempts to use the camera to bring alive the lives of everyday people and events. Less commendable in Grierson's view was Flaherty's invalidating focus on exotic and faraway cultures. ("In the profounder kind of way", wrote Grierson of Flaherty, "we live and prosper each of us by denouncing the other"). In Grierson's view, the focus of film should be on the everyday drama of ordinary people. As Grierson wrote in his diaries: "Beware the ends of the earth and the exotic: the drama is on your doorstep wherever the slums are, wherever there is malnutrition, wherever there is exploitation and cruelty." "'You keep your savages in the far place Bob; we are going after the savages of Birmingham,' I think I said to him pretty early on. And we did.")

=== Empire Marketing Board ===
On his return to England, Grierson was employed on a temporary basis as an Assistant Films Officer of the Empire Marketing Board (EMB), a governmental agency which had been established in 1926 to promote British world trade and British unity throughout the empire. One of the major functions of the EMB was publicity, which the Board accomplished through exhibits, posters, and publications and films. It was within the context of this State-funded organisation that the "documentary" as we know it today got its start.

In late 1929 Grierson and his cameraman, Basil Emmott completed his first film, Drifters, which he wrote, produced and directed. The film, which follows the heroic work of North Sea herring fishermen, was a radical departure from anything being made by the British film industry or Hollywood. A large part of its innovation lies in the fierce boldness in bringing the camera to rugged locations such as a small boat in the middle of a gale while leaving relatively less of the action staged. The choice of topic was chosen less from Grierson's curiosity than the fact that he discovered that the Financial Secretary had made the herring industry his hobbyhorse. It premiered in a private film club in London in November 1929 on a double-bill with Eisenstein's -then controversial- film The Battleship Potemkin (which was banned from general release in Britain until 1954) and received high praise from both its sponsors and the press. The film was shown from 9 December 1929, in the Stoll in Kingsway and then was later screened throughout Britain.

After this success, Grierson moved away from film direction into a greater focus on production and administration within the EMB. He became a tireless organizer and recruiter for the EMB, enlisting a stable of energetic young filmmakers into the film unit between 1930 and 1933. Those enlisted included filmmakers Basil Wright, Edgar Anstey, Stuart Legg, Paul Rotha, Arthur Elton, Humphrey Jennings, Harry Watt, and Alberto Cavalcanti. This group formed the core of what was to become known as the British Documentary Film Movement. Robert Flaherty himself also worked briefly for the unit. In 1933 the EMB Film Unit was disbanded, a casualty of Depression-era economics.

=== General Post Office ===
Grierson's boss at the EMB moved to the General Post Office (GPO) as its first public relations officer, with the stipulation that he could bring the EMB film unit with him. Grierson's crew were charged with demonstrating how the Post Office facilitated modern communication and brought the nation together, a task aimed as much at GPO workers as the general public. During Grierson's administration, the GPO Film Unit produced a series of groundbreaking films, including Night Mail (dir. Basil Wright and Harry Watt, 1936) and Coal Face (dir. Alberto Cavalcanti, 1935). In 1934 he produced at the GPO Film Unit the award-winning The Song of Ceylon (dir. Basil Wright) which was sponsored jointly by the Ceylon Tea Propaganda Bureau and the EMB.

In 1934, Grierson sailed on the Isabella Greig out of Granton to film Granton Trawler on Viking Bank which is between Shetland and the Norwegian coast. The footage from his voyage was handed over to Edgar Anstey, who pulled footage of when the camera had fallen over on the deck of the boat to create a storm scene. Granton Trawler was a favourite film of Grierson's, he saw it as a homage to the Isabella Greig that was sunk in 1941 by German bombs when it went out to fish and was never seen again. The Private Life of Gannets was also filmed on the Isabella Greig; the film was shot on Grassholm with Grierson shooting the slow-motion sequence of the gannets diving for fish which took only one afternoon to shoot near Bass Rock in the Firth of Forth. The Private Life of Gannets went on to pick up an Academy Award in 1937.

Grierson eventually grew restless with having to work within the bureaucratic and budgetary confines of government sponsorship. Grierson resigned from the G.P.O. on 30 June 1937, which gave him more time to pursue his passions and the freedom to speak his mind on issues around the world. In response, he sought out private industry sponsorship for film production. He was finally successful in getting the British gas industry to underwrite an annual film program. Perhaps the most significant works produced during this time were Housing Problems (dir. Arthur Elton, Edgar Anstey, John Taylor, and Grierson's sister Ruby Grierson, 1935).

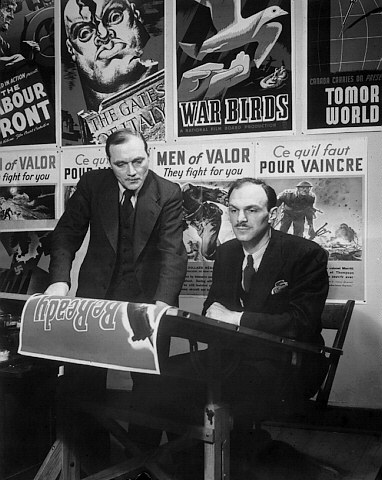
John Grierson (left), Chairman of the Wartime Information Board, meeting with Ralph Foster, Head of Graphics, National Film Board of Canada, to examine a series of posters produced by the National Film Board of Canada

=== Canada ===
In 1938, Grierson was invited by the Canadian government to study the country's film production. Grierson sailed at the end of May in 1938 for Canada and arrived on 17 June. Grierson met with the Prime Minister, William Lyon Mackenzie King and also spoke with many important figures across Canada, they were all in agreement of the importance of film in reducing sectionalism and in promoting the relationship of Canada between home and abroad. The head of the Motion Picture Bureau for Canada, Frank Badgley, did not appreciate Grierson's assessment and criticism of the films made by the Bureau which was that they focused too much on Canada as a place to holiday. Grierson delivered his report on government film propaganda and the weaknesses he had found in Canadian film production; his suggestion was to create a national coordinating body for the production of films. An abridged version of the report ran to 66 pages, which was prepared by August in London. Grierson returned to Britain but was invited back to Canada on 14 October 1938; he returned in November.

==== National Film Board of Canada and Wartime Information Board ====
In 1939, Canada created the National Film Commission, which would later become the National Film Board of Canada. The bill to create a National Film Board was drafted by Grierson; the bill was introduced in March 1939 and given Royal Assent on 2 May 1939. Grierson was appointed the first Commissioner of the National Film Board in October 1939. When Canada entered World War II in 1939, the NFB focused on the production of propaganda films, many of which Grierson directed. For example, captured footage of German war activity was incorporated in documentaries that were distributed to the then-neutral United States.

Grierson grieved the death of his sister Ruby in 1940; she was on the SS City of Benares while it was evacuating one hundred children to Canada. The Benares was torpedoed four days after its sailing, and sank within thirty-one minutes in a Force 10 Gale. Ruby Grierson had managed to enter Lifeboat 8, full with more than thirty people, including eighteen girls and two female escorts, but as it was lowering, a wave crashed into the lifeboat, sending it into a vertical position, and throwing everyone in that boat into the sea. No one from Boat 8 survived. In the end, of 406 people on board, only 148 people survived, including only 19 of 100 children. Grierson resigned from his position in January 1941. Over his year as Commissioner at the National Film Board 40 films were made; the year before the Motion Picture Bureau had made only one and a half. Recommendations for the future running were made for the National Film Board, and Grierson was persuaded to stay for a further six months to oversee the changes.

During WWII, Grierson was a consultant to prime minister William Lyon Mackenzie King as a minister of the Wartime Information Board. He remained on the National Film Board and managed to complete his duties to Wartime Information Board as well through his deputies that aided him in the task. Grierson was asked to keep his dual role until January 1944, however, he resigned in 1943 as the job he had been asked to complete had been finished as far as he was concerned. Before he finished with the Wartime Information Bureau Grierson was also offered the role of chairman of the Canadian Broadcasting Corporation but turned it down as he believed that this would give him too much power.

On 26 February 1942, Grierson attended the Academy Awards and received the award on behalf of the National Film Board for Churchill's Island. Grierson also presented the award for the best documentary, the first time that this award was given by the Academy. After the Dieppe Raid, there were reports that Canadians that had been taken as prisoners of war had been manacled under Hitler's orders. Grierson proposed that the Film Board show how the German prisoners of war were being treated in Canada through a film. Ham Wright directed the film showing the German sailors that had been captured; playing football, enjoying meals and looking healthy. Only one copy of the film was made, it was sent to the Swiss Red Cross who deliberately let it fall into German hands. Grierson was to learn at a later date that Hitler had indeed watched the film and ordered that the Canadian prisoners of war released from their manacles.

After the war, the National Film Board focused on producing documentaries that reflected the lives of Canadians. The National Film Board has become recognized around the world for producing quality films, some of which have won Academy Awards. The National Film Board had become one of the largest film studios and was respected around the world for what it had achieved; it had especially had influence in Czechoslovakia and China.

In December 1943 Grierson was elected by the Permanent Film Committee of the National Council for Canadian-Soviet Friendship to become honorary chairman. One of the tasks at the National Film Board that Grierson strongly pushed for the films being produced to be in French as well as English. He also pushed for a French unit in the National Film Board.

Grierson concentrated on documentary film production in New York after resigning his post following in August 1945; his resignation was to take effect in November 1945. In 1946 Grierson was asked to testify as part of the investigation of the Gouzenko Affair regarding communist spies in the National Film Board and the Wartime Information Board, rumours spread that he had been a leader of a spy ring during his offices with the Canadian government, a rumour he denied. Due to the rumours, the projects that Grierson had been trying to put together were not commissioned and he was barred from taking an important position at the United Nations.

=== Commission on Freedom of the Press ===
Grierson was appointed as a foreign adviser to the Commission on Freedom of the Press in December 1943, which had been set up by the University of Chicago. Grierson was able to make a large contribution to the committee which included Robert M. Hutchins, William E. Hocking, Harold D. Lasswell, Archibald McLeish and Charles Merriam. A Free and Responsible Press was published in 1947.

=== UNESCO ===
Grierson was offered the position of head of information at UNESCO at the end of 1946; he attended the first General Conference of UNESCO from 26 November until 10 December in Paris. He had the idea for the Unesco Courier which was published in several languages across the world, first as a tabloid and later as a magazine. Grierson was invited to open the Edinburgh International Film Festival in 1947, from 31 August to 7 September. At the start of 1948 he resigned from his position as director for Mass Communications and Public Information, he left in April to return to Britain.

=== Central Office of Information ===
In February 1948, Grierson was appointed the controller of the Central Office of Information's film operations to co-ordinate the work of the Crown Film Unit and Films Division, and to take overall charge of the planning, production and distribution of government films. On 23 June 1948, he accepted an honorary degree, an LL.D from the University of Glasgow. He left in 1950 due to financial restrictions on the documentaries that he wished to make.

=== Group 3 ===
Grierson was appointed to the position of executive producer of Group 3 at the end of 1950; it was a film production enterprise that received loans of government money through the National Film Finance Corporation. They filmed at Southall Studios in West London but later moved to Beaconsfield Studios. Group 3 was to have continuous production from 1951 until 1955 when it stopped producing films, the organisation had made a loss of over £400,000 as production of the films usually ran over the time allocated, and there had also been difficulty getting the films shown in cinemas.

During this time Grierson had been diagnosed with tuberculosis in May 1953, he spent a fortnight in hospital and then had a year of convalescing at his home, Tog Hill in Calstone. Grierson spent much of his time corresponding with the directors at Group 3, as well as commenting on scripts and story ideas. He had recovered enough to attend the Cannes Film Festival in April 1954, taking the production of Man of Africa. At the Edinburgh Film Festival in the same year, a dinner was held in Grierson's honour to celebrate twenty-five years of documentary.

=== Films of Scotland Committee ===
Grierson joined the newly revived Films of Scotland Committee in 1955. Also on the committee were Norman Wilson, Forsyth Hardy, George Singleton, C. A. Oakley and Neil Paterson. In 1956, Grierson was the president of the Venice Film Festival's jury; he was also jury president at the Cork Film Festival and the South American Film Festival in 1958. In 1957, Grierson received a special Canadian Film Award. Grierson wrote the script for, Seawards the Great Ships, which was directed by Hilary Harris and awarded an Academy Award in 1961, a feat for the Films of Scotland Committee.

=== This Wonderful World ===
The first programme of This Wonderful World was aired on 11 October 1957 in Scotland; it was on The Culbin Sands which focused on how the Forestry Commission had replanted six thousand acres of woodland along the mouth of Findhorn. In the seventeenth century wild sand had blown into the mouth and covered the land, the successful replanting of the forest was a great success for the commission. This Wonderful World was shown weekly, other topics for episodes included Leonardo da Vinci, ballet, king penguins and Norman McLaren's Boogie Doodle.

This Wonderful World began to be aired in England in February 1959, it ran for a further eight years and was in the Top Ten programmes for the week for the UK in 1960. In 1961, Grierson was appointed a Commander of the Order of the British Empire in the Queen's Birthday Honours. In 1962, he was a member of the jury for the Vancouver Film Festival, during his visit to Canada he also received the Royal Canadian Academy of Arts Medal for his contribution to the visual arts. In 1963, he was busy with This Wonderful World and the Films of Scotland Committee but still found time to attend the twenty-fifth anniversary of the National Film Board in Montreal.

In 1965, Grierson was the patron of the Commonwealth Film Festival which took place in Cardiff in that year. In 1966, he was offered the role of Governor of the British Film Institute; however, he turned down the position. This Wonderful World changed the title to John Grierson Presents.

In 1967, after returning from the Oberhausen Film Festival where he had been the President of Honour of the jury, Grierson suffered a bout of bronchitis which lasted eight days. His brother Anthony, who had trained to be a doctor was called and diagnosed Grierson with emphysema, his coughing fits were a cause for concern, and he was admitted to Manor Hospital. Grierson decided to give up smoking and drinking to benefit his health.

=== Later life ===
Grierson opened the new primary school at Cambusbarron on 10 October 1967; his sister Dorothy attended the day with him. The BBC expressed their wishes to make a programme about Grierson in the year of his seventieth birthday, which he turned down three times In the year of his seventieth birthday, Grierson received many tributes from across the globe. He was made an honorary member of the Association of Cinematograph, Television and Allied Technicians; he pressed for the ceremony to be held in Glasgow. He also received the Golden Thistle Award for Outstanding Achievement in the Art of Cinema at the Edinburgh Film Festival.

In January 1969, Grierson left for Canada to lecture at McGill University; enrollment for his classes grew to around seven hundred students. He also lectured at Carleton University once a fortnight. At Heriot-Watt University in Edinburgh on 8 July 1969, Grierson received an Honorary Doctorate of Literature. A few days earlier on 4 July 1969, Grierson had opened the Scottish Fisheries Museum in Anstruther.

Grierson was a member of the jury for the Canadian Film Awards in 1970. He spent a few months in 1971, travelling around India instilling the importance of having small production units throughout the country. He returned to the UK in December 1971 and was meant to travel back to India; however, his trip was delayed by the Indo-Pakistani War. Grierson went into hospital for a health check-up in January 1972; he was diagnosed with lung and liver cancer and was given months to live. During his time in hospital he spent time dictating letters to his wife, Margaret, and received visitors; however, he fell unconscious on 18 February and died on the 19th. In his wishes for his funeral he had detailed his desire to be cremated. Also according to his wishes, his urn was placed in the sea off the Old Head in Kinsale, and his brother Anthony, who had died in August 1971, had his ashes placed at the same time. A small flotilla followed the Able Seaman, which carried the ashes, and when the urns were lowered into the water, the fishing boats sounded their sirens.

The Grierson Archive at the University of Stirling Archives was opened by Angus Macdonald in October 1977.

== Filmography ==
=== As director ===
- Drifters (1929; first screened alongside the British premiere of Battleship Potemkin)
- Granton Trawler (1934)

=== As producer or other creative contributor ===
- O'er Hill and Dale (dir. Basil Wright 1932)
- UP-STREAM: A Story of the Scottish Salmon Fisheries (dir. Arthur Elton 1932)
- Cargo from Jamaica (dir. Basil Wright 1933)
- Industrial Britain (dir. Robert J. Flaherty 1933)
- Cable Ship (dir. Alexander Shaw and Stuart Legg 1933)
- Coming of the Dial (dir. Stuart Legg 1933)
- Liner Cruising South (dir. Basil Wright 1933)
- Man of Aran (dir. Robert J. Flaherty 1934)
- The New Operator (dir. Stuart Legg 1934)
- Pett and Pott (dir. Alberto Cavalcanti 1934)
- Post Haste (dir. Humphrey Jennings 1934)
- Spring Comes to England (dir. Donald Taylor 1934)
- 6.30 Collection (dir. Harry Watt and Edgar Anstey 1934)
- The Song of Ceylon (dir. Basil Wright 1934)
- A Colour Box (dir. Len Lye 1935)
- Introducing the Dial (dir. Stuart Legg 1935)
- Coal Face (dir. Alberto Cavalcanti 1935)
- B.B.C. Droitwich (dir. Harry Watt 1935)
- Night Mail (dir. Basil Wright and Harry Watt 1936)
- The Saving of Bill Blewitt (dir. Basil Wright 1936)
- Line To The Tschierva Hut (dir. Alberto Cavalcanti 1937)
- Children At School (dir. Basil Wright 1937)
- We Live In Two Worlds (dir. Alberto Cavalcanti 1937)
- Daily Round (dir. Richard Massingham and Karl Urbahn 1937)
- Trade Tattoo (dir. Len Lye 1937)
- The Face of Scotland (dir. Basil Wright 1938)
- The Children's Story (dir. Alexander Shaw 1938)
- Scotland for Fitness (dir. Brian Salt 1938)
- They Made the Land (dir. Mary Field 1938)
- Sport in Scotland (dir. Stanley L. Russell 1938)
- Wealth of a Nation (dir. Donald Alexander 1938)
- Sea Food (1938)
- The Londoners (dir. John Taylor 1939)
- Churchill's Island (dir. Stuart Legg 1941)
- Four Men in Prison (dir. Max Anderson 1950)
- Judgment Deferred (dir. John Baxter 1951)
- Brandy for the Parson (dir. John Eldridge 1952)
- The Brave Don't Cry (dir. Philip Leacock 1952)
- Miss Robin Hood (dir. John Guillermin 1952)
- You're Only Young Twice (dir. Terry Bishop 1952)
- Man of Africa (dir. Cyril Frankel 1953)
- Background (dir. Daniel Birt 1953)
- Laxdale Hall (dir. John Eldridge 1953)
- The Oracle (dir. C. M. Pennington-Richards 1953)
- Child's Play (dir. Margaret Thomson 1954)
- Devil on Horseback (dir. Cyril Frankel 1954)
- Rivers at Work (dir. Lew Davidson 1958)
- This Wonderful World (dir. various 1957–67)
- Seawards the Great Ships (dir. Hilary Harris 1960)
- The Heart of Scotland (dir. Laurence Henson 1961)
- Health of a City (dir. Derek Williams 1965)
- I Remember, I Remember (dir. James Sutherland 1968)
- The Image Makers (dir. Albert Kish 1980)
- Creative Process: Norman McLaren (dir. Donald McWilliams 1991)

== Works about Grierson ==
=== Books ===
- Grierson on Documentary (ed. Forsyth Hardy, Faber & Faber, 1946)
- John Grierson: A Documentary Biography (ed. Forsyth Hardy, Faber & Faber, 1979)
- John Grierson and the National Film Board: The Politics of Wartime Propaganda (ed. Gary Evans, University of Toronto Press, 1984)
- The Colonized Eye: Rethinking the Grierson Legend (ed. Joyce Nelson, Between the Lines, 1988)

=== Documentary films ===
- In a short film John Grierson at the NFT (1959) he recalls the British documentary film movement and is included in the Land of Promise Region 2 DVD set (BFI 2008).
- Hitchcock on Grierson (1965), in which Alfred Hitchcock talks about his work and how it inspired him.
- He was also the subject of a 1973 NFB documentary, Grierson, produced and directed by Roger Blais.

== Awards named for John Grierson ==
=== Grierson Documentary Film Awards ===
The Grierson Documentary Film Awards were established in 1972 to commemorate John Grierson and are currently supervised by The Grierson Trust. The aim of the awards is to recognise outstanding films that demonstrate integrity, originality and technical excellence, together with social or cultural significance.

Grierson Awards are presented annually in nine categories:

- Best Documentary on a Contemporary Issue
- Best Documentary on the Arts
- Best Historical Documentary
- Best Documentary on Science or the Natural World
- The Frontier Post Award for Most Entertaining Documentary
- Best Drama Documentary
- Best International Cinema Documentary
- Best Newcomer
- Trustees' Award

=== Other ===
The Canadian Film Awards had presented a Grierson Award for "an outstanding contribution to Canadian cinema in the spirit of John Grierson."

== See also ==
- Documentary News Letter, a publication founded by Grierson
- Edgar Anstey
- Arthur Elton
- Robert Flaherty
- Humphrey Jennings
- Stuart Legg
- Paul Rotha
- Basil Wright

== Sources ==
- Canada's Awards Database
- Credits from: British Film Institute Catalog (Film Index International)

Cultural offices
Preceded by New position	Government Film Commissioner and Chairperson of the National Film Board of Canada; 1939-1945	Succeeded by Ross McLean
