= Thirty Million Letters =

1963 documentary film by James Ritchie

- Directed by: James Ritchie
- Produced by: Edgar Anstey
- Production company: British Transport Films
- Distributed by: General Post Office
- Release date: 1963
- Running time: 30 minutes
- Country: United Kingdom
- Language: English

Thirty Million Letters (also known as 30 Million Letters) is a 1963 British short documentary film directed by James Ritchie and made by British Transport Films.

== Accolades ==
The film received a certificate of merit in the Documentary class at the 1963 Cork International Film Festival.

In 1964 it was nominated for an Academy Award for Best Documentary Short.

== Home media ==
It is available as an extra on the 2007 British Film Institute DVD Night Mail.
