= Organism (film) =

Short documentary film

- Directed by: Hilary Harris
- Distributed by: Phoenix Films Inc.
- Release date: 1975
- Running time: 20 min
- Country: United States

Organism is a short creative documentary film from 1975 made by Hilary Harris.

== Description ==
Harris spent 15 years creating this short time-lapse film, which depicts Manhattan as a living entity. Completed in 1975, it's noted for its portrayal of New York City during its earlier period and is considered a precursor to Godfrey Reggio's Koyaanisqatsi (1982). The film employs time-lapse photography to convey a sense of continuous movement, presenting the city as a dynamic force of energy and renewal. It portrays Manhattan as a vast organism pulsating with life, drawing in those who seek to explore or conquer it.

An aspect that stands out in Organism is its synthesizer soundtrack, composed by David Hollister. It complements the visuals, adding depth to the viewing experience.

== Plot ==
Organism is a macrocosmic view of New York City which makes an analogy between living tissue and the structure of the city. Traffic arteries are seen as the bloodstream circulating through the urban body and its skyscrapers as the skeletal structure. The city's escalators, streets, railroad lines, shops, markets, bridges, beaches and parades are seen as parts of a delicately balanced living structure.

== Reception ==
Critics notes upon the first views in 1976:

"most recent evidence of film genius are privileged to see reality in a new way ... the trip we have experienced is an incredible mind-expanding one of beauty .." (Previews -February 1976)

"it never moves ... to a conclusive theoretical statement, nor does it vary anything technically " (The Booklist- March 15, 1976)
