= Seawards the Great Ships =

1961 film by Hilary Harris

- Directed by: Hilary Harris
- Written by: John Grierson; Cliff Hanley
- Narrated by: Kenneth Kendall; Bryden Murdoch
- Production company: Templar Films
- Distributed by: Central Office of Information
- Release date: 1961
- Running time: 28 minutes
- Country: United Kingdom
- Language: English

Seawards the Great Ships is a 1961 British short documentary film directed by Hilary Harris. It was written by John Grierson and Cliff Hanley, and produced by Glasgow-based Templar Films for the Clyde Shipbuilders' Association and the Central Office of Information (COI).

== Synopsis ==
The film chronicles the shipbuilding industry of the River Clyde during the early 1960s, featuring footage from the Fairfield Shipbuilding and Engineering Company, John Brown & Company and Scotts Shipbuilding and Engineering Company.

It includes dialogue between shipyard workers, but this is scripted. The intention had been to use genuine dialogue, but this included too many swearwords to be usable.

== Cast ==
- Kenneth Kendall as narrator (worldwide version)
- Bryden Murdoch as narrator (original Scottish version)

== Reception ==
The Monthly Film Bulletin wrote: "The chief merit of Seawards the Great Ships is that it tries to give its subject, the life and work of the Clyde shipbuilders, a fresh look and a smart turn-out. Visually, it often succeeds. ... Its American director, Hilary Harris ...has also given it a surface of fashionable editing effects and clever sound-mixing. If this were the extent of the film's ambition, there might be little cause for complaint, but it tries to be human and intimate and here it goes sadly astray. Part of the fault lies with the commentary, an over-written mélange of highflown phrases delivered in a deep, earnest voice. ... More seriously, the tentative attempt to make the men themselves spring to life through disjointed, casual scraps of conversation suggests a miscalculation in feeling rather than technique."

Boxoffice wrote: "A magnificently filmed documentary produced for the British government and the Clyde Shipbuilders Ass'n in Scotland, this will make a strong supporting subject for any art house feature. The camerawork in Eastman Color has rarely been surpassed as regards exciting camera angles of the craftsmanship and effort that go into the construction of ships of all sizes. The finale, as the last wooden supports are removed and a giant ship goes down the ways into the River Clyde towards the sea, is a breath-taking moment."

== Accolades ==
- The St Finbarr statuette at the 1960 Cork Film Festival.
- The 1962 Oscar for Best Short Live Action Subject, the first Scottish film to win an Academy Award.
- The National Library of Scotland catalogue lists a further 18 festival awards.

== Home media ==
The film was released onto Blu-ray by Panamint in 2010 as part of their 'Faces of Scotland' compilation.
