= The Song of Ceylon =

- Directed by: Basil Wright
- Written by: Robert Knox (commentary, excerpt from "An Historical Relation of Ceylon")
- Produced by: John Grierson
- Narrated by: Lionel Wendt
- Cinematography: Basil Wright; John Taylor
- Edited by: Basil Wright
- Music by: Walter Leigh
- Production company: GPO Film Unit
- Release date: 1934
- Running time: 38 minutes
- Country: United Kingdom
- Language: English

The Song of Ceylon is a 1934 British documentary film directed by Basil Wright and produced by John Grierson for the Ceylon Tea Propaganda Board. It was written by Robert Knox.

The film was shot on location in Ceylon (Sri Lanka) at the start of 1934 and completed at the GPO film studios in Blackheath, London.

== Plot ==
The film chronicles the cultural life and religious customs of the Sinhalese and the effects of advanced industrialism on such customs.

The first part of the film depicts the religious life of the Sinhalese, interlinking the Buddhist rituals with the natural beauty of Ceylon. Opening with a series of pans over palm leaves, we then gradually see people journey to Adam's Peak, a center of Buddhist pilgrimage for over two hundred years. This is continually inter-cut with images of surrounding natural beauty and a series of pans of a Buddhist statue.

Part two focuses on the working life of the Sinhalese, again continually stressing their intimate connection to the surrounding environment. We see people engaging in pottery, woodcarving and the building of houses, whilst children play.

The third part of the film introduces the arrival of modern communications systems into the fabric of this 'natural' lifestyle, heralded by experimental sounds and shots of industrial working practices.

In the final part of the film, we return to the cultural life of the Sinhalese, where people perform a traditional Kandyan dance. The film ends as it began, panning over palm trees.

== Cast ==
- Lionel Wendt as narrator
- Alberto Cavalcanti as voice of commerce
- John Grierson as voice of commerce
- Stuart Legg as voice of commerce
- Basil Wright as voice of commerce

== Critical reception ==
The Monthly Film Bulletin wrote: "The direction, photography and editing of this film place it in a class by itself as an imaginative, and at the same time, strictly documentary, presentation of the island of Ceylon. Its very excellence would probably make it unsuitable for educational purposes except for senior forms of secondary schools and for adult education institutions. Film Societies will welcome it and it should prove widely popular at most cinemas."

Kine Weekly wrote: "Another interest feature which fully Iives up to the standard set by previous John Grierson productions. It gives a vivid idea of the beauty of the country, and also introduces native customs and traditions in a manner which keeps one thoroughly interested. ... The camera work is a notable highlight in the film. It is used imaginatively and with an eye all the time to artistic effect. There is, however, no straining after weird camera angles. The settings are so beautiful that they inspire a very definite longing to visit Ceylon."

Writing for The Spectator in 1935, Graham Greene described the film as "an example to all directors of perfect construction and the perfect application of montage", and noted that it "moves with the air of absolute certainty in its object and assurance in its method".

Variety wrote: "This thorough-going four-reel travelogue on Ceylon attempts to dig down deep and cinematically explain the country and its people in more thorough manner than customarily encountered in the usual and surface-skimming type of film. Unfortunately, it is just a shade too arty and the only spot for it is in that sort of the house. Had some of the hard-headed realistic March of Time approach ben used, film would have come off much better. As it stands the fancy and at times fantastic treatment will largely mystify audiences. In view of the splendid camera work and some of the sequences, notably the native dancers and religious devotions to Buddha, pic should have been aimed at the general public. Effort to explain the economics and commerce of Ceylon badly muddled through extensive use of vague or bewildering symbolisms."
