= Hilary Harris =

American filmmaker (1929–1999)

Hilary Tjader Harris (December 9, 1929 – October 26, 1999) was a documentary filmmaker, one of the pioneers of time-lapse photography. The documentary, Seawards the Great Ships, directed by Harris, won the Academy Award for Best Live Action Short Film in 1962. The Squeeze (1964), a short experimental film about overpopulation won a Golden Gate Award for best fiction at the San Francisco Film Festival in 1964.

== Filmography ==
- Longhorn (1951)
- Generation (1956)
- Highway (1958)
- Polaris Action 1960
- Seawards the Great Ships (1961)
- The Dialogues of Archibald Macleish and Mark Van Doren (1962)
- The Walk (1962)
- The Farmer and I (1963)
- Seas of Sweet Water (1964)
- The Squeeze (1964)
- The Draft Card Burners (circa 1965)
- Patterns for Communication (1966)
- 9 Variations on a Dance Theme (1966)
- The Nuer (1970)
- Organism (1975)
- Technology in Public Service (1976)
- South Street Seaport (1976)

== Notes ==
A DVD, titled The Films of Hilary Harris, was released by Mystic Fire Video in 2006. The four films on the DVD are Organism, 9 Variations, Highway and Longhorn. The DVD also includes an interview with Harris, which contains the short films Generation and Highway.
