= Edgar Anstey =

British documentary filmmaker (1907–1987)

Edgar Anstey OBE (16 February 1907 – 26 September 1987), was a leading British documentary filmmaker.

Anstey was born in Watford, Hertfordshire, England in 1907, and was educated at Watford Grammar School for Boys and Birkbeck College.

He spent a few years as a civil servant before starting in 1930 at The Empire Marketing Board's film unit, under the direction of John Grierson.

He was the uncredited co-director of the "seminal 1935 'social problem' film" Housing Problems. In 1949, he joined the British Transport Films unit, which he headed until 1974. He also served on the Board of Governors of the British Film Institute.

As a producer he was twice-nominated for an Academy Award, for Best Documentary Short Subject in 1964 for Thirty Million Letters and Best Short Subject, Live Action for Snow in 1966

Anstey died in London, England in 1987.

== See also ==
- Alberto Cavalcanti
- Arthur Elton
- British Transport Films
- John Grierson
- Humphrey Jennings
- Wolfgang Suschitzky
