= Basil Wright =

English documentary filmmaker (1907–1987)

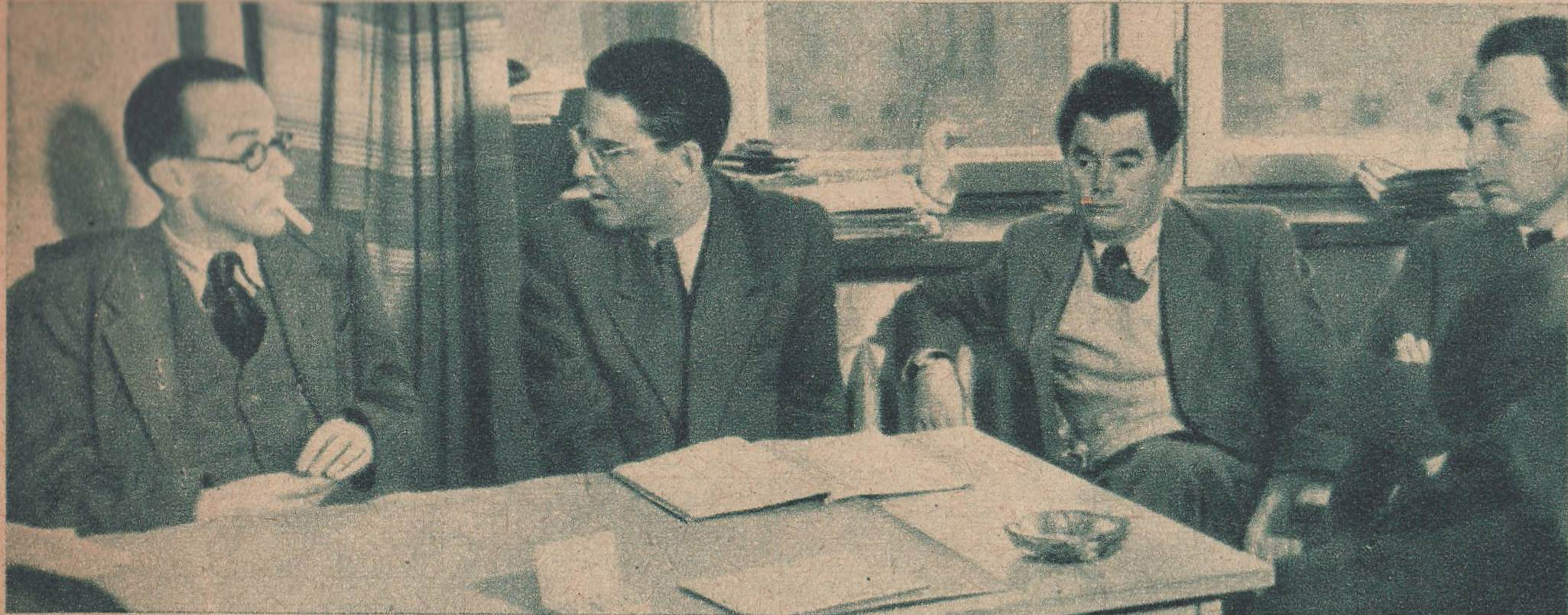
Conference of "World Union of documentary films" in 1948 Warsaw: Basil Wright (on the left), Elmar Klos, Joris Ivens and Jerzy Toeplitz.

Basil Charles Wright (12 June 1907 – 14 October 1987) was an English documentary filmmaker, film historian, film critic and teacher.

== Biography ==
Basil Wright was born in Sutton, Surrey in 1907. After leaving Sherborne School, a well known independent school in the market town of Sherborne in Dorset, Basil Wright attended Corpus Christi College, Cambridge, as a Mawson scholar in 1926 to read classics. He took a first in part one of the classical tripos (1928) and a third in part two of economics (1929). Upon leaving Cambridge he was the first recruit to join John Grierson at the Empire Marketing Board's film unit in 1930. Wright's 1934 film Song of Ceylon is his most celebrated work. Shot on location in Ceylon (now Sri Lanka) the film was completed with the composer Walter Leigh at the GPO Film Unit in London. At the GPO, Wright acted as producer and wrote the script for Night Mail (1936) for which he received a joint directorial credit with Harry Watt. Wright had introduced his friend W. H. Auden to the film unit and the poet's verse was included in the film.

Wright left the GPO to form his own production company, The Realist Film Unit (RFU). There he directed Children at School with money from the Gas Industry and The Face of Scotland for The Films of Scotland Committee.

During World War II, Wright worked only as a producer, first at John Grierson's Film Centre before joining The Crown Film Unit between 1945 and 1946 as producer-in-charge. Among the best known films he produced for Crown are Humphrey Jennings' A Diary for Timothy (1946) and A Defeated People (1946) and Instruments of the Orchestra (1946) featuring Benjamin Britten's The Young Person's Guide to the Orchestra. Returning to direction in the early 1950s, his films included Waters of Time (1951) made for the Festival of Britain, World Without End (1953) directed with Paul Rotha for UNESCO and Greece: The Immortal Land (1958) in collaboration with his friend the artist Michael Ayrton.

Writing throughout the 1930s and 1940s, Basil Wright had contributed to the theoretical development of documentary in the movement's journals Cinema Quarterly, World Film News and Documentary Newsletter. He was the film critic for The Spectator after Graham Greene left. Wright was a regular contributor to the British Film Institute's Sight and Sound during the 1940s and '50s. He published a small book: The Uses of Film (1948) and his personal (extensive) history of cinema The Long View (1974). He taught at the University of Southern California (1962 and 1968), The National Film and Television School in London (1971–1973) and Temple University in Philadelphia (1977–1978). He was Governor of the British Film Institute, a fellow of the British Film Academy and President of the International Association of Documentary Filmmakers.

In his films Wright combined an ability to look closely and carefully at a subject with a poetic and often experimental approach to editing and sound. In Britain he is commemorated with a film prize awarded biennially by the Royal Anthropological Institute.

Wright died in Frieth, Buckinghamshire, England in 1987.

== Centenary celebrations ==
In honour of Basil Wright's centenary year, his career, and the careers of his colleagues and fellow centenarians: Edgar Anstey, Marion Grierson, Humphrey Jennings and Paul Rotha, were celebrated with a season of films between August and October 2007 at the British Film Institute in London. Following this season, the BFI released a four-disc DVD set Land of Promise, containing films from leading figures in the British Documentary Film movement. A further three volumes of GPO films are available from the Bfi.

== Films by Basil Wright online ==
You can watch Song of Ceylon on the Colonial Film: Moving Images of the British Empire Website here: Entry for Basil Wright's Song of Ceylon.

If you have institutional access to the British Film Institute's Screenonline or Inview Websites you can watch a number of Wright's other films online. Further links below.

== Filmography as director ==
- Conquest (1930)
- "Wright, Basil (1907-1987) Biography". BFI Screenonline. The Country Comes To Town. Archived from the original on 7 September 2009.
- O'er Hill and Dale *Bfi's Screenonline links to the Film.
- Liner Cruising South
- Cargo From Jamaica
- Windmill in Barbados
- Song of Ceylon (1934) *Available on the Bfi Addressing The Nation DVD Boxset *Or Watch Online at the Colonial Film Website
- Children at School *Available on the BFI Land of Promise DVD Boxset
- The Face of Scotland (1938) *Available from Scottish Screen
- Bernard Miles on Gun Dogs
- Waters of Time (1951) *Available from Museum in Docklands, London
- World Without End (Co-directed with Paul Rotha).
- The Stained Glass at Fairford *Watch at the Arts Council Film Collection
- Greece: The Immortal Land (1959)
- Greek Sculpture: 3000 BC to 300 BC (1959)
- A Place For Gold (1960)

== Selected filmography as producer ==
- The Fairy of the Phone (1936) (*Available on the Bfi We Live in Two Worlds DVD Boxset)
- Night Mail (1936) (*Available on DVD from the Bfi)
- Rainbow Dance (1936)
- Men of Africa (1940)
- The Harvest Shall Come (1942)
- London Scrapbook (1942)
- A Diary for Timothy (1945)
- A Defeated People (1946)
- Children on Trial (1946)

== See also ==
- W. H. Auden
- Michael Ayrton
- Edgar Anstey
- Benjamin Britten
- Charles Burnett (director)
- Alberto Cavalcanti
- John Grierson
- Robert Flaherty
- Humphrey Jennings
- Stuart Legg
- Walter Leigh
- Muir Mathieson
- Bernard Miles
- Paul Rotha
- Harry Watt
