= Empire Marketing Board =

Organization

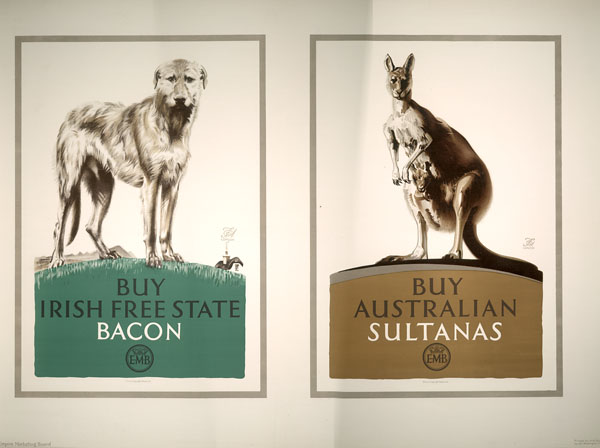
'Buy Irish Free State Bacon, Buy Australian Sultanas' - Empire Marketing Board poster.

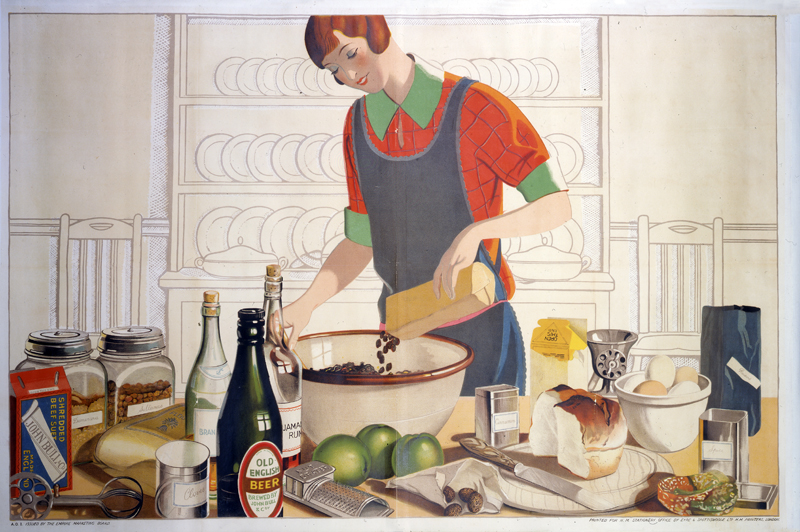
'Making the Empire Christmas pudding', artwork by F C Harrison produced for the Empire Marketing Board

The Empire Marketing Board was formed in May 1926 by the Colonial Secretary Leo Amery to promote intra-Empire trade and to persuade consumers to 'Buy Empire'. It was established as a substitute for tariff reform and protectionist legislation and this is why it was eventually abolished in 1933, as a system of imperial preference replaced free trade. During its brief existence, the Empire Marketing Board was unsuccessful in raising Britain's imports of products from the Empire.

== Overview ==
Amery was its first chairman, Sir Stephen George Tallents its secretary, Edward Mayow Hastings Lloyd its assistant secretary, and Walter Elliot was chairman of its research committee.

The EMB had three principal aims:

- to support scientific research;
- promotion of economic analysis; and
- publicity for Empire trade.

In 1925 the Imperial Economic Committee; a board which hosted representatives from the Dominions and Britain; conceived the Empire Marketing Board to generate public support for purchasing Empire goods. The committee wrote “that the grant of £1 million per annum should be spent by an ‘executive commission’ which would undertake a ‘national movement’ to increase Empire buying by the British public”. The Empire Marketing Board would implement its budget on a variety of projects including scientific research and advertisement. The clear purpose of the Empire Marketing Board was to boost Empire trade through the promotion of Dominion and British goods while also improving their production to become more advantageous to foreign competition. The Empire Marketing Board's formal objectives were declared shortly after its creation in saying that scientific research and marketing tactics were primary objectives for the board to assist private industries across the Empire. This message is found in the first annual report of the Empire Marketing Board with an address by Secretary Stephen Tallents who wrote

Fundamentally the stimulation of Empire marketing must depend on the private enterprise of producers and traders… The best service that can be done to the Empire producer is to place freely at his disposal the resources of science and economic investigation – to see that he is made aware of sowing and planting, of tending and harvesting; to show him how his produce should be graded and packed to ensure that it is transported safely and without deterioration: to suggest lastly how its presentation, in the shop window or on the counter, may be fitted to win the housewife’s critical eye.

== Scientific research ==
Scientific research took up a large proportion of the EMB's work and budget. It also assisted 126 agricultural and medical research projects and issued many Intelligence Notes, pamphlets and surveys. In 1931 Walter Elliot of the Royal Society detailed the research programs of the Empire Marketing Board in saying that

a large group of grants is made towards the fostering of Central Institutions are trained, such as Cambridge University and the Imperial College of Tropical Agriculture in Trinidad. For these two purposes £189,000 has been pledged. Another example is a grant of £65,000 for the study of animal health problems, to Onderstepoort Station at Pretoria, the sum of £58,000 to a wide investigation into the deficiencies of natural pasture centred at the Rowett Institute at Aberdeen, and £160,000 to the Low Temperature Research Station at Cambridge, with its allied Cold Store at East Malling in Kent.

The mandate to focus on scientific research would prove to be a large undertaking when accompanied by an aggressive advertising campaign that would run until 1933. The scientific research was large and widespread across the Empire encompassing a multitude of the branches of the sciences with large amounts of funding put into each program.

The research would continue across the Empire with investigations into improving Empire production and industry with large amounts of funding until 1933 with the closure of the Empire Marketing Board.

The EMB made links with buyers and produced analyses of markets to help producers. Tallents decided that EMB's staff should employ personnel directly from the media and the advertising industry – as well as giving commissions to some of the most talented poster artists of the day.

== Advertisement campaigns ==
The EMB organised poster campaigns, exhibitions, 'Empire Shopping Weeks', Empire shops, lectures, radio talks, schools tour, its own library, advertisements in the national and local press and of shop window displays. Most famous was the EMB film unit led by John Grierson, often considered the father of modern documentary film, which produced around 100 films with such names as Solid Sunshine (which promoted New Zealand butter), Drifters (North Sea herring), The Song of Ceylon (tea), Wheatfields of the Empire, Industrial Britain and One Family. None of the "empire shops" proposed in the 1920s ever opened. A public art exhibit in 2016 used the empire shops as a way of thinking about postcolonialism and globalization.

Efforts by the Empire Marketing Board to increase consumer purchasing of Empire produced goods was pursued through a large scale aggressive advertisement campaign. The primary method of advertisement came through the use of posters and printed media with large print and vibrant colours to entice consumers. The posters were uniquely designed as the Empire Marketing Board “used a series of five posters in a sequence, a little like a cartoon strip, with each of the posters telling a part of the story in pictures, or with copy and slogans… erected in over 1700 sites, in 450 British cities and towns”. This ad campaign flooded British markets and was to a lesser extent across to the Dominions. The messaging on the posters was tailored to men and women separately in order to support the old styled imagery connected to the Empire. The posters that were released by the Empire Marketing Board “depicted men as ‘Empire Builders’ and showed women buying empire products, especially food. The idea of women as citizen-consumers was spread further by the BBC's Household Talks in 1928 in collaboration with the EMB to encourage and instruct women in the use of empire materials and goods”. These advertisements attempted to use bold colours and stir patriotic feelings amongst citizens of the Empire but the effectiveness of the campaign also drew criticism.

Colonial governments were reluctant to join the EMB, however. Some Dominions of the Empire protested that the posters did not have an effect on their exports and there were unintended effects. The government of New Zealand reported that the poster series were “ineffective as sellers of produce and of little practical value… The whole empire propaganda work is carried out from the political angle of impressing the dominions with what it is doing rather than from the point of selling Empire Produce”. What opinions may exist about the Empire Marketing Board and its short campaign for inter-Empire trade did have a lasting impact through the posters, shopping weeks, radio shows and numerous other advertisements it ran.

The EMB was ended September 1933 as a result of government cuts and the introduction of Imperial Preference. The film unit was moved to GPO, and during World War II was reorganised into the Crown Film Unit.

There is a collection of the EMB's posters at the Manchester Art Gallery and some originals at the Victoria Falls Hotel, Zimbabwe, as well as the National Archives of Canada.

== Gallery ==
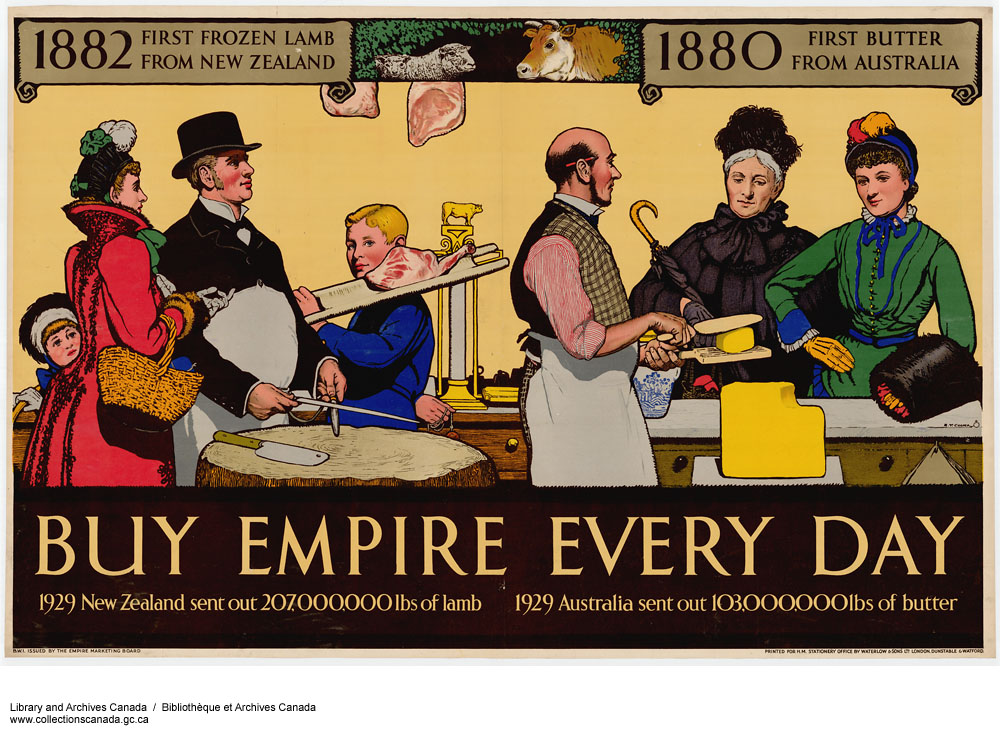
1882 First Frozen Lamb from New Zealand, 1880 First Butter from Australia, by R. T. Cooper, London, Dunstable and Watford, England, United Kingdom, circa 1926–1934. Color lithograph on wove paper.

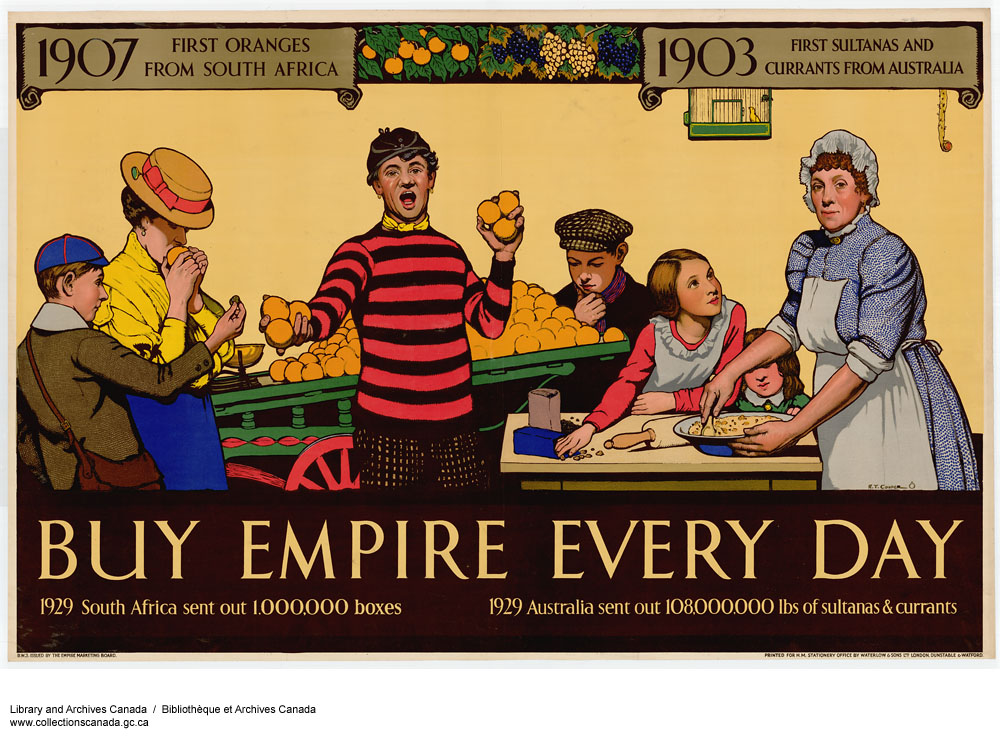
"1907 First Oranges from South Africa, 1903 First Sultanas and Currants from Australia: Buy Empire Every Day" by R.T. Cooper, London, Dunstable and Watford, England, United Kingdom, circa 1926–1934. Color lithograph on wove paper

"The Good Shopper " by F.N., London, Dunstable and Watford, England, United Kingdom, CIRCA 1926–1934. Color lithograph on wove paper.

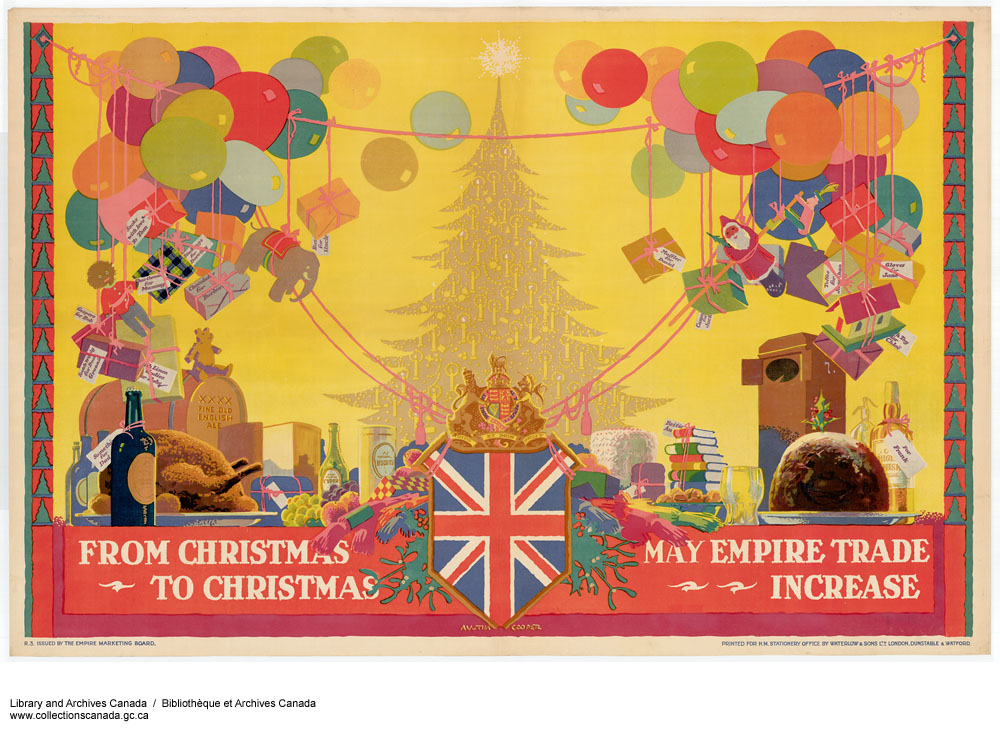
From Christmas to Christmas. May Empire Trade Increase, by Austin Cooper, London, Dunstable and Watford, England, United Kingdom, circa 1926–1934. Color lithograph on wove paper

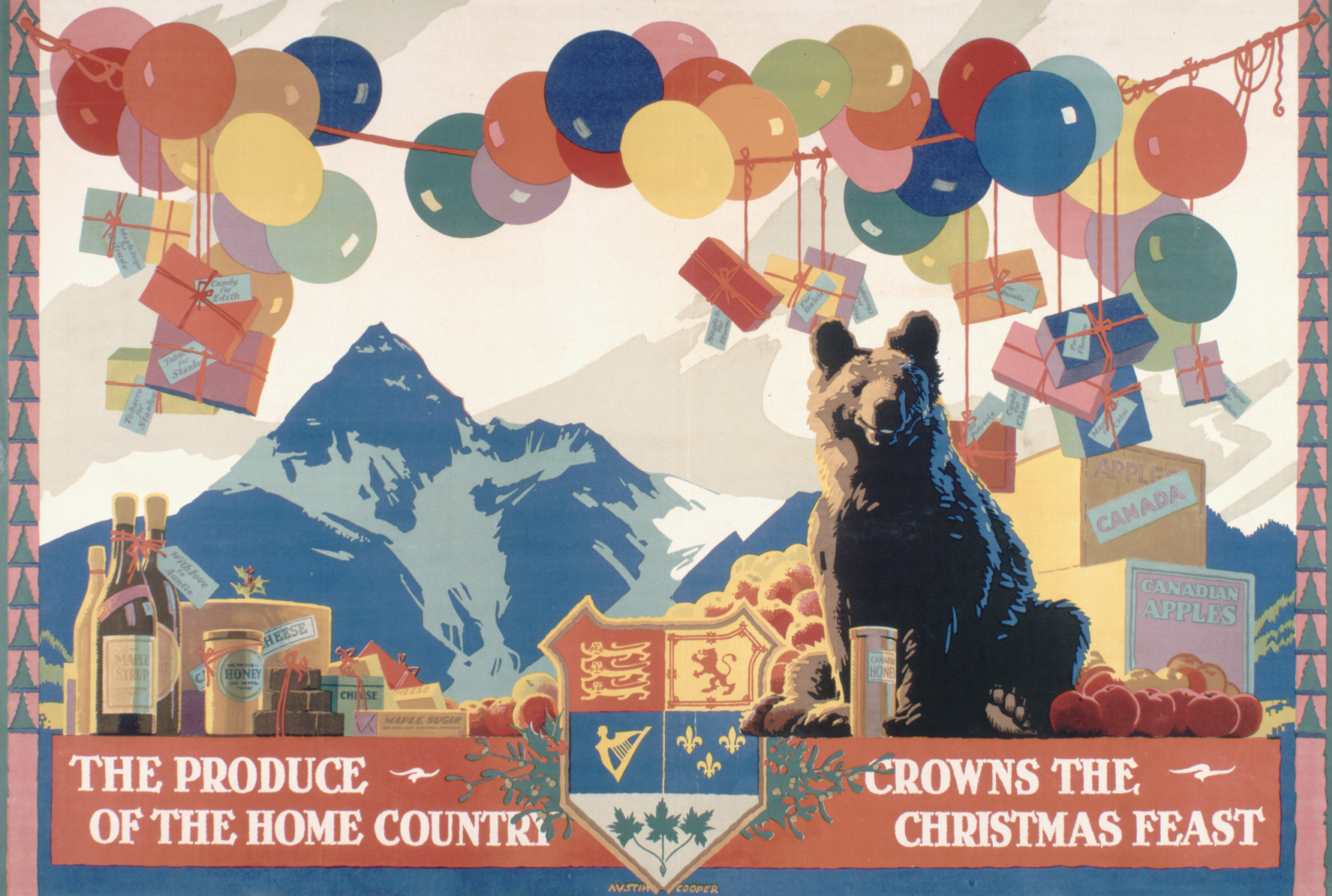
The Produce of the Home Country Crowns the Christmas Feast, by Austin Cooper, London, Dunstable and Watford, England, United Kingdom, circa 1926–1934. Color lithograph on wove paper.

"The Empire Christmas Pudding: A Christmas Pudding Recipe", London, England, United Kingdom. Circa 1926–1934, color lithograph on wove paper.

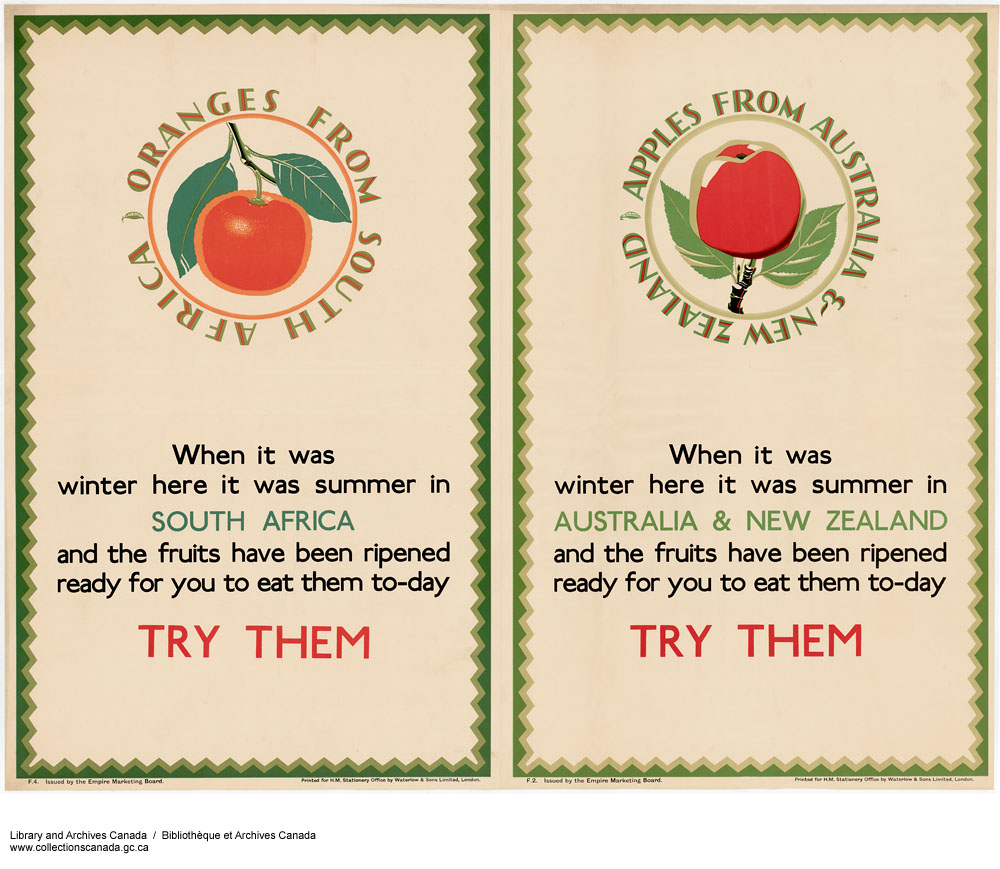

== See also ==
- Colonial goods store
