= Études des mouvements à Paris =

1927 film

- Directed by: Joris Ivens
- Release date: 1927
- Country: France
- Language: Silent

Études des mouvements à Paris is a 1927 city symphony film directed, shot, and edited by Dutch filmmaker Joris Ivens. Its original Dutch name is Bewegingsstudie van varkeer te Parijs. The film depicts the city of Paris during the summertime, with an emphasis on its traffic, intersections, and street life. Notably using a variety of camera angles, Ivens attempts to capture the movement of street life in Paris.

== Production ==
The film was produced by Ivens in the summer of 1927 while visiting photographer Germaine Krull. Many similarities can be seen between Études des mouvements and Krull's photography, most notably the high-angle shots of busy intersections and tram tracks. Photographs with these features would be published in Krull's 1929 photo book 100 x Paris.

== Themes and interpretations ==
As opposed to Ivens' later work within the city symphony genre (such as Rain and The Bridge) Études des mouvements is less observational and demonstrates qualities of cinéma pur, a term created by French actor, screenwriter, and director Henri Chomette. This type of filmmaking, which emerged in Paris during the 1920s and early 1930s emphasizes the formal aspects of filmmaking like motion, visual composition, and rhythm.

The film can be seen as a cinematic equivalent to the notion of the flâneur. The repetition of planning and tilting naturalistically in conjunction with shooting on a handheld Kinamo camera simulates the view of an idle walker, showing the city from an onlooker's view.
