= Rain (1929 film) =

1929 film

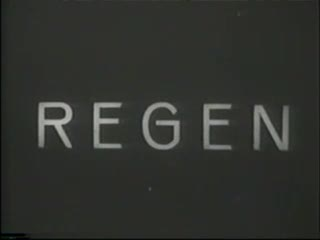
- Title card
- Directed by: Mannus Franken; Joris Ivens
- Written by: Mannus Franken; Joris Ivens
- Cinematography: Joris Ivens
- Edited by: Joris Ivens
- Music by: Lou Lichtveld
- Release date: 14 December 1929
- Running time: 12 minutes
- Country: Netherlands
- Language: Dutch

Rain (Dutch: Regen [ˈreːɣə(n)]) is a 1929 Dutch short documentary film directed by Mannus Franken and Joris Ivens. It premiered on 14 December 1929, in the Amsterdam Filmliga's theater, De Uitkijk.

== Historical significance and context ==
Regen has four key elements that have cemented its place in documentary history: its place in the long career of director Joris Ivens, the Dutch Film Canon, the city symphony film movement, and the history of avant-garde documentaries.

Joris Ivens lived from 1898 to 1989 and in that time created thirteen noteworthy documentaries, whose interrelation and evolution loosely model the trajectory of documentary film as a whole. Over his career, he made art films, commercial films, political documentaries, war (and indeed anti-war) documentaries. His final film, A Tale of the Wind, was an autobiographical piece contemplating the divide between realism and fantasy.

Additionally, Ivens was one of the inaugural voices of Dutch Film, establishing traditions in the form of content and formal effects that have continued to define films from the Netherlands. First among these is the painterly heritage of the Dutch. From the intimate realism of the Dutch Masters to Impressionism, Pointillism, and De Stijl, the Netherlands have a rich history of skilled and pioneering artists, including such household names as Rembrandt, Van Gogh and M. C. Escher. Ivens's attention to composition is demonstrative not only of his three-generation family history of photography, but of his national heritage as well. Dutch films are inward-looking, that is, they feature Dutch subjects, Dutch settings, and Dutch conflicts, to include a love-hate struggle with the elements that has been a part of Dutch culture as long as the canals and windmills on which the Netherlands depends.

Ivens also established a tradition of craftsmanship in the form of a rigorous organization of shots that likely owes its effectiveness and visibility to Ivens's belief in the conclusions of the Kuleshov-Pudovkin experiment. The Pudovkin experiment led to one of the key tenets of Soviet Montage—that when cutting shots together, 2+2=5, which is to say a synthesis of two shots may incite a response independent of the response to either shot alone.

Regen was one of the founding voices of avant-garde documentary, and perhaps the fullest realization of the filmic tradition of City Symphony. While often noted for their politics, the aesthetics of City Symphonies such as Alberto Cavalcanti's Rien que les heures (1926), Walter Ruttmann's Berlin: Symphony of a Metropolis (1927), and Dziga Vertov's Man with a Movie Camera (1929) also attempt to arrest the viewer's perception and create a highly formalistic visual poetry. While striving for what amounts to peak formalism, Regen differs from other city films in that its focus is subtly shifted from city life to the rainstorm itself, and how it transforms the city. Its subjects are numerous and anonymous, and few shots identify the setting of the film as Amsterdam, focusing instead on raindrops, clouds, and other small details of the rain's interaction with the city.

== Production conditions ==
Though Ivens mostly produced Regen by his own means, his involvement with the Amsterdam Filmliga was key to his studies of good practice and interest in formal experiments. In 1927, Henrik Scholte proposed the foundation of the Filmliga in the interest of showing highly avant-garde films and Soviet films which were banned in the West. The Filmliga's manifesto, written by Scholte himself, suggested first and foremost that a filmmaker is an artist above all things. As one of the founding board members of the Film League, Ivens traveled around European capitals and met many filmmakers whose enthusiasm, along with that of the Dutch members of the Filmliga, encouraged him to further involve himself in producing films. Ivens hosted the library of the Film League in his attic and was able to read film theory and, at his editing bench, study filmmaking practically.

Ivens's practical knowledge came not only from these home editing experiments, but also from his inheritance of his family's photography business, which had allowed him to study under several celebrated manufacturers of photographic equipment. One such manufacturer was Emanuel Goldberg, inventor of the Kinamo camera, which derived its name from Greek and Latin: "kine" and "amo", meaning "I love movies". Ivens worked on the assembly line for the camera and acknowledged Goldberg's influence on his entire career. Of the camera, he wrote: "with my camera held in my hand, the marvelous Kinamo of Professor Goldberg, I was, naturally, freed from the rigidity of a tripod, and I had given movement to what, normally, would have had to be a succession of fixed shots. Without knowing it, filming flexibly and without stopping, I had achieved a continuity. That day I realized that the camera was an eye and I said to myself, 'If it is a gaze, it ought to be a living one.'”

Ivens completed many of his manufacturing apprenticeships in Berlin, involving himself not only with the photography industry, but with the creative and political scene of Weimar Germany. By the time Ivens arrived in Berlin, it was 1921. The 1918 revolution of workers and soldiers had failed and the Weimar Republic was already perceived as a sham. Trust in the divided government only worsened as the Deutsche Mark's value dropped drastically against the dollar and Ivens' Dutch Guilders, the increasing value of which helped him to enthusiastically subscribe to the darkly carnivalesque sociocultural atmosphere of the Weimar era. After a day of classes (in which he recalls a professor openly snorting cocaine before beginning a lecture), Ivens and friends—artists, publishers, poets, anarchists, Marxists, radical Communists—might see a revue at the Apollo Theater or go to the cinema to see an expressionist film by Wiene or Murnau.

Though the Weimar lifestyle did not suit Ivens for very long, features of expressionism and its parent and predecessor, the avant-garde, are clearly visible in Rain. At this time, the avant-garde movement was just being taken up by filmmakers, who were making new discoveries daily about the artistic potential of filmmaking. These filmmakers no longer wanted to produce vapid pieces created simply to entertain the masses. Instead, they sought expression through a film's rhythm and movement—the characteristics which, according to these artists, made film a unique medium. They believed a film could create its own world, whether through thought–provoking Absurdism in a piece like Buñuel and Dalí's Un Chien Andalou or purely through form, as in Dziga Vertov's Man with a Movie Camera. Rain closely adheres to this prioritization of a film's formalistic qualities. The short film focuses primarily on composition and rhythm, visually following the patterns of raindrops and people as they try to negotiate with each other in their movements through the city. Ivens's efforts to create what amounts to a visual poem, or perhaps a moving painting, led to his being termed a poet-engineer by fellow Filmliga members.

Ivens created the film with the help of two other men not often credited for their assistance with the production: Cheng Fai, Ivens's housekeeper, and a young John Ferno, known then as Fernhout. Cheng Fai often ventured out with Ivens—he outfitted in an oilskin and boots, Cheng Fai equipped with an umbrella—to assist with gathering footage in the rain, protecting the camera and film from water damage. Ferno was sent to Ivens by Ferno's mother, who was worried about her son after he performed poorly in school. She was hoping Ivens would help the boy use his time more productively and teach him a new skill. Ivens put him to work riding a bike through rainy Amsterdam while Ivens shot. Ferno went on to do more professional work with Ivens, including some work on The Spanish Earth.

== Aesthetic context ==
Regen (1929)

Regen is an example of the popular city symphony film. City Symphonies like those created by Ruttman, Cavalcanti, and Vertov vary, evidently, in the cities featured, but also in their treatment of their subjects and the prominence of the director's voice in the piece: Ruttman's film made Berlin itself the main character, while Vertov's film is highly reflexive, often featuring the director and his brother working the camera through stunts and trick shots. These films were created in conjunction with the avant-garde movement and emergence of formalism, and accordingly focus on aesthetic properties more than content.

For Regen, these aesthetic properties are reflected in the construction and the creativity of the film. It has a loosely narrative structure: it first presents the viewer with a situation: Amsterdam, its rooftops, its canals, and fleetingly, its residents going about their business. Next, the viewer is presented with an incident: slowly, raindrops begin to send minuscule ripples through a canal, a breeze picks up, birds take flight. Rain falls harder and we begin to take closer, longer looks at individuals adapting to their changed environment. The shots are mostly anonymous—faces passing quickly and blending into crowds as umbrellas are raised. As the streets clear (the film was shot over months but we are made to feel this is all happening over the course of an afternoon), focus shifts to rain's interaction with nature and architecture—filling the dams, flowing through gutter pipes, obscuring the view of Amsterdam's rooftops. And finally, we return to the status quo: though evidence of the storm remains—the streets are still silvered and all the guardrails hold drops of water—the canals have returned to a glassy calm and everywhere people are emerging from indoors. Amsterdam is vibrant and lively once again.

Ivens meticulously composes the shots that make up all of Regen's fourteen minutes. Much attention is paid, for example, to reflections. Silhouettes pass upside down across the top of the screen, women with shopping carts are seen through the puddles they step over, a man stretches and slides across the sidewalk through his circus-mirror reflection in a chrome wheel well. Paradoxically, the craftsmanship of Ivens's work shifts attention away from the director and his efforts and towards the "story" of the film and its main conflict—man's interaction with nature, and indeed Amsterdam's interaction with water, which holds the power to help and hurt the city.

Much emphasis is also placed on rhythmic movement. At times black umbrellas fill the scene which seem to ebb and flow like water themselves as the people beneath them move about a city square. Similarly, we are able to follow the timing of the storm by paying attention to shots where rain is falling into a canal—it is light, then heavy, then light once again. Part of what makes the timing of the film feel so true to the timing of a rainstorm actually experienced are the synergistic cuts tested and proved by the Soviet Montage movement. Kuleshov and Pudovkin proved that if an audience watches two shots in succession, they will automatically assume that those shots are related—so we imagine that as we watch a shot of rain steadily falling in the canal, then another of a man rushing to get his groceries indoors, he has picked up speed because he too has sensed that it has started to rain. In another scene, a woman steps on a trolley and the next shot is of the rain-slicked street passing below; we assume we are seeing the street from the woman's seat on the trolley.

== Historical context ==
As noted above, Regen can be placed in the context of the Weimar Era and its art, which are tied into the culture and subsequently the socioeconomic conditions of the time. Informing Ivens's piece primarily is the cultural revolution of Modernism, which exploded into and informed artistic movements such as German Expressionism, Dada, the avant-garde, and later, Neue Sachlichkeit (New Objectivity), the German movement that strove to portray the harsh realities of modern city life as they were. In spite of the influence of Modernism, Ivens leaves worship of the machine to Vertov and steers his film in the direction of a more romantic subject: nature. Though Regen can hardly be called pastoral, its artistic expression evokes a less frantic poetry than that of the city symphonies it is often compared with. It manages nonetheless to achieve the same defamiliarization—a revitalizing rendering of something that is familiar into something that is abstract or strange—as its Russian counterpart.

Reactions to Ivens's film vary over time, as scholars come to compare this work to the rest of Ivens's work very differently from the fellow Filmliga members who reacted to this singular art piece in the 1920s. Pudovkin may have started the trend of calling the film uncharacteristic for Ivens, as it lacked any of his spirituality. Films like Rain and The Bridge were beautiful, but they were only formal experiments, not reflective of Ivens's search for certainty in a chaotic world. One unlikely critic of the film is its co-director, who was displeased not by the content or aesthetics of the film, but by the fact that from its premiere he received very little credit for it. Though in his autobiography, Ivens claims to have conceived of Regen on his own while filming Breakers, in reality Mannus Franken wrote to Ivens with the idea in the fall of 1927. Franken wrote to another Filmliga member about not wishing to take credit from Ivens for making the film, but being annoyed all the same that he received very little credit for the work.
