= Impressionen vom alten Marseiller Hafen (Vieux Port) =

1929 film

Impresionen vom alten Marseiller Hafen (Vieux Port)
- Directed by: László Moholy-Nagy
- Release date: 4 March 1929 (Berlin)
- Running time: 10 mins 33 secs
- Country: Germany
- Language: Silent

Impresionen vom alten Marseiller Hafen (Vieux Port) is a short city symphony film by László Moholy-Nagy in 1929. It was one of the first films Moholy-Nagy created when venturing into the art of filmmaking. It premiered on March 4, 1932, in Berlin.

In 1933, Moholy-Nagy explains the process of the film's conception, stating he "had a limited amount of material (300 meters) and thought it useless to try to present such a huge city in so few meters of film. So I consciously chose a small section of this huge city, in particular a part that was unknown, because of its sad social conditions, its poverty, and its dangerous streets, the Vieux Port." Moholy-Nagy also described the film as "semi-social reportage."

The film embraces the presence of the Pont transbordeur. The steel bridge, constructed in 1905, was described by Moholy-Nagy as "truly a wonder of technical precision and beauty." The bridge is also documented in some of Moholy-Nagy's photography, one photo of which is preserved in the Metropolitan Museum of the Arts. The bridge has also been photographed by Man Ray, Herbert Bayer, Florence Henri, Germaine Krull, and Marcel Bovis.

In August 1944, the north tower of the bridge was damaged during the Battle of Marseilles. The bridge remained standing until its complete destruction by explosives on September 1, 1945.

== Synopsis ==
Impressionen vom alten Marseiller Hafen (Vieux Port) (1929)

The film has a runtime of approximately 10 minutes and 33 seconds. It opens with a shot of Moholy-Nagy's name spelled on a table in cut-out letters, followed by letters spelling zeigt ("shows"). Then, a black and white title card spells impressionen vom alten marseiller hafen (vieux port) in a shot lasting ten seconds.

The next sequence centers on a map of the city's coast, behind which emerges a pair of scissors cutting out the area labeled vieux port. Through the gap left by the cut-out part of the map, footage of a street are shown. The sequence lasts 42 seconds. The word Marseille is typed out on a typewriter.

Three shots in sequence view the street from above, through what is either a window pane or balcony railing. Two shots pan across the busy streets from above, noting passersby.

At street level, three shots observe passersby and street traffic. Two shots of children regarding a bear cub on the back of a cart bookend a shot of a young child smiling at the camera. A man with one leg uses crutches to walk. Three shots take place in front of the windows of a shop. An elderly woman sits by the pier.

A man smokes on a balcony, watching two young girls play in the square below. The sequence consists of five shots. Then, the elderly woman is shown again in two shots bookending a shot of workers by the water.

Numerous shots take place within or around a comfortable cafe. The sequence lasts 30 seconds.

Multiple shots from ground level and a higher vantage point showcase movement of vehicles, pedestrians, and bicycles on the streets.

The first shot of the Pont transbordeur appears in the distance of a street-level shot from an alleyway. 25 consecutive shots capture elements of the bridge or views from the high vantage point of the bridge. The sequence lasts 80 seconds.

The following sequence observes the water of the port as well as an individual man and two children sleeping on the docks.

A crowd of men is observed gathered in the street, with many shots taken from behind parked vehicles, or at a distance.

Three shots illustrate a mother at the beach with her young daughter, in a medium shot, then extreme wide shot, and then medium again. Subsequent shots follow women carrying babies in the city.

A spread of tools and knives is shown at the feet of primarily young, working-class men.

A young man waits impatiently in a car, bookended by shots of poor elderly people sitting along the streets. The following shots juxtapose images of isolated vagrants and waste piles, along one which a kitten attempts to navigate. A sequence following individuals conducting laborious tasks and children exploring the streets is intercut by a stray dog on the pavement.

A wide shot of a street incline cuts steadily backwards until the sequence observes the silhouettes of metalworkers, completely in shadow except for fiery sparks and the light of the doorway behind them.

Multiple shots showcase attempts at repairs to alleys and surrounding structures.

A gathering of elderly woman are observed, and one smiles at the camera. The outdoor of a closed cafe and people ascending a staircase appear thereafter. Then, the shots return to the docks, observing men playing a game while gathered on large stones at the waterside. It begins to rain. In the distance, through the rain and across the water, the bridge is observed in another wide shot.

A dog runs a circle in the street. The rain continues, some people with umbrellas and some standing at windows looking out; another shot of the bridge is intercut.

Children play in an alleyway, one empty and one crowded, as the rain and work continues in the following lengthy sequence of shots, culminating approximately 60 seconds.

A final shot of the bridge is bookended by shots of garbage being shoveled from a gutter; the image is then juxtaposed with a clear, empty, extreme long shot of the ocean. The final 20 seconds of the film are shots from a boat delivering Moholy-Nagy from the port.
