= Far from Vietnam =

1967 film

- Film poster
- Directed by: Joris Ivens; William Klein; Claude Lelouch; Agnès Varda; Jean-Luc Godard (segment); Chris Marker; Alain Resnais (segment)
- Written by: Jean-Luc Godard; Chris Marker; Jacques Sternberg
- Produced by: Chris Marker
- Starring: Anne Bellec; Karen Blanguernon; Bernard Fresson
- Cinematography: Jean Boffety; Denys Clerval; Ghislain Cloquet; Willy Kurant; Alain Levent; Kieu Tham; Bernard Zitzermann
- Edited by: Jacques Meppiel
- Distributed by: Sofradis
- Release date: 1 October 1967
- Running time: 115 minutes
- Country: France
- Language: French

Far from Vietnam (French: Loin du Vietnam) is a 1967 French documentary film directed by Joris Ivens, William Klein, Claude Lelouch, Agnès Varda, Jean-Luc Godard, Chris Marker and Alain Resnais.

== Cast ==
- Anne Bellec
- Karen Blanguernon
- Bernard Fresson as Claude Ridder
- Maurice Garrel
- Jean-Luc Godard as himself
- Ho Chi Minh as himself (archive footage)
- Valérie Mayoux
- Marie-France Mignal
- Fidel Castro as himself (uncredited)
