= 17th parallel =

17th parallel may refer to:

- 17th parallel north, a circle of latitude in the Northern Hemisphere
  - Vietnamese Demilitarized Zone, between North and South Vietnam (1954–76) at approximately the 17th parallel north
  - 17th Parallel: Vietnam in War, a 1968 documentary film
- 17th parallel south, a circle of latitude in the Southern Hemisphere
