= Lou Lichtveld =

Dutch-Surinamese writer and politician (1903–1996)

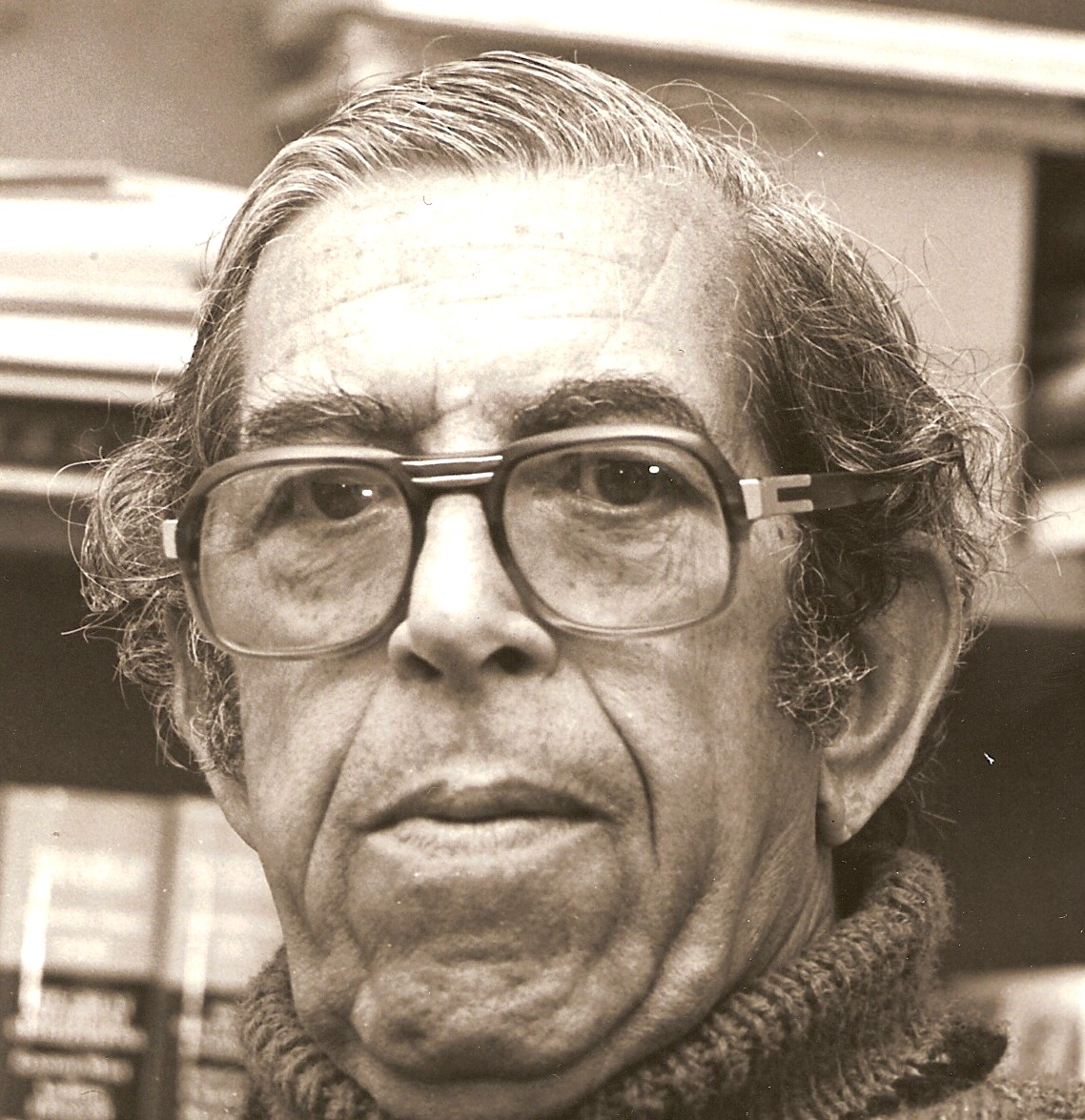
- Born: Lodewijk Alphonsus Maria Lichtveld; 7 November 1903; Paramaribo, Suriname
- Died: 10 July 1996 (aged 92); Amsterdam, Netherlands
- Other name: Albert Helman
- Occupations: Playwright, poet, organist, journalist, politician
- Political party: National Party of Suriname
- Children: Noni Lichtveld

Lodewijk 'Lou' Lichtveld (7 November 1903 – 10 July 1996) was a Surinamese politician, playwright, poet and resistance fighter who wrote under the pseudonym "Albert Helman".

He gained notability in 1923 when he published the poetry collection De glorende dag (The Dawning Day), a milestone in immigrant literature in the Netherlands. He followed it three years later with Zuid-Zuid-West (South-South-West).

In 1940, before the invasion of the Netherlands, he wrote the book Millioenen-leed ("Millions of Suffering") about the treatment of the Jews in Nazi Germany. During World War II, he was a member of the Grote Raad van de Illegaliteit ("Great Council of Illegality"),. After the war, he became part of the Emergency Parliament. In 1949, he returned to Suriname and became Minister of Education and later Minister of Health.

== Biography ==
Lou Lichtveld was born in Paramaribo, Suriname into an elite family. At the age of twelve, he went to the Netherlands to become a priest at boarding school Rolduc in Kerkrade. He completed this training after a short time and returned to Suriname. At the Paulus School in Paramaribo, he completed a music study. After that he worked as an organist and composer.

In 1922, he again went to the Netherlands to start a teacher training and to continue his music studies. After completing his studies, he worked as an organist in Amsterdam and later as a journalist.

His first work in book form appeared in 1923. It was a collection of poetry called De glorende dag ("The dawning day"), which was still published under the name Lodewijk Lichtveld. He used the pseudonym "Albert Helman" for the first time in 1926 on his debut novel Zuid-Zuid-West ("South-South-West"). This novel describes his memories of his country of birth and the exploitation of Suriname by the Dutch colonizer, and ended with a fierce anti-colonial epilogue. Many more novels, essays and poems followed.

He also worked as a playwright and as a translator of foreign literature into Dutch. His musical works were shown in the silent film Rain (1929) by Joris Ivens, which appeared in 1932 as a sound version with a score composed by Helman film music. In 1931, he published a play based on the third voyage of Willem Barentsz.

=== Spain ===
In 1932, Lichtveld moved to Spain. Here he fought on the side of the Republicans in the Spanish Civil War against the fascists under General Francisco Franco. For the papers NRC Handelsblad and De Groene Amsterdammer, he wrote articles about the civil war. After Franco's victory, Lichtveld fled to North Africa in 1938, from there to Mexico and finally returned to the Netherlands in 1939.

=== Resistance ===
In the Netherlands, he was mainly concerned with the fate of the Jews who had fled Germany. In 1940, he wrote on behalf of the Comité voor Bijzondere Joodse Belangen ("Committee for Special Jewish Interests") the book Millioenen-leed ("Millions of Suffering").

After the German invasion of the Netherlands in May 1940, Lichtveld went into hiding, because he could no longer appear in public as a known anti-fascist. In the resistance, he was active as a forger of personal documents and as a writer of resistance slogans. He also wrote for the illegal paper Vrije Kunstenaar ("Free Artist"). During the occupation, he wrote under the pseudonyms Joost van den Vondel, Friedrich W. Nietzsche, Hypertonides and Nico Slob. In addition, he became a member of the Grote Raad van de Illegaliteit ("Great Council of Illegality") whose mission it was to advice the Dutch government-in-exile in London.

After the war he was appointed as one of the members of the Emergency Parliament which was established to govern the Netherlands in preparation of free elections.

=== Public Offices ===
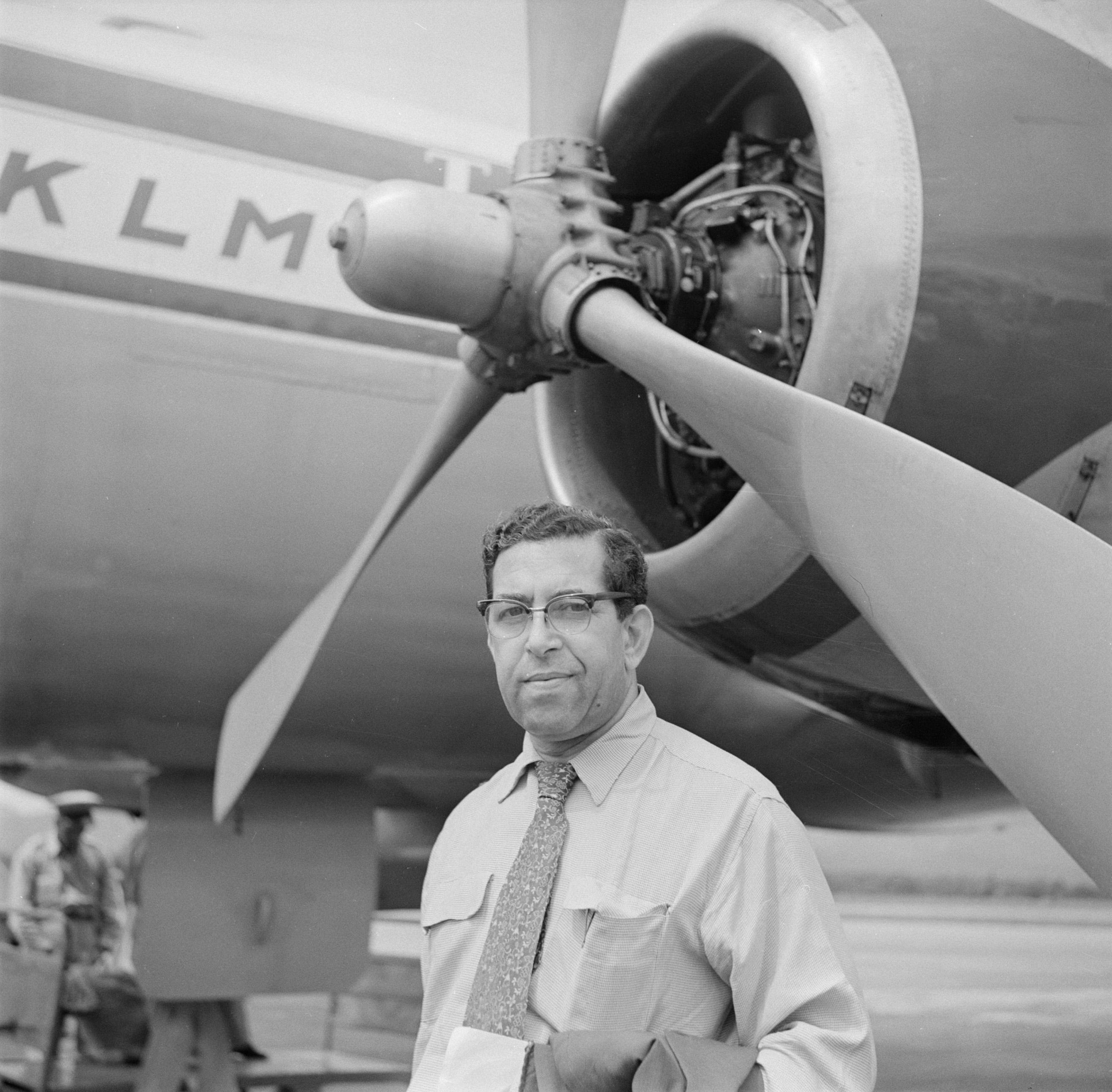
Lou Lichtveld in 1955

In 1949, Lichtveld returned to his native Suriname, where he was the Minister of Education and National Development and Minister of Health until 1951. The government fell over the Hospital Question in which Lichtveld had fired doctor Henk van Ommeren over alleged irregularities which were later proven false. After his resignation as Minister, he still held various other offices. He was chairman of the Court of Audit of Suriname and director of the office folk reading. In 1961, he was appointed to the Dutch Embassy in Washington, D.C. Here, he was part of the delegation of the Kingdom to the United Nations, which was specifically concerned with the perception of Surinamese interests.

After retiring, he settled on Tobago, later in Airole and finally in Amsterdam, where he died at the age of 92 years.
