= Marceline Loridan-Ivens =

French writer and director (1928–2018)

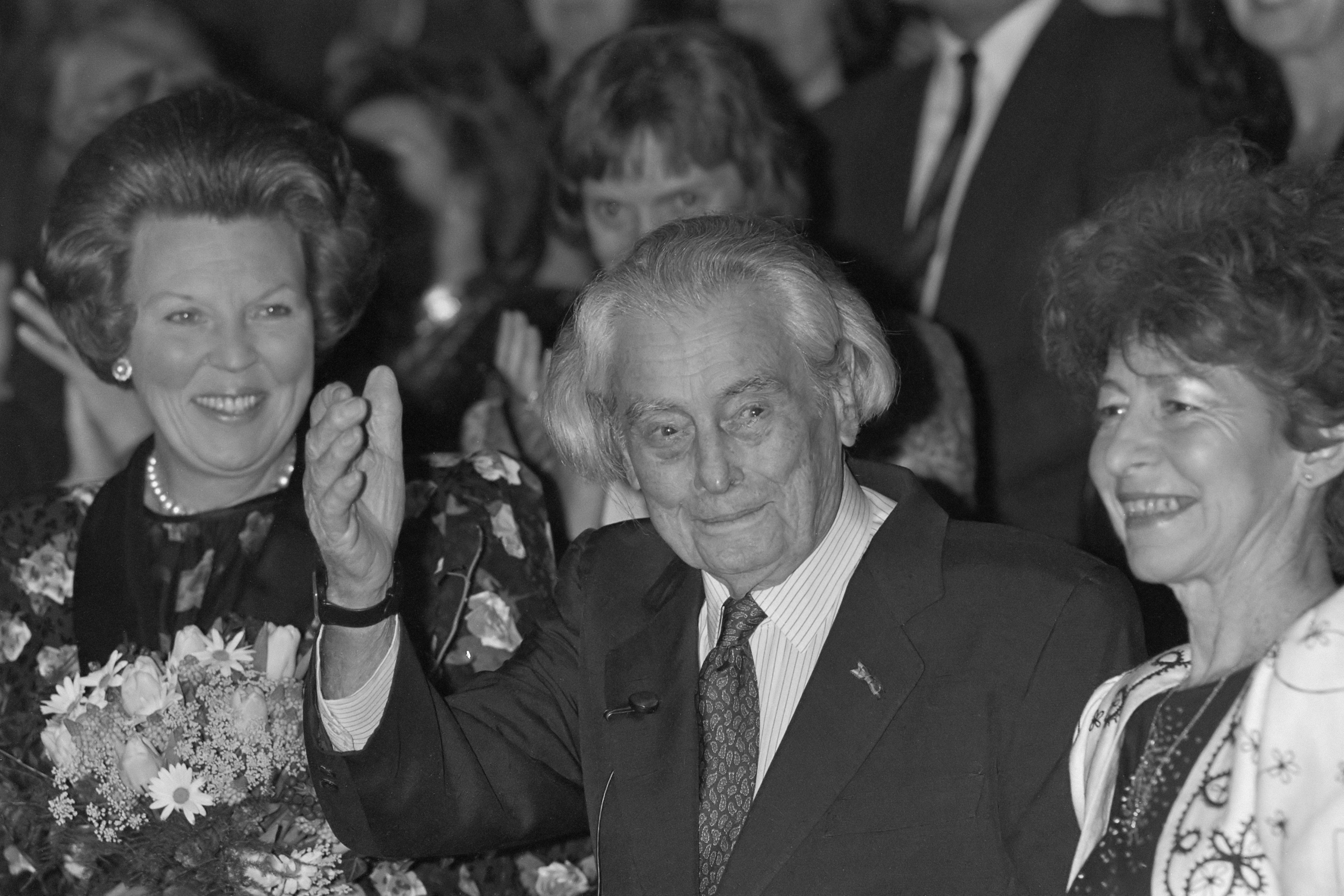
- Marceline Loridan-Ivens (right) and Joris Ivens with Queen Beatrix of the Netherlands
- Born: Marceline Rozenberg; 19 March 1928; Épinal, France
- Died: 18 September 2018 (aged 90); Paris, France
- Occupations: Writer and filmmaker
- Years active: 1962–2014
- Spouse: Joris Ivens

Marceline Loridan-Ivens (née Rozenberg; 19 March 1928 – 18 September 2018) was a French writer and film director. Her memoir But You Did Not Come Back (Et tu n'es pas revenu) details her time in Auschwitz-Birkenau. She was married to Dutch filmmaker Joris Ivens.

== Early life ==
Marceline Rozenberg was born on 19 March 1928 to Polish Jewish parents who emigrated to France in 1919.

At the beginning of World War II, her family settled in Vaucluse, where she joined the French Resistance. She and her father, Szlama, were captured by the Gestapo and deported to Auschwitz-Birkenau by Convoy 71 on 13 April 1944, along with Simone Veil and Anne-Lise Stern, then to Bergen-Belsen, and eventually to Theresienstadt. The camp was liberated on 10 May 1945 by the Red Army.

She met figures such as Henri Lefebvre and Edgar Morin, worked in the reprographic service of a polling institute, was bag carrier for the Algerian National Liberation Front, and frequented Saint-Germain-des-Prés.

== Career ==
In 1961, Edgar Morin cast her in the film Chronique d'un été, thus making her film debut. In 1963, she met and married the documentary director Joris Ivens. She assisted him in his work and co-directed some of his films, including 17th Parallel: Vietnam in War (1968). They left together for Vietnam, where they met Ho Chi Minh.

From 1972 to 1976, during the Cultural Revolution, Joris Ivens and Marceline Loridan worked in China and directed How Yukong Moved the Mountains, a series of 12 films Criticised by Jiang Qing, they had to quickly leave China.

The title of her 2003 film La petite prairie aux bouleaux (The little prairie of birches) is the literal translation of "Birkenau".

== Other activities ==
Loridan-Ivens gave lectures and testimonies in colleges and high schools on the Holocaust.

Loridan-Ivens' memoir But You Did Not Come Back (Et tu n'es pas revenu; published 2015), co-written with Judith Perrignon, details her time in Auschwitz-Birkenau.

== Personal life ==
She first married Francis Loridan, an engineer. Years later they divorced, but she was allowed to keep his surname.

She later married Dutch filmmaker Joris Ivens. They had no children, and Ivens died on 28 June 1989.

== Death and legacy ==
Loriden-Ivens died on 18 September 2018.

As of 2025 the Prix du premier film Loridan-Ivens (First Film Loridan-Ivens Award) is awarded each year at the Cinéma du Réel film festival. The Loridan-Ivens Award was initiated by Loridan-Ivens to support emerging committed filmmakers "casting a sharp eye on the state of the world". It is given in honour of her husband Joris Ivens, who was an early supporter Cinéma du Réel. The prize was formerly known as the Joris Ivens Prize for a Young Filmmaker, or just Joris Ivens Award.

== Awards ==
- 1977: César Award for Best Documentary Short Film for Une histoire de ballon, lycée n° 31 Pékin
- 2015: Lilac Academy Award
- 2015: Prix Jean-Jacques-Rousseau, a literary award, for Et tu n'es pas revenu
- 2016: National Jewish Book Award for But You Did Not Come Back: A Memoir

== Publications ==
- 17e parallèle : la guerre du peuple: deux mois sous la terre, cowritten with Joris Ivens, Paris, les Éditeurs français réunis, 1969 (44 illustrations)
- Ma vie balagan, co-written with journalist Élisabeth D. Inandiak, Robert Laffont, 2008 ISBN 978-2-221-10658-7
- Et tu n'es pas revenu, co-written with Judith Perrignon, Grasset, 2015 ISBN 978-2-246-85391-6
- L'amour après, story written with Judith Perrignon, Grasset, 2018, 162pp.

== Selected filmography ==
=== As director ===
- 1962: Algérie, année zéro – Documentary co-directed with Jean-Pierre Sergent
- 1968: 17th Parallel: Vietnam in War – Documentary co-directed with Joris Ivens
- 1976: How Yukong Moved the Mountains – Documentary series co-directed with Joris Ivens
- 1976: Une histoire de ballon, lycée n° 31 Pékin – Short film (19 min) co-directed with Joris Ivens
- 1977: Les Kazaks – Documentary co-directed with Joris Ivens
- 1977: Les Ouigours – Documentary co-directed with Joris Ivens
- 1988: A Tale of the Wind – Documentary-fiction co-directed with Joris Ivens
- 2003: La petite prairie aux bouleaux

=== As actress ===
- 1961: Chronique d'un été
- 1999: Peut-être
- 2008: Une belle croisière
- 2008: Les Bureaux de dieu
- 2013: Bright Days Ahead

=== Screenwriter ===
- 2003: La Petite Prairie aux bouleaux
