= How Yukong Moved the Mountains =

1976 film

- Directed by: Joris Ivens; Marceline Loridan
- Release date: 10 March 1976 (Paris)
- Running time: 763 minutes
- Country: France
- Language: French

How Yukong Moved the Mountains (French: Comment Yukong déplaça les montagnes) is a series of 12 documentary films directed by Marceline Loridan-Ivens and Joris Ivens about the Cultural Revolution. Ivens and his partner Loridan worked on the film between 1972 and 1974, and it was finally released in France in 1976. The film's title refers to Yugong Yishan, an ancient fable about the virtues of perseverance and willpower. At 763 minutes, it is one of the longest theatrical films by running time.

== Contents ==
For English-language distribution, the film was shown in five feature-length parts:

1. A Woman, A Family; Rehearsal at the Peking Opera (Note: Alternate translation: A Performance at the Peking Opera)
2. The Fishing Village; The Football Incident; (Note: Alternate translation: The Ball) Training at the Peking Circus
3. The Pharmacy; Traditional Handicrafts; (Note: Alternate translation: Craftsmen) An Army Camp (Note: Alternate translation: A Barracks)
4. The Generator Factory; Professor Tsien
5. The Oilfields; (Note: Alternate translation: Petroleum) Impressions of a City - Shanghai

== Reception ==
The segment The Football Incident was awarded Best Documentary Short at the 1977 César Awards.

== See also ==
- List of longest films
