= Bolesław Matuszewski =

Polish movie director and photographer

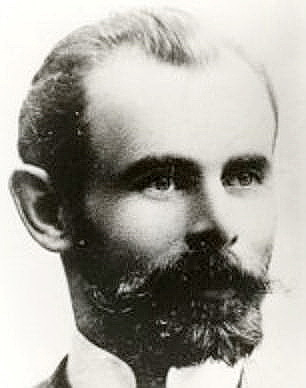
Bolesław Matuszewski

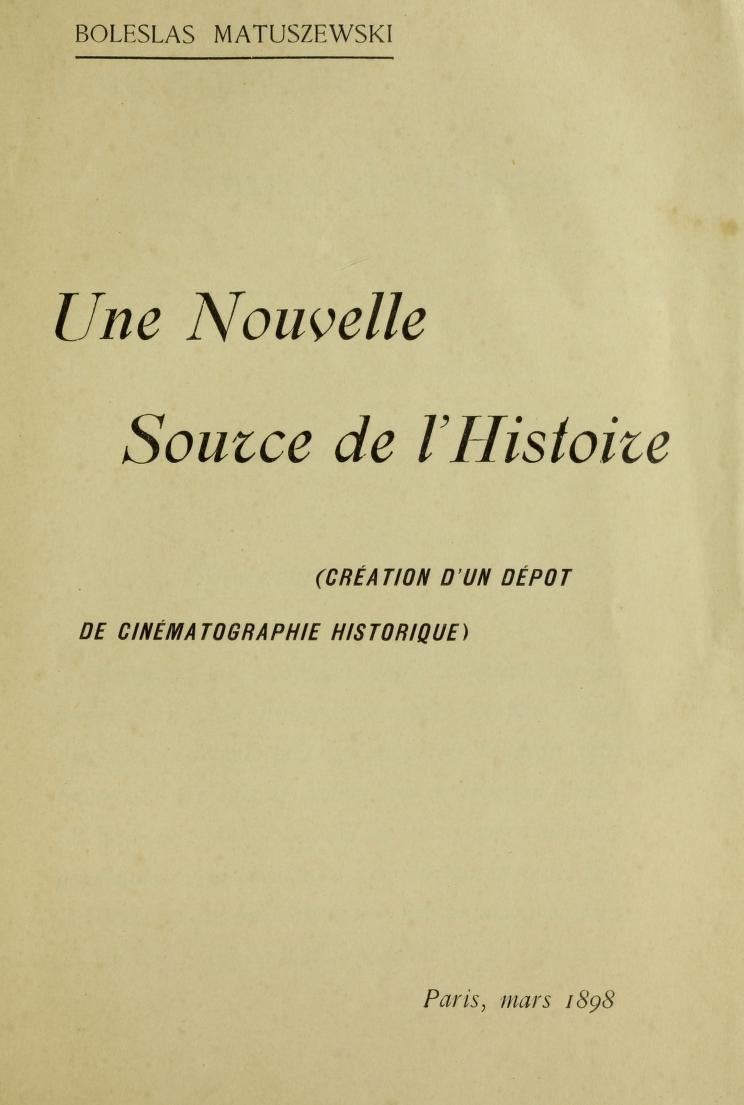
The cover of Matuszewski's 1898 book Une nouvelle source de l'histoire. (A New Source of History), the first publication about documentary function of cinematography.

Bolesław Matuszewski (August 19, 1856 Pińczów, – c.1943 or 1944; in French texts Boleslas Matuszewski) - Polish businessman, photographer and cameraman, pioneer of cinematography and documentary film.

== Biography ==
He was born in 1856 in Pińczów, the small Congress Poland city, which after partitions of Poland became part of the Russian Empire. His father Aleksander was translator of French language and his mother was Stanisława Pochowska. Bolesław Matuszewski had also two sisters and a younger brother Zygmunt.

His father taught him French language on advanced level and Matuszewski in 80. of XIX lived in Paris where he studied. In that time he was interested in photography and film. He became an employee of the Lumière company and was active photographer and cinematographer, member of photographic society "LUX".

In 1895 he came back to Poland with his younger brother Zygmunt. Both they opened a photographic atelier at Marszałkowska Street 111 in Warsaw. Soon atelier became company Lux Sigismond et Comp. Matuszewski's firm between 1897 and 1899 cooperated with Polish weekly magazine „Tygodnik Illustrowany”. The company was active to 1908 and produced many documentary films and photographs.

In 1897, after assuming the position of photographer to Tsar Nicholas II, he used the Lumières' Cinématographe to record the official visit to St. Petersburg, of the French President Félix Faure. After the visit, Otto von Bismarck accused Faure of not baring his head before the Russian flag on his disembarkation. However, this accusation was shown to be false based on Matuszewski's documentary.

== Publications ==
Matuszewski wrote two of the earliest texts on cinema. They are recognized today as the first film manifestos and the first written work to consider the historical and documentary value of film. Matuszewski is also the first filmmaker who appreciated the historical importance of film and proposed the creation of film archives for collecting and safekeeping of visual materials:

- Une nouvelle source de l'histoire (eng. A New Source of History)(Paris, 1898),
- La photographie animée (eng. Animated photography)(1898).
- Les portraits sur emaux vitrifies (1901).
