= Joris Ivens =

Dutch documentary filmmaker (1898–1989)

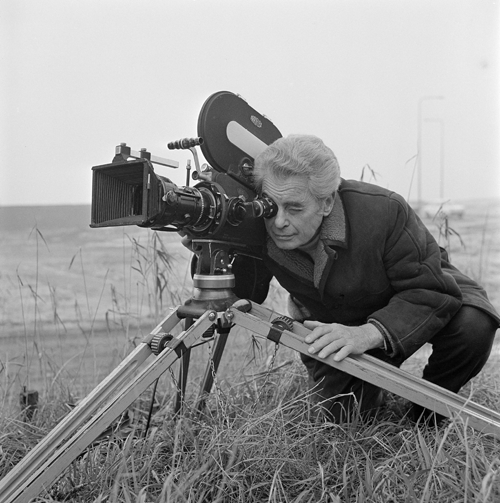
- Joris Ivens, circa 1971
- Born: Georg Henri Anton Ivens; 18 November 1898; Nijmegen, Netherlands
- Died: 28 June 1989 (aged 90); Paris, France
- Occupation: Documentary filmmaker
- Spouse: Marceline Loridan-Ivens

Georg Henri Anton "Joris" Ivens (18 November 1898 – 28 June 1989) was a Dutch documentary filmmaker. Among the notable films he directed or co-directed are A Tale of the Wind, The Spanish Earth, Rain, ...A Valparaiso, Misère au Borinage (Borinage), 17th Parallel: Vietnam in War, The Seine Meets Paris, Far from Vietnam, Pour le Mistral and How Yukong Moved the Mountains.

== Early life and education ==
Born Georg Henri Anton Ivens on 18 November 1898 at Nijmegen, Netherlands, into a wealthy family, Ivens went to work in one of his father's photo supply shops and from there developed an interest in film. Under the direction of his father, he completed his first film at the age of 13: a silent short titled Wigwam (Shining Ray).

He studied first at the Rotterdam School of Economics (1916–17, 1920–21), before serving as a field artillery lieutenant in World War I. In 1922 and 1923 he studied photochemistry in Germany.

Returning to Amsterdam in 1926, he joined the family business, but left around 1929 after his first two films were met with acclaim.

== Career ==
=== Early work ===
Originally his work was constructivist in character, especially his short city symphonies Rain (Regen, 1929), which he directed together with Mannus Franken, filmed over two years, and The Bridge (De Brug, 1928). The latter was about a newly built elevator railway bridge in Rotterdam, shot in 1927, and shown in 1928 by the Nederlandsche Filmliga (Netherlands Film League) (1927–1933). This avant-garde cineclub, with its eponymous magazine, had just been established by Ivens, Menno ter Braak, and others, with branches in different Dutch cities. The Bridge was part of its first season of film screenings, and received critical acclaim. The Filmliga drew various foreign filmmakers to the Netherlands, such as Alberto Cavalcanti, René Clair, Sergei Eisenstein, Vsevolod Pudovkin, and Dziga Vertov, who also became Ivens' friends. Through these connections, The Bridge was widely shown abroad, including the Soviet Union.

In 1929, Ivens went to the Soviet Union after being invited to present a lecture there, and due to the success of The Bridge, he was invited to direct a film on a topic of his own choosing, which was the new industrial city of Magnitogorsk. Before commencing work, he returned to the Netherlands to make Industrial Symphony for Philips Electric, which is considered to be a film of great technical beauty.

He returned to the Soviet Union to make the film about Magnitogorsk, Song of Heroes in 1931 with music composed by Hanns Eisler. This was the first film on which Ivens and Eisler worked together. It was a propaganda film about this new industrial city where masses of laborers and Communist youth worked for Stalin's Five Year Plan.

With Henri Storck, Ivens made Misère au Borinage (Borinage, 1933), a documentary on life in a coal mining region. In 1943, he also directed two Allied propaganda films for the National Film Board of Canada, including Action Stations, about the Royal Canadian Navy's escorting of convoys in the Battle of the Atlantic.

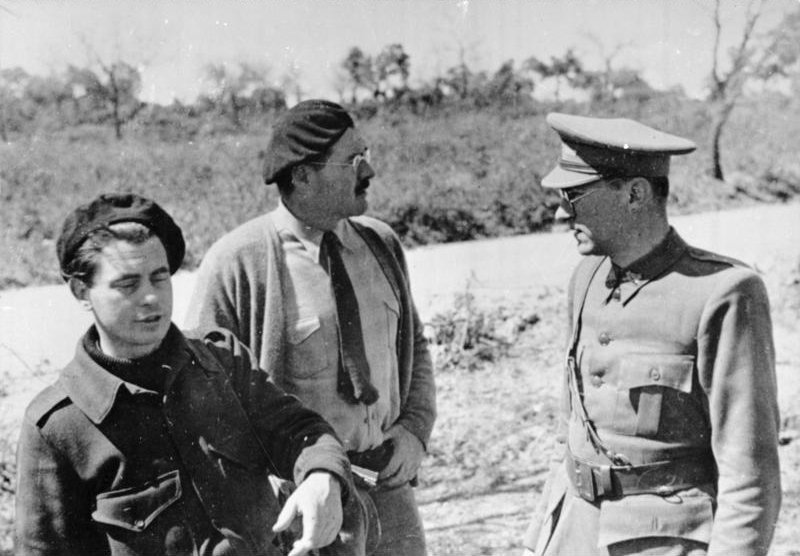
Joris Ivens (left) with Ernest Hemingway (middle) and Ludwig Renn in the Spanish Civil War, 1936

Ivens met Ernest Hemingway and Ludwig Renn during the Spanish Civil War.

=== U.S. and World War II ===
From 1936 to 1945, Ivens was based in the United States. For Pare Lorentz's U.S. Film Service, in the year 1940, he made the documentary film Power and the Land, on rural electrification and Franklin Roosevelt's electrification program. It focuses on a family, the Parkinsons, who run a business providing milk for their community. The film highlights the differences in their lifestyle before and after the advent of electricity.

Ivens was, however, better known for his anti-fascist and other propaganda films, including the feature-length documentary The Spanish Earth (1937). This film was made for the Spanish Republican cause, co-written with Hemingway, with music by Marc Blitzstein and Virgil Thomson. Jean Renoir did the French narration for the film and Hemingway did the English version (after Orson Welles' version had sounded too theatrical). This film was financed by Archibald MacLeish, Fredric March, Florence Eldridge, Lillian Hellman, Luise Rainer, Dudley Nichols, Franchot Tone, and other Hollywood movie stars, moguls, and writers who composed a group known as the Contemporary Historians. The Spanish Earth was shown at the White House on 8 July 1937 after Ivens, Hemingway, and Martha Gellhorn had had dinner with President Franklin D. Roosevelt, Eleanor Roosevelt, and Harry Hopkins. According to Hemingway, the Roosevelts were "very moved" by the film, but said that "we should put more propaganda in it". The film showed how the Republicans tried to hold on to freedoms which were threatened by the Falangists, and their attempts to reclaim farmland which had been neglected for decades by absentee landlords. Ivens produced the film for less than $10,000. This documentary was considered his masterpiece.

In 1938 he traveled to China. The 400 Million (1939) depicted the history of modern China and the Chinese resistance during the Second Sino-Japanese War, including dramatic shots of the Battle of Taierzhuang. Robert Capa did camerawork, Sidney Lumet worked on the film as a reader, Hanns Eisler wrote the musical score, and Fredric March provided the narration. It had been financed by the same people who had supported Spanish Earth. Its chief fundraiser was Luise Rainer, recipient of the best actress Oscar two years in a row; and the entire group called themselves this time, History Today, Inc . The Kuomintang government censored the film, fearing that it would give too much credit to left-wing forces. Ivens was also suspected of being a friend of Mao Zedong and especially Zhou Enlai.

In early 1943, Frank Capra hired Ivens to supervise the production of Know Your Enemy: Japan for his U.S. War Department film series Why We Fight. The film's commentary was written largely by Carl Foreman. The script by Foreman and Ivens highlighted a militarist-capitalist clique who "want to rule the world," with the emperor as their puppet. Capra fired Ivens from the project because he felt that his approach was too sympathetic toward the Japanese position. The film's release was held up because there were concerns that emperor Hirohito was being depicted as a war criminal, and there was a new plan to protect the image of the emperor as a means of maintaining order in post-war Japan.

With the emerging "Red Scare" of the late 1940s, Ivens was forced to leave the country in the early months of the Truman administration. Ivens's leftist politics also put a stop to his first feature film project, which was to have starred Greta Garbo. Walter Wanger, the film's producer, was adamant about "running [Ivens] out of town."

=== Return to Europe ===
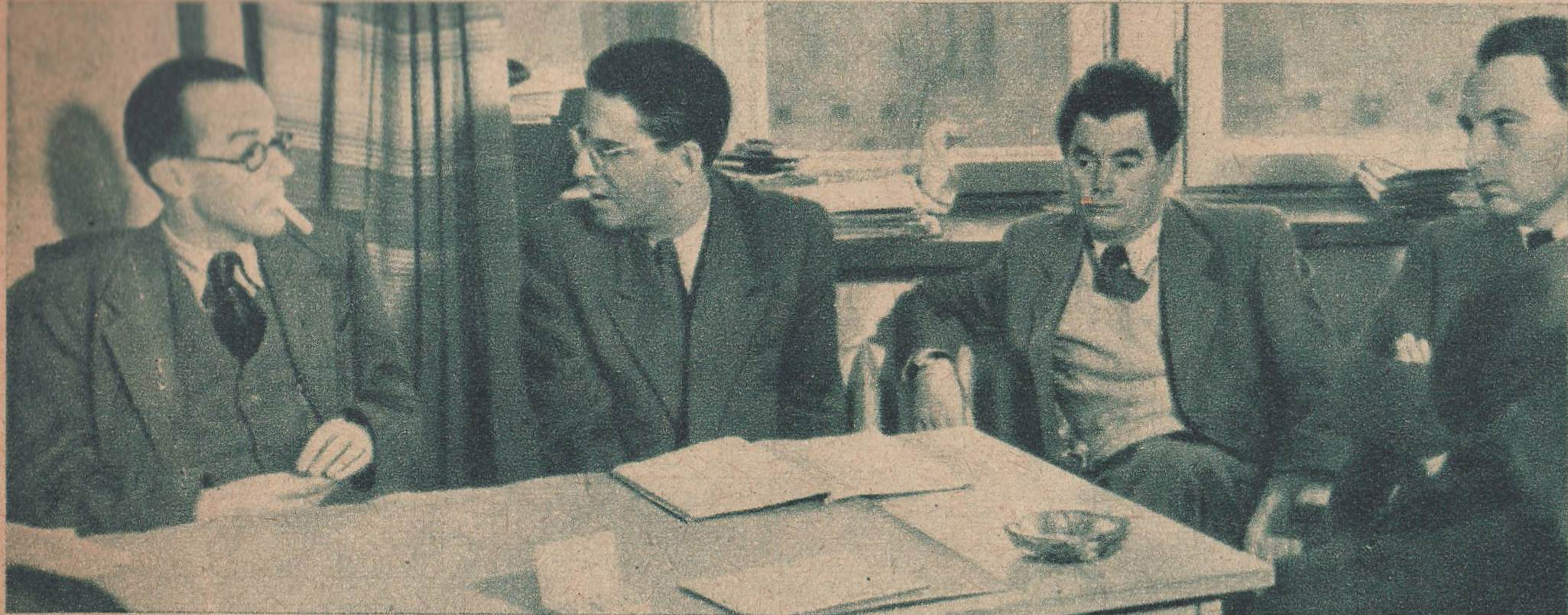
Conference of World Union of Documentary Films in Warsaw (1948): Basil Wright (left), Elmar Klos, Joris Ivens (2nd from right) and Jerzy Toeplitz

In 1946, commissioned to make a Dutch film about Indonesian independence, Ivens resigned in protest over what he considered ongoing imperialism; the Dutch were in his view resisting decolonization. Instead, Ivens filmed Indonesia Calling in secret, for which he received funding from the International Workers Order.

For around a decade Ivens lived in Eastern Europe, working for several studios in Czechoslovakia, Poland and East Germany.

Having been criticized in the Netherlands, the tides were turning in the 1960s. In 1965, the city of Rotterdam commissioned him to make a film about the port, which was meant to be a promotional film, but Ivens got carte blanche. The result, the essay-film Rotterdam Europoort (1966), is not only critical of modern city planning and consumerism, but also an autobiographical tale inspired by the legend of the Flying Dutchman. Ivens was very happy with the result and even believed that it was his best film.

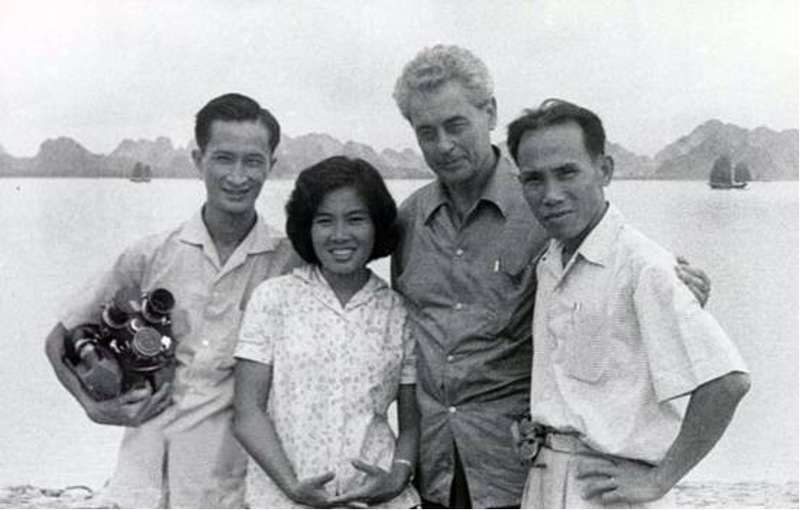
Xuân Phượng, Joris Ivens and the filming crew of "17th Parallel Vietnam in War".

Ivens worked on two documentary films about North Vietnam during the war; he made 17e parallèle: La guerre du peuple (17th Parallel: Vietnam in War) in 1968. Xuân Phượng was assigned as the interpreter and host to him and his wife while they directed the film about the effect of bombing on Vietnam. Phượng said that she remembered a comment by Ivens where he hoped that she would make a good life. This led her to turn away from her career path which was heading to be a deputy minister. She decided instead to become a war correspondent and in time a TV director.

He later participated in the collective work Loin du Vietnam (Far from Vietnam).

From 1971 to 1977, he shot How Yukong Moved the Mountains, a 763-minute documentary about the Cultural Revolution in China.

Shortly before his death in 1989, Ivens released the last of more than 40 films: Une histoire de vent (A Tale of the Wind).

== Recognition and awards ==
Ivens was awarded the Lenin Peace Prize for the year 1967.

In 1988 he received the Golden Lion Honorary Award at the Venice Film Festival.

He received a knighthood in the Order of the Netherlands Lion in January 1989.

== Personal life ==
Ivens met photographer Germaine Krull in Berlin in 1923, and entered into a marriage of convenience with her between 1927 and 1943 so that Krull could hold a Dutch passport and could have a "veneer of married respectability without sacrificing her autonomy."

Ivens later married French filmmaker and writer Marceline Loridan. They had no children.

== Death and legacy ==
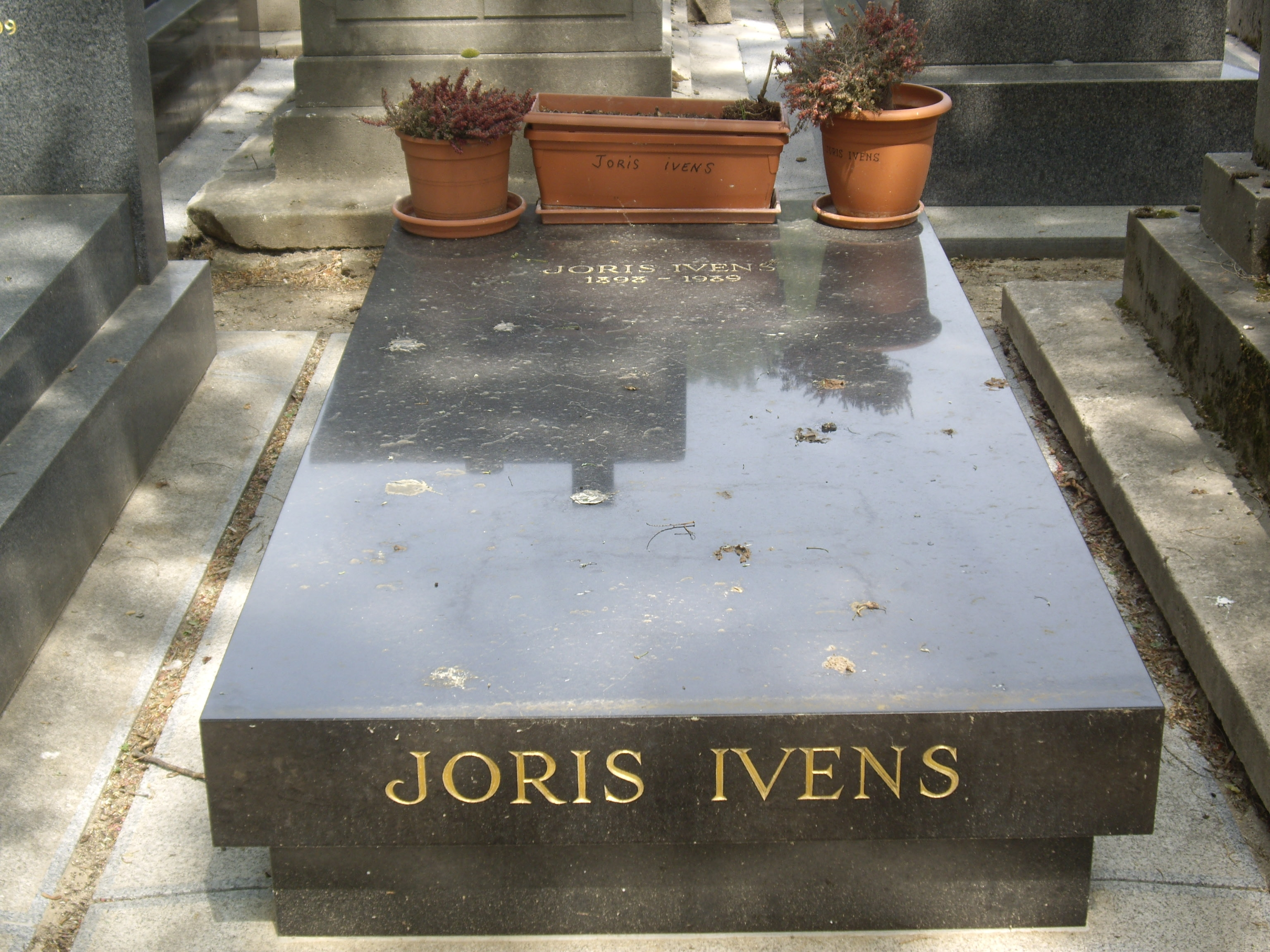
Ivens' tomb at Cimetière du Montparnasse, Paris

On 7 June 1989 Ivens spoke to Radio Netherlands about his life and work in a wide-ranging interview.

He died on 28 June 1989. He was buried at the Cimetière du Montparnasse in Paris.

The Joris Ivens Award was awarded at the International Documentary Film Festival Amsterdam from 1988, before being renamed the IDFA Award for Best Feature-Length Documentary between 2006 and 2009. It was presented annually until 2020, when the category was split.

As of 2025 the Prix du premier film Loridan-Ivens (First Film Loridan-Ivens Award) is awarded each year at the Cinéma du Réel film festival. The Loridan-Ivens Award was initiated by Loridan-Ivens to support emerging committed filmmakers "casting a sharp eye on the state of the world". It is given in honour of her husband Joris Ivens, who was an early supporter Cinéma du Réel. The prize was formerly known as the Joris Ivens Prize for a Young Filmmaker, or just Joris Ivens Award.

A statue of Ivens by sculptor Bryan McCormack was erected in Parc de Saint-Cloud in Paris in 2010.

The Joris Ivens European Foundation (Europese Stichting Joris Ivens) includes an archive of Ivens' work, as well as other features relating to him.

== Filmography ==
- The Flaming Arrow (1912)
- O, Sunland (1922)
- The Sunhouse (1925)
- Film Sketchbook (1927)
- The Sick Town (1927)
- Instruction Films Micro Camera, University Leiden (1927)
- Movement Studies in Paris (1927)
- Filmstudy Zeedijk (1927)
- The Street (1927)
- Ice Skating (1927)
- The Bridge (1928)
- Rain (1929)
- Breakers (1929)
- Poor Drenthe (The Misery in the Peat-mores of Drenthe) (1929)
- Pile Diving (1929)
- Zonneland (1930)
- We are building (1930)
- Second Union Film (1930)
- Zuiderzee (1930)
- Tribune Film (1930)
- Concrete Construction (1930)
- Donogoo-Tonka (1931)
- Philips Radio (1931)
- Creosote (1932)
- Komsomol, (Song of Heroes, Youth Speaks) (1932)
- New Earth (1933)
- Borinage (1934)
- The Spanish Earth (1937)
- The 400 Million (1938)
- New Frontiers (1940)
- Power and the Land (1940)
- Our Russian Front (1942)
- Action Stations (1943)
- Corvette Port Arthur (1943)
- Know Your Enemy: Japan (1945) (uncredited)
- Indonesia Calling (1946)
- The First Years (1948)
- Friendship Triumphs (1952)
- Peace Tour 1952 (1952)
- Chagall (article in Italian) (1952-1960)
- The Song of the Rivers (1954)
- My Child (1956)
- The Windrose / Rose of the Winds (1957)
- The war of the 600 Million People (1958)
- Letters from China (1958)
- L'Italia non è un paese povero (article in Italian) (1960)
- Demain à Nanguila (1960)
- Carnet de viaje (1961)
- Pueblo en armas (1961)
- Le petit chapiteau (1963)
- Le train de la victoire (1964)
- ...A Valparaiso (article in French) (1965)
- Le mistral (1965)
- Rotterdam Europoort (1966)
- Le ciel - La terre (1967)
- Far from Vietnam (1967)
- Une histoire de ballon (1967)
- 17th Parallel: Vietnam in War (1968)
- Le people et ses fusills (1970)
- How Yukong Moved the Mountains (1976)
- Les ouigours (1977)
- Les Kazaks (1977)
- The Drugstore (1980)
- A Tale of the Wind (1988)
