= 17th Parallel: Vietnam in War =

1968 French documentary film by Joris Ivens

- Film poster
- Directed by: Joris Ivens; Marceline Loridan-Ivens
- Cinematography: Joris Ivens
- Release date: 26 September 1968
- Running time: 113 minutes
- Country: France
- Language: French

17th Parallel: Vietnam in War (French: Le 17e parallèle: La guerre du peuple) is a 1968 French documentary film directed by Marceline Loridan-Ivens and Joris Ivens. The film sets out to show the effects of the American bombing campaign on the Vietnamese people, who were mainly peasant farmers.

== Synopsis ==
In 1968, between South Vietnam under the control of the US Army and North Vietnam struggling for independence, a demilitarized zone was created around the 17th parallel. Joris Ivens and his wife, Marceline Loridan, went to this area around the village of Vinh Linh for two months to live among the peasants who had taken refuge in cellars in an attempt to survive the incessant bombing of the American artillery.

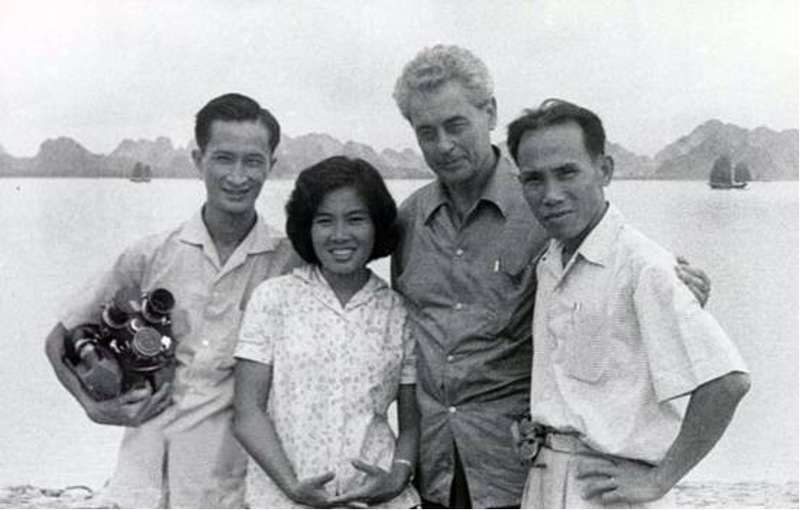
Xuân Phượng, Joris Ivens and the filming crew of "17th Parallel Vietnam in War".

Xuân Phượng was assigned as the interpreter and host to Marceline Loridan and Joris Ivens.
