= Germaine Krull =

German photographer (1897–1985)

- Born: November 29, 1897; Poznań (German Empire)
- Died: July 31, 1985 (aged 87)
- Occupation: Photographer
- Spouse(s): Joris Ivens
- Partner(s): Eli Lotar

Germaine Luise Krull (20 November 1897 – 31 July 1985) was a photographer, political activist, and hotel owner. Her nationality has been categorized as German, French, and Dutch, but she spent years in Brazil, Republic of the Congo, Thailand, and India. Described as "an especially outspoken example" of a group of early 20th-century female photographers who "could lead lives free from convention", she is best known for photographically illustrated books such as her 1928 portfolio Métal.

== Biography ==
Krull was born in Posen-Wilda, a district of Posen (then in Germany; now Poznań, Poland), of an affluent German family. In her early years, the family moved around Europe frequently; she did not receive a formal education, but instead received homeschooling from her father, an accomplished engineer and a free thinker (whom some characterized as a "ne'er-do-well"). Her father let her dress as a boy when she was young, which may have contributed to her ideas about women's roles later in her life. In addition, her father's views on social justice "seem to have predisposed her to involvement with radical politics."

Between 1915 and 1917 or 1918 she attended the Lehr- und Versuchsanstalt für Photographie, a photography school in Munich, Germany, at which Frank Eugene's teaching of pictorialism in 1907–1913 had been influential. She opened a studio in Munich in approximately 1918, took portraits of Kurt Eisner and others, and befriended prominent people such as Rainer Maria Rilke, Friedrich Pollock, and Max Horkheimer.

Krull was politically active between 1918 and 1921. In 1919 she switched from the Independent Socialist Party of Bavaria to the Communist Party of Germany, and was arrested and imprisoned for assisting a Bolshevik emissary's attempted escape to Austria. She was expelled from Bavaria in 1920 for her Communist activities, and traveled to Russia with lover Samuel Levit. After Levit abandoned her in 1921, Krull was imprisoned as an "anti-Bolshevik" and expelled from Russia.

She lived in Berlin between 1922 and 1925 where she resumed her photographic career. She and Kurt Hübschmann (later to be known as Kurt Hutton) worked together in a Berlin studio between 1922 and 1924. Among other photographs Krull produced in Berlin were a series of nudes included in a 2000 retrospective of her work at the San Francisco Museum of Modern Art. Although San Francisco Chronicle art critic Kenneth Baker generally praised her work, he considered the nudes to be "almost like satires of lesbian pornography".

Having met Dutch filmmaker and communist Joris Ivens in 1923, she moved to Amsterdam in 1925. After Krull returned to Paris in 1926, Ivens and Krull entered into a marriage of convenience between 1927 and 1943 so that Krull could hold a Dutch passport and could have a "veneer of married respectability without sacrificing her autonomy."

In Paris between 1926 and 1928, Krull became friends with Sonia Delaunay, Robert Delaunay, Eli Lotar, André Malraux, Colette, Jean Cocteau, André Gide and others; her commercial work consisted of fashion photography, nudes, and portraits. During this period she published the portfolio Métal (1928) which concerned "the essentially masculine subject of the industrial landscape." Krull shot the portfolio's 64 black-and-white photographs in Paris, Marseille, and Holland during approximately the same period as Ivens was creating his film De Brug ("The Bridge") in Rotterdam, and the two artists may have influenced each other. The portfolio's subjects range from bridges, buildings (e.g., the Eiffel Tower), and ships to bicycle wheels; it can be read as either a celebration of machines or a criticism of them. Many of the photographs were taken from dramatic angles, and overall the work has been compared to that of László Moholy-Nagy and Alexander Rodchenko. In 1999–2004 the portfolio was selected as one of the most important photobooks in history.

By 1928 Krull was considered one of the best photographers in Paris, along with André Kertész and Man Ray. Between 1928 and 1933, her photographic work consisted primarily of photojournalism, such as her photographs for Vu, a French magazine. In the early 1930s, she made a pioneering study of employment black spots in Britain for Weekly Illustrated (most of her ground-breaking reportage work from this period remains immured in press archives; according to Ian Jeffrey, she has never received the credit which is her due for this work). Her book Études de Nu ("Studies of Nudes") published in 1930 is still well-known today. Between 1930 and 1935 she contributed photographs for a number of travel and detective fiction books.

In 1935–1940, Krull lived in Monte Carlo where she had a photographic studio. Among her subjects during this period were buildings (such as casinos and palaces), automobiles, celebrities, and common people. She may have been a member of the Black Star photojournalism agency which had been founded in 1935, but "no trace of her work appears in the press with that label."

In World War II, she became disenchanted with the Vichy France government, and sought to join the Free French Forces in Africa. Due to her Dutch passport and her need to obtain proper visas, her journey to Africa included over a year (1941–1942) in Brazil where she photographed the city of Ouro Preto. Between 1942 and 1944 she was in Brazzaville in French Equatorial Africa, after which she spent several months in Algiers and then returned to France.

After World War II, she traveled to Southeast Asia as a war correspondent, but by 1946 had become a co-owner of the Oriental Hotel in Bangkok, Thailand, a role that she undertook until 1966. She published three books with photographs during this period, and also collaborated with Malraux on a project concerning the sculpture and architecture of Southeast Asia.

After retiring from the hotel business in 1966, she briefly lived near Paris, then moved to Northern India and converted to the Sakya school of Tibetan Buddhism. Her final major photographic project was the publication of a 1968 book Tibetans in India that included a portrait of the Dalai Lama. After a stroke, she moved to a nursing home in Wetzlar, Germany, where she died in 1985.

Krull's work was included in the 2021 exhibition Women in Abstraction at the Centre Pompidou.

== Selected works ==
- Krull's archives are kept at the Museum Folkwang in Essen, Germany.
- Detroit Public Library Digital Collection houses a portrait of singer Adelaide Hall by Germaine Krull dated 1929, photographed during Blackbirds residency at the Moulin Rouge, Paris.

=== Books ===
- Krull, Germaine. Métal. Paris: Librairie des arts décoratifs, 1928. (New facsimile edition published in 2003 by Ann and Jürgen Wilde, Köln.)
- Krull, Germaine. 100 x Paris. Berlin-Westend: Verlag der Reihe, 1929.
- Bucovich, Mario von. Paris. New York: Random House, 1930. (With photographs by Krull.)
- Colette. La Chatte. Paris: B. Grasset, 1930. (With photographs by Krull.)
- Krull, Germaine. Études de Nu. Paris: Librairie des Arts Décoratifs, 1930.
- Nerval, Gérard de, and Germaine Krull. Le Valois. Paris: Firmin-Didot, 1930.
- Warnod, André. Visages de Paris. Paris: Firmin-Didot, 1930. (With photographs by Krull.)
- Krull, Germaine, and Claude Farrère. La Route Paris-Biarritz. Paris: Jacques Haumont, 1931.
- Morand, Paul, and Germaine Krull. Route de Paris à la Méditerranée. Paris: Firmin-Didot, 1931.
- Simenon, Georges, and Germaine Krull. La Folle d'Itteville. Paris: Jacques Haumont, 1931.
- Krull, Germaine, and André Suarès. Marseille. Paris: Librairie Plon, 1935.
- Krull, Germaine, Raúl Lino, and Ruy Ribeiro Couto. Uma Cidade Antiga do Brasil, Ouro Preto. Lisboa: Edições Atlântico, 1943.
- Vailland, Roger. La Bataille d'Alsace (Novembre-Décembre 1944). Paris: Jacques Haumont, 1945. (With photographs by Krull.)
- Krull, Germaine. Chiengmai. Bangkok: Assumption Printing Press, 1950–1959?
- Krull, Germaine, and Dorothea Melchers. Bangkok: Siam's City of Angels. London: R. Hale, 1964.
- Krull, Germaine, and Dorothea Melchers. Tales from Siam. London: R. Hale, 1966.
- Krull, Germaine. Tibetans in India. Bombay: Allied Publishers, 1968.
- Krull, Germaine. La Vita Conduce la Danza. Firenze: Filippo Giunti, 1992. ISBN 88-09-20219-8. (Autobiography of Krull in French, La vie mène la danse or "Life Leads the Dance", translated into Italian by Giovanna Chiti.)
- Krull, Germaine. La vie mène la danse. Paris : Textuel editions, 2015. ISBN 978-2-84597-522-4.
- Frizot, Michel. Germaine Krull. Paris : Hazan editions, 2015. ISBN 978-2-7541-0816-4. (Catalog of the exhibition "Germaine Krull (1897-1985), Jeu de Paume museum, Paris 2015).

=== Films ===
- Six pour Dix Francs (France, 1930)
- Il Partit pour un Long Voyage (France, 1932)
