= City symphony =

Film genre encompassing documentary, experimental and the avant-garde

A Bronx Morning by Jay Leyda, a 1931 short film documenting the Bronx

City symphony is a film genre encompassing documentary, experimental, and the avant-garde that emerged in the 1920s. Coming to prominence alongside modernist art movements such as futurism, constructivism, and radicalism, city symphonies reflect the historical development of city centers and technological hubs of advancement. As the art of cinema became more respected, filmmakers such as Walter Ruttman and Dziga Vertov gravitated towards works highlighting the beauty of cities, aiming to capture scenes of modern life from their narrative points of views.

== Emergence ==
The term "city symphony" suggests a musically inclined editing pace and harmonious imagery to support the visual images. Many city symphony filmmakers shot their films with an artistically inclined eye, aiming to show urban hubs with aestheticism and beauty rather than as a travel log. Cities across the world such as Manhattan, Berlin, and Milan were filmed in admiration with positive images of their hardworking people and impressive industrial feats. Rather than have characters, dialogue, or narrative, the city itself was the star of these films.

City symphony films made during the 1920s-1930s were before the era of sound cinema, however images were also supported by musical accompaniments.

City symphonies, which continued well into the post-WWII era, are usually associated with the rise in art film as well as contemporaneous trends in art and photography movements like modernism. New York City predominates as the subject, from the imposing architecture of Manhattan to the depiction of social life on the streets of boroughs such as Spanish Harlem.

== Notable works ==
Partial list of short and feature-length films, documentary, experimental and some fictional dramas that were referenced as city symphonies:

| Year | Film title | Director | Cities | Min. | Notes | Ref. |
|---|---|---|---|---|---|---|
| 1922 | Manhatta | Paul Strand, Charles Sheeler | New York, Manhattan (US) | 10 | silent experimental short film showcasing the vast infrastructure and ingenuity of New York City. | |
| 1926 | Rien que les heures | Alberto Cavalcanti | Paris (F) | 45 | silent short (45 min) with intertitles, course of a day | |
| 1927 | Berlin: Symphony of a Great City | Walter Ruttmann | Berlin (G) | 65 | silent documentary, edited rhythmically capturing the vitality of 24 hours in 1920s Berlin. | |
| 1929 | Man with a Movie Camera | Dziga Vertov | Moscow, Kyiv and Odesa (SU) | 68 | experimental short film depicting urban life in various Soviet cities through innovative cinematic techniques. | |
| 1929 | Rain | Joris Ivens, Mannus Franken | Amsterdam (Nl) | 12 | short with music | |
| 1929 | Skyscraper Symphony | Robert Florey | New York (Manhattan) | 9 | silent, almost exclusively looking up the facades of New York skyscrapers with all sorts of camera movement | |
| 1930 | A propos de Nice | Jean Vigo | Nice (F) | 25 | silent short, take on the city's visible social inequalities. | |
| 1931 | A Bronx Morning | Jay Leyda | New York, Bronx | 11 | silent, the New York borough coming alive in steady shots, some panning, many detail frames, some abstraction | |
| 1934 | Rhapsody in Two Languages | Gordon Sparling | Montreal (Ca) | 10 | short accompanied by a musical score and sparse narration | |
| 1939 | The City | Ralph Steiner and Willard Van Dyke | New York and Pittsburgh | 45 | beginning in rural New England, moving to Pittsburgh, New York and New Jersey | |
| 1948 | In the Street | Helen Levitt, Janice Loeb, James Agee | New York, Spanish Harlem | 14/18 | silent, taken with hidden 16 mm camera, edited by Levitt (adding music as well) | |
| 1948 | WeeGee’s New York | Weegee (Arthur Felig) | New York | 28 | 16 mm short, leads "across the Brooklyn Bridge down to Coney Island and all around the rest of the city with characteristic gusto and verve" | |
| 1952 | Abstract in Concrete | John Arvonio | New York, Manhattan | 10 | color, "reflections of neon signs in the rain puddles of Times Square with a jazz/classical score by Frank Fields", funded by the USIA | |
| 1953 | Daybreak Express | D.A. Pennebaker | New York | 5 | color, music by Duke Ellington, "Daybreak Express", a tribute to the eponymous train, camera moves with it, few shots of passengers, seconds of (kaleidoscopic) abstraction at the end | |
| 1954 | Jazz of Lights | Ian Hugo | New York, Manhattan | 52 | 16 mm, color[?], "dizzying verticality of Manhattan is articulated and abstracted" | |
| 1955 | The Wonder Ring | Stan Brakhage | New York | 6 | 16 mm | |
| 1956 | Together | Lorenza Mazzetti, Denis Horne | London, East End (UK) | 52 | featurette with personnel and music | |
| 1957 | N.Y., N.Y. | Francis Thompson | New York | 15 | experimental short, "A Day in New York" recorded through special lenses, prisms and mirrors | |
| 1958 | Bridges-Go-Round | Shirley Clarke | New York Harbor | 4 | color, 16 mm negative, color partly enhanced in the development process ("bi-packing"), music by Teo Macero | |
| 1958 | Broadway by Light | William Klein | New York, Manhattan, Broadway | 12 | color, neon lights and marquee lettering at night, men working on them, begins with multiple exposures, in part pure color abstraction, images and orchestral score fit exactly, with introductory text by Chris Marker | |
| 1964 | Go, Go, Go | Marie Menken | New York | 12 | | |
| 1966 | Castro Street | Bruce Baillie | Richmond (California, US) | 10 | | |
| 1967 | Crowds | David Devensky | New York | 38 | color, 16 mm | |
| 1967 | The Burning of New York | Michael Jacobson | New York | 8 | color, 16 mm short, "hand-painted and starched-upon", concerned with the urban pollution | |
| 1967 | 2 or 3 Things I Know About Her | Jean-Luc Godard | Paris | 87 | fictional drama, feature film | |
| 1972 | Scenes from New York City Transit | Robert Crawford | New York | 17 | color (final third), 16 mm | |
| 1977 | Taxi, Taxi | Bill Creston | New York | 14 | color, 16 mm | |
| 1975 | Organism | Hilary Harris | New York, Manhattan | 20 | the city seen as a living organism, uses time-lapse photography, synthesizer soundtrack | |
| 1977 | News from Home | Chantal Akerman | New York | 88 | feature-length documentary consisting of long takes with voice-over citation | |
| 1979 | Manhattan | Woody Allen | New York, Manhattan | | fictional drama, black-and-white feature film | |
| 1981 | Stations of the Elevated | Manfred Kirchheimer | New York | 45 | color, early documentation of graffiti in the city, music by Charles Mingus | |
| 1982 | Concern for the City | Peter von Ziegesar | New York | 30 | color, 16 mm | |
| 1983 | Koyaanisqatsi | Godfrey Reggio | US | 86 | feature film critical of the state of American civilization, using time-lapse photography, slow motion, stock photography a. o. commamded by the driving minimal music soundtrack by Philip Glass | |
| 1983 | N.Y.C. (No York City) | Rick Liss | New York | 6 | color, music by Laurie Anderson "with a pulsating electronic beat that keeps the film's vigorous tempo" | |
| 1986 | Dream City | Steven Siegel | New York | 27 | color, 16 mm, "political realities of inequity flood the sound and image tracks" | |
| 1989 | Water and Power | Pat O'Neill | Los Angeles (US) | 57 | documents the impact of the city's enormous water consumption on the environment | |
| 1997 | Derail | Catalina Santamaria | New York | 7 | color | |
| 2017 | London Symphony | Alex Barrett | London | | | |
| 2018 | New York Gradual | Gregg Biermann | New York | 14 | color, 16 mm | |

== See also ==
- Modernist film
- The Great Depression
- Minimalist film

== Bibliography ==
- Dähne, Chris (2013). Die Stadtsinfonien der 1920er Jahre. Architektur zwischen Film, Fotografie und Literatur (Kultur- und Medientheorie). Bielefeld: Transcript. Abstract and Introduction (in German).
- Gartenberg, Jon (2014). "NY, NY: A Century of City Symphony Films". Framework. The Journal of Cinema and Media. 55 (2): 248–276. doi:10.13110/framework.55.2.0248. JSTOR 10.13110/framework.55.2.0248.
- Jacobs, Steven, Eva Hielscher, Anthony Kinik [eds.] (2021). The City Symphony Phenomenon: Cinema, Art, and Urban Modernity Between the Wars (AFI Film Readers). New York: Routledge. doi:10.4324/9781315619989 (restricted access, searchable, with abstract and table of contents)
- Webb, Michael (1987). "The City in Film". Design Quarterly (136): 1–32. doi:10.2307/4091166. JSTOR 4091166.
