= Rien que les heures =

1926 film

- Opening title
- Directed by: Alberto Cavalcanti
- Starring: Philippe Hériat; Blanche Bernis; Nina Chousvalowa; Clifford McLaglen
- Release date: 1926
- Running time: 45 min.
- Country: France
- Languages: Silent film French intertitles

Rien que les heures (English: Nothing But Time or Nothing But the Hours) is a 1926 silent city symphony film by Brazilian director Alberto Cavalcanti showing the life of Paris through one day in 45 minutes.

Other noted examples of the city symphony genre include Charles Sheeler and Paul Strand's Manhatta (1921), Walter Ruttmann's Berlin: Symphony of a Metropolis (1927), Andre Sauvage's Etudes sur Paris (1928), and Dziga Vertov's Man With a Movie Camera (1929).

== See also ==
- List of French films of 1926
