= De brug =

1928 film

- Directed by: Joris Ivens
- Cinematography: Joris Ivens
- Edited by: Joris Ivens
- Release date: 1928
- Running time: 15 minutes
- Country: Netherlands

De brug (The bridge) is a 1928 Dutch documentary silent short film directed by Joris Ivens. This silent film explores the then-newly constructed Koningshaven Bridge in Rotterdam, an elevator railway bridge. The film looks at its structure, mechanisms, complex actions, and the steam-powered trains and ships crossing it.

== Synopsis ==
Three views of the film camera appear "as if in a technical drawing. It then proceeds to examine the bridge from all angles." The bridge is shown in ultrawide format, then wide, then in close-up, from a train rider's viewpoint. The view shifts to outside the train looking down at the harbor water far below, then to clouds of steam obscuring and revealing the bridge's steel structure. A worker ascends, inspects, observes the surrounding environs, and descends the superstructure. From a vantage point between two train cars coupled together, the countryside flits by as the train makes its way to the bridge. The bridgemaster at the control console commands the raising of the central section, and the massive alignment grooves, pulleys, cables, and counterweights are all detailed in their steady synchronized operation until the bridge's maximum height of 38 meters is reached. Sailing and steam ships then make their way under the raised bridge, while the steam train waits, puffing. The bridge descends, the counterweights rise, and the train continues on its way.

== History ==
In 1927, Joris Ivens, along with writer Menno ter Braak and others, established the avant-garde film association Nederlandsche Filmliga (1927-1933). While Ivens managed his father's photographic business, he was able to inspect film prints. His "first enthusiasm was the abstract films sent to them — sometimes brought to them — from Germany by new film directors Ruttmann, Eggeling, Richter, and others," and The Bridge, one of Ivens' first ventures into filmmaking, followed in a similar vein. This enthusiasm, and the interest to make a film about a railway bridge, was also informed by Germaine Krull, whom Ivens had met during his studies in Berlin, and married in 1927, while she was working on her photographic portfolio Métal. With Rotterdam being a modern, technology-oriented city, the construction of the bridge was also extensively covered in the press, while it inspired various artists too.

The Filmliga had established branches in different Dutch cities, and many architects were among their members. One of them was Sybold van Ravesteyn, architect at the Dutch Railways, who enabled Ivens to make his film. Ivens called the bridge "a laboratory of movements, tones, shapes, contrasts, rhythms, and the relations between all of these." He climbed the bridge over a period of months and filmed it "day after day" on lunch breaks, searching for "expressive angles." Germaine Krull also made photographs of Ivens during the production, which Van Ravesteyn made into a collage for the cover of the Filmliga magazine (1928/11).

Ivens' "almost entirely abstract" film achieved immediate international fame. De Brug was described in the British journal CLOSEUP (1928) as a "pure visual symphony." Many film critics, historians and theorists would write about this film in later years
