= North Sea (1938 film) =

- Directed by: Harry Watt
- Written by: Harry Watt
- Produced by: Alberto Cavalcanti; John Grier
- Starring: Bill Blewitt
- Cinematography: H. Fowle; Jonah Jones
- Edited by: Richard McNaughton
- Music by: Ernst Hermann Meyer
- Production company: GPO Film Unit
- Release date: 1938
- Running time: 33 minutes
- Country: United Kingdom
- Language: English

North Sea is a 1938 documentary film produced by Alberto Cavalcanti under the auspices of the GPO Film Unit and directed by Harry Watt. The film makers challenged the conventions of documentary, casting non-professionals, as they had in their previous film The Saving of Bill Blewitt. In the same style, North Sea employed minimal narration and relies on action, dialogue and characterisation to tell its story.

== Synopsis ==
The John Gillman, a deep-sea castle-class trawler is damaged during a storm in the North Sea and seeks help from the Wick coastguard. Eventually, after a struggle against the elements, the dangers are overcome, and the ship returns safely to harbour. The film was based on an incident in 1937 when an Aberdeen trawler got into distress and was saved through their radio distress calls.

== Critique ==
The portrayal of real fishermen and their lifestyle is the film's strength. The men are able to speak out and act themselves, rather than have their lives interpreted by professional middle-class actors. Nevertheless, the 'cast' did use some scripted dialogue devised by Watt, who, like many from the Documentary Film Movement, came from a middle-class background. As a consequence, dialogue and characterisation often appears inauthentic and unconvincing.

== Influence ==
North Sea was the GPO Unit's second dramatised documentary, following from The Saving of Bill Blewitt. It provided a second role for the real-life Bill Blewitt, the Cornish postman who had proved a star turn in the first film. North Sea proved popular and was to lead to a number of feature-length dramatised documentaries during the 1940s, including Target for Tonight, Coastal Command, Fires Were Started, and Western Approaches. Cavalcanti and Watt went on to work within the feature film industry.

== Cast ==
- Bill Blewitt
