= Yellow Caesar =

- Directed by: Alberto Cavalcanti
- Written by: Adrian Brunel (dialogue); Frank Owen (uncredited); Michael Foot (uncredited)
- Cinematography: John Taylor
- Edited by: Charles Crichton
- Music by: Walter Leigh
- Production company: Ealing Studios
- Release date: 1941
- Running time: 24 minutes
- Country: United Kingdom
- Language: English

Yellow Caesar is a 1941 British short comic propaganda film directed by Alberto Cavalcanti. It was written by Michael Foot and Frank Owen (as Michael Frank) and was produced by Ealing Studios and Michael Balcon.

== Synopsis ==
Yellow Caesar is billed as an "assessment" of the life and rise to power of the self-styled Il Duce, Italian dictator Benito Mussolini. Writing for the BFI's Screenonline website, Mark Duguid comments that the 24 minute short "is an unusually direct piece of agit-prop and probably the most striking of the 30-odd propaganda shorts released by Ealing Studios during WWII." The film traces Mussolini's years as a trade unionist thug and his role as a fascist demagogue.

== Cast ==
- Frank Owen as narrator
- Douglas Byng as English sympathiser
- Marcel King as Mussolini (voice)
- Sam Lee as Mussolini (voice)
- Lito Masconas as radio announcer
- Max Spiro as Mussolini (voice)
- Feliks Topolski as cartoonist
- Jack Warrock as Mussolini (voice)

== Reception ==
The Monthly Film Bulletin described the film as: "A biographical burlesque of Mussolini."

Winifred Horrobin wrote in Tribune, "Yellow Caesar, made two years ago by Calvacanti from newsreel material, with a commentary written by Frank Owen and Michael Foot, and spoken by Frank Owen, is vivid and appropriate to present occasions. It is a welcome reminder of the history and growth of Mussolini's gangster activities, and the crawling attitudes of Italy's priesthood and royalty, activities we can never forget nor forgive. The Italian people are shown giving their lives to "build up the House of Pain," the house that is now tumbling about their ears. Yellow Caesar might well have a new epilogue, underlining again some of the main points in the Duce's career of crime and the part played by the big industrialists, but even as it is, it has great value and topical interest."

In The Spectator, Edgar Anstey wrote: "Yellow Caesar makes a generally ingenious use of old and new tricks of picture and sound to reveal the Mussolini of the news-reels as a ridiculous buffoon. In places the technique is brilliant, yet at the end one wonders if it were worth all this labour to bait a defeated bullfrog."

Variety wrote: "Mussolini life story with derisive commentary."

Whilst generally well received by British audiences, there were doubts about the film's reception in neutral Eire, where censors had previously refused to pass Charlie Chaplin's The Great Dictator.

== Home media ==
The film is included as an extra on StudioCanal's 2011 DVD of Cavalcanti's Went the Day Well?.
