= Song of the Sea (disambiguation) =

Song of the Sea is a poem that appears in the Book of Exodus.

Song of the Sea can also refer to:

== Film ==
- Song of the Sea (1952 film), a 1952 Brazilian film
- Songs of the Sea (1970 film), a 1970 Romanian film
- Song of the Sea (2014 film), a 2014 Irish animated film

== Other uses ==
- Song of the Sea, a Hittite text which may be part of the Kumarbi Cycle
- Song of the Sea, an unproduced 1992 Disney animated film
- Song of the Sea, a 1996 novel by Jean Ferris, the second installment in the American Dreams series

== See also ==
- Songs of the Sea, a multimedia show located at Siloso Beach on Sentosa Island, Singapore
- Songs of the Sea (Stanford), a classical song cycle by Charles Villiers Stanford, premiered in 1904
