= Britain at Bay =

1940 British film by Harry Watt

- Title frame
- Directed by: Harry Watt
- Written by: J. B. Priestley
- Narrated by: J. B. Priestley
- Cinematography: James E. Rogers (credited as James Rogers); Allen White
- Music by: Richard Addinsell
- Production company: GPO Film Unit
- Distributed by: General Post Office Unit, Ministry of Information (United Kingdom); National Film Board of Canada (Canada)
- Release date: July 1940
- Running time: 6 minutes, 47 seconds
- Country: United Kingdom
- Language: English

Britain at Bay (aka Britain on Guard in other countries) is a 1940 British propaganda film directed by Harry Watt and produced by the General Post Office GPO Film Unit of the British Ministry of Information and distributed by the National Film Board of Canada. The film was written and narrated by noted author and political commentator J. B. Priestley. (Note: "By the summer of 1940 ... Priestley succeeded in becoming the voice of the people.")

== Synopsis ==
In 1940, a peaceful and democratic Great Britain stood in vast contrast to the evil of Nazi Germany, whose territorial ambitions have resulted in the invasions of Czechoslovakia, Poland, Norway and Belgium. France was the next to fall, leaving Britain, seemingly alone and "at bay" with only the English Channel holding back German forces.

Although facing great odds, Britain has withstood the threat of invasion before when Napoleon had also taken over a large expanse of Europe and had his armies poised to attack. Volunteers in the Local Defence Volunteers or "Home Guard", workers in war factories and other essential jobs, as well as others who sign up for military service in the army, navy and air force, prepare for war. The determination and resolve of all the inhabitants of the British Isles help turn Britain into an "impregnable citadel of free people."

From Australia, New Zealand and Canada, other forces are being mobilized to come to Britain's aid. Winston Churchill defiantly proclaims, "We shall fight on the beaches, we shall fight on the landing grounds, we shall fight in the fields and in the streets, we shall fight in the hills ..."

== Cast ==
- Winston Churchill as himself

== Production ==
Britain at Bay was produced with the purpose of raising morale. The film is an example of compilation documentary. Various newsreel extracts were assembled into a coherent whole, accompanied by a commentary. This form of documentary was used for other British wartime propaganda films, such as Words for Battle (1941). Author and social commentator J. B. Priestley wrote and narrated the film with the intended message that Britain is responsible for "... the future of the civilised world ..." and faces a "dark" evil.

The film opens with images of rural and urban Britain, including iconic images of Big Ben and the White Cliffs of Dover, then depicts the rise of Nazi Germany through newsreel footage, including the recent fall of France. British civilians are seen contributing towards the war effort and scenes of Allied troops are juxtaposed with an extract from Winston Churchill's "We Shall Fight on the Beaches" speech.

== Reception ==
Britain at Bay was released in British theatres during the Battle of Britain and later, under its original title, in 1941 as part of the Canada Carries On series of the National Film Board of Canada (NFB). Each film in the series was shown over a six-month period as part of the shorts or newsreel segments in approximately 800 theatres across Canada.

The NFB had an arrangement with Famous Players theatres to ensure that Canadians from coast-to-coast could see the Canada Carries On documentary series, with further distribution by Columbia Pictures. After the six-month theatrical tour ended, individual films were made available on 16 mm to schools, libraries, churches and factories, extending the life of these films for another year or two. They were also made available to film libraries operated by university and provincial authorities.

In recent times, Britain at Bay was praised for its timeless production values. One film reviewer noted "... it juxtaposes instantly resounding landscape images: green and pleasant, dark and smoky. Big Ben is defiant even when filmed behind barbed wire, and Dover's white cliffs are not yet clichéd. Shots of sea and sky complement narrator J.B. Priestley's invocation of a national history so old it brushes eternity." It was included in the British Film Institute (BFI) DVD compilation Land of Promise: The British Documentary Movement 1930-1950 (2008).

Britain at Bay also was released in Panamint's series of propaganda shorts, Britain At War (2005) by the GPO/Crown Film Unit, the second volume was subtitled Under Fire. Film reviewer Anthony Nield described it as offering "... a more sentimental approach ..." than other, more heavy-handed, propaganda films of the era.
