= Christmas Under Fire =

1941 British film by Harry Watt

- Directed by: Harry Watt
- Written by: Quentin Reynolds
- Produced by: Charles Hasse
- Narrated by: Quentin Reynolds
- Cinematography: Eric Cross; H.E. Fowle
- Production company: Crown Film Unit
- Release date: 1941
- Running time: 10 minutes
- Country: United Kingdom
- Language: English

Christmas Under Fire is a 1941 British short documentary film directed by Harry Watt for the Crown Film Unit of the Ministry of Information. It was conceived as propaganda primarily for an American audience, to raise support for the Allied cause during the Second World War. Produced in the context of German bombings of British cities, it depicts the resilience of British civilians despite the hardships they suffered during the 1940 Christmas, by showing the continuation of Christmas traditions in the face of the disruptions caused by war. The film is a sequel to London Can Take It!, with the same narrator, Quentin Reynolds. It was nominated for an Academy Award for Best Documentary Short, which was won by Churchill's Island.

== Synopsis ==
The film shows Christmas 1940, in the middle of the Blitz. Christmas traditions are depicted in juxtaposition with a wartime backdrop: Christmas trees are dug up for air raid shelters; housewives buy food for the Christmas dinner; theatres stage pantomime productions; schoolchildren produce handmade Christmas cards. People are shown celebrating Christmas while sheltering in the London Underground, accompanied by a carol sung by the choir of King's College, Cambridge.

== Production ==
Christmas Under Fire

Christmas Under Fire was produced by the Crown Film Unit of the Ministry of Information, commissioned as a sequel to London Can Take It. It was designed primarily for distribution in America and, in order to increase the film's appeal to an American audience, Quentin Reynolds from the magazine Collier's Weekly was chosen as the film's narrator; Reynolds had previously written and narrated two other British propaganda films, London Can Take It and London's Reply to Germany's False Claims.

The film was produced in the context of The Blitz, the series of German bombing raids on British cities that began in September 1940. A central message of the film is that "life goes on", with Christmas traditions continuing despite disruption caused by bombing. In order to encourage the support of the American population, the film was designed to shake the complacency of neutral America, while depicting the resilience, determination and defiance of British civilians. One window cleaner, for example, is shown putting up a poster stating: "Business As Usual: if you've got no windows, we'll clean your chimneys".

== Release and reception ==
As well as being released in Britain, the film was distributed in America by Warner Brothers, whose income from distributing the film was donated to the Spitfire Fund, which was used to help RAF construction of Spitfire aircraft.

Christmas Under Fire was nominated for an Academy Award for Best Documentary Short, losing to the Stuart Legg film Churchill's Island, another work about the wartime defence of Britain.

=== DVD release ===
The film is included on volume 3 of the British Film Institute GPO Film Unit DVD collection, If War Should Come.

A super 8 release also exists.

== See also ==
- List of Christmas films
