= The Saving of Bill Blewitt =

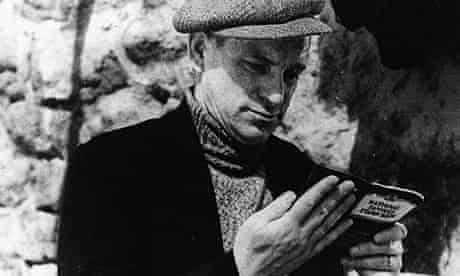
- Still from the film
- Directed by: Harry Watt
- Produced by: Alberto Cavalcanti; John Grierson
- Starring: Bill Blewitt
- Music by: Benjamin Britten
- Production company: GPO Film Unit
- Release date: 25 January 1936
- Running time: 26 minutes
- Country: United Kingdom
- Language: English

The Saving of Bill Blewitt is a 1936 documentary film produced by Alberto Cavalcanti of the GPO Film Unit and directed by Harry Watt.

== Synopsis ==
Intended as a celebration of the 75th anniversary of the Post Office Savings Bank, Watt's film eschewed conventional narration in favour of improvising a story around the villagers of Mousehole and the Cornish landscape they inhabit. The film's power of conviction owed much to the real-life Bill Blewitt, the village postmaster. Others recall him as having "a mesmeric gift of the gab, a glorious Cornish accent, twinkling blue eyes, a grin as broad as 'Popeye' and the charismatic charm of the Celt."

Set during the economic slump of the 1930s, the film follows two fishermen who have lost their boat but manage to save enough to buy another with the help of the Post Office Savings Bank. The inter-village squabbles and references to unemployment reflected the actual hardships of the Cornish fishing villages, whose pilchard industry had been suffered from Britain's refusal to trade with Mussolini's Italy.

The film was shown around the whole of Britain, often at church halls and other meeting rooms and was generally well received. On its showing in the village of Mousehole itself, the Post Office Magazine reported that the film caused such excitement amongst villagers that much of the dialogue could not be heard above the chatter. At the end of a showing in nearby Penzance Bill Blewitt and his wife, who also appeared, stepped onto the stage to be greeted by deafening cheers and hand clapping.

== Cast ==
- Bill Blewitt
- Villagers of Mousehole

== Critique ==
Against this hardship, the film's promotion of saving with the Post Office occupies a rather ambiguous place. The administrators of the post office savings account are unreal and over-earnest comic figures. Their intrusions into what is an otherwise realistic story have a dream-like quality at odds with the film's otherwise gently comic flow.

== Influence ==
Acclaimed by film maker Paul Rotha as the first 'story' documentary, The Saving of Bill Blewitt influenced populist Ealing comedies such as Whisky Galore! and the films of Mike Leigh. The real-life Bill Blewitt went on to appear in several other story-documentaries and wartime propaganda films as The Foreman Went to France and Harry's Watt's Nine Men.
