= Squadron 992 =

- Title frame
- Directed by: Harry Watt
- Written by: W.D.H. McCullough
- Produced by: Alberto Cavalcanti (credited as Cavalcanti)
- Narrated by: Lionel Gamlin
- Cinematography: Jonah Jones
- Edited by: R.Q. McNaughton
- Music by: Walter Leigh; Muir Mathieson (Conductor)
- Production company: GPO Film Unit
- Distributed by: General Post Office Unit, Ministry of Information (United Kingdom); National Film Board of Canada (Canada); Columbia Pictures of Canada
- Release date: 13 June 1940
- Running time: 22 minutes, 51 seconds
- Countries: United Kingdom; Canada
- Language: English

Squadron 992 is a 23-minute 1940 British propaganda film produced by the General Post Office GPO Film Unit of the British Ministry of Information and re-distributed by the National Film Board of Canada (NFB) as part of their wartime Canada Carries On series. (Note: The NFB was still known at the time, as the Canadian Government Motion Picture Bureau.) The film was directed by Harry Watt and produced by Alberto Cavalcanti. Squadron 992 describes the training and operations in 1940 of No. 992 (Barrage Balloon) Squadron RAF, a Royal Air Force (RAF) barrage balloon unit stationed in the United Kingdom. The film's French version title was Escadrille 992.

== Synopsis ==
By 1940, in the Second World War, 40,000 RAF personnel are in the RAF Balloon Command, created to protect urban centres and key targets such as industrial areas, ports and harbours. Balloons were intended to defend against Luftwaffe dive bombers attacking from heights up to 5,000 feet (1,500 m). The balloons forced the bombers to fly higher and into the range of concentrated anti-aircraft fire. A third of the balloon barrage were deployed over the London area.

Specialized training was involved in learning about riggings, how to secure the rope ties, inflation and maintenance of the balloons that included patching the outer skin when tears or leaks were detected. The entire Squadron 992 also had to be mobile and able to set up and maintain the balloons, using a converted Crossley lorry that not only carried the balloon but had the winch equipment to raise it to height.

In 1939, the Luftwaffe attack on the Forth Bridge in Scotland ended with Supermarine Spitfires from No. 603 RAF "City of Edinburgh" Squadron intercepting the raiders. During the low-level attack, the Spitfires shot down the first German aircraft downed over Britain in the war.

Although the enemy raid was countered, Squadron 992 was rushed to the north to protect the coasts, estuaries and harbours in Scotland. Within a day, the 50 lorries from the squadron immediately created a barrage balloon area near the strategic Forth Bridge, setting up a headquarters and operations centre, designating varied sites for balloons to be located (including in farmers' yards) and establishing a supply depot to maintain the balloons.

== Cast ==
- Jock Harrison as Himself
- Tommy Evans as Himself
- Jim Gilder as Himself

== Production ==
The General Post Office Film Unit (United Kingdom) was originally set up to make short informational films publicizing the work of the Post Office, but by the late 1930s, had widened their scope to include documentaries about other aspects of life in Great Britain. After the outbreak of war in 1939, the GPO Film Unit concentrated on making propaganda films about various aspects of the war effort, of which Squadron 992 was one of the earliest productions. A request from the squadron commander to make a film publicising the role of his squadron, precipitated the production. (Note: By the end of the Battle of Britain, Luftwaffe bomber tactics had changed drastically with dive bombers withdrawn, resulting in less emphasis on a barrage balloon defence. Squadron 992 was subsequently withdrawn as "out-of-date".)

Squadron 992 incorporated scenes of the training of the balloon squadron as it was being formed then recreates an incident involving a Luftwaffe attack on the Forth Bridge on 16 October 1939. (Note: The aircraft used in the simulated attack included a Bristol Blenheim bomber, a Spitfire fighter aircraft and inadvertently, through stock footage, a Hawker Hurricane fighter.)

When acquired by the National Film Board of Canada, Squadron 992 was released as part of the Canada Carries On series of morale-boosting propaganda short films. The film series was made in cooperation with the Director of Public Information, Herbert Lash.

== Reception ==
As one of the earliest GPO Film Unit's wartime productions, Squadron 992 was previewed for the French Minister of Information in early April 1940, before being issued as a theatrical release in Great Britain. In a contemporary review in The Spectator by Basil Wright, he noted that the documentary was very effective and, "... there are many points which all film-goers will recognise with that special delight which real screen mastery always brings."

As part of the Canada Carries On series, Squadron 992 was produced in 35 mm for the theatrical market. Each film was shown over a six-month period as part of the shorts or newsreel segments in approximately 800 theatres across Canada. The NFB had an arrangement with Famous Players theatres to ensure that Canadians from coast-to-coast could see them, with further distribution by Columbia Pictures.

After the six-month theatrical tour ended, individual films were made available on 16 mm to schools, libraries, churches and factories, extending the life of these films for another year or two. They were also made available to film libraries operated by university and provincial authorities. A total of 199 films were produced before the series was canceled in 1959. Squadron 992 was later released in the BFI DVD compilation, If War Should Come: The GPO Film Unit Collection, Volume Three (2009).
