= GPO Film Unit =

Film production company

The GPO Film Unit was a subdivision of the UK General Post Office. The unit was established in 1933, taking on responsibilities of the Empire Marketing Board Film Unit. Headed by John Grierson, it was set up to produce sponsored documentary films mainly related to the activities of the GPO.

Among the films it produced were Harry Watt's and Basil Wright's Night Mail (1936), featuring music by Benjamin Britten and poetry by W. H. Auden, which is the best known. Directors who worked for the unit included Humphrey Jennings, Alberto Cavalcanti, Paul Rotha, Stuart Legg, Harry Watt, Basil Wright and a young Norman McLaren. Poet and memoirist Laurie Lee also worked as a scriptwriter in the unit from 1939–1940.

In 1940 the GPO Film Unit became the Crown Film Unit, under the control of the Ministry of Information.

In late 2008 the British Film Institute issued a first collection of selected films from the Unit. Titled Addressing the Nation, it comprises fifteen titles from the years 1933 to 1935, including Song of Ceylon. A second volume, We Live in Two Worlds was released in February 2009, with 22 films covering the period 1936 to 1938, and includes Night Mail. A third (and final) volume, If War Should Come, appeared in July 2009 and includes London Can Take It!

== Filmography ==
Year	Title	Director	Notes
1940	Air Communique	Ralph Elton	
1940	Britain at Bay		Written by J. B. Priestley
1940	The Front Line	Harry Watt	
1940	London Can Take It!	Humphrey Jennings & Harry Watt	Oscar-nominated for Best Short Subject 1941
1940	Spring Offensive	Humphrey Jennings	
1940	War and Order	Charles Hasse	
1939	The City	Ralph Elton	Subtitle: "A Film Talk by Sir Charles Bressey"
1939	The First Days	Pat Jackson, Humphrey Jennings & Harry Watt	
1939	Forty Million People	John Monck	Narrated by Ralph Richardson
1939	The Islanders	Maurice Harvey	
1939	Love on the Wing	Norman McLaren	Animation
1939	Men of the Alps	Alberto Cavalcanti	
1939	A Midsummer Day's Work	Alberto Cavalcanti	
1939	Spare Time	Humphrey Jennings	
1939	Squadron 992	Harry Watt	
1938	Four Barriers	Alberto Cavalcanti	
1938	Mony a Pickle	Norman McLaren & Richard Massingham	Animation
1938	N or NW	Len Lye	Comedy
1938	The H.P.O. – Heavenly Post Office	Lotte Reiniger	Animation
1938	North Sea	Harry Watt	
1937	Book Bargain	Norman McLaren	
1937	Job in a Million	Evelyn Cherry	
1937	The Line to Tschierva Hut	Alberto Cavalcanti	
1937	News for the Navy	Norman McLaren	
1937	Roadways	William Coldstream and Stuart Legg	Music by Ernst Hermann Meyer
1937	The Saving of Bill Blewitt	Harry Watt	Drama, starring Bill Blewitt as himself
1937	Trade Tattoo	Len Lye	Animation
1937	We Live in Two Worlds	Alberto Cavalcanti	Written by J. B. Priestley
1936	Message from Geneva	Alberto Cavalcanti	
1936	Night Mail	Harry Watt & Basil Wright	Written by W. H. Auden. Music by Benjamin Britten
1936	Rainbow Dance	Len Lye	Animation
1935	Air Post	Geoffrey Clark	
1935	Coal Face	Alberto Cavalcanti	Written by W. H. Auden. Music by Benjamin Britten
1935	A Colour Box	Len Lye	Animation
1935	The King's Stamp	William Coldstream	With Barnett Freedman
1934	Pett and Pott: A Fairy Story of the Suburbs	Alberto Cavalcanti	Comedy, starring J. M. Reeves, Marjorie Fone and June Godfrey
1934	Locomotives	Humphrey Jennings	
1934	Song of Ceylon	Basil Wright	
1934	The Story of the Wheel	Humphrey Jennings	

== See also ==
- Edgar Anstey
