= Ramón Aguirre =

Ramón Aguirre may refer to:

- Ramón Aguirre Velázquez (born 1935), Mexican politician, head of the Federal District Department in 1982–1988
- Ramón Aguirre Suárez (1944–2013), Argentine footballer
- Ramón Aguirre Rodríguez (born 1953), Spanish politician
