= Konrad Bercovici =

American writer

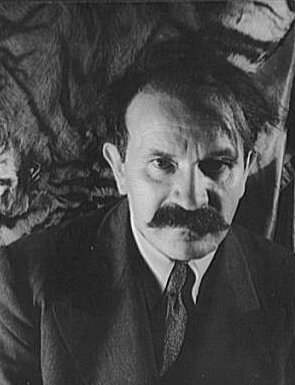
Konrad Bercovici in 1933

Konrad Bercovici (June 22, 1882–December 27, 1961) was a Romanian-American writer.

== Life and career ==
Born in Romania, into a non-observing Jewish family, in 1882, Konrad Bercovici grew up chiefly in Galaţi. His family was polyglot, teaching their children Greek, Romanian, French and German, and they mixed freely with Greeks, Romanians, Russians, Turks, Jews, and Roma that moved throughout Dobrudja and the Danubian Delta region. According to his autobiography, Bercovici especially developed a close connection with local Roma through contact with his Roma nursemaid, her family, and the Roma with whom his father traded horses. The family remained in Romania until his father died from injuries sustained during anti-Semitic riots in Galaţi when Bercovici was 11.

After his father's death, most of the family emigrated to Paris. Konrad worked there during preparations for the 1900 World's Fair, and his education was influenced by witnessing public debates and recriminations surrounding the Dreyfus Affair. Bercovici went to the Université Populaire where he studied to be an organist. In Paris, he met his wife, the sculptor Naomi Librescu. Together, they emigrated to North America. After some time in Montréal, Canada, the family settled on the Lower East Side, Manhattan, New York City. To make ends meet Bercovici worked in sweatshops, gave piano lessons, and played the organ for nickelodeons. He had begun his work as a writer as a journalist for a Yiddish paper in Montreal, but garnered attention when his first English-language book Crimes of Charity—with an introduction by John Reed—exposed controversial practices in private charities in New York City.

Bercovici continued to write articles as a journalist throughout his career, but became best known for his literary fiction that explored Gypsy themes. Stories like "Ghitza," and "The Bear Tamer's Daughter" established Bercovici as a peer of his contemporaries in the 1920s when he was often included in World's Best Short Fiction collections. Once his career as an author took off, Bercovici frequented the Hotel Algonquin. At this time, he and his wife Naomi became close friends with Paul Robeson and his wife Essie.

His success as a writer allowed Bercovici to travel and produce well-received examinations of Ethnic immigrants making their homes throughout the United States. In his work Around the world in New York he devotes a chapter, titled "Spain", to the Spanish corner of the city, called Little Spain. Most often, Bercovici traveled to Europe where he ran in circles with Lost Generation writers F. Scott Fitzgerald and Ernest Hemingway.

He went on to write works of biography, travel and fiction. He also wrote articles for Harper's.

Bercovici's stories generated interest in Hollywood where he worked as a screenwriter for several years. There, he befriended Charlie Chaplin, Mary Pickford, and Douglas Fairbanks.

Naturalist American writer Theodore Dreiser had copies of his work in his library. Through his brother Joseph, he was the uncle of Leonardo Bercovici, the great-uncle of Eric Bercovici, and the great-great-uncle of Luca Bercovici.

An unpublished memoir about the Algonquin Round Table social club by Bercovici was edited by his granddaughter Mirana Comstock and published in 2024.

== Bibliography ==
- Crimes of Charity (1917)
- Dust of New York (1919)
- Ghitza and Other Romances of Gypsy Blood (1921)
- Gypsy Blood (1922) London
- Murdo (1923)
- Love and the Gypsy (1923) London
- Around The World In New York (1924)
- Iliana: Stories of a Wandering Race (1924)
- Costa's Daughter (1924)
- Between Earth and Sky (1925)
- Best Short Stories of the World (1925)
- The Marriage Guest (1925)
- On New Shores (1925)
- Singing Winds: Stories of Gipsy Life (1926)
- The Volga Boatman (1926)
- Alexander: A Romantic Biography (1928)
- The Story of the Gypsies (1928)
- Nights Abroad (1928)
- Peasants (1928)
- There's Money in Poetry (1928)
- Between Earth And Sky (1929)
- The Crusades (1929)
- The Power of Women (1929)
- Steel Against Steel (1929)
- Stormy Hearts (1929)
- Wine, Women and Song (1929)
- Blood and Lava (1930)
- Land, an Old Man and His Wife (1930)
- For Love of Zaska and Other Stories (1930)
- When Faith in Love Returns (1930)
- For a Song (1931)
- Manhattan Side-Show (1931)
- That Royal Lover (1931)
- Against the Sky (1932)
- The Incredible Balkans (1932)
- Main Entrance (1932)
- A Romany Chai (1933) London
- It's the Gypsy in Me (1941)
- The Exodus (1947)
- Savage Prodigal (1948)
- Gypsies, Their Life, Lore and Legends (1983)
- The Algonquin Round Table: 25 Years with the Legends Who Lunch (2024)

== Bercovici v. Chaplin ==
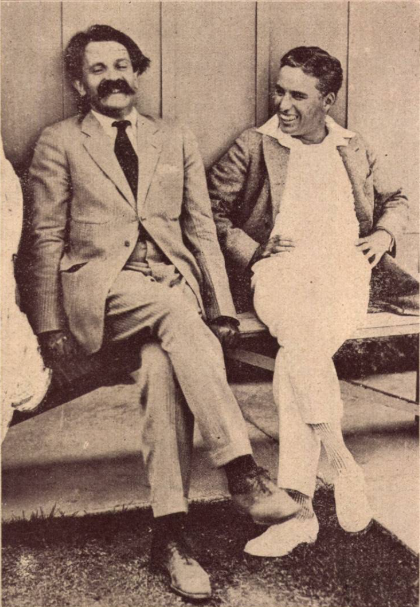
Konrad Bercovici and Charlie Chaplin, Realitatea Ilustrată, 1930-08-21, nr. 186, p. 8

The Charlie Chaplin hit The Great Dictator (1940) was the subject of a plagiarism lawsuit (Bercovici v. Chaplin) in 1947 against Chaplin. The case was settled, with Chaplin paying Konrad Bercovici $90,000, plus $5,000 expenses. In return, Bercovici acknowledged that Chaplin was the sole author of the film and was given exclusive rights to the screenplay, as well as two others by Bercovici. In his autobiography, Chaplin insisted that he had been the sole writer of the movie's script. He came to a settlement, though, because of his "unpopularity in the States at that moment and being under such court pressure, [he] was terrified, not knowing what to expect next."

Bercovici was represented in his plagiarism suit by attorney Louis Nizer. In his book My Life in Court Nizer goes into detail about Bercovici v. Chaplin: "The claim was that Chaplin had approached Bercovici to produce one of his gypsy stories as a motion picture and in the course of those friendly negotiations Bercovici gave him an outline of "The Great Dictator" story about a barber who looks like Hitler and is confused with him. Chaplin denied ever having negotiated for the gypsy story and also denied the rest of the claim...One day, upon my continuous inquiry, Bercovici suddenly had a flash of memory. He recalled that he had met Chaplin in a theater in Hollywood and that Chaplin had pointed out a Russian baritone in the audience whom he thought might play the leading role in the gypsy story. Bercovici believed that they spoke to the singer that evening and that he might possibly be a witness." Nizer tracked down Kushnevitz, the Russian baritone at issue: "He [Kushnevitz] recalled the incident vividly, for this, as he put it, was one of the great moments in his life - the possibility that he would star in a Chaplin picture. Chaplin had called him down the aisle of the theater and had given him his private telephone number. He pulled out a little black book from his back pocket and he still had the number written in it. He was a perfect witness in view of Chaplin's denial of any interest in Bercovici's gypsy story."

== See also ==
- Helios Gómez
- Romany Marie
- Mariano R. Vázquez
