= Reynolds v. Pegler =

American legal case

- Court: United States Court of Appeals for the Second Circuit
- Full case name: Quentin Reynolds v. Westbrook Pegler et al
- Argued: Feb. 16-17, 1955
- Decided: June 7, 1955
- Citation: 223 F.2d 429 (2nd Cir. 1955)

Case history
- Prior history: 123 F. Supp. 36 (S.D.N.Y. 1954)

Court membership
- Judges sitting: Jerome Frank, Harold Medina, Stephen W. Brennan (N.D.N.Y.)

Case opinions
- Majority: Medina, joined by Frank, Brennan

Reynolds v. Pegler, 223 F.2d 429 (2nd Cir. 1955), was a landmark libel decision in which Quentin Reynolds successfully sued right-wing columnist Westbrook Pegler, resulting in a then-record judgment of $175,001.

The case has its origins in a heated dispute between liberal journalist Heywood Broun and conservative Westbrook Pegler. Broun died in 1939, but ten years later, author Dale Kramer wrote a book about Broun's life entitled The Heywood Broun His Friends Recall.

Quentin Reynolds wrote a review of this book for the New York Herald Tribune book review which was published November 20, 1949. In the book review, Reynolds wrote that in 1939, Pegler had called Broun a liar. Reynolds further wrote that Broun was so distraught over this allegedly false charge that he was unable to sleep or relax, and that as a result, Broun, who was suffering only a cold, died.

The review infuriated Pegler, who regarded the review as a charge of "moral homicide". Pegler lashed out in a response entitled "On Heywood Broun and Quentin Reynolds" in the Hearst Corporation paper New York Journal American. Pegler reiterated his belief that Broun was indeed a "notorious liar" who was a "dirty fighter" that "made his living at controversy". Pegler also dismissed any suggestion that he had been responsible for Broun's death.

However, Pegler did not stop at denouncing the late Broun. Pegler went on to personally attack Reynolds, asserting that "Reynolds and his girl friend of the moment were nuding along the public road"; that "as Reynolds was riding to Heywood's grave with her, he proposed marriage to the widow". Pegler accused Reynolds of being "one of the great individual profiteers of the war" and claimed Reynolds had been involved in fraud involving war contracts. Pegler also accused Reynolds of cowardice, and said he had been exposed by people who had "peeled him of his mangy hide and nailed it to the barn door with the yellow streak glaring for the world to see".

In response to the article, Reynolds sued both Pegler and his publisher, the Hearst Corporation, for libel. The jury awarded Reynolds $1 in compensatory damages and $175,000 in punitive damages. At the time, it was the largest libel judgment ever.

Reynolds v. Pegler inspired the 1963 Broadway play A Case of Libel by Henry Denker, which was itself later adapted into two TV movies. The case was also detailed in a 1961 book by Reynold's attorney Louis Nizer entitled My Life in Court.

== Resources ==
- Louis Nizer. My Life in Court. (ISBN 1-56849-145-X)
- A Case of Libel (1968) at IMDb
- A Case of Libel (1983) at IMDb
