= Painted Boats =

- Original UK quad format film poster by John Piper.
- Directed by: Charles Crichton
- Written by: Louis MacNeice, Stephen Black, Michael McCarthy
- Produced by: Michael Balcon
- Starring: Jenny Laird; Bill Blewitt; Harry Fowler
- Cinematography: Douglas Slocombe
- Edited by: Leslie Allen
- Music by: John Greenwood
- Color process: Black and white
- Production company: Ealing Studios
- Distributed by: ABFD (UK)
- Release date: 29 October 1945 (UK)
- Running time: 63 minutes
- Country: United Kingdom
- Language: English

Painted Boats (US titles The Girl on the Canal or The Girl of the Canal) is a British drama film directed by Charles Crichton and released by Ealing Studios in 1945. Painted Boats, one of the lesser-known Ealing films of the period, is brief (63 minutes long), uses a little-known cast and has a slight storyline. It is however considered significant by waterways enthusiasts as a fictionalised documentary, providing a rare extensive filmic depiction of a long-gone way of life on England's working canal system in the 1940s. The narration was by Louis MacNeice, including some verse specially written to suit the onscreen action, most notably the sequence in which the narrow boat is being 'legged' through one of the tunnels. Much background information on canals and suggestions for suitable filming locations were provided by the writer L. T. C. Rolt, who also provided the title, and who records in his autobiography that he was disappointed to find that his name had not been included in the film's credits.

== Synopsis ==
Painted Boats focuses on two families living and working on cargo-carrying canal boats: the "traditional" Smiths on their horse-drawn boat and the "modern" Stoners on their motorised vessel. Despite some differences of opinion (Mr. Smith disapproves of motorised boats as he claims they churn up mud and damage canal banks) relations between the families are generally harmonious.

The main plot strand deals with the tentative attraction between Mary Smith and Ted Stoner, despite their differing viewpoints; Mary appreciates the gentle rhythm of traditional canal life, whereas Ted's ambition is to get off the canals and into mainstream life at the earliest opportunity. World War II intrudes when Ted is called up for military service, leaving the future for the pair uncertain.

== Main cast ==
- Jenny Laird as Mary Sophia Smith
- Bill Blewitt as Pa Smith
- May Hallatt as Ma (Sophia Angela) Smith
- Robert Griffiths as Ted Stoner
- Madoline Thomas as Mrs. Stoner
- Grace Arnold as Ted's sister
- Harry Fowler as Alf Stoner
- Megs Jenkins as Barmaid
- John Owers as Bill
- James McKechnie as Commentator (voice only)

== Location filming ==
Location filming took place on the 20-mile stretch of the Grand Union Canal between Stoke Bruerne and Braunston in Northamptonshire, including the Blisworth Tunnel – at 1.75 miles (2.82 km) in length, the third-longest canal tunnel in Britain. Insert shots feature the industrial landscapes of Stoke-on-Trent and the Black Country in Staffordshire, the famous Anderton Boat Lift in Cheshire, the Pontcysyllte Aqueduct in Wales and the Limehouse Cut in London.

A preserved section of the horse-drawn boat Sunny Valley as featured in the film is on display at Stoke Bruerne Canal Museum.

== Release ==
The film premiered on 24 September 1945 at the Tivoli Cinema on the Strand in London, as the second feature in a double bill with the film now known as And Then There Were None.

== Reception ==
The reviewer for The Times found that the film, "absorbs into itself some of the quiet loveliness of the English countryside in war-time. The voyage the boats make on the canals are absorbing to watch in the cinema."
