= Bill Blewitt =

English actor

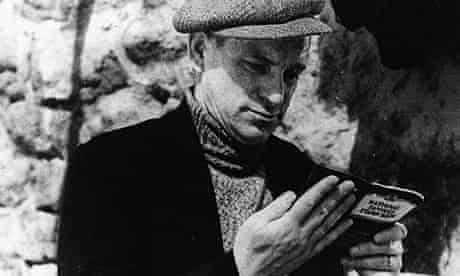
Bill Blewitt in The Saving of Bill Blewitt (1936)

Bill Blewitt was a Cornish postman 'discovered' by film-maker Harry Watt and cast in his 1936 film The Saving of Bill Blewitt. The documentary was about the Post Office Savings Bank and featured Blewitt and the villagers of Mousehole in Cornwall. Assistant director Pat Jackson remembered Blewitt's "mesmeric gift of the gab, a glorious Cornish accent, twinkling blue eyes, a grin as broad as 'Popeye' and the charismatic charm of the Celt." Charles Crichton remembered Blewitt as a natural actor and storyteller.

Blewitt went on to feature in several more films, sometimes as a supporting actor but also playing a major role, such as the father in the 1945 canal docu-drama Painted Boats.

== Filmography ==
- The Saving of Bill Blewitt (1936)
- North Sea (1938)
- The Foreman Went to France (1942)
- Nine Men (1943)
- Johnny Frenchman (1945)
- Painted Boats (1945)
