= A Song of Sixpence (play) =

1930 play

- Written by: Ian Hay; Guy Bolton
- Original language: English
- Genre: Comedy
- Setting: Dumpherston, Scotland

Premiere
- Date premiered: 10 March 1930
- Place premiered: Kings Theatre, Southsea

A Song of Sixpence is a 1930 British comedy play by the writers Ian Hay and Guy Bolton. Set in Scotland, it tells the story of three wives who rebel against their tight-fisted husbands.

The play premiered at the Kings Theatre, Southsea, before transferring to the West End. It ran for 79 performances at Daly's Theatre between 17 March and 25 May 1930. The cast included Ian Hunter, Olive Blakeney, Jack Lambert and Campbell Gullan.

== Bibliography ==
- Wearing, J.P. The London Stage 1930-1939: A Calendar of Productions, Performers, and Personnel. Rowman & Littlefield, 2014.
