= My Life in Court =

1961 memoir by Louis Nizer

- First edition
- Author: Louis Nizer
- Language: English
- Published: 1961
- Publisher: Doubleday & Company
- Publication place: United States
- Media type: Print (Hardcover)
- Pages: 524 pp. (first edition)
- OCLC: 636241551

My Life in Court is a 1961 memoir by American trial lawyer Louis Nizer documenting his career in law. The work was a best seller when it was first released, lasting for 72 weeks on The New York Times Bestsellers list.

== Background ==
The book is based on a number of court cases that Nizer argued in US courts. The original papers for many of these trials are held by the Columbia Law Library.

== Contents ==
All six cases depicted within the book are civil cases, which is unusual for legal fiction and non-fiction because of the greater sensationality of criminal law cases. The book depicts the following cases:

- Baron v. Leo Feist
- Reynolds v. Pegler (a landmark libel decision in which Quentin Reynolds successfully sued right-wing columnist Westbrook Pegler, resulting in a record judgment of $175,001)
- Bercovici v. Chaplin (a plagiarism lawsuit in 1947 against Charlie Chaplin)
- Cambell v. Loew's Inc.—which was presided over by judge Collins J. Seitz.
- Eleanor Holm v Billy Rose
- Foerster v. Ridder
- Dolly Astor v. John Astor

== Reception ==
The book was received favorably. Commentary magazine reviewer David T. Bazelon said he did not "understand why it has become a bestseller", but all in all "Properly read, it is an occasion for some real understanding of the trial man. Haphazardly or naively read, it is interesting, instructive, and even exciting." Bazelon challenges praise by Max Lerner that the work is "one of the great legal autobiographies of our time". Kirkus reviews gave less praise, calling the book "direct and orderly" and enjoyable by "Trial lawyers, law students, and the general public".

For the most part, academic and legal reviewers of the autobiography were particularly harsh critics of the book. In The Modern Law Review, British reviewer C.P. Harvey commented "I cannot help wondering what made Messrs. Heinmann think it would be good business to publish this book in [the United Kingdom]." He writes "I pronounce this book to be didactic, long-winded and pretentious" and describes it as an example of "the breadth of the ocean which lies between the English and American legal systems."

In the Osgoode Hall Law Journal, reviewer R. N. Starr described the work as not exactly realistic, and taken to "poetic license". His review is rather skeptical and mixed; he writes: "For my own part I would have preferred it, had Mr. Nizer put his wide experience to other purposes." In the Yale Law Review Joseph W. Bishop lambasts the piece as demonstrating the decline of legal practice, jury tried cases, and the flaws of the legal profession. Nonetheless, he describes the book as anything but "dry and indigestable reading" which is usually the case for accounts of legal cases.

Unlike other academic reviewers, American Bar Association Journal reviewer Alfred Schweppe praised the book as a "must for every lawyer searching for an answer to success in the courtroom" and then describing the style as "Moving with an easy finished prose".

== Legacy ==
The book has inspired a number of people to become lawyers, including Laurie Levenson and Roy Black. Nizer's subsequent book The Jury Returns follows much the same format and pattern as My Life in Court, attempting to create a similar work and success.

=== Adaptations ===
The book was adapted into the 1963 Broadway play A Case of Libel by Henry Denker. The book was also adapted into a television film. Both depict the Reynolds v. Pegler case.

== Further sources ==
- "My life in court / Louis Nizer; interviewed by Elsa Knight Thompson". www.pacificaradioarchives.org. Pacifica Radio Archives.
