= The King's Stamp =

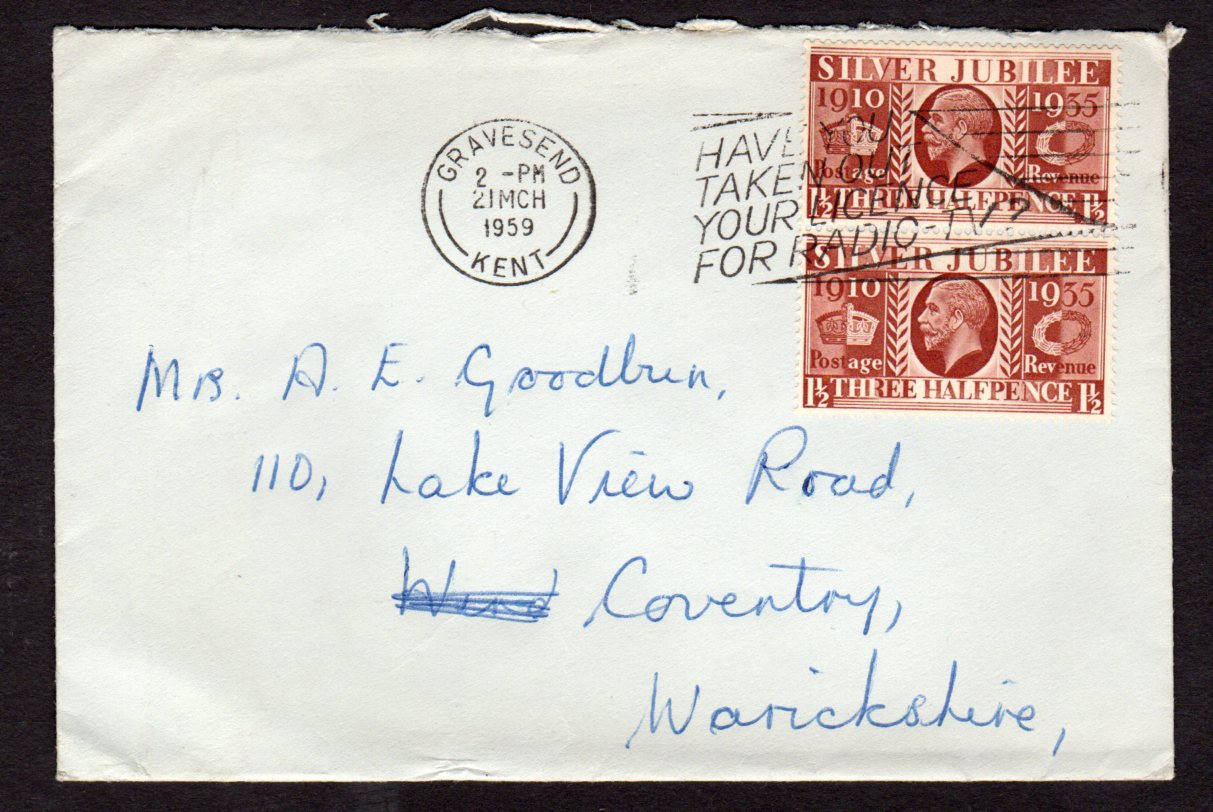
- Silver Jubilee 1.5d x 2 on cover 1959 Gravesend Kent
- Directed by: William Coldstream
- Produced by: Alberto Cavalcanti
- Starring: Barnett Freedman et al
- Cinematography: F.H. Jones; H.E. Fowle
- Edited by: Richard McNaughton
- Music by: Benjamin Britten
- Production company: GPO Film Unit
- Release date: 1935
- Running time: 20 minutes
- Country: United Kingdom
- Language: English

The King's Stamp is a 1935 short film produced by Alberto Cavalcanti under the auspices of the GPO Film Unit and directed by William Coldstream. It was commissioned as part of the celebrations of the Silver Jubilee of George V in 1935. The music was composed by Benjamin Britten.

== Synopsis ==
The film opens with commercial artist Barnett Freedman sketching designs before working freehand to produce a lithostone. In the second section, Freedman's relaxed dealings with senior GPO officials are contrasted with Rowland Hill's struggles to introduce the penny post'. Hill gets his way eventually, but the public still struggle with the idea of stamps. Victorian England is depicted as snobbish and illiterate, quite unlike the modern Britain run by the clever managers and innovators of the interwar years. As the stamp is being printed, the film turns from black and white to colour.

The final part of the film looks at the rise of stamp collecting, a democratic hobby enjoyed by the young and old of all classes. The film ends with stills from King George V's private stamp collection. The King's interest in stamp collecting was a part of his public appeal and it did not escape the King's notice that his Silver Jubilee, on 6 May, was exactly 95 years after the first Penny Black. The shots from his 328-album stamp collection made the film of lasting philatelic interest and the enduring popularity of philately has made this one of the most watched documentaries of all time.

== Cast ==
- Barnett Freedman
