= Barnett Freedman =

British artist, illustrator, and designer

Barnett Freedman CBE RDI
- Born: 19 May 1901; Stepney, London
- Died: 4 January 1958 (aged 56); Cornwall Gardens, off Gloucester Road, London
- Education: Saint Martin's School of Art; Royal College of Art
- Known for: Lithography, typography, illustration

Barnett Freedman CBE RDI (19 May 1901 – 4 January 1958) was a British painter, commercial designer, book illustrator, typographer, and lithographer.

== Biography ==
=== Early life and education ===
Barnett Freedman was born in Stepney, in the east end of London, the son of Louis Freedman, a journeyman tailor, and Reiza Ruk, Jewish immigrants from Russia. Freedman's only formal education was at an elementary school, and from the age of nine to 13 he was a bedridden patient in the London Hospital. There he learnt to read and write and was taught to play the violin. At the age of fifteen, he obtained work as an office boy, then turning to draughtsmanship, initially with a monumental mason and subsequently at an architect's office. Freedman's strong interest in letterforms grew out of this everyday work. He attended evening classes at Saint Martin's School of Art, hoping to win a London County Council scholarship. Although Freedman was initially unsuccessful, William Rothenstein, Principal of the Royal College of Art, was impressed by his potential and used his influence to enable Freedman to be admitted to the College.

=== 1920s and 1930s ===
After leaving the Royal College of Art in 1925, Freedman tried to earn his living as a painter. He married a fellow student, Beatrice Claudia Guercio; and, after hard times, gained an introduction to the publishers, Faber and Gwyer, for whom he illustrated Laurence Binyon's Wonder Night, in the Ariel Poems series. Barnett illustrated two further titles, Walter de la Mare's News and "Behold This Dreamer", and Roy Campbell's Choosing a Mast, while Guercio did sketches for de la Mare's poem, A Snowdrop. Barnett designed book jackets for the firm for twenty-five years. Nearly all were auto-lithographed on stone with hand-drawn lettering. During this period, he carried out a wide range of work for other publishers and worked extensively also on package design. Freedman's first solo exhibition was in 1927 at the Bloomsbury Bookshop in central London.

Faber gave Freedman his first major commission, an assignment to design and illustrate Siegfried Sassoon's Memoirs of an Infantry Officer. Published in 1931, the book was the subject of controversial reviews but brought Freedman some prominence. Freedman had by that time become interested in the difficult medium of auto-lithography, where the artist draws his own designs on to the stones without the intervention of a trade craftsmen or photomechanical means. Freedman received advice from T. E. Griffits, the most influential lithographer of the time, who held sway at Vincent Brooks, Day & Son.

Following work on an annual report for the Post Office, Freedman was chosen to design the 1935 postage stamp issues to commemorate the Silver Jubilee of King George V. The distinctive and handsome nature of this work brought him to wider public notice. His work - which took him just a weekend - and the subsequent printing of the stamps was the subject of The King's Stamp, a documentary film by the GPO Film Unit. Freedman also designed Jubilee postal orders, in various values from sixpence to £1. Freedman was now recognised as a force in autolithographic printmaking, and his down-to-earth attitude and lack of pretension made him welcome among the craftsmen at the Curwen Press, the Baynard Press and Chromoworks, the leading firms in the industry. For the Baynard Press, he also designed the Baynard Claudia typeface, which he named after his wife, Beatrice Claudia Guercio. Guercio was also an artist of some repute and had herself been commissioned to design a new GPO greetings telegram to commemorate the 1937 Coronation of George VI.

In 1936 Freedman illustrated George Borrow's Lavengro for the Limited Editions Club of New York. By this time Freedman's lithography had entered a new phase, where the unique qualities of the medium were taken into a new dimension with the artist's rainbow palette. He developed a technique whereby the black and white illustrations printed by line block simulated lithography, bringing a unity to the book. Although Lavengro was poorly subscribed, George Macy, owner of the book club, admired Freedman's work to such an extent that he was subsequently commissioned to illustrate Henry IV Part One, for the Limited Editions Club multi-volume Shakespeare. Tolstoy's War and Peace (1938) and Anna Karenina (1951) are recognised as two of the finest examples of twentieth century book design and have ensured Freedman a place in the history of book production. For Macy's less exclusive Heritage Press, Freedman illustrated Dickens's Oliver Twist (1939), Emily Brontë's Wuthering Heights (1941) and Charlotte Brontë's Jane Eyre (1942). The Bronte novels are challenging for the illustrator, and Freedman's interpretations were regarded as among the best. Other book jackets designed by Freedman during this period included those for Dance of the Quick and the Dead by Sacheverell Sitwell and Inhale and Exhale by William Saroyan, both of which were published in 1936 by Faber.

=== World War II ===
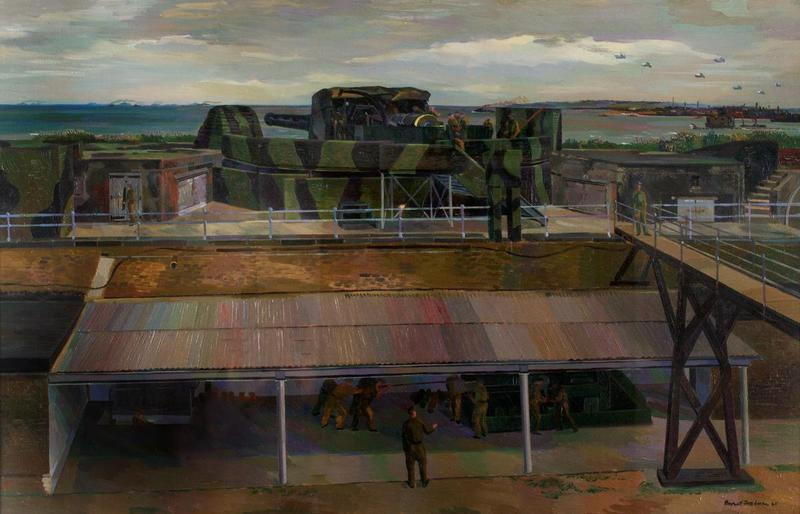
The Gun (1940) (Art.IWM ART LD391)

At the outbreak of the Second World War, Freedman was appointed as a full-time salaried war artist by the War Artists' Advisory Committee and sent to France in April 1940 to record the work of the British Expeditionary Force. He painted a number of works there but was frustrated by a perceived lack of support, particularly transport provision. He was evacuated to England in May 1940 and worked on coastal defence subjects in Sheerness and the Isle of Sheppey. His full-time contract with WAAC ended in February 1941 after which WAAC purchased individual pieces from him but also offered him several short-term contracts with the Admiralty. By July 1941, Freedman was on board HMS Repulse, and produced the painting 15-inch Gun Turret, HMS Repulse and several individual portraits of her crew. The gun turret picture became a print, produced by the Baynard Press for the National Gallery. At the end of 1942 he began an album of portraits of aircraft factory workers and then spent time aboard HMS Tribune, which resulted in another album of portraits and the painting Interior of a Submarine(1943), which was briefly displayed at the National Gallery before being removed from view under wartime censorship regulations. The painting is now in the permanent collection of the Tate. In June 1944 Freedman went to Portsmouth, before travelling to France after the D-Day landings. There he recorded scenes around the landing beaches and at the invasion headquarters, but in July was taken ill and sent to hospital in Liverpool.

=== Later life ===
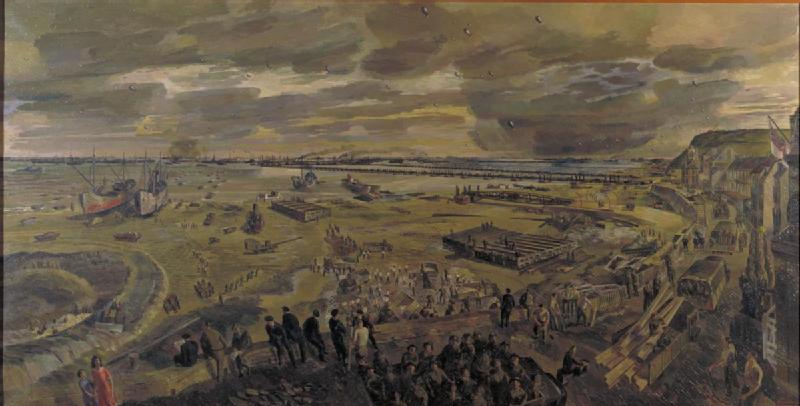
The Landing in Normandy; Arromanches, D-day plus 20, 26th June 1944 (Art.IWM ART LD5816)

In post-war years, as a teacher at the Royal College of Art and the Ruskin School of Art, he was regarded by many of his students as an inspiring, if unpredictable, mentor who had little regard for time-wasters.

Among Freedman's later book designs were those for the 1952 print of The Palm Wine Drinkard by Amos Tutuola and the 1953 edition of The Devil Rides Outside by John Howard Griffin. The inimitable style of Freedman's book jackets drew the eye of the 'bookshop prowlers', as they were termed by Maurice Collis, an author who realised and admired the important role that Freedman's art played in bookshop sales. Freedman produced a stream of colourful posters and black-and-white drawings for press advertisements. At Chromoworks he had total oversight of the production of the Lyons lithographs, a series of fine colour prints by British artists, which were displayed in the teashops of J. Lyons and Co., now regarded as a major achievement in bringing good art to 'the masses'. Among his last works were a series of lithographs, including a poster The Darts Champion, to promote the first Guinness Book of World Records published. Unlike many of his contemporaries, who lived and worked into old age, Freedman's precarious health led to an early death, at work in his home studio on 4 January 1958. A major retrospective exhibition of his work, organised by the Arts Council, was held at the Tate later in 1958 but a second such exhibition was not held until 2020 when the Pallant House Gallery hosted Barnett Freedman: Designs for Modern Britain.

== Honours ==
- 1947 – Commander of the Order of the British Empire
- 1949 – Royal Designer for Industry
- 1956 – Honorary Fellow of the Royal College of Art
- 1956 – Fellow of the Royal Society of Arts
