= Went the Day Well? =

- Theatrical release poster by Dudley Pout
- Directed by: Alberto Cavalcanti
- Written by: Graham Greene (story); John Dighton; Angus MacPhail; Diana Morgan
- Produced by: Michael Balcon
- Starring: Leslie Banks; Mervyn Johns; Basil Sydney; C. V. France; Valerie Taylor; Thora Hird; David Farrar
- Cinematography: Wilkie Cooper
- Edited by: Sidney Cole
- Music by: William Walton
- Distributed by: Ealing Studios
- Release date: 7 December 1942 (UK)
- Running time: 92 minutes
- Country: United Kingdom
- Language: English
- Budget: $680,000

Went the Day Well? is a 1942 British war film adapted from a story by Graham Greene and directed by Alberto Cavalcanti. It was produced by Michael Balcon of Ealing Studios and served as unofficial propaganda for the war effort. The film shows a village in southern England taken over by German paratroopers, reflecting the greatest fear of the British public of the time, although the threat of German invasion had largely receded. The film is notable for its unusually, for the time, frank depiction of ruthless violence.

== Plot ==
The story is told in flashback by Charles Sims. During the Second World War, a group of seemingly authentic British soldiers arrive in the small, fictitious English village of Bramley End. It is the Whitsun weekend, life is even quieter than usual, and there is almost no road traffic. At first, they are welcomed by the villagers, until doubts set in about their true purpose and identity.

After they are revealed to be German soldiers intended to form the vanguard of an invasion of Britain, they round up the residents and hold them captive in the local church. The Reverend Ashton is shot dead while sounding the church bell in alarm. To reach the outside world, many of the villagers take action. Such plans include writing a message on an egg and giving it with five others to the local paper boy Johnnie Wade for his mother; they are crushed when Mrs Fraser's cousin Maude runs over the dropped package with her car. Members of the local Home Guard are ambushed and shot dead by the Germans.

Mrs Fraser puts a note in Maude's pocket, but she idly uses it to wedge her noisy car window; her dog, Edward, chews it to shreds after it blows onto the back seat. Mrs Collins, the postmistress, manages to kill a German with a hatchet and tries to telephone for help, but the young women on the telephone exchange see her light and decide that she can wait. Mrs Collins is then killed by a German soldier who walks into the shop and sees her handiwork. One of the women finally picks up the phone but there is no response. The captive civilians attempt to warn the local Home Guard, but are betrayed by the village squire Oliver Wilsford, who is revealed to be a German collaborator. He stabs village constable Joe Garbett to death as he attempts to escape through the churchyard during a thunderstorm.

A young boy, George Truscott, escapes from the manor house. He meets a poacher, Bill Purvis, in the woods, and Purvis advises him on how best to raise the alarm. Purvis creates a diversion to draw attention away from George, but is shot dead while doing so. George is wounded in the leg, but manages to alert the British Army after limping to a nearby village and being taken in by the Drews. British soldiers arrive and are helped by some of the villagers, including Ivy Dorking and Peggy Pryde of the Women's Land Army, who have managed to escape, barricade their position, and arm themselves with captured German weapons. The women kill some of the Germans after a short battle. Wilsford is shot dead by the vicar's daughter, Nora, who discovers his treachery as he attempts to let the remaining Germans into the barricaded house.

During the battle, many of the villagers who left to fight are wounded or killed; Mrs Fraser dies after saving the children from a hand grenade, smothering the explosion. The British troops arrive at Bramley End, finishing off the remaining Germans. Sims shows the Germans' grave in the churchyard and explains proudly "Yes, that's the only bit of England they got."

== Cast ==
- Leslie Banks as Oliver Wilsford, the treacherous squire
- C. V. France as the Reverend Ashton, the vicar
- Valerie Taylor as Nora Ashton, the vicar's daughter
- Marie Lohr as Mrs Fraser
- Basil Sydney as Kommandant Ortler, alias Major Hammond
- David Farrar as Lt Jung, alias Lt Maxwell
- Harry Fowler as George Truscott
- Elizabeth Allan as Peggy Pryde (a Land Army Girl)
- Frank Lawton as Tom Sturry
- Thora Hird as Ivy Dawking (a Land Army Girl)
- Muriel George as Mrs Collins, the postmistress
- Patricia Hayes as Daisy
- Mervyn Johns as Charles Sims
- Johnnie Schofield as PC Joe Garbett
- Edward Rigby as Bill Purvis, the poacher
- Norman Pierce as Jim Sturry
- Kathleen Boutall as Mrs Sturry
- Hilda Bayley as Cousin Maude
- Ellis Irving as Harry Drew
- Irene Arnold as Mrs Drew
- Norman Shelley as Bob Owen
- Grace Arnold as Mrs Owen
- Philippa Hiatt as Mrs Bates
- Lillian Ellias as Bridget
- Gerald Moore as Johnnie Wade
- Charles Paton as Harry Brown
- Josephine Middleton as Mrs Carter
- Anthony Pilbeam as Ted Garbett
- Arthur Ridley as Father Owen
- Mavis Villiers as Violet
- Josie Welsford as June
- John Slater as German sergeant
- James Donald as German corporal
- Men of the Gloucestershire Regiment

== Production ==
=== Writing ===
The film was based on a short story by the author Graham Greene entitled "The Lieutenant Died Last". The film's title is based on an epitaph written by the classical scholar John Maxwell Edmonds. It originally appeared in The Times on 6 February 1918 entitled "Four Epitaphs".

Went the day well?
We died and never knew.
But, well or ill,
Freedom, we died for you.

"Went the day well" also appears in an unidentified newspaper cutting in a scrapbook now held in the RAF Museum (AC97/127/50), and in a collection of First World War poems collated by Vivien Noakes.

=== Casting ===
This was the first significant role of Thora Hird's career, and one of the last for C. V. France.

=== Filming ===
Exterior scenes were shot on location in the village of Turville in Buckinghamshire.

It was once known as They Came in Khaki.

== Reception ==
The film reinforced the message that civilians should be vigilant against fifth columnists and that "careless talk costs lives". By the time the film was released the threat of invasion had subsided somewhat but it was still seen as an effective piece of propaganda and its reputation has grown over the years. It has been noted that by opening and closing in a predicted future where not only had the war been won but a (fictitious) full-scale German invasion of Britain defeated and by presenting a scenario where all echelons of British society unite for the common good (the lady of the manor sacrifices herself without hesitation, for example), the film's message was morale-boosting and positive rather than scaremongering. Anthony Quinn, a film critic for The Independent on Sunday, commented in 2010, "It subtly captures an immemorial quality of English rural life—the church, the local gossip, the sense of community—and that streak of native 'pluck' that people believed would see off Hitler".

On the review aggregator website Rotten Tomatoes, 93% of 14 critics' reviews are positive.

== Legacy ==
In 2005 it was named as one of the "100 Greatest War Films" in a poll by Britain's Channel 4. The 1975 book, The Eagle Has Landed and the later film use some of the same ideas. In July 2010, StudioCanal and the British Film Institute National Archive released a restoration of the Went the Day Well? to significant critical acclaim. Tom Huddleston of Time Out termed it "jawdroppingly subversive. Cavalcanti establishes, with loving care and the occasional wry wink, the ultimate bucolic English scene, then takes an almost sadistic delight in tearing it to bloody shreds in an orgy of shockingly blunt, matter-of-fact violence". When the restored film opened at Film Forum in New York City in 2011, A. O. Scott of The New York Times called it "undeservedly forgotten... [H]ome-front propaganda has rarely seemed so cutthroat or so cunning".

== Home media ==
The film was released on DVD by StudioCanal in 2011, with Cavalcanti's Yellow Caesar and a 2010 BBC Radio 3 profile of the main feature by Simon Heffer as extras. It was subsequently included in the StudioCanal Blu-Ray boxset "Their Finest Hour: 5 British WWII Classics" in March 2020.

== See also ==
- Battle of Graveney Marsh – WW2 battle in England (1940)
- Operation Sea Lion, Germany's planned invasion of Britain in 1940
- The House at Sea's End (Ruth Galloway,#3), 2010 novel by Elly Griffiths, dealing with a crime that occurred during the time of this film and that may be related to the events the film described

== Sources ==
- Houston, Penelope. Went the Day Well? London: BFI, 1992, ISBN 978-0-85170-318-3
