= Coal Face =

1935 British film by Alberto Cavalcanti

- Opening title card
- Directed by: Alberto Cavalcanti
- Written by: W.H. Auden
- Produced by: John Grierson
- Cinematography: Stuart Legg
- Edited by: William Coldstream
- Music by: Benjamin Britten
- Production company: GPO Film Unit
- Release date: 1935
- Running time: 11 minutes
- Country: United Kingdom
- Language: English

Coal Face is a 1935 British documentary film short directed by Alberto Cavalcanti.

== Synopsis ==
The film gives a glimpse into the lives of a Yorkshire mining community and the dangerous working conditions the miners routinely faced.

== Production ==
With a film score by Benjamin Britten and a poem written and narrated by W.H. Auden, the film largely reuses older footage from Tour of a British Coal Mine (1928), which was shot in Barnsley, Yorkshire.
