= Wings of Mercy =

- Title card
- Directed by: Evelyn Spice Cherry; Lawrence Cherry
- Written by: Evelyn Spice Cherry; Lawrence Cherry; Jim Wright (Research)
- Produced by: Evelyn Spice Cherry; Lawrence Cherry
- Narrated by: Tommy Tweed
- Cinematography: Lawrence Cherry; Walter A. Sutton (Credited as Wally Sutton); Clifford Griffin (Sound)
- Edited by: Victor Jobin
- Music by: Robert Fleming
- Production company: National Film Board of Canada
- Distributed by: National Film Board of Canada
- Release date: 1947
- Running time: 21 minutes
- Country: Canada
- Language: English

Wings of Mercy is a 21-minute 1947 Canadian documentary film made by the National Film Board of Canada (NFB), written, directed and produced by the team of Evelyn Spice Cherry and her husband, Lawrence. The film describes the formation and operational use of the Saskatchewan Air Ambulance service. The NFB production was later re-edited into a shorter, 11-minute film, Mercy Flight, released in 1948.

== Synopsis ==
In 1946, the fledgling Saskatchewan Air Ambulance Service became the first government-operated air ambulance service in the world. The initial operation had former Royal Canadian Air Force pilots flying a Noorduyn Norseman bush aircraft with a crew composed of a pilot, an engineer and a nurse. The aircraft could accommodate a stretcher and at least one other passenger. The Norseman could switch between wheels, floats and skis to deal with different terrains and seasons, which meant that it was often possible to airlift patients from difficult-to-reach locations. Shortly after flight operations began, a second Norseman was obtained, and later, a Fairchild Husky. The goal of 24-hour, year-round service was achieved within the first few years.

Transport from remote locations in Saskatchewan had previously relied on road and rail facilities, but often meant a long, uncomfortable and difficult trip over unprepared roadways. The air ambulance service, with its main base at Regina, could make the difference between life and death for a critical patient, serving to connect to thousands of residents in rural Saskatchewan and answer emergency calls over 160 million acres of farmland. A second base located at Prince Albert covered the northern region, dotted with waterways where logging camps and mining operations predominated.

From its dispatch centres, the aircraft were directed to ferry patients with pneumonia, tuberculosis, polio, perforated ulcers and heart failure, to name some of the cases that called for expedient transport to hospitals. Flying at 1,000 feet (300 m) altitude (or less) allowed patients to be carried without drastic changes in air pressure. When the patient was picked up, the pilot could radio ahead to ensure that an ambulance is waiting at the airport for rapid transport to a hospital in Regina, Saskatoon or Prince Albert. In the first month, 42 patients were evacuated, and in the first two years of service, 1,000 patients were flown to city hospitals.

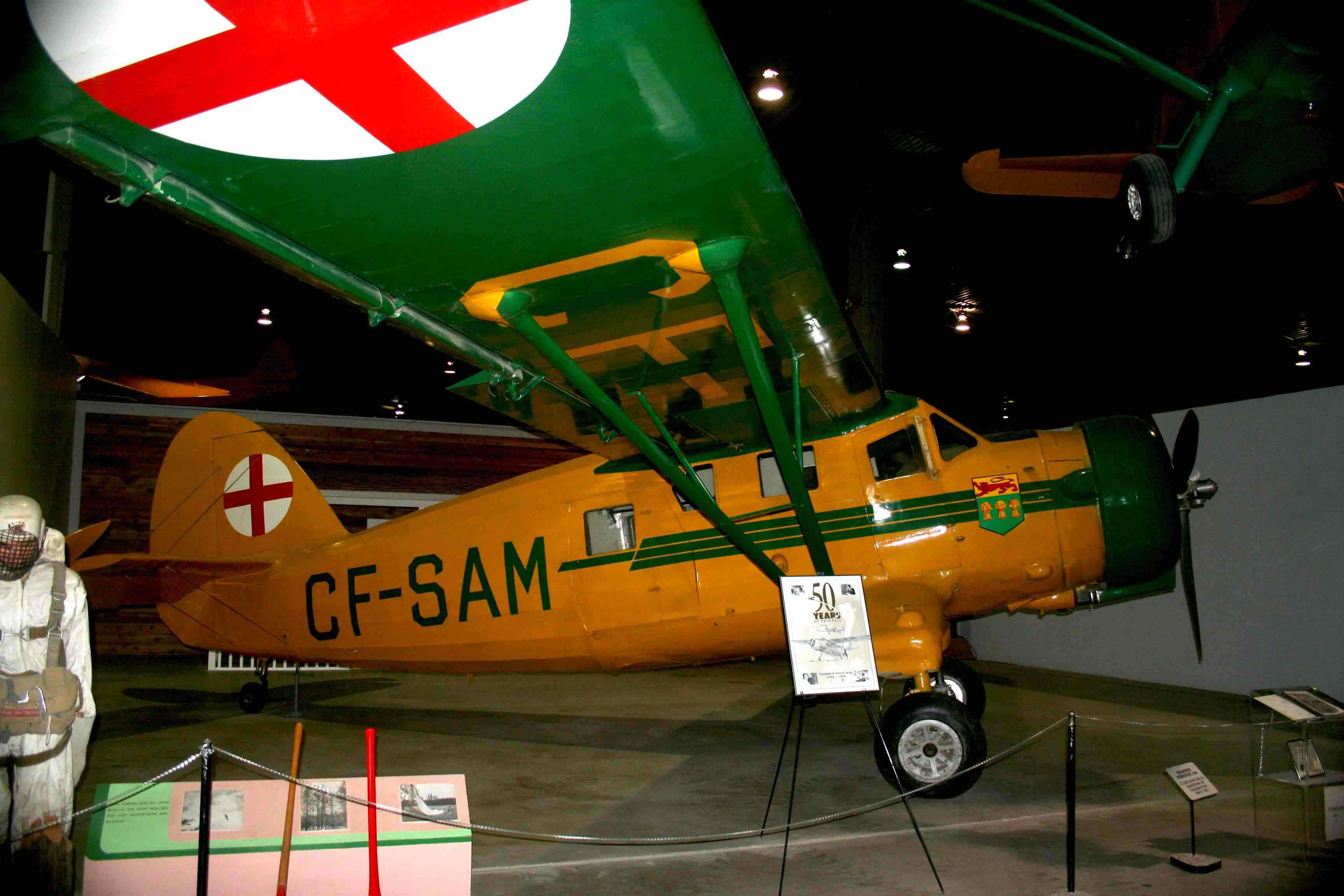
Noorduyn Norseman "CF-SAM" was featured in Wings of Mercy and was the first aircraft used by the Saskatchewan Air Ambulance; now at the Western Development Museum in Moose Jaw, Saskatchewan.

== Production ==
Typical of the NFB's postwar documentary short films, Wings of Mercy was based on an account of contemporary culture in rural Canada. The topic of Saskatchewan and rural life was especially important to filmmaker Evelyn Spice, who was born in 1904 in Yorkton, Saskatchewan. She began her career teaching public school, before becoming a filmmaker. She is best known for her work as the head of the Agricultural Films Unit at the National Film Board of Canada and her collaborative work with her husband, Lawrence Cherry, both as independent filmmakers and at the NFB.

On-location photography of Wings of Mercy, including aerial sequences, was completed by the camera crew of Lawrence Cherry and Wally Sutton, with sound editing by Clifford Griffin. The Cherry couple worked as a team, both being skilled cinematographers and editors, although Lawrence often worked best under his wife's direction. The film was made with the cooperation of the Department of Health, Province of Saskatchewan.

== Reception ==
Wings of Mercy was produced in 16 mm for the non-theatrical market by the NFB. Individual films were made available to schools, libraries, churches and factories, extending the life of these films for another year or two. They were also made available to film libraries operated by university and provincial authorities. (Note: The "cut-down version" Mercy Flight was released theatrically as part of the Canada Carries On theatrical series.)
