= Song of the Sea (1952 film) =

1952 film

- Directed by: Alberto Cavalcanti
- Written by: Hermilo Borba Filho; Alberto Cavalcanti; José Mauro de Vasconcelos
- Produced by: Alberto Cavalcanti
- Starring: Luiz Andrade
- Cinematography: Cyril Arapoff; Paolo Reale
- Edited by: José Cañizares
- Release date: 1952
- Running time: 124 minutes
- Country: Brazil
- Language: Portuguese

Song of the Sea (Portuguese: O Canto do Mar) is a 1952 Brazilian drama film directed by Alberto Cavalcanti and starring Luiz Andrade. It was entered into the 1954 Cannes Film Festival. Its poetic realist style incorporates elements of documentary and melodrama. The film depicts the migration of families away from drought in the north east of Brazil and their struggle for survival.

== Cast ==
- Luiz Andrade
- Glauce Bandeira
- Fernando Becker
- Débora Borba
- Margarida Cardoso
- Ernani Dantas
- Alfredo de Oliveira
- Aurora Duarte
- Cacilda Lanuza
- Antônio Martinelli
- Miriam Nunes
- Ruy Saraiva
- Alberto Vilar
- Maria do Carmo Xavier
