= Official Credit Institute =

Spanish lending institution

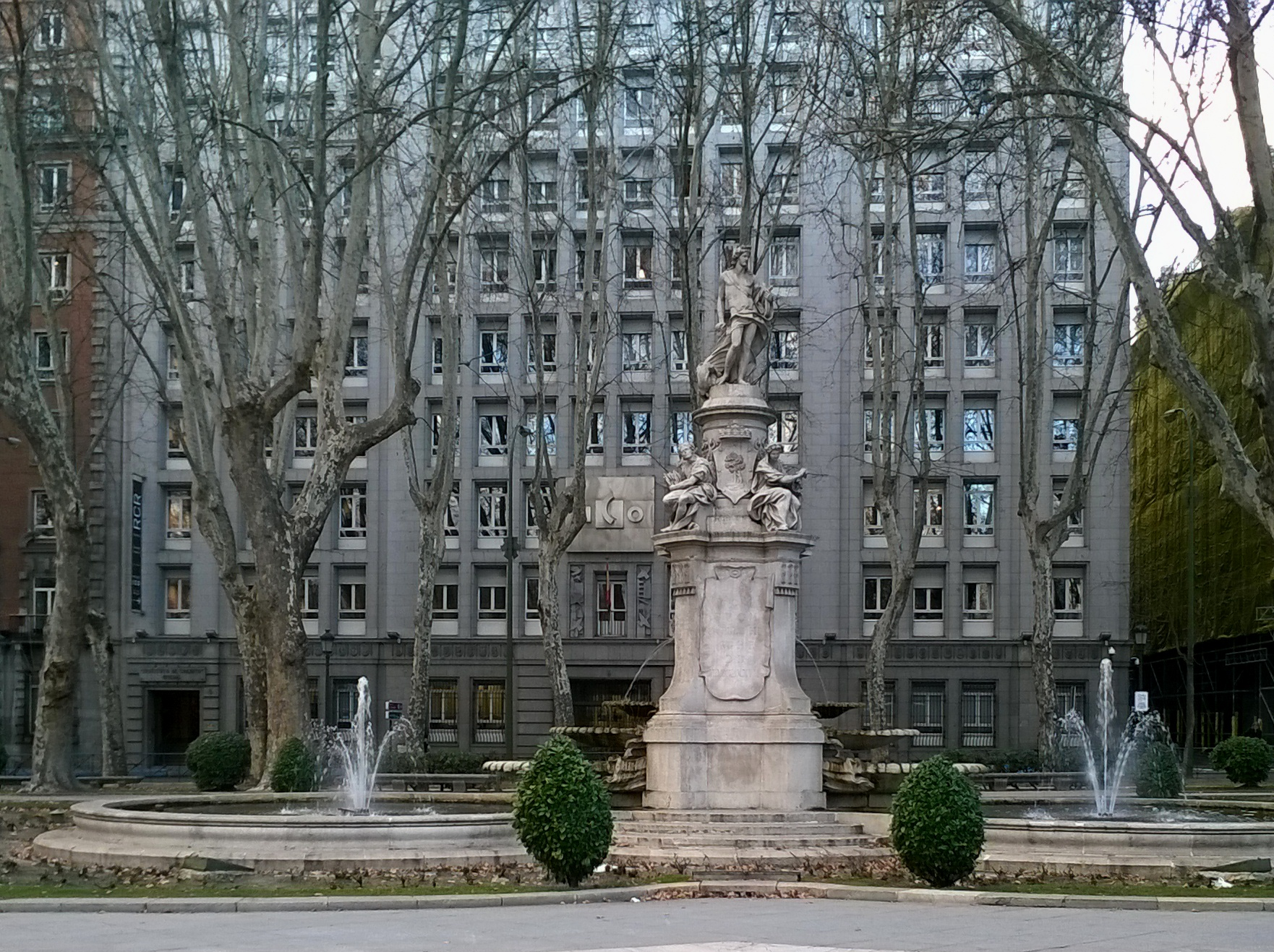
- ICO headquarters
- Founded: 1971
- Type: Public financial institution
- Location: Paseo del Prado 4, Madrid, Spain
- President: José Carlos García de Quevedo

The Official Credit Institute (Spanish: Instituto de Crédito Oficial, ICO) is a public credit institution in Spain. Its functions include funding investment projects and the assistance for the liquidity needs of Spanish companies. It also operates as State Financial Agency.

A successor to the Instituto de Crédito a Medio y Largo Plazo, the ICO was created in 1971 following the Matesa Scandal as public law entity (entidad de derecho público). Previously under the jurisdiction of the Ministry of Economy and Finance, it became a State company in 1989.

The bank is currently attached to the Ministry of Economic Affairs and Digital Transformation through the State Secretariat for the Economy and Business Support.

== Presidents ==
The presidents of the ICO are listed as follows:

- Rafael Bermejo Blanco (1978–1982)
- Miguel Martín Fernández (1982)
- Julián García Vargas (1982–1985)
- Miguel Muñiz de las Cuevas (1986–1995)
- Fernando Becker Zuazua (1996–1998)
- José Gasset Loring (1999–2000)
- Ramón Aguirre Rodríguez (2000–2003)
- Aurelio Martínez Estévez (2004–2009)
- José María Ayala Vargas (2009–2011)
- Román Escolano Olivares (2012–2014)
- Irene Garrido Valenzuela (2014–2015)
- Emma Navarro Aguilera (2015–2016)
- Pablo Zalba Bidegain (2016–2018)
- José Carlos García de Quevedo (since 2018)

== See also ==
- List of national development banks
- List of banks in Spain
