= Quentin Reynolds =

American journalist and war correspondent (1902–1965)

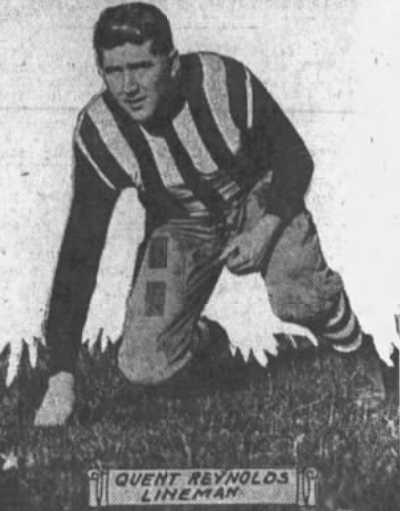
- Reynolds in 1926
- Born: Quentin James Reynolds; April 11, 1902; Bronx, New York, U.S.
- Died: March 17, 1965 (aged 62); Fairfield, California, U.S.
- Occupations: Journalist, WWII correspondent
- Years active: 1933–1963

Quentin James Reynolds (April 11, 1902 – March 17, 1965) was an American journalist and World War II war correspondent. He also played American football for one season in the National Football League (NFL) with the Brooklyn Lions.

== Early life and education ==
Reynolds was born on April 11, 1902, in The Bronx. He attended Manual Training High School in Brooklyn and Brown University. At Brown, he played college football as a tackle and starred as a breaststroker on the swimming team.

== Career ==
As an associate editor at Collier's Weekly from 1933 to 1945, Reynolds averaged 20 articles a year. He also published 25 books, including The Wounded Don't Cry, London Diary, Dress Rehearsal, and Courtroom, a biography of lawyer Samuel Leibowitz. His autobiography was titled By Quentin Reynolds.

During World War II, Reynolds was one of many Western correspondents noted for taking a pro-Soviet line. After visiting the USSR in the autumn of 1941, he argued that the victims of Stalin's purges in the 1930s had been guilty of treason to the Soviet Union, and attributed the country's survival in the face of Operation Barbarossa to the fact that before the war it had "eliminated Russia's Fifth Column." Reynolds was also misled by Soviet propaganda lauding Stalin as a battlefield commander, writing in 1942 that "there is no doubt that there is only one military genius in Russia -- Joseph Stalin."

After World War II, Reynolds was best known for his 1954 libel suit against right-wing Hearst columnist Westbrook Pegler, who in 1949 had accused him of habitually appearing naked in public, and called him "yellow" and an "absentee war correspondent". Reynolds, represented by noted attorney Louis Nizer, won $175,001 (approximately $1.9 million in 2022 dollars), at the time the largest libel judgment ever. The trial was later made into a Broadway play, A Case of Libel, which was twice adapted as TV movies.

In 1953, Reynolds was the victim of a major literary hoax when he published The Man Who Wouldn't Talk, the supposedly true story of a Canadian war hero, George Dupre, who claimed to have been captured and tortured by German soldiers. When the hoax was exposed, Bennett Cerf, of Random House, Reynolds's publisher, reclassified the book as fiction.

On December 8, 1950, Reynolds debuted as a television actor in "The Ponzi Story", an episode of Pulitzer Prize Playhouse. Reynolds was a personal friend of British media mogul Sidney Bernstein. In 1956, Reynolds paid a visit to England to co-host Meet the People, the launch night program for Manchester-based Granada Television (now ITV Granada) which Bernstein founded. Reynolds became inebriated before the broadcast and had to sober up.

Reynolds was a member of Delta Tau Delta International Fraternity.

== Death ==
Reynolds died of cancer, on March 17, 1965, at Travis Air Force Base Hospital in Fairfield, California.

== Books ==
- Parlor, Bedlam and Bath (with S. J. Perelman), Liveright, 1930
- The Wounded Don't Cry, E P Dutton, 1941
- A London Diary, Angus & Robertson, 1941
- Convoy, Random House, 1942
- Only the Stars are Neutral, Random House, 1942; Blue Ribbon Books, 1943
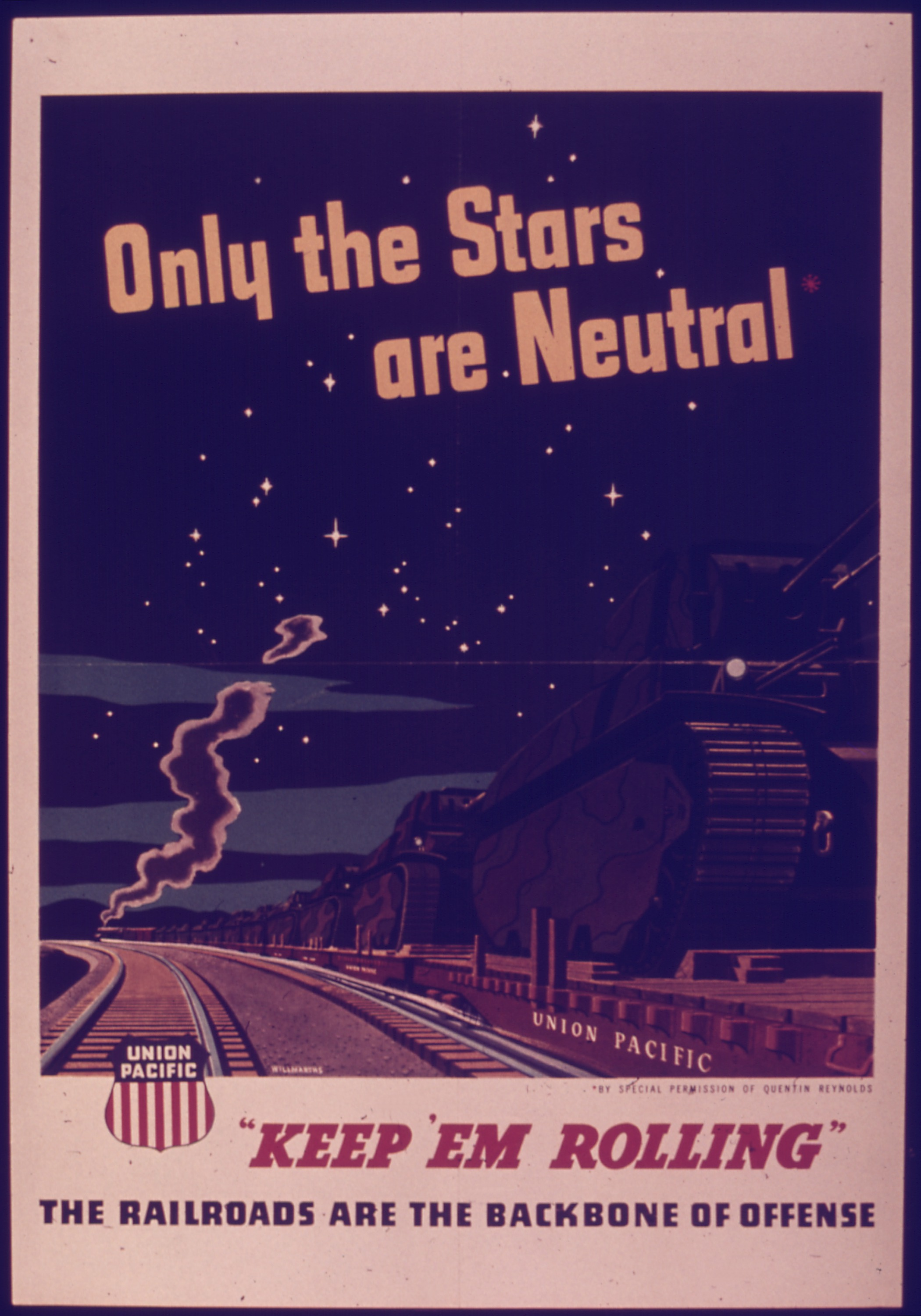
  World War II propaganda poster showing off the contributions of the Union Pacific Railroad, bearing the title of Reynolds 1942 book Only the Stars are Neutral. In small letters it notes "By special permission of Quentin Reynolds".
- Dress Rehearsal: The Story of Dieppe, Random House, 1943
- The Curtain Rises, Random House, 1944
- Officially Dead: The Story of Commander C D Smith, USN; The Prisoner the Japs Couldn’t Hold No. 511 Random House, 1945 (Published by Pyramid Books under the title He Came Back in multiple printings in the 1960s and early 1970s.)
- 70,000 to 1 (Seventy Thousand to One); True War Adventure, 1946
- Leave It to the People, Random House, 1948,1949
- The Wright Brothers, Pioneers of American Aviation, Random House Landmark Books, 1950
- Courtroom; The Story of Samuel S Leibowitz, Farrar, Straus and Co, 1950
- Custer's Last Stand, Random House, 1951
- The Battle of Britain, Random House, 1953
- The Amazing Mr Doolittle; A Biography of Lieutenant General James H Doolittle, Appleton-Century-Crofts, 1953
- The Man Who Wouldn't Talk, 1953
- I, Willie Sutton, Farrar, Straus and Young, 1953
- The FBI, Random House Landmark Books, 1954
- Headquarters, Harper & Brothers, 1955
- The Fiction Factory; or, From Pulp Row to Quality Street; The Story of 100 years of Publishing at Street & Smith, Random House 1955
- They Fought for the Sky; The Dramatic Story of the First War in the Air, Rinehart & Company, 1957
- Minister of Death: The Adolf Eichmann Story (by Zwy Aldouby and Quentin James Reynolds), Viking 1960
- Known But to God; The Story of the “Unknowns” of America’s War Memorials, John Day 1960
- Winston Churchill, Random House 1963
- By Quentin Reynolds, McGraw Hill, 1963
- Britain Can Take It! (based on the film)
- Don't Think It Hasn't Been Fun
- The Life of Saint Patrick
- Macapagal, the Incorruptible
- A Secret for Two
- With Fire and Sword; Great War Adventures

== Screenplays ==
- Call Northside 777 (1948)
- The Miracle of the Bells (1948)

== See also ==
- London Can Take It! (1940), narrated by Reynolds
- Christmas Under Fire (1941), written and narrated by Reynolds
- Nazi Eyes on Canada (1942)
- Reynolds v. Pegler
