= Jack Lambert (British actor) =

British actor (1899–1976)

- in Nine Men (1943)
- Born: John Lambert; 29 December 1899; Ardrossan, Ayrshire, UK
- Died: 13 March 1976 (aged 76); Wandsworth, London
- Years active: 1928–1974
- Spouse: Julia Wolfe (before 1976)
- Children: 1

Jack Lambert (29 December 1899 – 13 March 1976) was a Scottish actor who appeared on stage and screen from 1928 to 1974. After serving in the First World War he appeared in amateur productions before turning professional in 1930 and pursuing the career for the rest of his life, with a break during the Second World War, during which he served as an officer in the British army.

== Life and career ==
Lambert was born in Ardrossan, Ayrshire, on 29 December 1899, the son of John Lambert and his wife Mary, née Dyet. He was educated at Ardrossan Academy and the Royal Technical College, Glasgow. After the First World War, during which he served in the Royal Naval Volunteer Reserve, he appeared on stage as an amateur. In that capacity he appeared at the New Theatre, London in 1928 as Kenneth Dowey in a production of J. M. Barrie's The Old Lady Shows Her Medals, which won a national competition for amateur companies. The production was seen in New York and Montreal later in the year, winning the David Belasco Cup in the former. The company gave the play at the Lyric Theatre, Hammersmith in November 1929, which led to Lambert's first engagement for the professional stage.

Lambert's professional début was at Daly's Theatre in London on 17 March 1930, as Robert Pringle in the comedy A Song of Sixpence. His performance was well reviewed: The Stage said that he "played most effectively, with the driest of humour", and The Times commented, "Mr Jack Lambert, with a part that might easily have gone for little, builds up gradually a very clever portrait of an entertaining and interesting man".

At the Shaftesbury Theatre in September 1930 Lambert played the poet Ralston McTodd in a stage version of P. G. Wodehouse's Leave It to Psmith, directed by Frank Cellier, in a cast containing Reginald Gardiner, Jane Baxter, Joan Hickson and Aubrey Mather. During the 1930s Lambert appeared in eleven West End productions: Lieutenant Mackenzie in Who Goes Next? (1931), Robert Robertson in Make Up Your Mind (1931), Maclean in Tell Her the Truth (1932), Weelum Sprunt in Bunty Pulls the Strings (1933), McKenzie in Touch Wood (1934), Conway in Retreat from Folly (1937), Inspector Barrie in The Feud (1937), Angus in The Innocent Party (1938), Burkett in Windfall (1938), Porter in Johnson Over Jordan (1939), and Joris in Behold the Bride (1939).

During the Second World War Lambert served in the army, ending his service with the rank of Lieutenant-Colonel. His post-war stage roles included the Rev Leonard Clement in Agatha Christie's Murder at the Vicarage (1949), lnspector Warrilove in Noël Coward's Ace of Clubs (1950), Dr Watson in The Return of Sherlock Holmes (1953), Nicholas Parsons in Paul and Vanessa (1953), Peter Blake in A Question of Time (1953), Dr Anderson in Night Returns in Africa (1955), Dr Harris in Beware of Angels (1959), Superintendent Bossy in A Lodging for the Bride (1960), Hornbeam in Doctor at Sea (1961) and Sir Malcolm Reid in Lady Chatterley (1961).

Lambert died suddenly in London on 13 March 1976, survived by his widow, Julia, née Wolfe.

== Selected filmography ==
- A Honeymoon Adventure (1931) – Chauffeur
- Sorrell and Son (1933) – (uncredited)
- Red Ensign (1934) – Police Inspector (uncredited)
- The Ghost Goes West (1935) – Son of MacLaggen (uncredited)
- House Broken (1936) – Jock Macgregor
- The Last Adventurers (1937) – (uncredited)
- Premiere (1938) – Stage Manager
- Thistledown (1938) – (uncredited)
- The Terror (1938) – Warder Joyce (uncredited)
- Marigold (1938) – Minor Role (uncredited)
- The Outsider (1939) – (uncredited)
- The Spy in Black (1939) – Passport Official (uncredited)
- The Four Feathers (1939) – (uncredited)
- Goodbye, Mr. Chips (1939) – Padre (uncredited)
- The Spider (1940) – Smith
- Nine Men (1943) – Sergeant Watson
- The Captive Heart (1946) – Padre
- Meet Me at Dawn (1947) – Minor Role (uncredited)
- Dear Murderer (1947) – (uncredited)
- The Brothers (1947) – (uncredited)
- Hue and Cry
- Captive Heart
- Eureka Stockade (1949) – Commissioner Rede (Note: Lambert went to Australia in 1948 to make Eureka Stockade. In 2025 the Australian Filmink magazine was uncomplimentary about the entire cast, and called Lambert "an utterly non-famous and non-exciting actor who [sic], for some reason, Ealing decided to import all the way from Britain to play a lead role".)
- Floodtide (1949) – Anstruther
- Hunted (1952) – (uncredited)
- The Lost Hours (1952) – John Parker
- The Great Game (1953) – Ralph Blake
- Twice Upon a Time (1953) – Ernest (uncredited)
- The Master of Ballantrae (1953) – (uncredited)
- Front Page Story (1954) – (uncredited)
- The Sea Shall Not Have Them (1954) – Squadron Leader Craig
- Companions in Crime (1954)
- Three Cases of Murder (1955) – Inspector Acheson ("You Killed Elizabeth" segment)
- Out of the Clouds (1955) – Chief Engineer
- The Dark Avenger (1955) – Dubois
- Track the Man Down (1955) – Dr. Jameson (uncredited)
- Cross Channel (1955) – Detective Sergeant Burroughs
- Storm Over the Nile (1955) – Colonel
- Lost (1956) – Police Station Sergeant (uncredited)
- Jumping for Joy (1956) – Clinton (uncredited)
- Reach for the Sky (1956) – Adrian Stoop (uncredited)
- The Last Man to Hang? (1956) – Maj. Forth
- X the Unknown (1956) – Police Sergeant (uncredited)
- Mr. Adams and Eve (1957) – Cyril (Episode "The Torn-Shirt School of Acting")
- The Little Hut (1957) – Capt. MacWalt
- The Son of Robin Hood (1958) – Will Scarlett
- The Bridal Path (1959) – Hector
- The Devil's Disciple (1959) – (uncredited)
- The Shakedown (1960) – Sgt. Kershaw
- Francis of Assisi (1961) – Scefi
- Greyfriars Bobby (1961) – Doctor
- On the Fiddle (1961) – Police Constable
- Bomb in the High Street (1963) – Sergeant
- A Shot in the Dark (1964) – Man (uncredited)
- Dracula: Prince of Darkness (1966) – Brother Peter
- Modesty Blaise (1966) – (uncredited)
- "Miss MacTaggart Won't Lie Down" (1966) – Lord Longbrae
- They Came From Beyond Space (1967) – Doctor – Office
- Cuckoo Patrol (1967) – Police Inspector
- Kidnapped (1971) – Aged Highlander
- Special Branch (1974) – John Miller

== Notes, references and sources ==
=== Sources ===
- Herbert, Ian, ed. (1977). Who's Who in the Theatre (sixteenth ed.). London and Detroit: Pitman Publishing and Gale Research. ISBN 978-0-273-00163-8.
