= Evelyn Spice Cherry =

Canadian screenwriter and filmmaker

- Evelyn Spice Cherry, c. 1940
- Born: 1906; Yorkton, Saskatchewan, Canada
- Died: 1990 (aged 83–84); Victoria, British Columbia, Canada
- Other name: Evelyn Spice
- Education: University of Missouri
- Occupations: Filmmaker, Teacher. Journalist
- Known for: Filmmaking, Teaching
- Spouse: Lawrence Cherry

Evelyn Spice Cherry (née Evelyn Spice) was a Canadian documentary filmmaker, director, and producer. She is best known for her work as the head of the Agricultural Films Unit at the National Film Board of Canada and as a member of the British Documentary Film Movement.

== Early life ==
Evelyn Spice was born in 1904 in Yorkton, Saskatchewan. She began her career teaching public school. In 1929, she graduated from the University of Missouri with a degree in journalism and started working at the Regina Leader-Post as the society columnist.

Spice moved to London, England in 1931, where she began working at the Government Post Film Unit. (Note: Grierson was so impressed with Weather Forecast. her first amateur effort at filmmaking that he offered her a job at the GPO Film Unit.) She worked under John Grierson, whom she would later go on to work with at the National Film Board of Canada (NFB) in Canada. While working at the GPO, Spice met and worked with members of the British Documentary Film Movement. She became the only Canadian and the only woman in the movement.

While in England, Spice met her fellow Canadian and future film making partner and husband, Lawrence Cherry. In 1939, after the Second World War was declared, Evelyn and Lawrence returned to Canada, where they worked as independent film makers. The couple worked as a team, both being skilled cinematographers and editors, although Lawrence often worked best under his wife's direction.

== Career ==
=== Work at the National Film Commission/Board ===
In 1941, Grierson invited Cherry and her husband to join the newly formed National Film Commission, later renamed the National Film Board. Cherry was placed in charge of the agricultural film unit, where she made films about farm life and food production. Cherry’s accession to such a high position in the NFB was unheard of at the time and is attributable to the scarcity of available talented filmmakers after the outbreak of the Second World War. Nonetheless, her work was highly influential and Cherry is regarded as a pioneer in the Canadian female documentary filmmaker movement. Cherry made 128 films at the NFB during her 10-year tenure.

Since the NFB had been formed in part to create Canadian propaganda for the war effort, many of Cherry’s films revolved around a central theme of cooperation and coming together to achieve a unified goal. Farm Electrification (1946), for example, is a film that centres on a rural Manitoba community that comes together to bring hydroelectricity to their farms. Those in the community who oppose the plan are eventually won over, recognizing that the wide-reaching benefits outweigh the costs. Similarly, her film Children First (1944) spoke to the importance of organized consumption and assures the audience that sharing guarantees that “there will be enough to go around.” These “waste not, want not” messages were abundant in NFB films throughout the 1940s, but would go on to cost Cherry and many others at the NFB their jobs after the war, as post-World War II communist paranoia surrounded the NFB and other government agencies.

=== The "Red Scare" ===
Cherry left the National Film Board during the "Red Scare" — an epidemic fear that communist operatives had infiltrated branches of Canadian government offices and institutions after the Second World War. These fears were somewhat bolstered when Igor Gouzenko, a cipher clerk for the Soviet Embassy to Canada, defected to Canada and brought with him evidence of espionage. Among the evidence was a document that read "Freda to the Professor through Grierson." This document was thought to be implicating John Grierson, the man who hired Cherry at the NFB, and his former secretary Freda. As such, Cherry and her husband, along with many others from the NFB, were let go and John Grierson's contract as NFB commissioner was not renewed.

Although Cherry herself was never directly linked to any communist activities, the government saw potential communist themes in her work, before and during her time at the NFB. As head of the Agricultural Films Unit, many of her films portrayed the working class in an exemplary light. Her film Children First, for example, advocated for consumption patterns in relation to societal needs. These messages of social consciousness and praise for the working class were necessary to the war effort, but were seen as potentially detrimental to capitalist society afterwards. Cherry herself acknowledged the politically motivated purging of the socially aware documentary film makers from the NFB:

The basic thing was an attack on the kind of film – of social meaning – we were doing. We felt deeply involved in the county and we were filming it. Canadians were seeing themselves and their country for the first time, and they liked it. We were a threat to the way things were and the way some people wanted them to continue. In the U.S. there were a few people doing it, but up here it was a movement – the National Film Board!

— Evelyn Spice Cherry

=== Life after the NFB ===
After leaving the National Film Board, Cherry retired from filmmaking, albeit temporarily, returning to her earlier work as a teacher. Cherry and her husband raised a family together and, in 1960, the couple got back into film making in Saskatchewan to form Cherry Films Ltd, where they made more socially and environmentally conscious films. Lawrence died in 1966. Cherry finally retired from filmmaking in 1985, when she moved to British Columbia. She died in Victoria in 1990.

== Partial filmography ==
Title	Year	Credited As
New Horizons	1943	Director
Windbreaks on the Prairies	1943	Director/Writer/Editor/Producer
Children First	1944	Director
Soil for Tomorrow	1945	Director
Farm Electrification	1946	Director/Producer
Wings of Mercy	1947	Director/Producer

== Archives ==
There is an Evelyn and Lawrence Cherry fonds at Library and Archives Canada. The archival reference number is R5268, former archival reference MG31-D173. The fonds covers the date range 1860 to 1988. It consists of 9.11 meters of textual records, 876 photographs and a number of other media records.
