= For Those in Peril (1944 film) =

- UK release poster
- Directed by: Charles Crichton
- Written by: Harry Watt; J. O. C. Orton; T. E. B. Clarke
- Based on: short story by Richard Hillary
- Produced by: Michael Balcon
- Starring: David Farrar; Ralph Michael
- Cinematography: Douglas Slocombe
- Edited by: Sidney Cole
- Music by: Gordon Jacob
- Production company: Ealing Studios
- Release date: June 1944
- Running time: 77 min. (66 min. and 64 min. edited for home media release)
- Country: United Kingdom
- Language: English

For Those in Peril is a 1944 British war film produced by Ealing Studios that marked the directorial debut of Charles Crichton. The film was developed from a short story by Richard Hillary, an RAF pilot killed in action in January 1943. The basic and relatively slight storyline of For Those in Peril was an end to produce a film with a documentary feel and an element of wartime propaganda. The film stars Ralph Michael and David Farrar.

The title is taken from the maritime hymn Eternal Father, Strong to Save: Oh hear us when we pray to thee, for those in peril on the sea.

The film is cut with many sections of true life footage of the motor launches in action.

== Plot ==
During the Second World War a fighter pilot bails out over the English Channel. Lost in the vast sea he floats but is unaided. A lifeboat is launched to rescue the pilot but fails to find him in time, and observers on the Sussex coast near Beachy Head note that it is too late and the pilot has drowned.

We are then introduced to various characters on a coastal air sea rescue base on the Sussex coast.

Aspiring RAF pilot Pilot Officer Rawlings (Ralph Michael) has failed to make the grade in training as a mainstream pilot and grudgingly accepts the alternative of joining the crew of Launch 183 (which the crew call Sally), an air-sea rescue craft skippered by Flight Lieutenant Murray (David Farrar). Rawlings is initially resentful and bored by the apparent mundane and unexciting life, until the vessel is called on to rescue the three-man crew of an RAF bomber shot down in mid-Channel, in a small rubber dinghy in the fog. The three survivors encounter a German trawler, Konigin, in the fog and are keen not to be seen. The fog clears and the three men send up a kite. They are spotted by a Supermarine Walrus seaplane. They try to warn it not to land as there are mines in the water, but they are too late. The men paddle themselves out of the minefield.

At the point where the two launches (134 and 183) spot the men the German trawler reappears. It has a mounted gun on the front and a battle commences. HSL 134 is hit. The larger naval vessel RML 529 arrives and provides enough fire power to scare the Germans off. 183 rescues the men and takes 134 on tow.

Having accomplished the rescue, the boat runs into an enemy minefield and is also then attacked by German fighters. When Murray is killed, Rawlings has to take charge and bring the vessel back. 134 is in trouble but everyone transfers to 183. RML 518 escorts them home.

== Cast ==
- David Farrar as Flight Lieutenant Murray
- Ralph Michael as Pilot Officer Rawlings
- Robert Wyndham as Squadron Leader Leverett
- John Slater as Aircraftman 1st Class Wilkie
- Robert Griffith as Coxswain
- John Batten as Wireless Officer
- Tony Bazell as Lieutenant Overton (credited as Anthony Bazell)
- Peter Arne as Junior Officer
- Leslie Clarke as Aircraftman 1st Class Pearson
- James Robertson Justice as Operations Room Officer (uncredited) (Note: For Those in Peril was the first screen appearance for James Robertson Justice.)
- F/O Geoffrey Lockwood DSC, a serving ASR boat commander (HSL156) appears in a cameo role in the officers mess

== Production ==
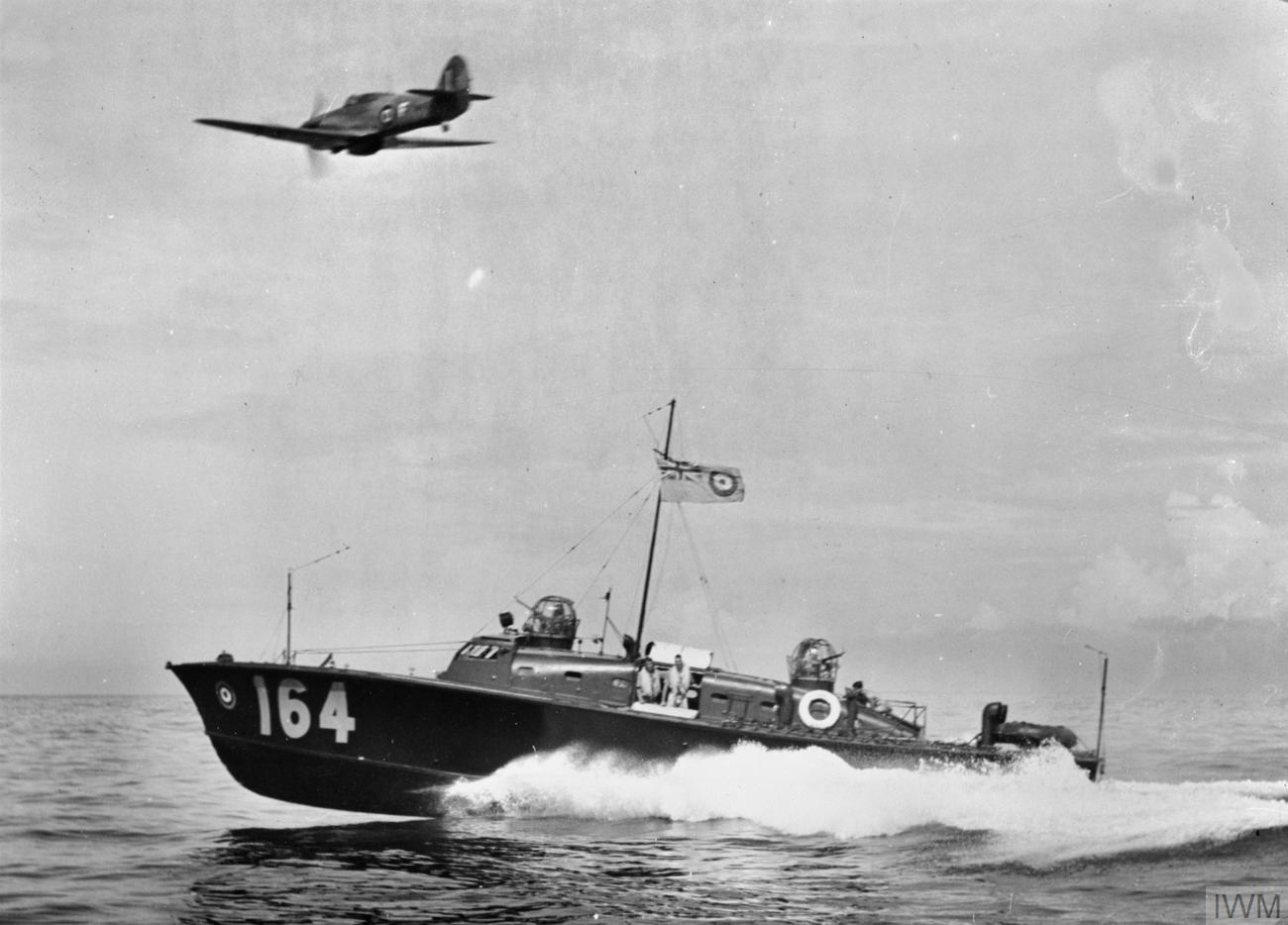
Crash rescue boat of the Air Sea Rescue Service

For Those in Peril was designed to publicise a little-known unit of the Royal Air Force, the Air Sea Rescue Unit, which was set up in 1941 to save those in distress at sea, particularly airmen who had been shot down or forced to ditch in the water. In common with a number of other war-related films made by Ealing at this time, the plot was subservient to the propaganda message; name actors were generally not used and genuine sailors featured in the action scenes.

Location filming took place mainly in the area around the port of Newhaven in Sussex, with the English Channel sequences being shot off the Sussex coast. Crichton later recalled: "(My) first picture ... was a propaganda picture called For Those in Peril where we rushed around the Channel in high speed motorboats, boats which were used for picking up crashed airmen and so on. It's a horrifying thing to say, but it was very exciting".

Principal photography took place in mid-1943 at the Ealing studios and on location, with the participation of the Admiralty and Royal Navy in filming. Royal Navy Patrol Service (RNPS) armed trawlers and other auxiliary craft, together with Royal Navy coastal craft (motor launches and torpedo boats) from HMS Aggressive, Shoreham, were made available. A Royal Air Force Supermarine Walrus air-sea rescue aircraft of No. 28 Air Sea Rescue unit and a Douglas DB-7 Boston bomber were also featured.

== Reception ==
For Those in Peril was one of the few British productions that appeared in 1944–1945. Its semi-documentary style suited its role as a propaganda film. Film historian George Perry considered this film to be the closest Charles Crichton ever got to "documentary realism during his long Ealing career".
