= Fernando Becker =

Spanish economist and politician (born 1955)

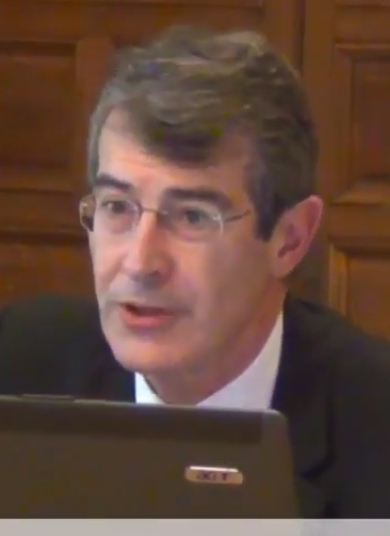
- Becker en 2012
- Born: 1955; León
- Education: Autonomous University of Madrid
- Employer: King Juan Carlos University (1999–)

Fernando Becker Zuazúa (born 1955) is a Spanish economist, executive, professor and politician. He has served as minister of Economy and Finance of the Junta of Castile and León (1991–1995) and as President of the Official Credit Institute (1996–1999).

== Biography ==
Born in León on 30 July 1955, he studied at the Jesuit school of the former city, at the same centre as Mariano Rajoy, whom he shares an acquaintance with. He is the son-in-law of Carlos Robles Piquer. He earned a licentiate degree and a PhD in Economics from the Autonomous University of Madrid (UAM). He worked for a time as assistant lecturer at the UAM, where he collaborated with Ramón Tamames.

In 1991, he was appointed as regional minister of Economy and Finance of the Junta of Castile and León, in a regional cabinet presided by Juan José Lucas. He left office in 1995, after the regional election, in which he had been elected member of the Cortes of Castile and León in representation of the constituency of León, running in the list of the People's Party (PP).

He was elected member of the Senate in representation of the province of León at the 1996 general election, yet he renounced to his seat in that year. He served then as President of the Official Credit Institute until 1999. From the on, and until February 2018, he worked for Iberdrola, an energy company he entered as chief financial officer and left when he was serving as corporate executive officer.

Since 1999 he is also professor of Applied Economics at the King Juan Carlos University.
