= London Can Take It! =

- Directed by: Humphrey Jennings; Harry Watt
- Edited by: Stewart McAllister (uncredited)
- Production company: GPO Film Unit
- Distributed by: Warner Bros.
- Release date: November 1940
- Running time: 9 minutes
- Country: United Kingdom
- Language: English

London Can Take It! is a 1940 short British propaganda film directed by Humphrey Jennings and Harry Watt and narrated by US journalist and war correspondent Quentin Reynolds. It was produced by the GPO Film Unit for the British Ministry of Information and distributed throughout the United States by Warner Bros. The film shows the effects of eighteen hours of the German blitz on London and its people.

== Plot ==
The film opens with shots of the London streets in late afternoon, as people begin their commute home. The narrator reminds the audience that these people are part of the greatest civilian army the world has ever known, and are going to join their respective service before London's "nightly visitor" arrives. Listening posts are stationed as far away as the coastline and the "white fingers" of searchlights touch the sky.

Soon the Luftwaffe bombers arrive and begin their nightly work, bombing churches, places of business and homes, the work of five centuries destroyed in five seconds. But as soon as it is morning the British people go back to work the way they usually do, demonstrating the British 'stiff upper lip' attitude. Joseph Goebbels is quoted as saying that the bombings are having a great effect on British morale. He is right, the narrator says, the British people's morale is higher than ever.

== Release ==
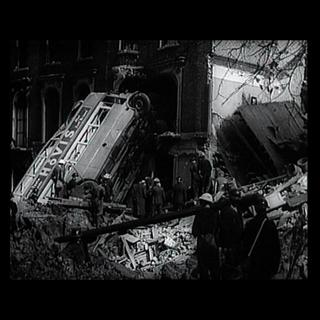
Scene from Britain Can Take It, the Oscar-nominated, edited US version of London Can Take It!

Via an agreement with Warner Bros., the film was widely distributed in the United States of America by the British Ministry of Information with the intention of turning public opinion into favouring the US declaring war on Germany. It did so particularly by depicting the war's effect on ordinary people, rather than on Britain as an outdated imperial power as she was often depicted by anti-war voices in America. A shorter domestic version was released as Britain Can Take It.

== Reception ==
Variety wrote: "Variety's rule of not reviewing shorts is abrogated in this case in deference to the job done by the British Ministry of Information, Quentin Reynolds and Warner Bros. English propaganda service did its bit in conceiving the idea of London Can Take It; Reynolds did his – and more – by making it both impressive and presentable to the American public via his excellently written and spoken commentary, and Warner Bros did theirs by releasing it to theatres throughout the country as rapidly as prints could be turned out. ... It's skillfully edited by some unsung and unbilled expert to interlard scenes of bombings and air-raid shelters with those of London going about its normal business. ... Reynolds' story is told with no fancy verbiage, no hysterical language, but with powerful simplicity."

The Hollywood Reporter wrote: "London Can Take It, a one-reel documentary of a single day in that war-torn city, is an eloquent testament to the courage of British people. It is one of the greatest human interest stories to appear so far, either on film or in type. It has scenes of war, but is not a war film; it has scenes of wanton destruction, but is not a horror film. It is a matter-of-fact recording of the way the people and city of London are reacting to Hitler's nightly bombing and firing on children, hospitals and churches under cover of darkness in hope of terrorizing them and destroying public morale."

Boxoffice wrote: "In terms of brooding and tragic photography, immeasurably aided and heightened by the factual, yet stirring, commentary of Quentin Reynolds, war correspondent for Collier's, London Can Take It might be described as a saga of a modern city under brutal and unrelenting attack from the air. ... Tremendously worthwhile and highly dramatic".

== Accolades ==
The film was nominated for an Academy Award in 1941 for Best Live Action Short Film, One-Reel.

== In popular culture ==
The film is edited and set to music by Public Service Broadcasting as one of the songs on their War Room EP.

In 2025, the memoir London Can Take It by Valerie Braunston was published about growing up in the capital city during the Blitz which includes several references to Londoners having little option but to 'take it'.

== See also ==
- List of Allied propaganda films of World War II
