= Ramón Aguirre Rodríguez =

Spanish politician (born 1953)

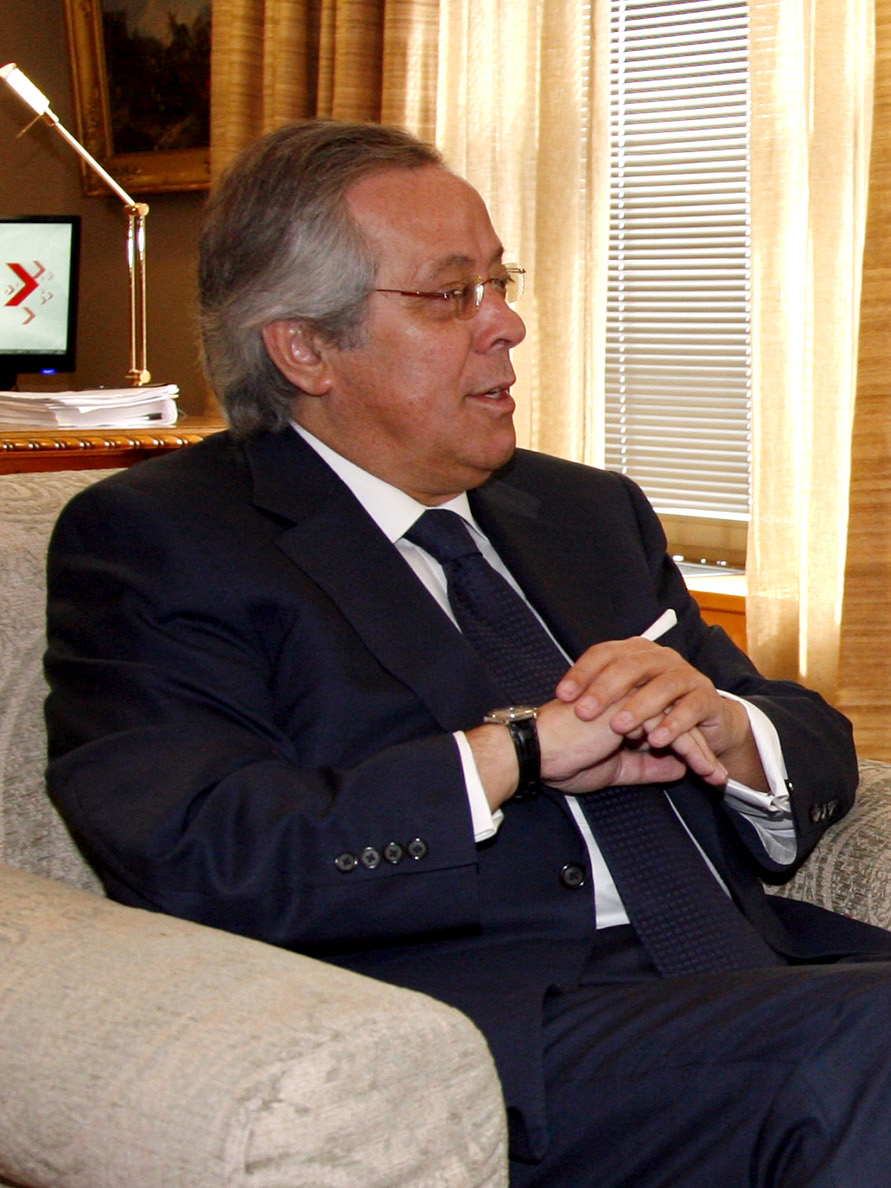
A portrait of Ramón Aguirre Rodríguez

Ramón Aguirre Rodríguez (born 3 March 1953 in Madrid, Spain) is a Spanish politician who belongs to the People's Party (PP).

Aguirre worked as a bank director and later served as Vice-secretary General of the Popular Alliance (AP). In 1989 the AP merged with other parties to form the current PP and in that year Aguirre was elected to the Spanish Congress of Deputies representing Caceres Province and headed the PP list at several elections being re-elected in 1993, 1996 and 2000. However, in the latter year he resigned after being appointed President of the Official Credit Institute (Instituto de Crédito Oficial/ICO) in July 2000. Consequently, the local PP branch in Caceres deselected him for the 2004 election. For the 2008 election he changed districts and was elected for Guadalajara Province as head of the PP list.

In Congress he has served as President of the Commission of Commerce and Tourism and PP spokesman in the Commission of Economics, Commerce and Manufacturing.

He is married with one daughter.
