= Harry Watt =

Scottish documentary and feature film director (1906–1987)

- Born: 18 October 1906; Edinburgh, Scotland
- Died: 2 April 1987 (aged 80); Amersham, Buckinghamshire
- Occupations: documentary and film director, producer, writer

Raymond Egerton Harry Watt (18 October 1906 – 2 April 1987) was a Scottish documentary and feature film director who began his career working for John Grierson and Robert Flaherty.

His 1959 film The Siege of Pinchgut was entered into the 9th Berlin International Film Festival.

== Biography ==
He was born in Edinburgh, the son of the Scottish Liberal MP Harry Watt. He studied at Edinburgh University but failed to complete his degree. He enlisted in the Merchant Navy and worked in a number of industrial jobs.

=== Documentaries ===
In 1932, Watt joined the Empire Marketing Board Film Unit under John Grierson and began working on documentaries. He was an assistant on Man of Aran (1934).

In 1936 Watt became a director for the London unit of the American newsreel series March of Time, where his films included England's Tithe War (1936).

Watt then joined the GPO Film Unit where he made his reputation as a documentarian with Night Mail (1936), which received much acclaim. He followed it with The Saving of Bill Blewitt (1936), starring Bill Blewitt, who then appeared in Watt's North Sea (1938).

World War II saw Watt make war-themed films: Squadron 992 (1940), London Can Take It! (1940) and Christmas Under Fire (1941). His film Target for Tonight (1941) won an honorary Academy Award in 1942.

=== Features ===
Watt made his feature debut with Nine Men (1943), a war movie produced by Michael Balcon. He helped write For Those in Peril and followed this with a comedy, Fiddlers Three (1944), starring Tommy Trinder.

Balcon sent Watt to Australia to find a subject for the film. The result was The Overlanders (1946), which was a big hit and helped make a star of Chips Rafferty. It inspired Ealing to set up production in Australia. However the follow-up, Eureka Stockade (1949), was not a success.

Watt went to East Africa on a similar mission to the one he had for The Overlanders – travel around the country and find a subject for a film. He came up with Where No Vultures Fly (1951), which was another big hit. It led to a less successful sequel, West of Zanzibar (1954).

Watt worked as a producer for Granada Television from 1955 to 1956.

He returned to Australia for The Siege of Pinchgut (1959). He directed some television shows like The Four Just Men (1959–60).

He died in Amersham, Buckinghamshire.

== Selected filmography ==
- Night Mail (1936)
- The Saving of Bill Blewitt (1937)
- North Sea (1938)
- Squadron 992 (1939)
- The First Days (1939)
- Dover Front Line (1940)
- London Can Take It! (1940)
- Christmas Under Fire (1941)
- Target for Tonight (1941)
- Nine Men (1943)
- Fiddlers Three (1944)
- The Overlanders (1946)
- Eureka Stockade (1949)
- Where No Vultures Fly (1951)
- West of Zanzibar (1954)
- The Siege of Pinchgut (1959)
