= Nine Men (film) =

1943 film

- UK release poster
- Directed by: Harry Watt
- Written by: Harry Watt
- Based on: Umpity Poo (short story) by Gerald Kersh
- Produced by: Michael Balcon
- Starring: Jack Lambert; Gordon Jackson; Frederick Piper
- Cinematography: Roy Kellino
- Edited by: Charles Crichton
- Music by: John Greenwood
- Distributed by: Ealing Studios
- Release date: 22 February 1943
- Running time: 68 min.
- Country: United Kingdom
- Language: English
- Budget: £20,000

Nine Men is a 1943 British war film, set in the Western Desert Campaign during the Second World War.

== Production ==
The film is an Ealing Studios production and marked the first fiction film assignment for celebrated documentary film director Harry Watt, who had worked at the Crown Film Unit. With only a £20,000 budget, the film's exterior desert sequences were shot at Margam Sands, Glamorgan.

== Plot ==
In a barrack room at a Battle Training Ground in England, a platoon of conscripts are complaining about blisters and are impatient to get into action with the enemy. Sergeant Jack Watson tells them that they need a little bit extra to be successful in combat, which he illustrates with a story from his experience in the Western Desert Campaign.

His story is then shown in flashback. Lieutenant Crawford, Sergeant Watson and the seven men under their command are travelling through the Libyan Desert in an Allied convoy, when their lorry becomes stuck in the sand and the convoy moves on without them. As they work to free themselves, they are attacked by German aircraft, injuring Crawford and Johnson and setting fire to the lorry. Setting off on foot and carrying the wounded, they struggle through a sandstorm until they come across a derelict hut. Lieutenant Crawford orders them to hold out there until help arrives but then dies. With only a limited supply of ammunition and their own wits to help them survive, they are then besieged by Italian troops. By various ruses and skilful use of their weapons, they are able to hold out until the Italians make a final assault; as the British soldiers use the last of their bullets and finally resort to a bayonet charge, reinforcements arrive supported by tanks, whereupon the Italians surrender.

Back at the barrack room, Watson concludes his story as the bugle sounds for dinner.

== Cast ==
In common with many Ealing productions of the time, the film used a largely unknown cast, only a few of whom were full-time professional actors. The film is known to be actor Grant Sutherland's last performance before retiring from acting to pursue a career in business. Sutherland had featured in such films as Michael Powell's The Edge of the World and The Spy in Black.

- Jack Lambert as Sergeant Jack Watson
- Gordon Jackson as The Young'un
- Frederick Piper as 'Banger' Hill
- Grant Sutherland as Jock Scott
- Bill Blewitt as Bill Parker
- Eric Micklewood as 'Bookie' Lee
- John Varley as 'Dusty' Johnstone
- Jack Horsman as Joe Harvey
- Richard Wilkinson as 2nd Lieutenant Crawford
- Giulio Finzi as Italian mechanic
- Fred Griffiths as Base sergeant

== Reception ==
Although the battle scenes were considered to be effective and particularly graphic at the time, the portrayal of the Italian soldiers was described by the Manchester Guardian as "impossibly instead of credibly cowardly".

However the Yorkshire Post and Leeds Intelligencer of Wednesday 27 January 1943 describes the film thus "This is a fine picture, uncompromisingly realistic, full of sand, sweat and endurance. Major Jack Lambert, the Scottish actor, a veteran of the last war, plays the sergeant. Most of the other leading players are also professional actors, but many ordinary soldiers take part in the film, and one of the " nine" is Sergeant Jack Horsman. He is the young Durham soldier who escaped from Dunkirk across France to Spain, and was invalided, out of the Army last year owing to hurts suffered in Spanish prisons."
