= Charles Crichton =

English filmmaker and editor (1910–1999)

- Crichton in 1988
- Born: Charles Ainslie Crichton; 6 August 1910; Wallasey, Cheshire, England
- Died: 14 September 1999 (aged 89); South Kensington, London, England
- Occupations: film director film editor
- Years active: 1931–1988

Charles Ainslie Crichton (6 August 1910 – 14 September 1999) was an English film director and editor.

Born in Wallasey, Cheshire, he became best known for directing many comedies produced at Ealing Studios and had a 40-year career editing and directing many films and television programmes. For his final film, the acclaimed comedy A Fish Called Wanda (1988), Crichton was nominated for both the Academy Award for Best Director and the Academy Award for Best Original Screenplay (along with the film's star John Cleese).

== Life and career ==
=== Early years and education ===
Crichton, one of six children, was born on 6 August 1910 in Wallasey, Cheshire, England. He was educated at Oundle School in Northamptonshire, followed by New College at the University of Oxford where he read history.

=== Editing ===
In 1931, Crichton began his career in the film industry as a film editor. His first credit as editor was Men of Tomorrow (1932). He edited over fifty films, such as Things to Come (1936). Other films he edited included those that were produced by Alexander Korda, such as Cash (1933), The Girl from Maxim's (1933), The Private Life of Henry VIII (1933), Sanders of the River (1935), Elephant Boy (1937) and The Thief of Bagdad (1940). Crichton was paid £8 per week for his editing. In 1940, Crichton began his employment at Ealing Studios. There he edited the film, The Big Blockade (1942). Crichton also served as an associate producer of the film, Nine Men (1943), which he also edited.

=== Directing ===
Crichton made his directorial debut with For Those in Peril (1944). In 1945, he directed Painted Boats and co-directed a segment in Dead of Night. Crichton then directed Hue and Cry (1947), a film considered to be the first comedy released by Ealing Studios. Crichton later directed Against the Wind (1948) and Dance Hall (1950). Crichton then directed Alec Guinness in The Lavender Hill Mob (1951). This was followed by Hunted (1952), starring Dirk Bogarde. Afterwards, Crichton directed The Titfield Thunderbolt (1953). Later films he directed during the 1950s included The Divided Heart (1954), Law and Disorder (1958), and Floods of Fear (1959).

He also directed Peter Sellers in The Battle of the Sexes (1959).

Crichton was the original director of Birdman of Alcatraz (1962), but he quit after clashing with Burt Lancaster. Crichton was then replaced by John Frankenheimer. Crichton said of the experience: "Had I known that Burt Lancaster was to be de facto producer, I do not think I would have accepted the assignment, as he had a reputation for quarreling with better directors than I. But Harold Hecht, the credited producer, had assured me that there would be no interference from Lancaster. This did not prove to be the case." Crichton was also planning another film project with Sammy Davis Jr., but it never came to fruition due to the death of a producer involved with it.

The Third Secret (1964) and He Who Rides a Tiger (1965), the last two films Crichton directed during the 1960s, were not successful. The latter film was the last film he directed for 23 years.

Crichton moved to directing television shows, then corporate videos. The latter were through John Cleese's company Video Arts. This led Cleese to propose Crichton returning to the crime comedy film genre. Beginning in 1983, Cleese and Crichton worked together on the story for A Fish Called Wanda. Cleese wrote the screenplay. When the film went into production in 1987, Cleese had to act as stand-by director for insurance reasons since Crichton was 77 years old. Cleese said of working with Crichton as a stand-by director: "That was a subterfuge. I knew the studio would be worried about Charlie's age. I don't know anything about how to direct, but that doesn't stop one-half of the directors. I simply prayed that Charlie would be on the set every morning. He shoots in such a way to convey the essence of every scene. He's economical. He's a dear man who's terrified of showing off. If he says anything shrewd or insightful, he'll apologize for a minute so he won't be considered pompous."

== Personal life and death ==
In 1936, Crichton married Vera Harman-Mills, and together they had two sons, David and Nicholas. Nicholas became an eminent judge and reformer in UK family law. Crichton married his second wife, Nadine Haze, in 1962, and their marriage lasted until his death.

Following completion of production on A Fish Called Wanda, Crichton retired from the entertainment industry and spent the rest of his life living comfortably, fishing in both Scotland and Wales. He died on 14 September 1999 in South Kensington, London, at the age of 89.

== Filmography ==
=== Feature films ===
Year	Title	Director	Writer	Notes
1944	For Those in Peril	Yes	No	
1945	Dead of Night	Yes	No	Co-Directed with Alberto Cavalcanti, Basil Dearden and Robert Hamer; Directed Segment: The Golfer's Story
1945	Painted Boats	Yes	No	
1947	Hue and Cry	Yes	No	
1948	Against the Wind	Yes	No	
1948	Another Shore	Yes	No	
1949	Train of Events	Yes	No	Co-Directed with Sidney Cole and Basil Dearden; Directed Segment: The Composer
1950	Dance Hall	Yes	No	
1951	The Lavender Hill Mob	Yes	No	Nominated – Golden Lion; Nominated – Directors Guild of America Award for Outstanding Directing – Feature Film
1952	Hunted	Yes	No	
1953	The Titfield Thunderbolt	Yes	No	
1954	The Love Lottery	Yes	No	
1954	The Divided Heart	Yes	No	
1957	Man in the Sky	Yes	No	
1958	Law and Disorder	Yes	No	
1959	Floods of Fear	Yes	Yes	
1959	The Battle of the Sexes	Yes	No	
1960	The Boy Who Stole a Million	Yes	Yes	
1964	The Third Secret	Yes	No	
1965	He Who Rides a Tiger	Yes	No	
1988	A Fish Called Wanda	Yes	Story	Nominated – Academy Award for Best Director; Nominated – Academy Award for Best Original Screenplay; Nominated – BAFTA Award for Best Film; Nominated – BAFTA Award for Best Direction; Nominated – Directors Guild of America Award for Outstanding Directing – Feature Film; Nominated – Writers Guild of America Award for Best Original Screenplay

=== Television ===
Year	Title	Notes
1957	ITV Play of the Week	Episode: "The Wild Duck"
1962-1963	Man of the World	3 episodes
1964	Danger Man	2 episodes
1964	The Human Jungle	Episode: "Ring of Hate"
1965-1969	The Avengers	5 episodes, including "The Correct Way to Kill"
1967-1968	Man in a Suitcase	6 episodes
1969	Strange Report	5 episodes
1970	Here Come the Double Deckers!	Episode: "The Go-Karters"
1971	Shirley's World	Episode: "The Colonel"
1972-1974	The Adventures of Black Beauty	18 episodes
1973-1974	The Protectors	5 episodes
1975	NBC Special Treat	Episode: "Into Infinity"
1975-1976	Space: 1999	14 episodes
1976	Rentaghost	1 episode (film sequences)
1978	The Professionals	Episode: "Look After Annie"
1978-1979	Return of the Saint	2 episodes
1979-1982	Dick Turpin	10 episodes

== See also ==
- List of Academy Award winners and nominees from Great Britain
