= Louis Nizer =

American lawyer

Louis Nizer (February 6, 1902 – November 10, 1994) was an American trial lawyer based in New York City. He was the senior partner of the law firm Phillips, Nizer, Benjamin, Krim & Ballon. In addition to his legal work, Louis Nizer was an author, artist, lecturer, and advisor.

== Early life ==
The son of Joseph and Bella Nizer, he was born in London, England, and came to the United States as a child. His father was the founder of a Brooklyn dry-cleaning business. As a youth, he sang in the choir of renowned cantor Josef "Yossele" Rosenblatt then, at age 10, began public speaking. Nizer "attributed his later fame as an orator and toastmaster to the lessons he learned as a socialist soapbox speaker." He won a government citation for his patriotic speeches during Broadway show intermissions for Liberty Bond drives during World War I.

He was a graduate of Columbia College, where he was coxswain for the rowing team, and played on the handball team. He joined the Alpha Epsilon Pi fraternity, and twice won the George William Curtis Prize for excellence in the public English orations as an undergraduate. He was later graduated from Columbia Law School.

== Career ==
In 1926, Nizer began working at the law office of Louis Phillips and, in 1928, the pair co-founded a law partnership: Phillips and Nizer, later Phillips, Nizer, Benjamin, Krim & Ballon. For a number of years, Nizer was listed in the Guinness Book of World Records as the "highest-paid lawyer in the world." He represented many celebrities in a variety of cases, including Johnny Carson, Salvador Dalí, Mae West, "Dr. J", and Roy Fruehauf of the Fruehauf Trailer Corporation.

His most famous cases, however, involved representing Quentin Reynolds in his successful libel suit against columnist Westbrook Pegler, and representing the broadcaster John Henry Faulk against AWARE, a right-wing organization that had falsely labeled him a communist. His representation of Reynolds served as the basis for the Broadway play A Case of Libel, while his legal victory in the Faulk case was credited with "breaking the back of blacklisting in broadcasting."

In 1944 he published the treatise What to do with Germany to discuss his plans for post-war Germany. He argued that self-rule in Germany had been a failure during the Weimar Republic, and that reform would have to be imposed from the outside by Germany giving up its sovereignty. Then the war criminals (including Goebbels, Hitler, and Goering) would be punished without trial. Germany would pay war reparations and all stolen property would be returned. He called for the German economy and military to be disarmed so that the nation would never be a threat again, and that the education system would have to be completely overturned.

In 1956, he was the lawyer for John Henry Faulk and won a libel case against the anti-communist group AWARE, Inc. for 3.5 million dollars, reduced to 750,000 upon appeal.

He wrote several books, among them the best-selling My Life In Court in 1961, about many of his famous cases, which spent many weeks on the New York Times bestseller list. He also wrote The Implosion Conspiracy in 1972, a study of the Julius and Ethel Rosenberg espionage case.

From 1928 to 1994, Nizer served as executive secretary and attorney for the New York Film Board of Trade, a position previously held by Louis Phillips. With Jack Valenti, Nizer helped create the motion picture ratings system of the Motion Picture Association of America (MPAA), for which he was general counsel. He also served as general counsel for United Artists.

After the assassination of John F. Kennedy, he wrote the foreword to the Doubleday & Co. publication of the Warren Commission report on the investigation of JFK's murder, which had been researched by a former Department of Justice prosecutor who had recently joined the firm, future boxing promoter Bob Arum. In February 1967 he debated Mark Lane on the validity of the Warren Report, the debate was broadcast on WNEW-TV.

== Film, television, and stage portrayals ==
Nizer was portrayed by George C. Scott in the 1975 CBS made-for-television film, Fear on Trial, co-starring William Devane as the blacklisted radio personality John Henry Faulk.

Both on stage and on television, Van Heflin portrayed Robert Sloane, a fictionalized version of Nizer, in the play A Case of Libel, which dramatized the Quentin Reynolds - Westbrook Pegler trial. The playwright was Henry Denker. The play was first televised on commercial television, but a new production shown on cable television in the 1980s, and later PBS, starred Edward Asner as Sloane and Daniel J. Travanti as Boyd Bendix, who was based on conservative columnist Westbrook Pegler.

== Personal life ==
Nizer was married to his wife Mildred for over 50 years until her death in 1993. He was a leader of March of Dimes and of Jewish causes.

He died at the age 92 in Beth Israel Medical Center Hospital in New York City in 1994 of kidney failure. He was survived by one stepchild (one stepchild preceded him in death) and several step-grandchildren and step-great-grandchildren. After his death, his law partner Perry Galler said: "Louis Nizer was this country's quintessential Renaissance man. He taught and inspired a whole generation of younger lawyers in the firm and around the country."

== Awards and honors ==
- George William Curtis Prize, given for excellence in the public delivery of English orations (won it twice as an undergraduate at Columbia)
- 1957, Yeshiva University award "for honoring the spiritual and cultural heritage of Judaism in America"
- 1962, Golden Plate Award of the American Academy of Achievement
- Trial Lawyer Hall of Fame

== Works ==
- New Courts of Industry: Self-Regulation Under the Motion Picture Code, with an Analysis of the Code (Longacre Press, 1935)
- Thinking on Your Feet (1940)
- What to Do With Germany (Ziff-Davis, 1944)
- Between You and Me (1948)
- My Life in Court (1961)
- The Jury Returns (1966)
- The Implosion Conspiracy (1972)
- Reflections Without Mirrors (1978)
- Catspaw (Carroll & Graf, 1992)
