= Alberto Cavalcanti =

Brazilian film director (1897–1982)

Alberto Cavalcanti

Alberto de Almeida Cavalcanti (February 6, 1897 – August 23, 1982) was a Brazilian-born film director and producer. He was often credited under the single name "Cavalcanti".

== Early life ==
Cavalcanti was born in Rio de Janeiro, the son of a prominent mathematician. He was a precociously intelligent child and, by the age of 15, was studying law at university, but was expelled following an argument with a professor. His father sent him to Geneva, Switzerland, on condition that he did not study law or politics. Cavalcanti chose to study architecture instead. At 18, he moved to Paris to work for an architect, later switching to working in interior design. After a visit to Brazil, he took up a position at the Brazilian consulate in Liverpool, England.

Cavalcanti corresponded with Marcel L'Herbier, a leading light in France's avant-garde film movement, which led to a job offer from L'Herbier for Cavalcanti to work as a set designer.

== Film career ==
In 1920, Cavalcanti left his job at the consulate and moved back to France to work for L'Herbier. Directing his first film in 1926, he was involved in the making of numerous others, the most notable being L'Inhumaine. Cavalcanti was soon making his own films, the first being a 1926 experimental documentary, Rien que les heures (Nothing But Time), showing a day in the life of Paris and its citizens. After the advent of talkies, he took a job at the French studios of Paramount Pictures, but found himself making more commercial films, which did not hold his interest, so he left Paramount in 1933.

The following year, Cavalcanti returned to England to work for the GPO Film Unit, headed by John Grierson. Cavalcanti spent seven years there in several departments, from production to sound engineer, working on many projects, most notably: Coal Face (1935), Night Mail (1936), Message to Geneva (1937), Four Barriers (1937), and Spare Time (1939). Although much of his work at the GPO was uncredited, he acted as a mentor to many new film makers. In 1937, he was appointed acting head of the GPO Film Unit when Grierson left for Canada. Told that the only way the position could become permanent was for him to become a naturalized British citizen, Cavalcanti decided to leave the unit.

In 1940, Cavalcanti joined Ealing Studios, under the leadership of producer Michael Balcon. He worked as an art editor, producer and director, and his most notable works of this period (many of them propaganda films) were Yellow Caesar (1941), Went the Day Well? (1942), Three Songs of Resistance (1943), Champagne Charlie (1944), Dead of Night (as co-director) (1945) and Nicholas Nickleby (1947). In 1946, Cavalcanti left Ealing after a dispute about money. He went on to direct three more films in the UK, before returning to Brazil in 1950.

In Brazil, Cavalcanti became head of production for Companhia Cinematográfica Vera Cruz, though the company eventually became insolvent. After being blacklisted in Brazil as a communist, he moved back to Europe, spending much of the 1960s and 1970s working as an itinerant film maker in various countries, including East Germany, France and Israel.

Cavalcanti died in Paris at the age of 85.

== Filmography as director ==
=== France ===
- 1926 Rien que les heures
- 1927 Le train sans yeux
- 1927 La P'tite Lili
- 1927 En rade
- 1928 Yvette
- 1928 La jalousie du barbouille
- 1928 Captain Fracasse
- 1929 Le petit chaperon rouge
- 1929 Vous verrez la semaine prochaine
- 1930 Toute sa vie
- 1930 A canção do berço
- 1930 À mi-chemin du ciel
- 1931 The Devil's Holiday
- 1931 Dans une ile perdue
- 1932 En lisant le journal
- 1932 Le jour du frotteur
- 1932 Revue Montmartroise
- 1932 Nous ne ferrons jamais du cinéma
- 1932 Le truc du brésilien
- 1933 Le mari garon
- 1933 Plaisirs défendus
- 1933 Tour de chant
- 1934 Coralie and Company

=== GPO & Crown Film Units ===
- 1934 Pett and Pott: A fairy story of the suburbs
- 1934 The glorious Sixth of June: New rates
- 1935 The King's Stamp
- 1935 Coal Face
- 1936 Message from Geneva
- 1937 Line to Tcherva Hut
- 1937 Men of the Alps (co-prod with Switzerland)
- 1937 Roadways
- 1937 We Live In Two Worlds
- 1937 Who writes to Switzerland?
- 1937 Four barriers
- 1938 Mony a pickle
- 1938 Happy in the morning: A film fantasy
- 1939 Mid-summer day's work
- 1939 The Chiltern country
- 1940 Alice in Switzerland
- 1940 La cause commune
- 1940 Factory front
- 1940 Mastery of the sea

=== Ealing and UK ===
- 1941 Yellow Caesar (short)
- 1942 Went the Day Well?
- 1943 Watertight (short)
- 1943 Three Songs of Resistance
- 1944 Champagne Charlie
- 1945 Dead of Night ('Christmas party' & 'ventriloquist' episodes)
- 1947 Nicholas Nickleby
- 1947 They Made Me a Fugitive
- 1947 The First Gentleman
- 1949 For Them That Trespass
- 1961 The Monster of Highgate Ponds

=== Brazil and others ===
- 1950 Caiçara (Brazil)
- 1952 Simão, o caolho (Brazil)
- 1952 Song of the Sea (Brazil)
- 1955 Mulher de verdade (Brazil)
- 1955/60 Herr Puntila and His Servant Matti (Austria/East Germany)
- 1957 Die Windrose (East Germany)
- 1959 Venetian Honeymoon (France/Italy)
- 1967 Thus Spoke Theodore Herzl (Israel)
- 1969 Les empailles (France)
- 1971 La visite de la vieille dame (France)
- 1976 Le voyageur du silence (France)
- 1976 Um homem e o cinema (Brazil)
