= Neville Dilkes =

English conductor and organist (1930–2025)

Neville Dilkes (28 August 1930 – 10 May 2025) was an English conductor and organist. He is particularly remembered for his pioneering recordings of British music with the English Sinfonia and other orchestras, including his HMV recording of E.J. Moeran’s Symphony in G minor in 1973.

== Life and career ==
Dilkes was born in Derby, England on 28 August 1930, to a musical family. He became a Fellow of Trinity College of Music, London, and later did his National Service in the Royal Army Medical Corps. He taught at Repton, and then in 1955 was named Director of Music at Corby Grammar School, where he mounted a school production of Gluck's opera Orfeo ed Euridice. This brought together a number of musicians from the Midlands, who formed the Kettering Symphony Orchestra under Dilkes' leadership.

In 1961, he formed the Midland Sinfonia and also a chamber music performance group, Opera Da Camera. The Midland Sinfonia was administered from Dilkes' home for its first five years; it acquired a permanent office in Nottingham in 1966, and gave its first London concert in 1968. It was later renamed the English Sinfonia.

In 1963, he joined the Netherlands Radio Union International Conductors' Course, where his principal tutor was Dean Dixon. He was the inaugural winner of the Watney-Sargent Award, chosen by Malcolm Sargent himself.

He was an associate conductor of the Philomusica of London. He was a Fellow of the Royal College of Organists.

=== Personal life and death ===
Dilkes married Pamela Walton, who died in 1979, they had four daughters. He married Christine Allen in 1986.

He lived in Nalliers, France. Dilkes died in Vendée on 10 May 2025, at the age of 94.

== Recordings ==
Dilkes’ recordings include:

- Malcolm Arnold, Sinfonietta No. 1, Op. 48; Sinfonietta No. 2, Op. 65 (Philharmonia Orchestra, 1977)
- George Butterworth, The Banks of Green Willow, A Shropshire Lad
- Franz Doppler, Wood-bird for flute and 4 horns, Op. 21 (Philharmonia Orchestra)
- Hamilton Harty, A John Field Suite (English Sinfonia)
- Arthur Honegger, Concerto da camera for flute, English horn and strings
- John Ireland, The Holy Boy (English Sinfonia)
- Constant Lambert, Concerto for Piano and Nine Players, Richard Rodney Bennett, members of the English Sinfonia, Polydor 2383 391, 1976
- Walter Leigh, Concertino for Harpsichord and Strings (conductor and harpischordist; English Sinfonia)
- E. J. Moeran, Symphony in G minor, Two Pieces for Small Orchestra (English Sinfonia)
- Peter Warlock, Capriol Suite
