= Charles Lynch (pianist) =

Irish pianist (1906–1984)

- Born: Charles Edgeworth Cagney Lynch; 22 October 1906; County Cork, Ireland
- Died: 15 September 1984 (aged 77) Cork, Ireland
- Genres: Classical
- Occupation: Musician
- Instrument: Piano

Charles Edgeworth Cagney Lynch (22 October 1906 – 15 September 1984) was an Irish pianist who premiered works by several important 20th-century composers.

== Background and early life ==
Charles Lynch was born in Parkgariff, County Cork. His father was a British army colonel and his mother came from a well-known Cork business dynasty, the Suttons. Novelist Maria Edgeworth was a direct ancestor. While Lynch was still a young boy, the family moved to Greenock in western Scotland and it was there, at the Tontine Hotel, that the young pianist gave his first public recital at the age of nine. When he was fifteen, he won a scholarship to the Royal Academy of Music, London, where he studied under York Bowen and, later, Egon Petri.

== Career in England ==
Lynch became a popular recitalist in London during the 1920s and 1930s. He gave the first performance in England of Rachmaninoff's Piano Sonata No. 2 in B flat minor, having been coached beforehand by the composer. Sir Arnold Bax's Fourth Piano Sonata (1932) is dedicated to the 26-year-old Lynch, whom Bax later described as "Ireland's most imaginative pianist". In addition to concert recitals he broadcast regularly with the BBC and in 1937 acted as assistant to Sir Thomas Beecham at Covent Garden. Lynch was the Ballet Rambert's pianist for many years, having helped Marie Rambert form the company.

== Return to Ireland ==
A pacifist, Lynch returned to Ireland following the outbreak of World War II, where he became the country's premier concert pianist. During this phase of his career he premiered a number of works by leading Irish composers, including Brian Boydell's Sonata for Cello and Piano (1945) and Sean Ó Riada's Nomos No. 4 (1959). Lynch also performed in the world première of English composer Ernest John Moeran's Cello Sonata in A minor, given in Dublin in May 1947. He was joined by the composer's wife, cellist Peers Coetmore.

In February 1971 at Trinity College, Dublin, he played the entire set of Liszt's transcriptions of Beethoven's symphonies over four successive Saturday evenings. The Irish Times critic, Charles Acton, paid tribute to Lynch's achievement:

"It is doubtful if Liszt himself ever played them as a series. Since his day, individual virtuosi have played individual symphonies but it is possible that Charles Lynch is the first person who has played all of them as a public series - and all in four weeks. On that score we may be in the presence of a historical event. We are certainly in the presence of a quite tremendous physical, mental, emotional, and intellectual feat."

Lynch continued to give public recitals throughout Ireland until shortly before his death at the age of 77. He also lectured in music at University College, Cork and gave masterclasses at the Cork School of Music. In 1982, Lynch received a doctorate in music from the National University of Ireland.

Lynch's technique was remarkable for the stillness with which he sat, making the most difficult of music seem almost technically unremarkable. His recorded legacy is small, but includes music by Samuel Barber, Moeran's Violin Sonata (with Geraldine O'Grady, violin) as well as music by Irish composers such as Aloys Fleischmann.

== Final years ==
Towards the end of his life he lived in very reduced circumstances. He died in Cork at St. Finbarr's Hospital and was buried near Sir Arnold Bax in St. Finbarr's Cemetery, Glasheen Road, Cork.

== Recordings ==
- Moeran: Sonata for violin and piano in E minor (with Geraldine O'Grady, violin), EMI Classics 5851542
- Bax: Sonata for violin and piano no. 3 (with May Harrison, violin), Symposium 1075
- Piano Vol. 1 (features Fleischmann: Sreath do Phiano, Victory: Prelude and Toccata), New Irish Recording Company NIR001, 1971
- Sixty years of Music (features Beethoven's Moonlight Sonata, and pieces by Scarlatti, Chopin, and Tchaikovsky), Sound News Productions SM 55 (promoted by the Cork Dance Company), 1975
