= Belle Gonzalez =

Filipino-born singer-songwriter and pianist

- Born: Isabela Maria Tapales Gonzalez
- Genres: Jazz
- Instruments: vocal, piano, guitar

Isabela Maria Tapales Gonzalez (b. 1931), professionally known as Belle Gonzalez, is a jazz singer-songwriter, pianist and teacher.

== Background and education ==
Her mother was Isang Tapales (1901–1987), a Filipino soprano opera singer and voice teacher who performed internationally, most notably as Madam Butterfly for the La Scala Opera Company in Milan. In her native country Tapales founded the Philippine Opera Company. Belle's father was Jerzy Cziaplitzky, a Polish baritone. From her parents she inherited the ability to sing in eight different languages. Her uncle was the Filipino administrator, composer, conductor and violinist Ramón Tapales (1906–1995).

Belle Gonzalez took on the name of her mother's second husband, Enrique Gonzalez, a Filipino/Spanish student of opera in Milan. She grew up in Italy, and with her half-sister was later placed with a family in Belgium while her mother toured.

== Manila ==
Returning to the Philippines in 1939 as war approached she began learning classical piano. But her family lost everything when Manila was raised to the ground in 1945 and so to earn money she began singing jazz music in clubs, touring, and eventually broadcasting and recording. A version of No Other Love she recorded sold several million copies in the Philippines.

While performing in Singapore she met John Boyden, then a British soldier on National Service, later a record executive with EMI. They subsequently moved to England and married in 1957. For several years they ran record shops, initially Philharmonic Records in Richmond and then in Connaught Street, Bayswater, but later divorced.

== London ==
In the late 1950s through until the early 1970s Gonzalez was a frequent broadcaster on BBC Radio, working with (among others) Sidney Bright, Sandy Brown, Jack Coles, Sam Costa, Max Jaffa, Henry Krein and Peter Yorke. In the mid-1960s she recorded songs by Wallace Southam on two EPs: Poets Set in Jazz (1965) and its follow up Contemporary Poets Set in Jazz (1966), and also performed them at a Wigmore Hall recital. The recordings were reviewed favourably by classical music critic Wilfrid Mellers.

In 1966 her first LP was released, shared with singer Russ Loader. At this period Gonzalez often toured with leading London jazz musicians, including Kenny Napper (piano, bass), Tony Crombie (drums), Bob Burns (saxophone), Johnny Scott (flute and alto) and Kenny Wheeler (trumpet and flugelhorn).

She continued as a cabaret singer in London throughout the 1970s accompanying herself on piano and guitar, or with jazz ensembles such as the Pat Smythe Septet. In 1972 she released Belle, an album of her own songs, for George Martin's Air Studios. Cilla Black had recorded her song "Black Paper Roses" two years earlier.

== Later life ==
Gonzalez retired from singing in the 1980s and became a piano teacher, preparing pupils for ABRSM and Trinity examinations from her home in North London.

== Recordings ==
- Al Fairweather and Sandy Brown's Allstars. Doctor McJazz, Columbia 33SX 1306 (1961)
- Belle Gonzalez with sextet. Poets Set in Jazz, Jupiter JUP OC37 (EP) (1965)
- Belle Gonzalez and Russ Loader. Ten Again, music director Mark Wirtz. World Record Club ST 452 (1966)
- Belle Gonzalez with sextet. Contemporary Poets Set in Jazz, Jupiter JUP OC39 (EP) (1966)
- Belle Gonzales, Pat Smythe (piano), Jeff Clyne (bass). Ulysses Come Back: Sketch for a Musical (text Lawrence Durrell), Turret Records (1970)
- Belle Gonzalez. Belle, Columbia – SCX 6484 (1972)
