= Reduction (music) =

Music theory

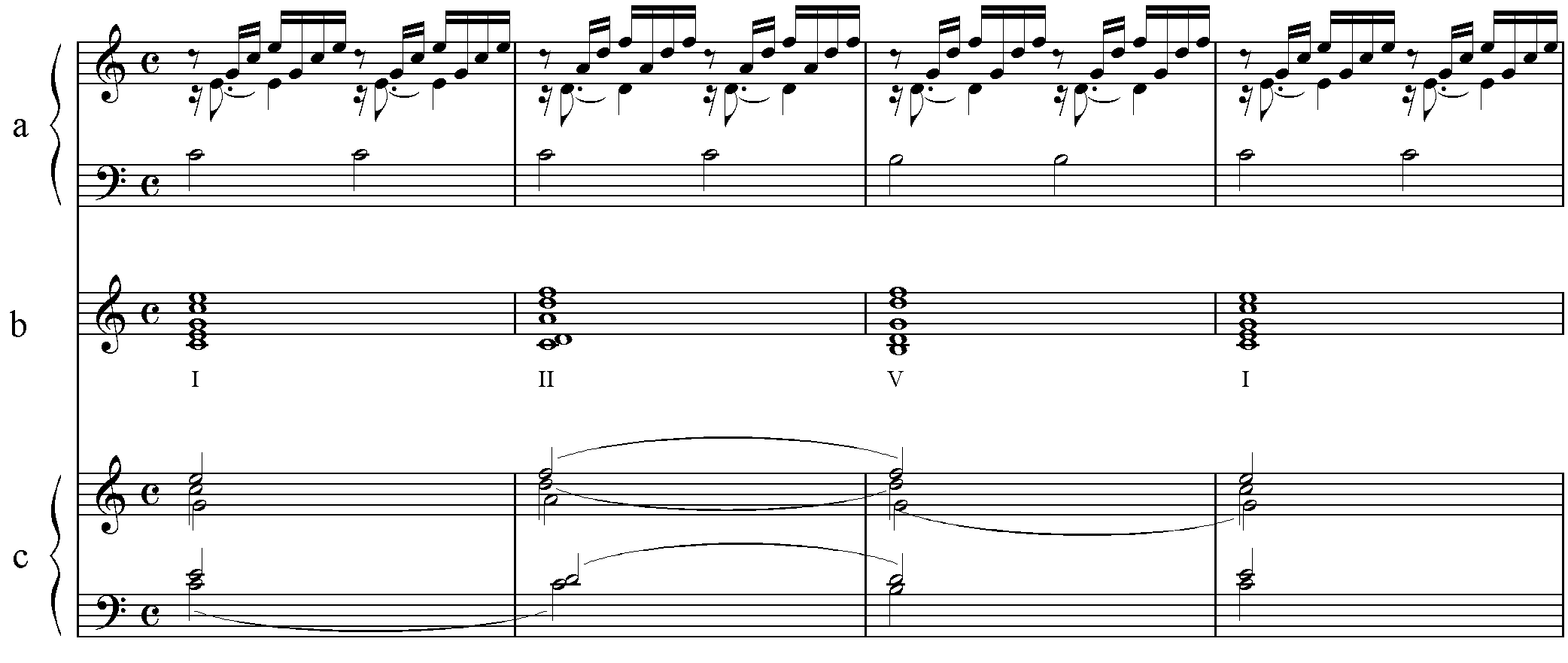
(a) first four measures of Bach's Preludium in C major (BWV 846a). (b) and (c) block chord reduction and voice leading reduction ease analysis and practice

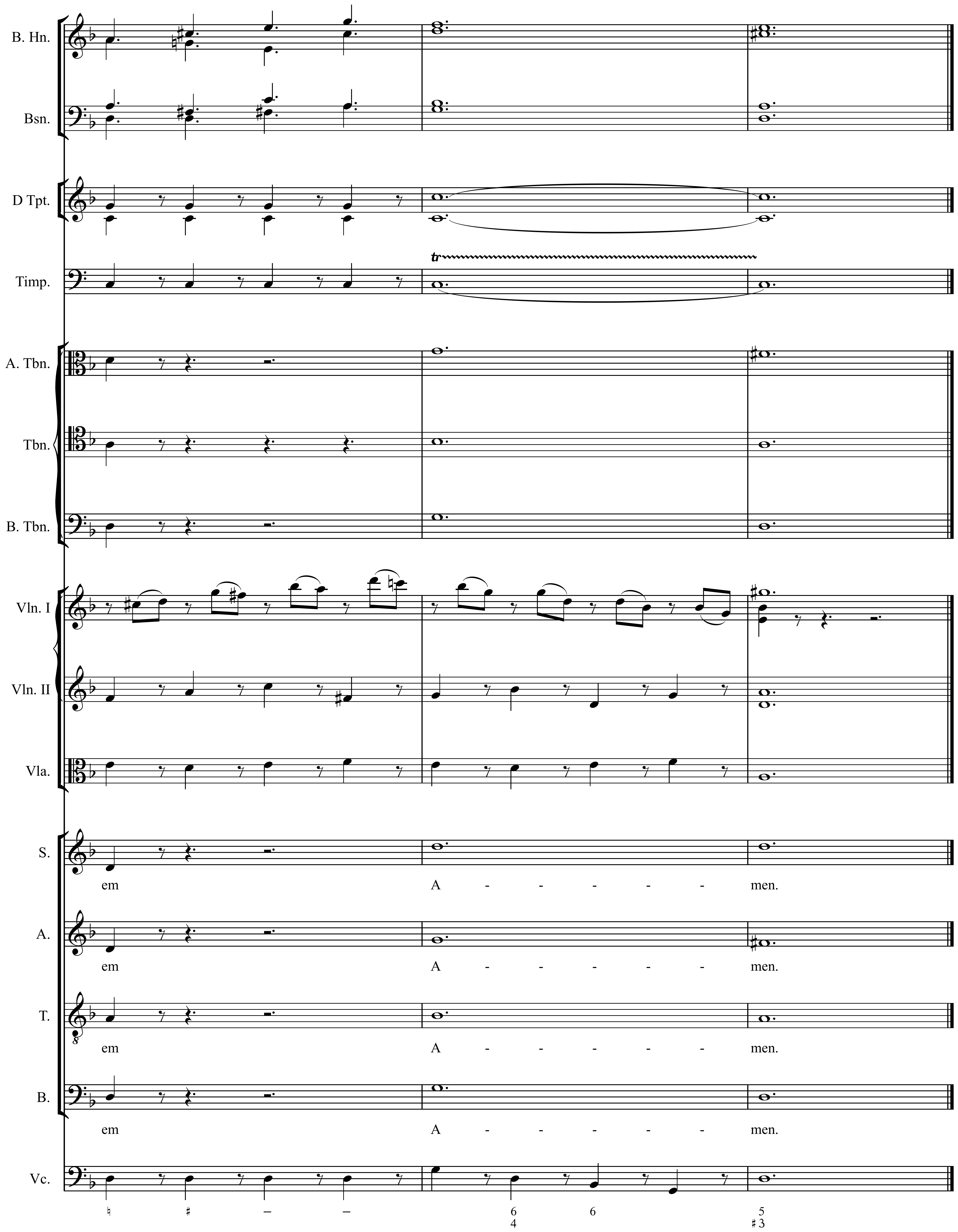
Full score of the "Lacrimosa" from Mozart's Requiem.

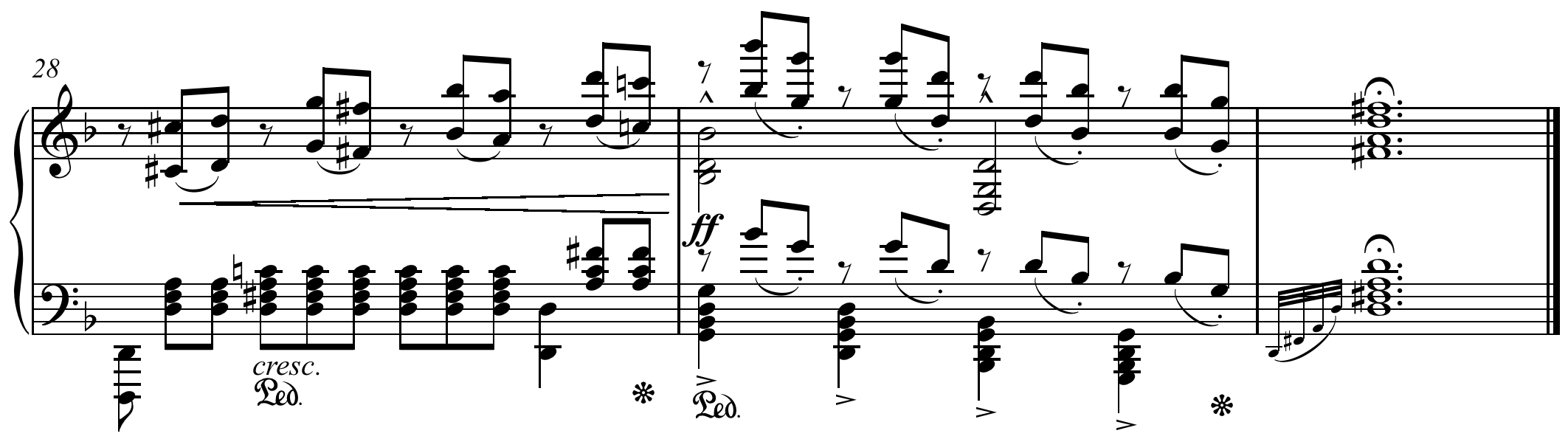
Two-hand piano reduction of the "Lacrimosa" from Mozart's Requiem, arranged by Franz Liszt.

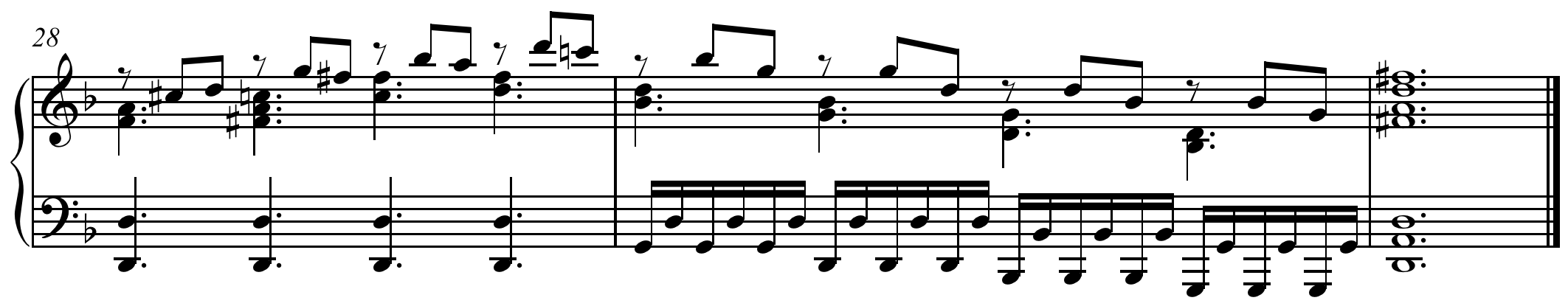
Two-hand piano reduction of the "Lacrimosa" from Mozart's Requiem, arranged by Carl Czerny.

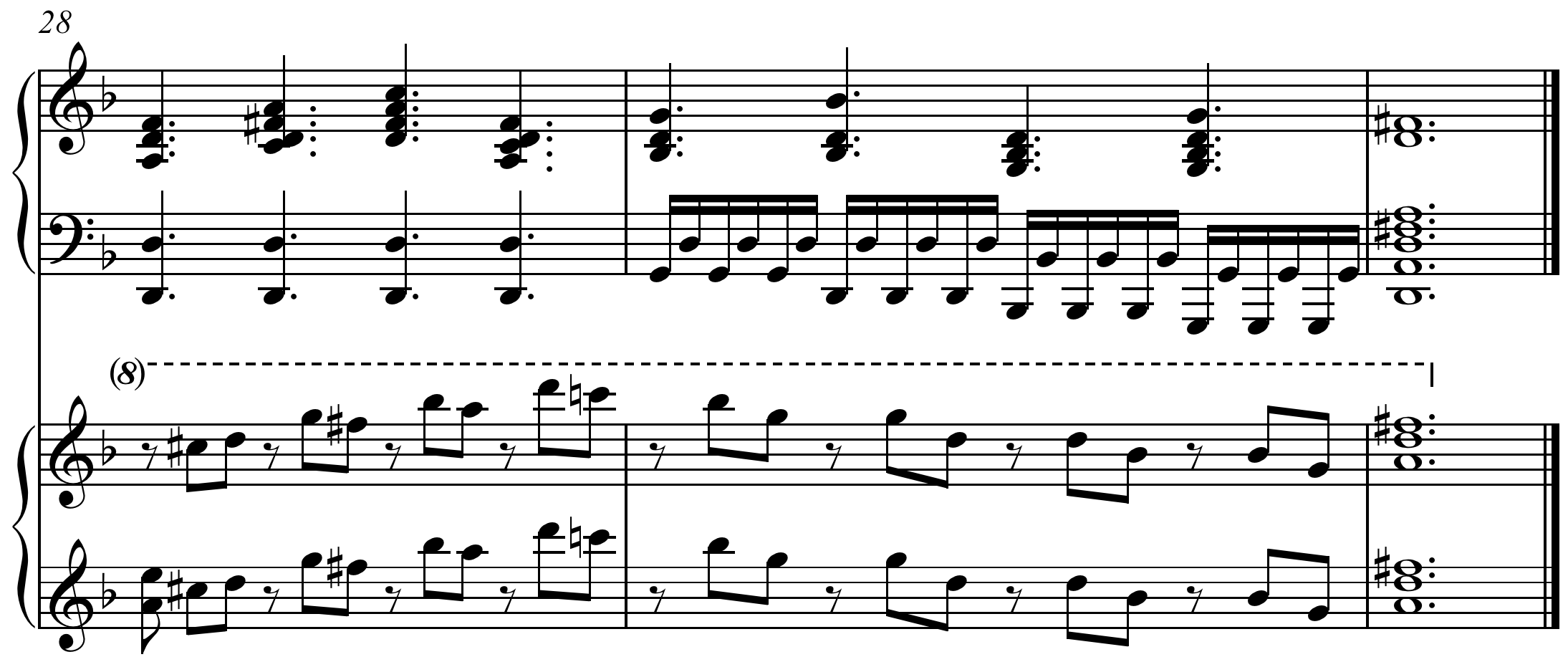
Four-hand piano reduction of the "Lacrimosa" from Mozart's Requiem, arranged by Czerny.

The Queen's Dolour (A Farewell) by Henry Purcell / Realised by Ronald Stevenson (1958)
Performed live by Mark Gasser

Awake, the Voice Commands
Transcribed for piano by Ferruccio Busoni from the Schübler Chorales by Johann Sebastian Bach, performed by Martha Goldstein

Prelude and Fugue in A minor, BWV 543
Franz Liszt's transcription of Prelude and Fugue in A minor, BWV 543 composed by Johann Sebastian Bach, performed by Raymond Smullyan

In music, a reduction is an arrangement or transcription of an existing score or composition in which complexity is lessened to make analysis, performance, or practice easier or clearer; the number of parts may be reduced or rhythm may be simplified, such as through the use of block chords.

== Orchestral ==
An orchestral reduction is a sheet music arrangement of a work originally for full symphony orchestra (such as a symphony, overture, or opera), rearranged for a single instrument (typically piano or organ), a smaller orchestra, or a chamber ensemble with or without a keyboard (e.g. a string quartet). A reduction for solo piano is sometimes called a piano reduction or piano score.

During opera rehearsals, a répétiteur (piano player) will typically read from a piano reduction of the opera. When a choir is learning a work scored for choir and full orchestra, the initial rehearsals will usually be done with a pianist playing a piano reduction of the orchestra part. Before the advent of the phonograph, arrangements of orchestral works for solo piano or piano four hands were in common use for enjoyment at home.

A reduction for a smaller orchestra or chamber ensemble may be used when not enough players are available, when a venue is too small to accommodate the full orchestra, to accompany less powerful voices, or to save money by hiring fewer players.

== Piano ==
A piano reduction or piano transcription is sheet music for the piano (a piano score) that has been compressed and/or simplified so as to fit on a two-line staff and be playable on the piano. It is also considered a style of orchestration or music arrangement less well known as contraction scoring, a subset of elastic scoring.

The most notable example is Franz Liszt's transcriptions for solo piano of Ludwig van Beethoven's symphonies.

According to Arnold Schoenberg, a piano reduction should "only be like the view of a sculpture from one viewpoint", and he advises that timbre and thickness should largely be ignored, since "the attempt to make a useful object equally usable for a variety of purposes is usually the way to spoil it completely".

== See also ==
- Piano-vocal score
- Social history of the piano
- Transcription (music)
