= Symphony in G minor (Moeran) =

The Symphony in G minor was the only completed symphony written by Ernest John Moeran in 1934–37. The symphony takes about 45 minutes to play.

== Background ==
In 1926, the conductor of the Hallé Orchestra, Sir Hamilton Harty, commissioned a symphony from Moeran. He had already been working on a symphony since 1924, and the premiere performance of the new work was announced for 4 March 1926. However, when it was almost finished, he decided he was not satisfied with its structure and withdrew it. Over the next eight years he worked on his revision of the piece, but in 1934 he abandoned his sketches and started again. He reused some earlier material, but the work was substantially new. The symphony was finished on 24 January 1937, and dedicated to Harty. Harty initially refused the dedication after he was overlooked as the conductor for the first performance (by now he was ill and had left the Hallé Orchestra).

Much of the work was written in County Kerry, Ireland, where Moeran spent most of this time, but the slow second movement was inspired by the sand dunes and marshes of East Norfolk, England, and may have its roots in Moeran's 1924 arrangement of a folk-song called The Shooting of His Dear (the 5th of his Six Songs from Norfolk).

The first performance was on 13 January 1938 in the Queen's Hall, played by the Royal Philharmonic Society, conducted by Leslie Heward, whom Moeran considered to be the work's finest interpreter. It was played at a Prom Concert on 11 August 1938, with the BBC Symphony Orchestra under Sir Henry Wood. (It did not receive its second performance at the Proms until 23 July 2009, under Vassily Sinaisky.)

Moeran completed no more full symphonies. His three-movement Sinfonietta appeared in 1944, and an orchestral Serenade in 1948. He was working on a second symphony (in E♭) at the time of his death in 1950. The manuscript of that work and various others were donated by his widow Peers Coetmore to the Victorian College of the Arts in Melbourne, Australia.

== Music ==
The symphony is scored for 2 flutes (II takes piccolo), 2 oboes, 2 clarinets, 2 bassoons, 4 horns, 3 trumpets, 3 trombones, tuba, timpani, percussion (triangle, tamtam, tenor drum, snare drum, bass drum, cymbals), harp, and strings.

The work is in four movements:

1. Allegro
2. Lento
3. Vivace
4. Lento – Allegro molto

The symphony's first movement is a robust sonata form, with a questioning harmonic structure.

The work and its orchestration show the influence of other composers, including Bax, Delius, Warlock, van Dieren, and most particularly Sibelius. The Scherzo begins and ends with a solo oboe, as does the Scherzo of Sibelius's 4th Symphony; there are echoes of Tapiola. The influence of folk elements is also apparent: Eric Blom said it contains "a touch of dialect". There are also jazz-influenced rhythms.

== Reception ==
The work was originally subject to considerable criticism, on the grounds that it was too derivative (Wilfrid Mellers said it could not have been written before Vaughan Williams had shown how to write a symphony), undisciplined and showed the composer's inexperience of symphonic form. By 1942, however, it had become accepted. In that year, Novello & Co published the symphony, and the British Council undertook a promotion of British culture overseas. The music section of the project was a recording of significant recent compositions by British composers, and Moeran's Symphony in G minor was the first work to be recorded. It was recorded in November/December 1942, in Manchester, with the Hallé Orchestra under Leslie Heward. The composer was present for some of the sessions (he proved to be a distraction, and it was suggested he let the musicians get on with their job without his "assistance"). Heward was already seriously ill with tuberculosis, and died only five months later.

Other conductors to record Moeran's Symphony in G minor include Neville Dilkes (English Sinfonia, 1972), Sir Adrian Boult (New Philharmonia Orchestra, released 1975), Vernon Handley (Ulster Orchestra, 1987) and David Lloyd-Jones (Bournemouth Symphony Orchestra, 2001).
