= Wallace Southam =

British business executive and amateur composer (1900–1990)

Thomas Wallace Southam (11 October 1900 – 14 May 1990) was an executive in the oil industry and an amateur composer. He composed art songs, including some jazz settings of classic and contemporary poetry, and began publishing and recording them during the 1960s. Southam worked with Lawrence Durrell and the London publisher and bookseller Bernard Stone, among others.

== Education and early career ==
Southam was born in Atcham, near Shrewsbury in Shropshire. He was the elder son of Colonel Herbert Robert Henry Southam of the Royal Garrison Artillery Territorial Force unit and Clara Mary Coltart. The family lived ultimately at Loxley House, Maybury Hill, Woking. He was educated at the University of Cambridge. Southam made his living as a businessman, and from the 1920s was working in China for the Asiatic Petroleum Company a joint venture between the Shell and Royal Dutch oil companies.

He married Anna Christabel Gair in Fuzhou (then known as Foochow) in 1931.They were in Athens from the late 1930s, where Southam became associated with the British Council.

== Wartime and film work ==
While in Athens Southam became friendly with Lawrence Durrell, and after Durrell's daughter Penelope was born on 4 June 1940, the Southams opened up their house to Lawrence and his wife Nancy Myers for a few weeks while Nancy was recuperating. Southam and Durrell met up again in London in the late 1960s, working together on a musical (with both words and music by Durrell) called Ulysses Come Back.

Wartime exploits between the Shetland Islands and Norway that Southam was involved in between 1941 and 1943 were the subject matter of a 1954 drama documentary Suicide Mission in which Southam himself played a British Admiral. The film was based on a 1951 book by David Howarth, The Shetland Bus. Southam also appeared (as Captain Scott) in the 1956 film Kontakt!, also set in Norway and based on a true story.

== Amateur composer ==
Southam was never prolific, but he composed songs on an occasional basis from the 1920s onwards, in the various locations worldwide where he was posted. In the 1960s, he set about getting them published and recorded.

In 1962, he produced an LP record of English songs with Wilfred Brown and the pianist Margaret NcNamee. Among the tracks, he included two of his own songs: "Nemea" by Lawrence Durrell (in 7/8 meter, one of the commonest of Greek folk rhythms) and "A Holy Sonnet" by John Donne. The sheet music for both songs was published by Augener. On the strength of this, Colin Wilson mentioned Southam in his book on music, Brandy of the Damned in 1964, ranking him alongside other English song composers such as Ivor Gurney, Gerald Finzi and Herbert Howells.

Southam began working closely with the poet, bookshop owner and publisher Bernard Stone (1924–2005). Stone ran the Turret Book Shop at 5, Kensington Church Walk in Kensington, London (where Durrell was a regular visitor), and Southam became associated with Jupiter Records, set up by the writer V.C. Clinton-Baddeley in 1958 to release poetry readings read by poets. Jupiter was also based in the Kensington Church Walk premises.

Poets Set in Jazz (1965) and its follow-up, Contemporary Poets Set in Jazz (1966), were two seven-inch EPs issued on the Jupiter label, performed by the singer Belle Gonzalez and sextet. They included Southam's settings of poetry by Auden, Michael Baldwin, Byron, Lawrence Durrell, Edward Lucie-Smith and Christina Rossetti. Gonzalez herself claims that these settings were the first examples of what has since been termed "Jazz Lieder". They caught the attention of Wilfrid Mellers, who called Southam's settings "haunting and beguiling", effecting "a rewarding compromise between jazz, pop and art". Leonard Salzedo arranged the music on the first disc and Kenny Napper on the second.

In 1967, Play Songs for Infants, with words by Clinton-Baddeley and a score including percussion parts by the music educationalist Avril Dankworth (sister of John Dankworth), were published by Feldman. An EP record was issued by Jupiter the same year.

A year later, on 15 February 1968, a concert was held – "Jupiter and Turret at the Wigmore Hall: New Jazz and Modern Poetry" – featuring two settings of Durrell poems, Lesbos and In Arcadia, along with other songs by John Tavener and Patrick Gowers. Turret Records was also the issuer – in May 1969 – of Southam's most substantial publication – Songs of a Sunday Composer, collecting previous recordings and adding new ones. The LP was issued in a limited edition of 300 copies.

== Books ==
In 1979 The Charge of the Mouse Brigade, a children's book by Bernard Stone, illustrated by Tony Ross and with music by Southam, was published in a limited edition by the Andersen Press. In 1981 Southam and Stone produced A Day to Remember, a children's picture book by Stone that included a carol by Southam ("The Christmas Message") at the end. It was published by the Four Winds Press. And in 1986, Turret published Poems for Clocks, a collaboration between Southam and Edward Lucie-Smith (Southam had already set Lucie-Smith's poem Silence in 1967), again in a limited edition, this time 300 copies.

== Death ==
Southam died on 14 May 1990 in Chiswick, aged 89.

== Selected songs ==
- "Down by the Salley Gardens" (W. B. Yeats), Cambridge, 1919
- "Ha'necker Mill" (Hilaire Belloc), Foochow, 1927
- "We'll Go No More A-Roving" (Lord Byron), Athens, 1940
- "Underneath the Abject Willow" (W.H. Auden), Athens, 1941
- "Sigh No More, Ladies" (Shakespeare), Beirut, 1942
- "Have You Seen but a White Liiy Grow" (Ben Jonson), Athens, 1945
- "A Holy Sonnet" (John Donne), Athens, 1947
- "Nothing Is Lost, Sweet Self" (Lawrence Durrell), Athens, 1947
- "Namea" (Lawrence Durrell), Athens, 1947
- "In Arcadia" (Lawrence Durrell), Athens, 1947
- "When I Am Dead, My Dearest" (Christina Rossetti), Athens, 1947
- "Paramythi" (G. Karapanos), Athens, 1948
- "The Half Moon Westers Low, My Love" (A. E. Housman), Malta, 1951
- "Over de høje Fjælde" (Bjørnstjerne Bjørnson), Oslo, 1955
- "Stop All the Clocks" (W. H. Auden), Kingston-on-Thames, 1965
- "Lesbos" (Lawrence Durrell), Kingston-on-Thames, 1965
- "The Housewife" (Michael Baldwin), Kingston-on-Thames, 1965
- "Time of Roses" (Thomas Hood), 1966
- "Timothy Winters" (Charles Causley), Chiswick, 1967
- "Silence" (Edward Lucie-Smith), 1967
- "Gone Ladies" (Christopher Logue), 1968

=== Collections ===
- Fifteen Love Songs, Athens, 1948, privately printed
- Poetry Set in Jazz: Musical Settings By Wallace Southam, Robbins Music Corp, 1966

=== Recordings ===
- A Recital of Songs by English Composers, JUR 00A5 (1962)
- Songs About Greece JUP OC36 (EP) (1964)
- Poets Set in Jazz, JUP OC37 (EP) (1965)
- Contemporary Poets Set in Jazz, JUP OC39 (EP) (1966)
- Songs of a Sunday Composer, Turret Records, TRT-101 (1969)
