= Fourth estate (disambiguation) =

Fourth estate is a traditional term for the press; it may also refer to "the mob" (as in mob rule) or the proletariat.

Fourth Estate may also refer to:

== Publications ==
- The Fourth Estate (novel), by Jeffrey Archer
- Fourth Estate (George Mason University newspaper) or IV Estate, a student newspaper published by George Mason University
- The Fourth Estate, a student newspaper published by the University of Wisconsin–Green Bay
- The Fourth Estate, a student newspaper published by the Harrisburg Area Community College
- The 4th Estate, a weekly newspaper in Halifax, Nova Scotia (1969–1977)
- 4th Estate, an imprint of HarperCollins

== Government ==
- Fourth Estate of the pre-Union Scottish Parliament, the shire commissioners
- Fourth Estate (Department of Defense)

== Other ==
- Estates of the Realm, a social hierarchy, which in some countries was composed of four estates
- The Fourth Estate (film), a 1940 documentary film directed by Paul Rotha
- The Fourth Estate (painting), a c. 1901 painting by Giuseppe Pellizza da Volpedo
- The Fourth Estate (TV series), a Showtime documentary series
