= John Boyden =

British music executive (1936–2021)

- Born: 14 September 1936; Woolwich, London
- Died: 21 September 2021 (aged 85); Cheltenham General Hospital, Gloucestershire
- Occupations: Music executive and producer

John Boyden (14 September 1936 – 21 September 2021) was a British classical music executive. After completing national service in Malaya, he joined the staff of the HMV store on Oxford Street. Boyden later founded his own business, Philharmonic Records, in Richmond, as well as the record label John Boyden Recordings. By 1967 he was working with Paul Hamlyn at the Music for Pleasure joint venture with EMI, where he established the Classics for Pleasure sub-label.

In April 1975 Boyden was appointed managing director of the London Symphony Orchestra. He was dismissed in October after part of the board unsuccessfully attempted to remove chief conductor André Previn. Boyden subsequently wrote for Private Eye as its music correspondent under the pseudonym Lunchtime O'Boulez. In 1976 he launched the Enigma Classics record label with Peter Whiteside, which was sold to WEA two years later. Disillusioned with the extent of post-production editing in classical music, Boyden later founded the New Queen's Hall Orchestra to promote performances aligned with his musical ideals.

== Early life and career ==
Boyden was born in Woolwich, London, on 14 September 1936. He was the son of Frank Boyden, a trumpet player in the London Philharmonic Orchestra, and his wife, Agnes (née Yates). Boyden was evacuated to Buckinghamshire at the age of four. He returned to London to attend Bloomfield Road Junior Mixed School in Woolwich, followed by grammar school. In later life, Boyden took pride in his state school education in a field dominated by those educated at private schools. He undertook his national service as a private in the Queen's Royal Regiment (West Surrey), serving in Malaya during the Emergency. While stationed there he met the singer Belle Gonzalez, and they returned to England and married in 1957.

From the age of 20, Boyden worked at the HMV music shop on Oxford Street, London. He left to found Philharmonic Records, a shop in Richmond, London, and, with Gonzalez, was running a record shop in Connaught Street, Bayswater, in 1965. After learning how to edit master tapes, he set up John Boyden Recordings as a record label. In 1967 he joined the Music for Pleasure label, a joint venture between EMI and publisher Paul Hamlyn to repackage and sell recordings. After his marriage to Gonzalez was dissolved, Boyden married Betty Gilbert in 1968. They remained together until her death in 2011 and had two sons.

Boyden created Classics for Pleasure as a sub-label in 1970 and acted as its product director and producer; the sub-label sold four million copies in the following four years. Classics for Pleasure, whose records were sold at low prices, played a significant role in promoting classical music to the general public.

== Orchestral roles and Enigma Classics ==
In April 1975 Boyden was appointed managing director of the London Symphony Orchestra (LSO). At the time André Previn was the orchestra's chief conductor. Some of the orchestra's board considered Previn to be producing "lightweight" interpretations of works, compared to the output of Bernard Haitink at the London Philharmonic Orchestra. These members failed in an effort to remove Previn. Boyden, who had been associated, rightly or wrongly, with the anti-Previn movement, was sacked in October.

Boyden later stated that he considered there to be an excessive drinking culture among members of the orchestra. Three days before he was sacked, at the end of the orchestra's tour of Japan, he had described, in an interview given to The Guardian, the orchestra's players as a "beer-swilling crowd". In the same interview he had stated that Previn was overpaid.

Boyden afterwards applied for benefits at the Job Centre. Upon stating his last post was as managing director at the LSO he was told "I don't think we've got any of those [positions available]". After his death it was revealed that Boyden was employed by Private Eye as their first music correspondent, under the penname "Lunchtime O'Boulez". "Lunchtime O'Booze" was a regular pseudonym that had been used in the magazine, in reference to the liquid lunch historically consumed by journalists. Boyden's moniker combined this with the surname of French composer and conductor Pierre Boulez. A series of articles in Private Eye in the early 1980s that suggested drunkenness, financial incompetence and absenteeism among LSO players and staff resulted in a libel action by lawyers for the orchestra and its chairman Anthony Camden. Private Eye settled out of court, admitting the items were false and paying damages.

In 1976 Boyden launched the Enigma Classics label with Peter Whiteside. The label started with just ten records, including a series of Beethoven piano sonata played by John Lill, but was successful and was purchased by WEA in 1978. Boyden afterwards went into musician management, founding the Manygate Management agency which represented, among others, John Ogdon. In 1992 he published Stick to the Music, a collection of industry anecdotes.

Boyden established the New Queen's Hall Orchestra (NQHO) in 1992, to produce music more in line with his ideals. The original orchestra had been active at the Queen's Hall in the early part of the 20th century, but had dissolved. Boyden liked to think he was continuing the traditions of the original orchestra which regularly played six concerts a week after only three rehearsals. His younger son, Matthew, was a conductor for the orchestra while also working as a barrister. Boyden secured the patronage of Camilla, Duchess of Cornwall for the orchestra. He also campaigned, unsuccessfully, for 30 years for a replacement Queen's Hall venue to feature his desired acoustic set-up of an oblong concert hall. Despite suffering from chronic asthma Boyden captained the NQHO cricket team.

Boyden was married for a third time in 2017, to Lindsey Erith. Boyden was a supporter of the Conservative Party and of Brexit, which was achieved in 2020. He supported the Wimbledon Arts Centre in London and the Storey's Field Centre near Cambridge.

== Musical opinions ==
Boyden was a critic of the perfectionism in contemporary orchestral recordings, with minor errors and coughs routinely edited out of tracks and individual notes replaced. In an article in The Spectator he described such techniques as allowing "non-entities ... to sound more technically assured than many of the greatest artists". He also decried those who "want to reduce music to a branch of engineering, to say it has to be nothing more or less than precise, accurate, in tune and together, then fine, the literal-minded can have a field day ... I think music is something far greater than that".

Boyden was concerned about the trend for musical instruments to become larger and louder and expressed his dislike of the "self-deafening" modern orchestra. In 1996 he produced a recording of Gustav Holst's The Planets made largely on instruments manufactured before its 1918 debut. Boyden was concerned that the composer's intentions could not be reflected on modern instruments. In his 60-year career in music Boyden spent only seven months (his tenure at the LSO), in the direct employment of a government-subsidised organisation. He later called for cuts to government music subsidies to orchestras.

== Death and legacy ==
Boyden died on 21 September 2021 from a skull fracture after falling in Cheltenham General Hospital where he was undergoing treatment for a neuroendocrine tumour.

The album John Boyden: A Celebration, was issued as a tribute in 2024 and includes a dedication to Queen Camilla, which she accepted. It comprised two compact discs of works by Ludwig van Beethoven and Franz Schubert that he had produced. It includes Beethoven's "Piano Sonata No. 21" performed by John Lill and Schubert's "Die schöne Müllerin" sung by Ian Partridge. Another piece was Schubert's "Trout Quintet" performed by musicians associated with NQHO.
