= National Youth Orchestra of Ireland =

- Youth orchestra
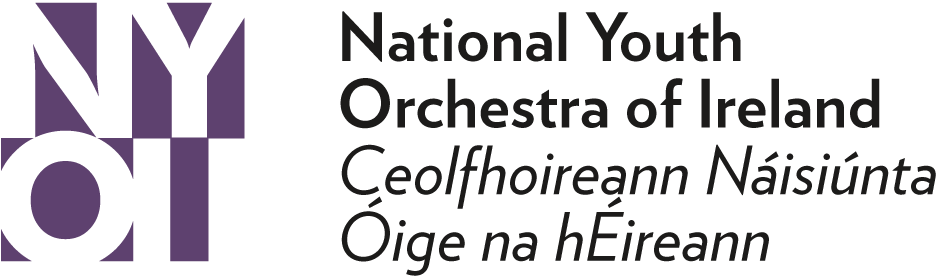
- Native name: Ceolfhoireann Náisiúnta Óige na hÉireann
- Short name: NYOI
- Founded: 1970
- Website: nyoi.ie

The National Youth Orchestra of Ireland (NYOI; Irish: Ceolfhoireann Náisiúnta Óige na hÉireann) is the national youth orchestra of Ireland, founded in 1970 by Olive Smith and the Music Association of Ireland.

It is a member of the European Federation of National Youth Orchestras.
