= Concertino for Harpsichord and String Orchestra (Leigh) =

1934 composition by Walter Leigh

Concertino for Harpsichord and String Orchestra is a short harpsichord concerto written in 1934 by English composer Walter Leigh. It was premiered by the English composer and pianist Elizabeth Poston.

There are three movements:

1. Allegro
2. Andante
3. Allegro vivace

In the first movement, a lively dialogue between soloist and orchestra culminates in a barred cadenza for the harpsichord, followed by a repeat of the opening statement. The Andante is a sarabande-like movement, in ABA form. The ten-bar theme stated by the soloist is repeated by the orchestra. In the B section, elements from the first theme are reassembled into new motives. The first theme is shared between cellos and violins on its return, with the harpsichord playing accompanying arpeggios. The last movement is in 6/8 and abounds in cross-rhythms; a number of short themes succeed each other rapidly. A short cadenza leads to a reprise incorporating themes from all three of the movements.

Piano has occasionally replaced harpsichord in performance, owing to the relative obscurity of the harpsichord at the time of composition, and the economic demands of publishing.

It has been recorded by Trevor Pinnock on Lyrita; George Malcolm on BBC radio classics; Colin Tilney on CBC; Neville Dilkes on EMI; Anna Paradiso on Barn Cottage Records (2012). A 1940s English Decca Records recording of Kathleen Long in the piano version has achieved compact disc rerelease on the Dutton label.

Length: c. 9 minutes.

It is published by Oxford University Press.
