= Beethoven Symphonies (Liszt) =

Transcriptions for solo piano by Franz Liszt

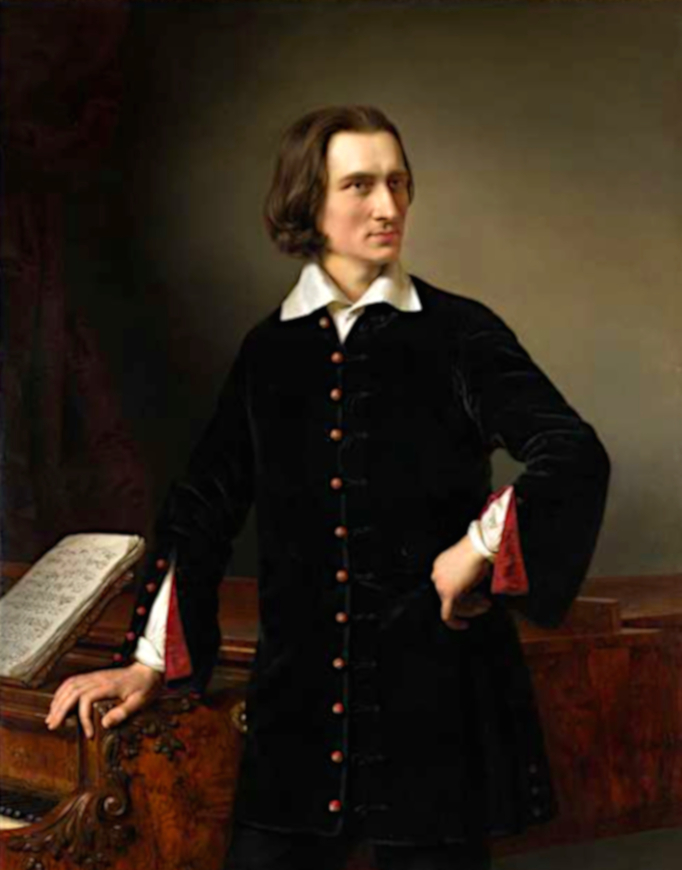
Franz Liszt, portrait by Hungarian painter Miklós Barabás, 1847

Beethoven Symphonies (French: Symphonies de Beethoven), S.464, are a set of nine transcriptions for solo piano by Franz Liszt of Ludwig van Beethoven's symphonies 1–9. They are among the most technically demanding piano music ever written.

== History ==
By 1837, Liszt appears to have completed the transcriptions of the fifth, sixth and seventh symphonies, of which the fifth and sixth were published by Breitkopf & Härtel and the seventh by Tobias Haslinger. In 1843, he arranged the third movement of the Third Symphony, which was later published by Pietro Mechetti in 1850. Liszt was paid 8 francs per page by Breitkopf & Härtel, who first requested two symphonies to be transcribed. During his 1840 travels in Europe he might have given the transcribed symphonies some publicity by playing them at his concerts. With three symphonies transcribed, Liszt set aside the work for another 23 years. It was not until 1863 that Breitkopf & Härtel suggested to Liszt that he transcribe the complete set for a future publication. For this work, Liszt recycled his previous transcriptions by simplifying passages, stating that "the more intimately acquainted one becomes with Beethoven, the more one clings to certain singularities and finds that even insignificant details are not without their value". He would note down the names of the orchestral instruments for the pianist to imitate, and also add pedal marks and fingerings for amateurs and sight readers.

When Liszt began work transcribing the ninth symphony, he expressed that "after a great deal of experimentation in various directions, I was unable to deny the utter impossibility of even a partially satisfactory and effective arrangement of the 4th movement. I hope you will not take it amiss if I dispense with this and regard my arrangements of the Beethoven symphonies as complete at the end of the 3rd movement of the Ninth." (He had in fact completed a transcription of the Ninth Symphony for two pianos in 1850.) Nevertheless, he made another attempt after an expressive letter from Breitkopf & Härtel, and expressed "the range achieved by the pianoforte in recent years as a result of progress both in playing technique and in terms of mechanical improvements enables more and better things to be achieved than was previously possible. Through the immense development of its harmonic power the piano is trying increasingly to adopt all orchestral compositions. In the compass of its seven octaves it is able, with only a few exceptions, to reproduce all the characteristics, all the combination, all the forms of the deepest and most profound works of music. It was with this intention that I embark on the work which I now present to the world."

The full set of transcriptions was finally published in 1865 and dedicated to Hans von Bülow. The original publication of the fifth and sixth symphonies had been dedicated to the painter and amateur violinist Jean-Auguste-Dominique Ingres.

== Reception and recordings ==
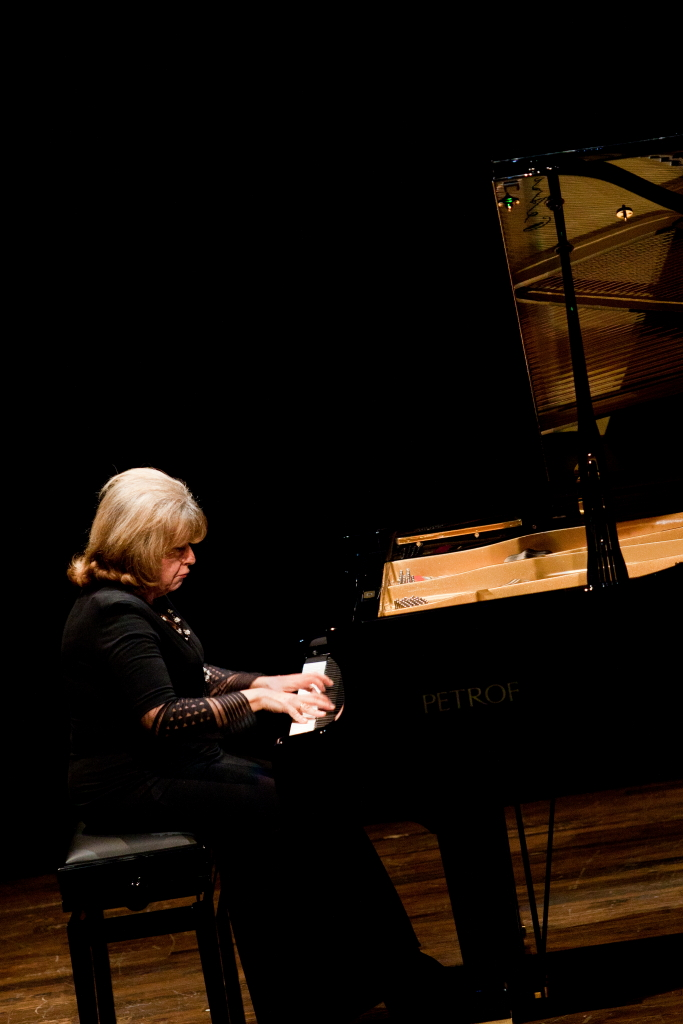
İdil Biret, the first musician to record the complete symphony transcriptions

Vladimir Horowitz, in a 1988 interview, stated "I deeply regret never having played Liszt's arrangements of the Beethoven symphonies in public – these are the greatest works for the piano – tremendous works – every note of the symphonies is in the Liszt works."

Liszt's Beethoven Symphony transcriptions are little known outside serious musical circles, and were in relative obscurity for over 100 years after their publication. It remains a mystery why none of Liszt's pupils performed or recorded these works. The first recording of any of them was not until 1967, when Glenn Gould recorded the Fifth and Sixth Symphonies. İdil Biret became the first pianist to record the complete cycle, between July 1985 and April 1986. Subsequently, Cyprien Katsaris, Leslie Howard, Konstantin Scherbakov, Yury Martynov and Hinrich Alpers have also recorded all nine.

In February 1971 at Trinity College, Dublin, Irish pianist Charles Lynch played the entire set of Liszt's transcriptions of Beethoven's symphonies over four successive Saturday evenings. The Irish Times critic, Charles Acton, paid tribute to Lynch's achievement:

It is doubtful if Liszt himself ever played them as a series. Since his day, individual virtuosi have played individual symphonies but it is possible that Charles Lynch is the first person who has played all of them as a public series – and all in four weeks. On that score we may be in the presence of a historical event. We are certainly in the presence of a quite tremendous physical, mental, emotional, and intellectual feat.

İdil Biret performed all nine symphonies at the 1986 Montpellier Festival in four recitals on 26–27 July and 2–3 August.

In a 2012 interview, Cyprien Katsaris, after performing Liszt's transcription of the 3rd Symphony Eroica publicly for the 79th time, said he "... called [his] agent and told him to change all the programs because [he] could not play it anymore ..."; he then continued: "... it helps you with anything that you play after it!"

Frederic Chiu has recorded the 5th and 7th Symphonies for Centaur Records. In his program notes he suggests that "Liszt's piano scores must therefore be taken as a sort of gospel in regards to Beethoven's intentions with the Symphonies" because of Liszt's unique perspective, having met Beethoven in person, having heard collaborators and contemporaries of Beethoven perform the Symphonies, having studied and performed the works both as a pianist/transcriber and as a conductor in Weimar. No one in history could claim to have as much exposure, insight and journalistic integrity as regards Beethoven's intentions around the Symphonies.

Giovanni Bellucci recorded his nine symphonies and his recording was released on Brilliant Classics on Youtube.

Musicologist Dr. Alan Walker stated that Liszt's Beethoven Symphony transcriptions "are arguably the greatest work of transcription ever completed in the history of music."
