= Olive Smith =

Olive Smith (19 June 1906 – 12 September 1993) was a lifelong campaigner on behalf of classical music in Ireland. She co-founded the Music Association of Ireland, was the first director of the National Youth Orchestra of Ireland, and was a conductor of the Olivian Singers and the Culwick Choral Society.

== Early life ==
Born Mabel Olive Richardson, she was the third daughter of a Dublin merchant, Charles E. Richardson and his wife, Alice Maud Metcalfe. The family lived in Rathgar. Olive was educated at Alexandra College and Trinity College Dublin. In 1932, she married Lyall Gilchrist Smith, a chemist.

== Career in music ==
Smith combined her full-time job as an administrator in Trinity College with her voluntary work in a variety of roles in Ireland's musical life.

In 1948, Smith co-founded the Music Association of Ireland and became its first treasurer. Over the following three decades, she held in turn each position on the MAI's management committee, including chairman, and was responsible for many of the association's initiatives to promote classical music, especially among young people. In July 1978, after her term as chairman had ended, Smith was awarded an honorary doctorate by Trinity College, Dublin, in recognition of her "devoted service to the Music Association of Ireland".

In May 1957, Smith founded the Olivian Singers, a female choir, which she conducted at their inaugural concert on January 6, 1958, in Alexandra College. In March 1963, the Olivian Singers participated in the first performance in Ireland of Benjamin Britten's War Requiem, which took place in St. Patrick's Cathedral, Dublin. For several years in the early-1960s, Smith was also chorus mistress of the Culwick Choral Society, a Dublin choir founded in 1898. She was succeeded in that role by Seóirse Bodley.

In 1970, Smith and violinist Hugh Maguire founded the Irish Youth Orchestra (now the National Youth Orchestra of Ireland). She was the orchestra's first director until her retirement from that position in 1982.

Smith was appointed to the Cultural Relations Committee in January 1982. Set up in 1949, the committee advised the Minister for Foreign Affairs on the administration of funds allocated for the development of cultural relations with other countries.

== Personal life ==
Smith's husband, Lyall, predeceased her in January 1969. They had a daughter, Gillian. Olive Smith died in Highfield Private Hospital aged 87 and is buried in Enniskerry churchyard.
