= Music Association of Ireland =

The Music Association of Ireland (MAI) was set up in 1948 to improve the position of classical music within the cultural life of Ireland. It was instrumental in setting up the National Youth Orchestra of Ireland and played a leading role in the long-running campaign to establish Ireland's National Concert Hall. In 2007, the association changed its name to Friends of Classical Music.

== Early years ==
In May 1948 it was announced that a new body, to be known as the Music Association of Ireland, was being set up to promote classical music in Ireland. The new association had six objectives:

1. to further musical education
2. to improve conditions for composers and musicians
3. to help establish a national concert hall
4. to lobby on matters of music policy
5. to encourage musical groups throughout the country
6. to organise concerts and lectures.

A governing council of thirteen individuals was set up to oversee the running of the association. Among its members were composers, Brian Boydell, Aloys Fleischman, and Frederick May. A small management committee was also appointed comprising Olive Smith, honorary treasurer, and Michael McMullin, honorary secretary.

Six months after its formation the MAI had gained only eighty three members. Nevertheless, it immediately began to lobby government for greater financial support for live performances, particularly those given by the Radio Éireann Symphony Orchestra

In 1950 the MAI undertook its greatest challenge to date when it organised a festival of concerts and lectures to commemorate the bicentenary of the death of Johann Sebastian Bach. For several months, members raised funds and tried to source Baroque instruments, such as a harpsichord, not readily available in Ireland. The festival took place between September and November 1950 in various Dublin venues and featured local and international performers. For instance, English bass, Owen Brannigan, sang in the B Minor Mass, and the principal and second trumpeters of the London Symphony Orchestra were engaged to play the D trumpets in the same work. While individual aspects of performance were criticised, the initiative was generally welcomed.

== Activities ==
When the MAI celebrated its twentieth anniversary in 1968, membership had risen to 600 and founder-member Brian Boydell expressed satisfaction with the progress made by the association in the fulfilment of its objectives. Under the enthusiastic leadership of Olive Smith, who chaired the association's management committee until 1978, the MAI undertook a variety of initiatives to promote classical music in Ireland.

=== Ógra Ceoil ===
In October 1967, the MAI set up a body named Ógra Ceoil ("Musical Youth") to encourage participation in music by young people. Members could avail of reduced rates for tickets to concerts and recitals and within a few months 800 young people aged between fourteen and twenty five had joined the new body. In January 1972, Ógra Ceoil launched the Irish Youth Orchestra at its inaugural concert in Trinity College, Dublin. The National Youth Orchestra of Ireland, as it is now known, continues to perform regularly in Ireland and abroad.

=== National Concert Hall ===
The MAI began its campaign for a national concert hall in 1951. In 1960, music critic Charles Acton put the weight of his prominent position at The Irish Times behind the effort. At that point, a brand new building was being mooted, to be located opposite Christ Church Cathedral in Dublin. In 1964, the government announced that a new national concert hall would be built in Dublin as a memorial to the late American president, John F. Kennedy. When, by 1973, no progress had been made, the association collected 10,000 signatures in support of a new concert hall and submitted a petition to the Department of Finance. Finally, in September 1981, the association's efforts were crowned with success when the country's new National Concert Hall opened in Earlsfort Terrace in Dublin.

== Concerts ==
Among the notable artists who performed in Ireland under the auspices of the MAI were:

- Benjamin Britten and Peter Pears (1960)
- Victoria de los Ángeles (1969)
- Yvonne Loriod (1976)

In addition to one-off concerts, the association also organised a number of annual music festivals, including the Dublin Festival of 20th Century Music, the Festival in Great Irish Houses, and the Dublin Organ Festival. However, by the late 1980s, the association was no longer able to support these events when funding from the Arts Council ceased.

=== Counterpoint and Soundpost ===
Starting in the late-1960s, the MAI issued a periodical for members entitled Counterpoint. It covered topics relevant to the Irish classical music scene and included a comprehensive diary of forthcoming concerts and other musical events throughout the country. In April 1981, the association replaced Counterpoint with a new bi-monthly magazine named Soundpost. Unlike its predecessor, Soundpost was available to the general public via an annual subscription. In addition to its coverage of classical music, the magazine also included features on folk music and jazz. In 1985, the MAI ceased publication of Soundpost due to lack of funds.

== Current status ==
Starting in 1985, the MAI came under increased scrutiny by the Arts Council, whose funding enabled the association to carry out many of its activities. In 1987, the Arts Council cut its subvention to the MAI substantially, citing a lack of confidence in the way the association managed its affairs. Within a few years the MAI, in the words of music critic, Ian Fox, had 'drifted to the sideline'. Although the association continued to organise concerts and lectures into the early years of the third millennium, its overall impact on Irish musical life has been considerably diminished. In 2007, the association changed its name to Friends of Classical Music.
