= V.C. Clinton-Baddeley =

British writer (1900–1970)

Victor Vaughan Reynolds Geraint Clinton-Baddeley (1900 – 1970), known as V.C Clinton-Baddeley, was a British playwright, actor, elocutionist and writer.

Born in Budleigh Salterton, Devon, Clinton-Baddeley was the son of the Rev. H Clinton Clinton-Baddeley, and the cousin of actresses Angela and Hermione Baddeley. He was educated at Sherborne School and Jesus College, Cambridge. For a time he was employed as the editor of the modern history section of the Encyclopaedia Britannica, but in the late 1920s he turned to acting. During the 1920s and 1930s he became widely known for his parts in BBC radio plays, and for his serial readings of Dickens and other novels. He also worked with W. B. Yeats as his poetry reader.

As well as plays his works include pantomimes and operettas (collaborating with composers including Gavin Gordon, Walter Leigh and Phyllis Tate), five detective novels, and literary and theatre non-fiction. The detective novels all feature series character Dr. R. V. Davie. He served as both chairman and president of the Society for Theatre Research.

Clinton-Baddeley also founded Jupiter Recordings Ltd, a company that produced spoken word and poetry set to music, in 1958. The London bookseller Bernard Stone (Turret Books) and amateur composer Wallace Southam were also involved. The recordings were made either by the poets themselves, or by actors and scholars. Jupiter Recordings featured poetry readings by Ted Hughes, Thom Gunn, and Philip Larkin among many others. The company was closed in 1970, though a few recordings continued to be released.

His final detective novel, To Study a Long Silence, was left unfinished at his death in August 1970. It was completed by his nephew Mark Goullet.

== Published works ==
=== Plays ===
- Footsteps in the Night, with C. Fraser-Simpson (1933)
- The Billiard-Room Mystery; or, Who D'you Think Did It: A Murder Mystery in Two Acts (1934)
- Aladdin (London, 1935)
- The Babes in the Wood: A Cynical Pantomime in One Act
- Sherborne Story: A Chronicle Play (1950)
- Sleeping Beauty (London, 1959)

=== Detective novels ===
- Death's Bright Dart (Gollancz, 1967)
- My Foe Outstretch'd Beneath the Tree (Gollancz, 1968)
- Only a Matter of Time (Gollancz, 1969)
- No Case for the Police (Gollancz, 1970)
- To Study a Long Silence (Gollancz, 1972)

=== Other books ===
- Devon (London, 1925)
- The Split in the Cabinet (1938)
- Words for Music (Cambridge University Press, 1941)
- The Burlesque Tradition in the English Theatre after 1660 (Methuen, 1952)
- All Right on the Night (Putnam, 1954)
- The Jupiter Book of Verse (1962), introduction by V. C. Clinton-Baddeley
- Some Pantomime Pedigrees (Society for Theatre Research, London, 1963)

=== Musical pantomime and operetta ===
- Aladdin, or Love Will Find Out the Way, operetta, music by Walter Leigh, Lyric Theatre Hammersmith, December 1931
- Jolly Roger, or the Admiral's Daughter, comic opera, music by Walter Leigh, Manchester Opera House, 13 February 1933
- The Pride of the Regiment, or Cashiered for his Country, comic opera, with Scobie Mackenzie, music by Walter Leigh (1932)
- Cinderella; Or, Love Makes the World Go Round, a pantomime with music by Gavin Gordon and Walter Leigh (1952)
- Jack and the beanstalk, or, Love conquers all, a pantomime with music by Gavin Gordon (1955)
- Dick Whittington, or, Love is the Key that Opens Every Door, music by Gavin Gordon (London and Sydney, 1959)
- The What D'ye Call it: An Opera, based on a farce by John Gay, music by Phyllis Tate (Oxford, 1966)
- Play Songs for Infants, with composer Wallace Southam (1967)

=== Selected Jupiter recordings ===
- A Junior Anthology of English Verse, 3 10 inch LPs, JUR OOB1 (1958)
- The Jupiter Anthology Of 20th Century English Poetry 2 LPs, JUR OOA1 (1959)
- Poets Reading No. 1: Edith Sitwell & C. Day Lewis, 7 inch EP, JEP OOC1 (1959)
- The Jupiter Book of Ballads, LP, JUR OOA3 (1960)
- Conversation Pieces, LP, Jupiter JUR 00A4 (1961)
- Poets Reading No. 7: Kingsley Amis & Thomas Blackburn, 7 inch EP, JEP OC29 (1962)
- Here Today: Poems by 45 Contemporary Authors, 2 LPs, JUR OOA6/7 (1963)
- Lawrence Durrell – Greek Poems, 7 inch EP, JEP OC28 (1963)
- The London Library of Recorded English, LP, JUR 00A9 (1964)
- Poems by W.B. Yeats & Poems for Several Voices, LP, JUR OOB2 (re-issue, 1973)
