= Walter Leigh =

English composer

Walter Leigh (22 June 1905 – 12 June 1942) was an English composer. Leigh is best known for his Concertino for harpsichord and string orchestra, written in 1934. Other famous works include the overture Agincourt and The Frogs of Aristophanes for chorus and orchestra. He wrote music for documentary films and there is an unfinished sketch for a symphony.

== Career ==
Walter Leigh was born in Wimbledon. His first teacher was Harold Darke, with whom he worked from the age of eight until he was seventeen. He went to Christ's College, Cambridge, studying composition with Cyril Rootham and graduating in 1926. For two years thereafter, he studied composition under Paul Hindemith at the Berlin Hochschule für Musik.

In 1930, Leigh declined a teaching job and set about earning a living by accepting small commissions and becoming increasingly involved with the theatre. With V.C. Clinton-Baddeley he wrote a pantomime for the Festival Theatre at Cambridge, and two comic operas, the second of which, Jolly Roger, ran for six months at the Savoy Theatre in London, with a cast headed by George Robey. He composed an elaborate score for Basil Wright's documentary film The Song of Ceylon and the concert overture Agincourt, commissioned by the BBC in celebration of King George V's Silver Jubilee. The Harpsichord Concertino is one of a number of chamber works of the period: Grove describes it as an elegant and concise work, more French than German in its spare-noted neo-classicism, the keyboard writing showing signs of Ravel's influence.

For the Cambridge production of The Frogs in 1936, Leigh produced another score precision-made for the occasion. The music for A Midsummer Night's Dream was written for an open-air schools performance at Weimar in 1936; it is scored for flute, clarinet, trumpet, strings and harpsichord. Music for String Orchestra is a work written sympathetically for amateurs in four movements: Adagio – Vivo – Lento – Allegro. The only other major commission Leigh undertook before the outbreak of war was to produce the music for Herbert Farjeon's intimate revue Nine Sharp (1938).

Leigh typically required external stimulus to motivate his composition, and has been described as "a craftsman-composer of a type more common in the 18th century than the 20th century...almost all his music was written for immediate use".

The majority of the orchestral and chamber works have been recorded on the Lyrita and Dutton Epoch labels. The piano music and some art songs were recorded on the Tremula label. The Harpsichord Concertino was recorded by Kathleen Long in 1946 using a piano.

== Death ==
In 1941, during the Second World War, he joined the British Army and served as a trooper with the Royal Armoured Corps, 4th Queen's Own Hussars. He was killed in action near Tobruk, Libya in 1942, just before his 37th birthday, leaving a widow, Marion, and three children, Julian, Veronica and Andrew, who had been sent to Canada to escape the London Blitz.

An obituary in The Times credits Leigh as being "the first British composer to undertake a complete study of the many problems relating to the sound-track in the production of films", and cites the score for The Song of Ceylon as "a classic example of the creative use of music and sound in relation to the visuals on the screen."

== Compositions ==
Stage

- Aladdin, or Love Will Find Out the Way (1931); pantomime
- The Pride of the Regiment, or Cashiered for His Country (1932); comic operetta; book by Scobie Mackenzie and V.C. Clinton-Baddeley
- Jolly Roger, or The Admiral's Daughter (1933); comic opera in 3 Acts; book by Scobie Mackenzie and V.C. Clinton-Baddeley; premièred at the Savoy Theatre
- Victoria Regina (1935); premièred at the Broadhurst Theatre on Broadway
- Nine Sharp (1938); musical revue
- The Little Revue (1939)

Incidental music

- Charlemagne (1935); music for the radio play
- The Frogs (1936); incidental music for the play by Aristophanes; Oxford University Press
- A Midsummer Night's Dream (1936); incidental music for the William Shakespeare comedy

Orchestra

- Music for String Orchestra (1931); Wilhelm Hansen Verlag; Kalmus Music
- Three Pieces for Amateur Orchestra (1929)
- Agincourt, "Jubilee Overture" for Orchestra (1935); Oxford University Press

Concertante

- Concertino for Harpsichord (or Piano) and String Orchestra (1934); Oxford University Press; Kalmus Music

Chamber music

- Reverie for Violin and Piano (1922)
- Romance for 2 Violins, Viola, Cello and Piano
- Student String Quartet (1929)
- Three Movements for String Quartet (1929); Wilhelm Hansen Verlag
- Sonatina for Viola and Piano (1930); Comus Edition
- Trio for Flute, Oboe and Piano (1935); Oxford University Press
- Sonatina for Treble Recorder (or Flute) and Piano (1939); Edition Schott
- Air for Treble Recorder and Piano; Forsyth Brothers Ltd.

Piano

- Three Machine Dances (1924)
- Piano Sonata (1925–26)
- Music for Three Pianos (1932)
- Eclogue for Piano (1940); Banks Music Publication
- Three Waltzes for 2 Pianos
- Polka for Piano
- Five Playtime Pieces; Animus Music Publishing
- Piano Album for Piano (1929)

Vocal

- Peculiar Noises for Voice and Piano (1938); words by Herbert Farjeon
- The Three Roundels; words by Dorothy Frances Bloomfield

Film music

- His Lordship (1932)
- The Song of Ceylon (1934)
- Pett and Pott: A Fairy Story of the Suburbs (1934)
- The Face of Scotland (1938)
- Man of the Alps (1939)
- Squadron 992 (1939)
- Table d'Hote (1939); for television
- The Fourth Estate: A Film of a British Newspaper (1940)
