= Peers Coetmore =

English cellist (1905–1976)

- Born: Kathleen Peers Coetmore Jones; 1905
- Died: 1976 (aged 70–71); Melbourne, Australia
- Education: Royal Academy of Music
- Occupation: Cellist
- Spouses: Ernest John Moeran (m. 1945; died 1950) (Maurice) Walter Knott (m. 1950)

Peers Coetmore (born Kathleen Peers Coetmore Jones; October 1905 – July 1976) was an English cellist. She spent her early years in Spilsby in Lincolnshire.

== Early life ==
Peers was born Kathleen Peers Coetmore Jones. She studied at the Royal Academy of Music (winning the Piatti Prize for cellists in 1924) and took lessons from Maurice Eisenberg, Emanuel Feuermann and Maurice Maréchal. In the 1930s her address was The Studio, 159a Mill Lane, London NW6.

== Career ==
She toured England, Eire, Germany, Holland, Egypt, Palestine and Syria, and performed with the BBC, Liverpool Philharmonic and Hallé orchestras. Among her students (between 1938 and 1941) was Doreen Carwithen.

In 1945 she married the composer E.J. Moeran and was the dedicatee of his Cello Concerto and his Cello Sonata. She gave the premiere performance of both these works: the Cello Concerto on 25 November 1945 in Dublin, and the Sonata on May 1947, also in Dublin, with the pianist Charles Lynch. Her recordings of both works are available on CD on the Lyrita imprint [UK]. There is also a surviving recording of her live performance of the Cello Concerto from People’s Palace, Mile End, broadcast on 10 April 1946.

After Moeran's death in 1950, she married (Maurice) Walter Knott (1922–2003) and lived in Melbourne, Australia, where she taught at the Victorian College of the Arts. She died in July 1976. In her will, she made a bequest of $20,000 to the College:

...for the purpose of founding a Scholarship to be known as "The Peers Coetmore Scholarship" to be awarded from time to time to the cello student adjudged to be the worthiest student by the Board of Studies to enable such student to engage in the further study of the cello for a period of one, two or three years and whether within the Commonwealth of Australia or overseas as the said Board of Studies may in its unfettered discretion determine.

The first recipient of this Scholarship was Jacqueline Johnson.

She also bequeathed to the College her 1723 Goffriller cello and some of Moeran's unpublished musical scores, including his unfinished Second Symphony in E-flat.

After her death, Walter Knott arranged for Wesley College, Melbourne to name its orchestra the Coetmore Orchestra in her honour. Walter Knott was particularly associated with the college and bequeathed his own estate to it.
