= The Fourth Estate (film) =

The Fourth Estate: A Film of a British Newspaper
- Directed by: Paul Rotha
- Written by: Paul Rotha, Basil Wright, Carl Mayer
- Produced by: Patrick Moyna
- Narrated by: Geoffrey Bell, Nicholas Hannen, Dennis Arundell
- Cinematography: James E. Rogers, Harry Rignold, A.E. Jeakins
- Music by: Walter Leigh
- Release date: 1940
- Running time: 5,659 feet (63 minutes at 24fps)
- Country: United Kingdom
- Language: English

The Fourth Estate: A Film of a British Newspaper is a 1940 documentary film directed by Paul Rotha. The film was sponsored by the owners of The Times, and depicts the preparation and production of a day's edition of the newspaper.

The film is notable for the fact that it went unreleased (apart from a small number of private screenings for the sponsor and critics). The Second World War broke out while it was in production, and the explanation for The Fourth Estate having been buried most commonly given by historians of the Documentary Movement is that following the film's completion, the Ministry of Information were reluctant to sanction its release on the grounds that it depicted life in peacetime London, which would no longer be accepted by viewers as realistic. However, Rotha himself claimed that the film's sponsor was reluctant to release The Fourth Estate in the belief that it implicitly criticised The Times from a leftist perspective, portraying it as the mouthpiece of the establishment.

Another point of interest is that Carl Mayer, the Jewish and prominent Weimar screenwriter, who by this time was living in Britain as an exile from the Nazis, acted as a 'scenario consultant' to the film.

In 2012, the first public screening of the full film was at the University of Leeds using film print from the archive of the British Film Institute (BFI).
