= Jack Coles =

- Coles at the Royal Festival Hall in 1958

Background information
- Birth name: John Robert Coles
- Also known as: Paul Stewart, Paul Vincent
- Born: 28 April 1914; London, England
- Died: 24 April 1991 (aged 76); London, England
- Genres: Light music
- Occupations: Arranger; trumpeter; composer; conductor
- Instruments: Trumpet
- Years active: 1933–1991

John Robert Coles (28 April 1914 – 24 April 1991) was a British composer, trumpeter, arranger, and conductor of light music, best known for his composition Tyrolean Tango. Coles often composed under the pen-name 'Paul Stewart' and 'Paul Vincent'.

== Early life and education ==
Jack Coles was born in London and began music at an early age. After studying the trumpet at the Royal Military School of Music from 1933 to 1934 and winning the "Gold Cup" for best all-round pupil, Coles played with leading British dance bands until the outbreak of war in 1939, when he enlisted in the King's Royal Rifle Corps.

== Career ==
After his time in the Rifle Corps, Coles enrolled in the British Band of the Allied Expeditionary Forces (AEF), where he played trumpet and arranged for its conductor, George Melachrino. In 1946, Coles started broadcasting for the BBC Radio with the 'Music Masters', a short-lived ten-piece dance band. He went on to form, at the request of the BBC, a larger, 22-piece light orchestra named 'Jack Coles and his Orchestre Moderne' which lasted over a decade. This orchestra did over 200 broadcasts for BBC Radio, appearing in light orchestral programs such as 'Melody Hour', 'Morning Music' and, 'Music While You Work'. In 1958, Coles was invited to the BBC Festival of Light Music at the Royal Festival Hall in London. By this time, he was guest-conducting for various BBC Regional Light Orchestras and touring Holland with the BBC Studio Choir. One of these regional orchestras, the BBC Midland Light Orchestra (MLO), had been without a permanent conductor since early 1959. In August of the following year, the BBC appointed Coles as the principal conductor of the MLO, a post he held until 1972.

== Music ==
=== Style ===
Throughout the 20th century, Coles composed and arranged light orchestral music for radio, television, film and stage productions. He evolved a distinctly modern rhythmic style and composed both contemporary light music and popular standards of the time. His arrangements incorporated more and more jazz as time went on, which contrasted the traditional style of light music conducted by Gilbert Vinter (a co-conductor of the Midland Light Orchestra until 1969).

Coles in 1966

Coles' musical taste ranged from swing to operatic and symphonic works.

=== Compositions ===
Coles' best known composition, "Tyrolean Tango", written under the pen-name of Paul Stewart, was recorded in England by George Melachrino and in the United States by Duke Ellington, re-titled "The Echo Tango".

His other numerous compositions include:

- Fan Tan, The Girl From Cadiz, Parakeets and Peacocks, Positano, Procida, Sparky, Cowbell Polka and Joy Ride
- A Day at the Zoo, Dance of the Dragonflies, Casbah, Puppet March, Seaside Special and Riverboat Serenade
- Mexican Serenade, Dude Ranch, Dance of the Pan-pipes and Celebration Waltz
- Gentle Persuasion, The Nightrider and Elegy

== Retirement and death ==
In 1972, Coles retired to Positano, Italy. However, he returned to London around ten years later and conducted in two editions of a revived series of 'Music While You Work' for BBC Radio. Coles died on 24 April 1991, four days before his 77th birthday.

== Legacy ==
Coles' musicianship, program-building and conducting ability were held in high regard by the BBC and earned him a favorable reputation. Coles was also known for his generosity, as he often aided struggling musicians financially.
