= Ernest John Moeran =

English composer (1894–1950)

- Ernest John Moeran
- Born: Ernest John Smeed Moeran; 31 December 1894; Heston, Middlesex, England
- Died: 1 December 1950 (aged 55); Kenmare, County Kerry, Ireland
- Education: Royal College of Music
- Occupations: Composer, teacher
- Spouse: Peers Coetmore (m. 1945)
- Military career
- Allegiance: United Kingdom
- Branch: British Army
- Service years: 1914–1919
- Rank: Second Lieutenant (1915)
- Unit: Royal Norfolk Regiment
- Conflicts: Second Battle of Bullecourt (1917)

Ernest John Smeed Moeran (/ˈmɔːrən/; 31 December 1894 – 1 December 1950) was an Anglo-Irish composer whose work was strongly influenced by English and Irish folk music of which he was an assiduous collector. His oeuvre includes orchestral pieces, concertos, chamber and keyboard works, and a number of choral and song cycles as well as individual songs.

The son of a clergyman, Moeran studied at the Royal College of Music under Charles Villiers Stanford before service in the army during the First World War, in which he was wounded. After the war he was a pupil of John Ireland, and quickly established a reputation as a composer of promise with a number of well-received works. From 1925 to 1928 he shared a cottage with the composer Peter Warlock; the bohemian lifestyle and heavy drinking during this period interrupted his creativity for a while, and sowed the seeds of the alcoholism that would blight his later life. He resumed composing in the 1930s, and re-established his reputation with a series of major works, including a symphony and a violin concerto. From 1934 onwards he spent much of his time in Ireland, mainly in the coastal town of Kenmare.

In 1945 Moeran married the cellist Peers Coetmore, and for her he composed several works for cello. The marriage was not destined to last, and Moeran's final years were lonely. He died at Kenmare on 1 December 1950, having fallen into the water after suffering a cerebral haemorrhage. A second symphony was left unfinished at the time of his death. Composer Anthony Payne declared that "Moeran occupied a minor place in the music of his time, but his meticulously polished and ready technique is unsurpassed among his British contemporaries. This craftsmanship is evident in the clarity of his textures and processes, and in the superb sonority of his orchestral writing".

== Life ==
=== Early life ===
Moeran was born on 31 December 1894, at the Spring Grove vicarage, Heston, Middlesex, the second son of an Anglo-Irish clergyman, The Rev. Joseph William Wright Moeran, vicar of St Mary's, Spring Grove, and Ada Esther Smeed, née Whall, who came from Norfolk. Joseph subsequently served in several country parishes in southern and eastern England, including Salhouse in Norfolk, before his retirement on health grounds when Ernest was 13. The household was cultured; Ada was a talented pianist and singer, and Ernest began music lessons from the age of five or six. His initial education was under a governess at home, after which, in 1904, he attended Suffield Park preparatory school in Cromer. In 1908 he went to Uppingham School, where he studied music under Robert Sterndale Bennett, grandson of the composer William Sterndale Bennett. He became a proficient pianist, and learned the violin sufficiently to be able to perform in chamber groups; he also began to compose. In 1913 he entered the Royal College of Music (RCM), initially as a piano student, but switching to composition under Charles Villiers Stanford after his first year. He also became a member of the Oxford and Cambridge Musical Club, an important body whose members included Vaughan Williams, George Butterworth and Adrian Boult; Parry and Elgar were honorary members. A few sketches of piano compositions attempted in this prewar RCM period survive in manuscript form.

=== First World War ===
Moeran was 19 when his studies at the RCM were interrupted in August 1914 by the outbreak of the First World War. He enlisted as a motor cycle dispatch rider in the 6th (cyclist) battalion of the Royal Norfolk Regiment, and the following year was commissioned second lieutenant. He did not altogether abandon his musical activities; on leaves in Norfolk, he began to collect folk music. In early 1917 his unit was sent to France, and on 3 May, during the Second Battle of Bullecourt, he received a wound in the head. According to several accounts, this wound required emergency surgery, including the insertion of a metal plate into the skull, and commentators have attributed Moeran's later instabilities and erratic behaviour, and his eventual development of alcoholism, to the primitive surgery and after-effects of this wound. However, other evidence suggests that the wound was less severe, that no metal plate was necessary, and that he made a rapid recovery. He was reported, in August 1917, as performing a very demanding piano piece at a London concert, indicating that he was in a reasonable state of fitness at that time.

After a period of convalescence he returned to military duty, and saw out the rest of the war in Ireland, at Boyle, County Roscommon, attached to a transport section of the Royal Irish Constabulary. He used this period in Ireland to engage with his Irish roots, and spent time collecting folk songs. In London, just before his discharge from the army in January 1919, Moeran met the composer Arnold Bax, who described him at that time "as charming and as good-looking a young officer as one could hope to meet".

=== Emerging composer ===
Following demobilisation in January 1919, Moeran returned to England. Some accounts report that he was briefly employed as a music master at his old school, Uppingham, but there is no evidence from the school for this. He appears to have returned to Ireland for a while before resuming his studies at the RCM, under John Ireland. His association with the RCM did not last long, but he continued to receive tuition in composition from John Ireland in a private capacity. Moeran's biographer Geoffrey Self observes that from this point "the main influences to be heard in his music were now in place: his teacher, his Irish and East Anglian heritages, and his love of rural England."

An allowance from his mother relieved Moeran from the necessity of earning a living, and with this financial independence he was able to devote his time to study and composition. The Oxford & Cambridge Musical Club gave him the means by which his works could be performed. In five productive years following the end of the war, he established his reputation as a composer with a steady stream of works across a range of genres. According to the critic Herbert Foss, these early pieces display a fluency that was often absent in later years. They include numerous songs, a number of piano and chamber works and, on a larger canvas, his first attempts at orchestral writing, the symphonic In The Mountain Country and two Rhapsodies. These early orchestral pieces indicate the influences of Delius and Vaughan Williams, but also demonstrate the emergence of a distinct, individual voice.

During this period, Moeran collected many folk tunes from rural pubs in Norfolk. His contribution to this area of work was recognised in 1923, when he was elected to the committee of the Folksong Society. As his reputation grew, he formed important friendships with leading figures on the musical scene, among whom was Hamilton Harty, who conducted a performance of Moeran's second orchestral Rhapsody and afterwards commissioned a symphony from the young composer. Moeran struggled with this challenge, but at this stage in his career was unable to deliver to his own satisfaction, and the project was set aside for the time being. Another important friendship formed around this time was with the writer, critic and composer Philip Heseltine (better known by his pseudonym Peter Warlock), Moeran's exact contemporary and like him a prolific songwriter. Heseltine was a great admirer of Moeran; in a 1924 review of the latter's early work, he wrote: "[T]here is no British composer from whom we may more confidently expect work of sound and enduring quality in the next ten years than from Jack Moeran; there is certainly no one of his years who has as yet achieved so much".

=== Heseltine and Eynsford ===
The friendship between Moeran and Heseltine deepened, and in 1925 they rented a cottage at Eynsford in Kent, together with the artist Hal Collins. The cottage attracted many visitors from the musical and artistic worlds, and soon became notorious as a centre for wild parties and other extravagances, involving heavy drinking. The excessive alcoholic consumption seemed to have little effect on Heseltine, who continued to work productively, but the opposite was true of Moeran, whose creativity soon began to suffer. He found it difficult to cope with the distractions provided by the cottage; his compositional output tailed off and finally ceased altogether, and he dropped out of the London musical scene, no longer attending the Oxford and Cambridge Musical Club. Furthermore, he was falling into alcoholism, and was also under the spell of Heseltine's stronger personality. Moeran later admitted a loss of faith in his abilities, finding that the longer he delayed, the harder it was to resume work.

The few works completed during the Eynsford years (1925–1928) include his single collaboration with Heseltine, a drinking song called "Maltworms", written for performance at a drama festival at the nearby village of Shoreham. Heseltine wrote a tune for the first two lines, Moeran continued with the next lines, and so on. Parts were scored for the village brass band, but in the event the song was withdrawn from the festival and the band parts have been lost, but a piano-accompanied version survived and was performed in the village pub.

Moeran left the cottage in 1928, but the effects of his alcoholism remained. In August 1929 he was fined £10 by the Watford magistrates for being drunk in charge of a motor vehicle; that same year he went with Heseltine and others to France, ostensibly to meet Delius. The trip degenerated into a drunken binge, during which Moeran passed out in the street. When Heseltine died in December 1930, probably by his own hand, Moeran was devastated. He wrote to Heseltine's mother: "His loss will mean a terrible gap to me when I get back to normal life and find he is no longer there".

=== Re-establishment ===
After leaving Eynsford, Moeran returned to his parents' home and began to pick up the threads of his compositional career. He had not been entirely forgotten by the musical establishment; in January 1930, the critic Hubert Foss wrote a reappraisal of Moeran's earlier works, referring to the composer's "over-long silence", but saw hope for the future: "One hopes that out of this corpus of early works a symphonic mind may grow, one that with intensity of form as well as intensity of utterance, will give us real music on a big scale".

An accident early in 1930 led to a period of convalescence which provided an opportunity for Moeran to reconsider his style. Gradually, new works were forthcoming: the Sonata for two violins (1930), the String Trio (1931), two orchestral pieces – Wythorne's Shadow (1931), and Lonely Waters (1932). A choral work, Songs of Springtime, a setting of seven Elizabethan poems, followed in 1933. Wythorne's Shadow was written possibly as a memorial for Heseltine. Several songs, including a cycle of six Suffolk folksongs, indicated the continuing importance of folk music to Moeran, and in 1931 he rejoined the committee of the Folksong Society. He also wrote some sacred music, to which he attached little value – "this tripe for the church", he called it, adding that he only did it for the money.

Moeran led an itinerant life in the 1930s, staying at his parents' various homes or with friends. However, as the decade progressed, he became more interested in his Irish roots, and began to spend large parts of the year in a cottage in Kenmare, County Kerry, where he became a well known and popular figure; Arnold Bax recorded a local comment: "If ever there was a move to elect a mayor of this town, Jack Moeran would be everybody's first choice". The peace that he found in rural Ireland inspired him to return, in 1934, to the long-abandoned symphony project. In the midst of this burgeoning creativity, Moeran continued to experience problems with alcoholism. In January 1935 he was ordered to spend nine months in a nursing home, having been found guilty in Cambridge of being drunk in charge of a motor vehicle. This interrupted but did not derail his work on the symphony, which was finally completed in 1937 and received its premiere in January 1938 in the Queen's Hall, under Leslie Heward. Heward went on to make an acclaimed recording of the Symphony with the Halle Orchestra at the end of 1942.

The years following the performance of the symphony were fruitful, and produced a number of significant works. These included the Violin Concerto (1937–41), written largely in Ireland and reflecting strong Irish influences; the madrigal suite Phyllida and Corydon (1939), possibly influenced by the music of Bernard van Dieren; the Rhapsody in F ♯ for piano and orchestra (1943), written for the pianist Harriet Cohen; the short Overture for a Masque (1944), commissioned by the Entertainments National Service Association (ENSA); and the Sinfonietta (1944), inspired in part by the hills of the Welsh border country in Radnorshire, the latest location of the family home.

=== Final years ===
Possibly as early as 1930, Moeran had met the cellist (Kathleen) Peers Coetmore. In 1943 they renewed their acquaintance, and a relationship developed, which inspired two of Moeran's important late works: the Cello Concerto (1945), and the Sonata for Cello and Piano (1947). They were married on 26 July 1945. Although the marriage brought Moeran some initial happiness and stability, Coetmore's ambitions, and the demands for her services, meant that they were often apart, and the relationship became increasingly strained. Moeran was drinking heavily, which led to further estrangement. By 1949, when Coetmore departed for an extended tour of South Africa, Australia and New Zealand, the marriage was effectively over.

Moeran produced three further late works: the Fantasy Quartet for oboe and strings (1946), written for Leon Goossens; the orchestral Serenade in G (1948), and a final song collection, Songs from County Kerry (1950). Throughout these years he struggled to complete a second symphony, and although he composed a large part of this work, he was repeatedly dissatisfied with the results. In 1949 he was under further treatment for alcoholism; the first performance of the symphony had originally scheduled for the spring of 1949 but this was put back, first until 1950 and then for a further year. In March 1950 Moeran was in Ireland, writing to Coetmore of his hopes for finishing the symphony there. He settled first in a place near Dublin, but by June he was back in Kenmare. By now his mental state was poor, and he worried that he was losing his mind. There is no record of further work on the symphony project.

On 1 December 1950, during a heavy winter storm, Moeran left his cottage and walked along the Kenmare pier, where he was seen to fall into the water. His body was retrieved; at first it was thought that he had drowned, possibly in an act of suicide, but medical evidence indicated that he had suffered a cerebral haemorrhage and had died before entering the water. After a well-attended funeral he was buried in the churchyard at Kenmare.

== Music ==
Moeran came late in the canon of last major British composers heavily influenced by folk-song and thus belongs to the lyrical tradition of such composers as Delius, Vaughan Williams and Ireland. The influence of the nature and landscapes of Norfolk and Ireland are also often evident in his music. Some of his larger-scale orchestral pieces were composed (or at least conceived) whilst Moeran walked the hills of western England, particularly in Herefordshire, and Ireland, where the grandness of the mountain ranges of Kerry inspired him greatly. Moeran was capable of conveying a wide range of emotions through his music, and he was not afraid of writing in a darker and harsher idiom when it suited him. His style is conservative but not derivative.

By Moeran's time, however, such a style was already seen as somewhat dated and he never made a big breakthrough as a composer despite the success of the sombre, Sibelian Symphony in G minor (1934–1937) that is generally regarded as his masterpiece. The Symphony stands along with the Symphony No. 1 of Sir William Walton as one of the two tightest and most controlled symphonies emanating from the British Isles of the inter-war era. The Moeran work demonstrates a robust sonata form in the first movement, along with a questioning harmonic structure, which, on first examination, may appear orthodox, but which on deeper analysis indicates the dichotomy of the interval of the fifth (which is European diatonic) with the interval of the fourth, which is both the completion of the European fifth, but also introduces the Irish dimension, in which the fourth can be the predominant interval.

Though he first received favourable critical attention for his chamber music and continued to compose significant works in this genre, his greatest achievements in general are to be found among his few large-scale orchestral works, including a Violin Concerto, Cello Concerto, Sinfonietta, and Serenade.

Moeran was very interested in "folk" music and used an extensive collection of songs that he had notated in Norfolk pubs as part of his creative material. He also made great use of Irish music. The Norfolk material can be sensed in the piano works of the early 1920s. The Irish influence is seen within the second movement of the Violin Concerto (Puck Fair at Killorglin?) and even more so in the second movement of the String Quartet in E♭, as well as in the Cello Concerto, in which fragments of Irish music, in particular "The Star of County Down" (also used by Vaughan Williams in his Five Variants of Dives and Lazarus), are evident.

Another facet to the music of Moeran is the madrigal. He once stated to a friend that if he were ever arrested and thus forced to state his profession, he would have to say it was that of being a madrigalist. Moeran was capable of staggering harmonic invention whilst working within the madrigal form – in Spring the Sweet Spring the harmonies progress from those of the madrigal into harmonies of a jazz style reminiscent of Duke Ellington; full of contradictions and added-note chords. The Serenade, an orchestral work, evinces madrigalist harmony re-worked by Moeran into an astringent style in which acerbic tonal and harmonic patterns are grafted onto the madrigalist basis to produce music of outstanding freshness and originality that surely places Moeran into the genre of inventive twentieth-century music, rather than into the "English Pastoral School", which, in itself, is arguably a misnomer.

Although he was not by any means a prolific church composer, his Services in D and E♭ are still performed today.

Recently, there has been more interest in and many recordings of Moeran's works, but some of them, such as the songs to poems by A. E. Housman and James Joyce, still remain relatively unknown.

Over 40 of his manuscripts, including that of his unfinished Second Symphony in E♭, were bequeathed by his widow Peers Coetmore to the Victorian College of the Arts, now part of the University of Melbourne.

Conductor Martin Yates has realised and completed the Symphony No. 2 from sketches. A recording of the work with Yates conducting the Royal Scottish National Orchestra was released in October 2011 on the Dutton Epoch label (together with the early Overture based on the G major Symphony, and Yates' own orchestration of Sarnia by John Ireland).

== Selected works ==
=== Symphonic ===
- In the Mountain Country, symphonic impression (1921)
- Rhapsody No. 1 in F major (1922)
- Rhapsody No. 2 in E major (1924; rev. 1941)
- Two Pieces for Small Orchestra (1931):
  - Lonely Waters
  - Whythorne's Shadow
- Farrago, suite for orchestra (1932)
- Symphony in G minor (1934–37; dedicated to Sir Hamilton Harty)
- Sinfonietta (1944; dedicated to Arthur Bliss)
- Overture for a Masque (1944; dedicated to Walter Legge)
- Serenade in G major (1948)
- Symphony No. 2 in E♭ major – unfinished; completed by conductor Martin Yates, 2011

=== Concertos ===
- Violin Concerto (1942; written for Arthur Catterall)
- Rhapsody No. 3 in F♯ major for piano and orchestra (1943)
- Cello Concerto (1945; written for Peers Coetmore)

=== Vocal ===
- Ludlow Town, song cycle (1920)
  - When smoke stood up from Ludlow
  - Farewell to barn and stack and tree
  - Say, lad, have you things to do?
  - The lads in their hundreds
- Seven Poems of James Joyce, (1929):
  - Strings in the Earth and air
  - The merry green wood
  - Bright cap
  - The pleasant valley
  - Donnycarney
  - Rain has fallen
  - Now, o now, in this brown land
- Songs of Springtime, for mixed chorus (1934)
- Nocturne, for baritone, chorus and orchestra (1934; dedicated to the memory of Frederick Delius)
- Phyllida and Corydon, for mixed chorus (1939)
- Four Shakespeare songs, (1940)
  - The lover and his lass
  - Where the bee sucks
  - When daisies pied
  - When icicles hang by the wall
- Six Poems by Seumas O'Sullivan, (1944)
  - Evening
  - The Poplars
  - A Cottager
  - The Dustman
  - Lullaby
  - The Herdsman
- Candlemas Eve by Robert Herrick, for male voice quartet (1949)

=== Chamber ===
- Piano Trio in D major (1920)
- String Quartet in A minor (1921)
- Violin Sonata in E minor (1923)
- Sonata for 2 Violins in A major (1930)
- Trio for violin, viola and cello in G major (1931)
- Prelude for cello and piano (1943, published 1944, written for Peers Coetmore)
- Fantasy Quartet, for oboe and strings (1946)
- Cello Sonata in A minor (1947; written for Peers Coetmore)
- String Quartet in E♭ (1949–50)

=== Piano ===
- Three Pieces (The Lake Island, Autumn Woods, and At a Horse Fair) (1919)
- Theme and Variations (1920)
- On a May Morning (1921)
- Stalham River (1921)
- Toccata (1921)
- Three Fancies (Windmills, Elegy, and Burlesque) (1922)
- Two Legends (Rune, and A Folk Story) (1923)
- Bank Holiday (1925)
- Summer Valley (1925)
- Two Irish Folk Songs (The White Mountain, and Irish Love Song) (1926, 1927)
- Berceuse (1933)
- Prelude in G minor (1933)

== Catalogue of works ==
Moeran did not assign opus numbers to his compositions, and the chronology of his output is complicated by revisions, reworkings, and a number of lost or fragmentary works. A chronological catalogue of Moeran's works, assigning each work an identifying "R" number intended to reflect the order of composition as far as it can be established, was devised by Andrew Rose and originally published online as the Worldwide Moeran Database (moeran.net). The catalogue's dating and ordering draw on earlier published work lists, notably Geoffrey Self, and additional research including the chronology compiled by Barry Marsh. In some cases the ordering is necessarily approximate, and works whose dates are unknown are grouped separately. The R-numbering system has since been adopted in reference sources and is used by online music libraries such as IMSLP to identify Moeran's works.

=== Complete catalogue of works (R numbers) ===
==== Unpublished works ====
- R58 (An April Evening)
- R48 (Maltworms)
- R28 (Overture), some of which was later used in the Symphony in G minor (R71).
- R64 (Farrago Suite) four movements adapted from the Serenade in G (R95).

==== Works list ====
R0. Juvenilia (MSS destroyed or lost)
- a – String Quartet, key unknown – 1911–12?
- b – String Quartet, key unknown – 1911–12?
- c – String Quartet, key unknown – 1911–12?
- d – Cello Sonata, key unknown – 1912?
R1. Dance (piano) – 1913
R2. Fields at Harvest (piano) – 1913
R3. Four songs from A Shropshire Lad (baritone & piano) – 1916
- a – Westward, On the High-Hilled Plains
- b – When I Last Came To Ludlow
- c – This Time of Year, A Twelve-Month Past
- d – Far in a Western Brookland
R4. Three Piano Pieces (piano) – 1918–19
- a – The Lake Island
- b – Autumn Woods
- c – At a Horse Fair
R5. Theme and Variations (piano) – 1920
R6. Piano Trio (piano, violin, cello) – 1920–25
R7. Twilight (vocal) – 1920
R8. Spring Goeth All in White (vocal) – 1920
R9. Ludlow Town (vocal) – 1920
- a – When Smoke Stood Up From Ludlow
- b – Farewell to Stack and Barn and Tree
- c – Say, Lad, Have You Things To Do?
- d – The Lads in their Hundreds
R10. In The Mountain Country (orchestral) – 1921
R11. String Quartet in A minor (2 violins, viola, cello) – 1921
R12. On A May Morning (piano) – 1921
R13. Toccata (piano) – 1921
R14. Stalham River (piano) – 1921
R15. Violin Sonata (violin and piano) – 1922
R16. First Rhapsody (orchestral) – 1922
R17. Three Fancies (piano) – 1922
- a – Windmills
- b – Elegy
- c – Burlesque
R18. The Day of Psalms (vocal) – 1922
R19. When June is Come (vocal) – 1922
R20. Weep You No More Sad Fountains (vocal) – 1922
R20a. Weep You No More Sad Fountains (vocal duet) – 1934
R21. Gather Ye Rosebuds (vocal) – 1922
R22. Two Legends (piano)
- a – A Folk Story
- b – Rune
R23. Six Norfolk Folk Songs (vocal) – 1923
- a – Down by the Riverside
- b – The Bold Richard
- c – Lonely Waters
- d – The Pressgang
- e – The Shooting of his Dear
- f – The Oxford Sporting Blade
R24. Two Songs (vocal) – 1923
- a – The Beanflower
- b – Impromptu in March
R25. Robin Hood Borne on his Bier (vocal) – 1923
R26. Second Rhapsody (orchestral) – 1924
R27. Lonely Waters (orchestral) – 1924/31(?)
R28. Overture (orchestral) – 1924
R29. Two Songs from the repertoire of John Goss (vocal) – 1924
- a – Can’t You Dance The Polka?
- b – Mrs Dyer the Baby Farmer
R30. The Sailor and Young Nancy (voice and piano) – 1924
R30a. The Sailor and Young Nancy (SATB) – 1948–49
R31. Gaol Song (vocal) – 1924
R32. Under the Broom (vocal) – 1924
R33. Commendation of Music (vocal) – 1924
R34. Christmas Day in the Morning (vocal) – 1924
R35. The Jolly Carter (unison chorus) – 1924
R35a. The Jolly Carter (SATB) – 1944
R36. Bank Holiday (piano) – 1925
R37. Summer Valley (piano) – 1925
R38. The Merry Month of May (vocal) – 1925
R39. Come Away, Death (vocal) – 1925
R40. A Dream of Death (vocal) – 1925
R41. In Youth is Pleasure (vocal) – 1925
R42. Troll the Bowl (vocal) – 1925
R43. 'Tis Time, I Think, By Wenlock Edge (vocal) – 1925
R44. Far in a Western Brookland (vocal) – 1925
R45. The Little Milkmaid (vocal) – 1925
R46. O Sweet Fa's The Eve (voice and piano) – 1925
R47. Irish Love Song (piano) – 1926
R48. Maltworms (vocal) – 1926
R49. Whythorne's Shadow (orchestral) – 1926–31
R50. The White Mountain (piano) – 1927
R51. Seven Poems of James Joyce (vocal) – 1929
- a – Strings in the Earth and Air
- b – The Merry Greenwood
- c – Brightcap
- d – The Pleasant Valley
- e – Donnycarney
- f – Rain has Fallen
- g – Now O Now in this Brown Land
R52. Rosefrail (vocal) – 1929
R53. Sonata for Two Violins (two violins) – 1930
R54. Songs of Springtime (vocal) – 1930
- a – Under The Greenwood Tree
- b – The River-God’s Song
- c – Spring, The Sweet Spring
- d – Love is a Sickness
- e – Sigh No More, Ladies
- f – Good Wine
- g – To Daffodils
R55. Magnificat and Nunc Dimittis (vocal) – 1930
R56. Praise the Lord, O Jerusalem (vocal) – 1930
R57. Te Deum and Jubilate (vocal) – 1930
R58. An April Evening (vocal) – 1930
R59. String Trio (violin, viola, cello) – 1931
R60. Six Suffolk Folk Songs (vocal) – 1931
- a – Nutting Time
- b – Blackberry Field
- c – Cupid’s Garden
- d – Father and Daughter
- e – The Isle of Cloy
- f – A Seaman’s Life
R61. The Sweet O' The Year (vocal) – 1931
R62. Loveliest of Trees (vocal) – 1931
R63. Blue Eyed Spring (vocal) – 1931
R64. Farrago Suite (orchestral) – 1932
R65. Alsatian Carol (vocal) – 1932
R66. Ivy and Holly (vocal) – 1932
R67. Two Pieces (piano) – 1933
- a – Prelude
- b – Berceuse
R68. The Echoing Green (vocal) – 1933
R69. Four English Lyrics (vocal) – 1934
- a – Cherry Ripe
- b – Willow Song
- c – The Constant Lover
- d – The Passionate Shepherd
R70. Nocturne (orchestral and vocal) – 1934
R71. Symphony in G minor (orchestral) – 1924–37
R72. Diaphenia (vocal) – 1937
R73. Rosaline (vocal) – 1937
R74. Blessed are Those Servants (vocal) – 1938
R75. Phyllida and Corydon (vocal) – 1939
- a – Phyllida and Corydon
- b – Beauty Sat Bathing by a Stream
- c – On a Hill There Grows a Flower
- d – Phyllis Inamorata
- e – Said I That Amaryllis
- f – The Treasure of my Heart
- g – While She Lies Sleeping
- h – Corydon, Arise
- i – To Meadows
R76. Four Shakespeare Songs (vocal) – 1940
- a – The Lover and his Lass
- b – Where the Bee Sucks
- c – When Daisies Pied
- d – Where Icicles Hang
R77. Second Rhapsody (revised version) (orchestral) – 1940–41
R78. Violin Concerto (violin and orchestra) – 1937–41
R79. Piano Rhapsody (piano and orchestra) – 1942–43
R80. Prelude (cello and piano) – 1943
R81. Fanfare for Red Army Day (orchestral, lost) – 1944
R82. Overture to a Masque (orchestral) – 1944
R83. Sinfonietta (orchestral) – 1944
R84. Invitation in Autumn (vocal) – 1944
R85. Six Poems of Seamus O’Sullivan (vocal) – 1944
- a – Evening
- b – The Poplars
- c – A Cottager
- d – The Dustman
- e – Lullaby
- f – The Herdsman
R86. The Jolly Carter (SATB) – 1944
R87. If There Be Any Gods (vocal) – 1944
R88. Irish Lament (cello and piano) – 1944
R89. Cello Concerto (cello and orchestra) – 1945
R90. Fantasy Quartet (oboe and strings) – 1946
R91. I'm Weary, Yes Mother Darling (vocal) – 1946
R92. Cello Sonata (cello and piano) – 1947
R93. Rahoon (vocal) – 1947
R94. Parson and Clerk (vocal) – 1947
R95. Serenade in G (orchestral) – 1948
- a – Prologue
- b – Intermezzo (omitted from final published score)
- c – Air
- d – Galop
- e – Minuet
- f – Forlana (omitted from final published score)
- g – Rigadoon
- h – Epilogue
R96. Candlemas Eve (vocal) – 1949
R97. Songs from County Kerry (vocal) – 1950
- a – The Dawning of the Day
- b – My Love Passed Me By
- c – The Murder of Father Hanratty
- d – The Roving Dingle Boy
- e – The Lost Lover
- f – The Tinker’s Daughter
- g – Kitty, I am in love with you
R98. String Quartet No. 2 in E♭ (2 violins, viola, cello) – unknown
R99. Second Symphony (orchestral, unfinished) – first sketches 1939
R100. O Fair Enough are Sky and Plain (vocal) – ? (published 1957)
R101. O Sweet Fa's The Eve (SATB) – ? (published 1925)
R102. Sheepshearing (vocal) – ? (published 1927)
R103. The Lover and his Lass (vocal) – ? (published 1934)
R104. Rores Montium (vocal) – ?
R105. Tilly (vocal) – ? (published 1933)
R106. Green Fire (vocal) – ? (published 1933)
R107. To Blossoms (vocal) – ? (published 1934)
R108. High Germany (vocal) – ? (folksong collected in 1921)
R109. The Monk's Fancy (vocal) – ? (words H. J. Pope; MS Britten–Pears Library)
R110. One Morning in Spring (vocal) – ? (Norfolk folksong; Britten–Pears Library)
R111. Mantle of Blue (vocal) – ? (words Padraic Colum)

== Sources ==
- Bax, Arnold (April 1951). "E.J. Moeran 1894–1950". Music & Letters. 32 (2): 125–127. doi:10.1093/ml/XXXII.2.125. JSTOR 729341. (subscription required)
- Cockshott, Gerald (March 1955). "E. J. Moeran's Recollections of Peter Warlock". The Musical Times. 96 (1345): 128–130. doi:10.2307/937140. JSTOR 937140. (subscription required)
- Foss, Hubert (January 1930). "E.J. Moeran: A Critical Appreciation". The Musical Times. 71 (1043): 26–29. doi:10.2307/915109. JSTOR 915109. (subscription required)
- Foss, Hubert (January 1951). "Ernest John Moeran (1894–1950)". The Musical Times. 92 (1295): 20–22. JSTOR 935285. (subscription required)
- Heffer, Simon (8 July 2009). "Proms 2009: EJ Moeran's Symphony in G Minor". The Daily Telegraph.
- Hold, Trevor (2005). Parry to Finzi: Twenty English Song-composers. Woodbridge, Suffolk: Boydell Press. ISBN 0-85115-887-0.
- Johnson, Stephen (2014). "Ernest John Moeran". BBC Music.
- McNeill, Rhoderick (December 1980). "Moeran's Unfinished Symphony". The Musical Times. 121 (1654): 771–777. doi:10.2307/962517. JSTOR 962517. (subscription required)
- Maxwell, Ian (2014). The Importance of Being Ernest John: Challenging the Misconceptions about the Life and Works of E. J. Moeran (PDF) (PhD thesis). Durham University.
- Maxwell, Ian (2015). "Moeran, E(rnest) J(ohn) S(meed)". Grove Music Online. Oxford University Press. doi:10.1093/gmo/9781561592630.article.48243. ISBN 978-1-56159-263-0. (subscription required)
- Maxwell, Ian (2021). Ernest John Moeran: His Life and Music. Woodbridge, Suffolk: Boydell & Brewer. ISBN 978-1-7832-7601-1.
- Rayborn, Tim (2016). A New English Music: Composers and Folk Traditions in England's Musical Renaissance from the Late 19th to the Mid-20th Century. Jefferson, NC: McFarland & Co. ISBN 978-0-7864-9634-1.
- Self, Geoffrey (1986). The Music of E. J. Moeran. London: Toccata Press. ISBN 0907689175.
- Self, Geoffrey (2004). "Moeran, Ernest John Smeed". Oxford Dictionary of National Biography (online ed.). Oxford University Press. doi:10.1093/ref:odnb/35052. (Subscription, Wikipedia Library access or UK public library membership required.) (subscription required)
- Smith, Barry (2015). "Heseltine, Philip Arnold [pseud. Peter Warlock]". Oxford Dictionary of National Biography (online ed.). Oxford University Press. doi:10.1093/ref:odnb/33843. (Subscription, Wikipedia Library access or UK public library membership required.) (subscription required)
- Warlock, Peter (1924). "E.J. Moeran". The Music Bulletin via The Worldwide Moeran Database. Archived from the original on 12 September 2015.
- Weedon, Robert (2014). "E.J. Moeran's War". War Composers.
- Wild, Stephen (1974). E.J. Moeran. Rickmansworth: Triad Press.
- "Category:Moeran, Ernest John". IMSLP.
- "The Worldwide Moeran Database (archived)". The Worldwide Moeran Database. Archived from the original on 17 December 2014. by Andrew Rose, including a more detailed biography and a complete list of works.
