= Kenny Napper =

English jazz double-bassist (born 1933)

Kenneth Napper (born 14 July 1933) is an English jazz double-bassist.

== Biography ==
Napper was born in London on 14 July 1933. He started out on piano as a child and picked up bass as a student at Guildhall School of Music. He entered the British military in the early 1950s, playing with Mary Lou Williams in 1953 during a leave period. After ending his term of duty, he played with Jack Parnell, Malcolm Mitchell, Vic Ash, and Cab Calloway. He was the house bassist at Ronnie Scott's Jazz Club for several years and played with many British and American jazz musicians in the late 1950s and early 1960s, including Alan Clare, Ronnie Scott, Stan Tracey, Tubby Hayes, Tony Kinsey, Tony Crombie, Jimmy Deuchar, John Dankworth, Pat Smythe, Phil Seamen, Zoot Sims, Carmen McRae, and Paul Gonsalves. Later in the 1960s he worked with Ted Heath, Tony Coe, John Picard, and Barney Kessel, as well as with Gonsalves, Tracey, and Dankworth. In 1970 he played with Stephane Grappelli and moved to Germany, playing with Kurt Edelhagen from 1970 to 1972. While in Germany he focused more on composition and arrangement; later in the decade he moved to the Netherlands, where he arranged for radio ensembles.

== Sources ==
- "Kenny Napper". The New Grove Dictionary of Jazz. 2nd edition, ed. Barry Kernfeld.
