= Charles Acton (critic) =

Music critic

- Born: Charles Ball-Acton; 25 April 1914; Iron Acton, South Gloucestershire, England
- Died: 22 April 1999 (aged 84); Carrickmines, County Dublin, Ireland
- Education: Rugby School, Trinity College, Cambridge
- Occupation: Music critic
- Years active: 1955–1989
- Spouse: Carol Little

Charles Acton (25 April 1914 – 22 April 1999) was the music critic at The Irish Times for thirty-one years until his retirement in 1987. He was one of only two critics based outside Great Britain to be a member of The Critics' Circle.

== Early life ==
He was born Charles Ball-Acton in the village of Iron Acton, in what is now South Gloucestershire in England. His family was of Anglo-Irish Protestant stock, having been landowners in County Wicklow since the reign of King Charles I. His branch of the family included among its more notable members, the historian, Lord Acton. Charles Acton's father, Major Reginald Thomas Annesley Ball-Acton, was killed at Ypres in Belgium during World War I when Charles was only two. His mother, Isabel (née Richmond), remarried and lived until 1971. Acton was educated at Rugby School and later studied natural sciences at Trinity College, Cambridge, although he left in 1936 without taking his degree.

In 1939, Acton came to Ireland, having inherited the family estate at Kilmacurragh, County Wicklow. Having tried unsuccessfully to run it as a country house hotel, he eventually sold the property, and it is now part of the National Botanic Gardens. Meanwhile, Acton undertook a series of diverse jobs for which he was ill-suited, including that of travelling salesman for Encyclopædia Britannica. Eventually, in 1955, he found his niche when he was appointed music critic at The Irish Times.

== Career ==
Although never formally trained in music, Acton had a keen interest in the subject from an early age. As a child he played piano, bassoon and clarinet. He listened to concerts on BBC Radio and, in his early twenties, he visited Munich where he saw Richard Strauss and Hans Knappertsbusch conduct. At Rugby, he became friends with the Irish composer Brian Boydell (1917–2000).

Over the course of his career as Irish Times music critic, Acton reviewed over 6,000 concerts. He could be quite scathing in his observations, and some musicians were so upset by his criticism that they refused to perform if he was present. Yet, he was also in love with music and could be greatly moved by a particularly sensitive performance. Columnist Kevin Myers described him at the end of a concert "mop[ping] the tears from his large round cheeks with an even larger white handkerchief".

Throughout his time as music critic, Acton campaigned for better resources for classical music in Ireland. He was a leading light in the Music Association of Ireland during its early years. As a result of his lobbying of Radio Éireann, Cork became the home of the first resident string quartet of any broadcasting station in the world. For over twenty years he argued for investment in a national concert hall, highlighting Ireland's unique status as the only European nation without such a facility. In September 1981, his efforts met with success when the inaugural concert at Dublin's new National Concert Hall took place. Acton was present to mark the historic event and to review the performances.

Although he retired officially as music critic at The Irish Times in 1987, Acton continued as an occasional concert reviewer for a further two years alongside his successor, Michael Dervan.

For many years, Acton also wrote articles on musical life in Ireland for Éire-Ireland, the quarterly journal of the Irish American Cultural Institute.

== Honours ==
In 1970, Acton was invited to join The Critics' Circle and was, apart from Clive Barnes, the only member based outside Britain.

Acton was awarded the first Sean O'Boyle Award in 1980 for his services to Irish traditional music.

In 1990, he was elected a fellow of the Royal Irish Academy of Music and, eight years later, was elected vice-president.

== Personal life ==
In 1951, Acton married Carol Little, a violin teacher. They lived together in Carrickmines, County Dublin, until his death at the age of eighty four. He is buried in the family graveyard in Dunganstown, County Wicklow.

== Bibliography ==
- Gareth Cox (ed.): Acton's Music. Reviews 1955–1985 (Bray, County Wicklow: Kilbride Books, 1996), ISBN 0-948018-32-1.
- Richard Pine: Charles. The Life and World of Charles Acton (Dublin: Lilliput Press, 2010), ISBN 978-1-84351-165-6.
- Charles Gannon: John S. Beckett – The Man and the Music (Dublin: Lilliput Press, 2016).
