= Xuân Phượng =

Vietnamese television director (born 1929)

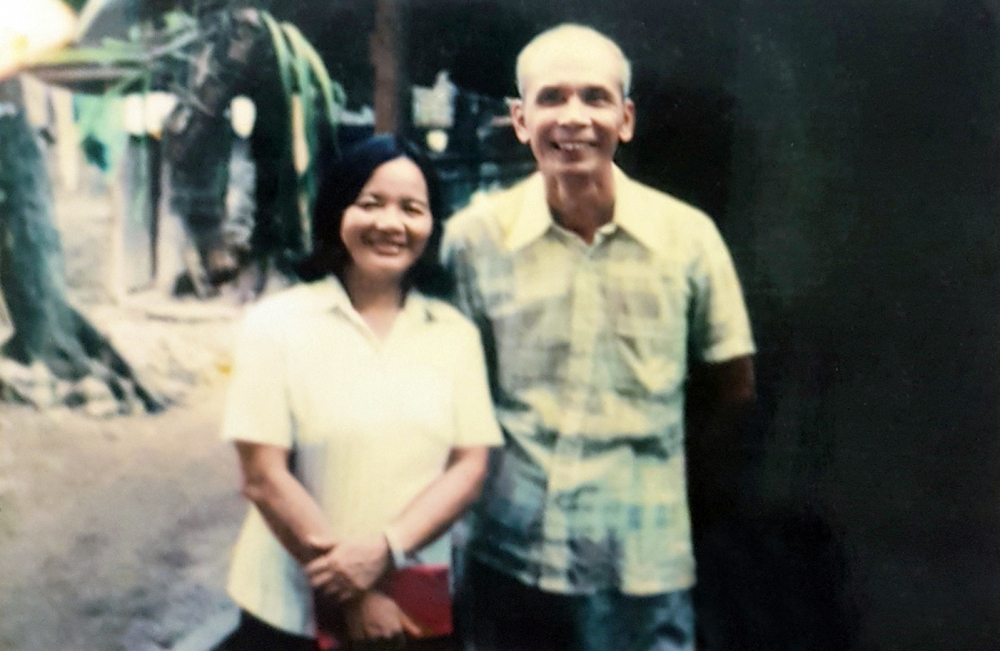
- Xuân Phượng and her husband Tôn Thất Hoàng
- Born: Nguyễn Thị Xuân Phượng; 1929 (age 96–97); Huế, French Indochina
- Occupations: nationalist fighter, war correspondent, art gallery owner
- Spouse: Tôn Thất Hoàng

Xuân Phượng (born 1929) is a Vietnamese TV director. She made explosives for the Viet Minh and entered Saigon with the victors as the rest of her family left with the defeated Americans. She was a doctor, a war correspondent, a writer and she founded an art gallery. She was named one of the BBC 100 Women for 2024.

== Life ==
Xuân Phượng was born in Huế in 1929 in a privileged family. She grew up in Đà Lạt in the Central Highlands of Vietnam, where her father was an inspector of education. Her mother did not use European dress but many of her father's friends were French and the family experienced French culture and music. Her parents drove a French Citroen car and she, like her siblings, had her own nanny.

When she was sixteen, she joined a resistance group to fight against French colonial rule of Vietnam. She was against "the colonialists". She made explosives and she went on to be a doctor and a war correspendent.

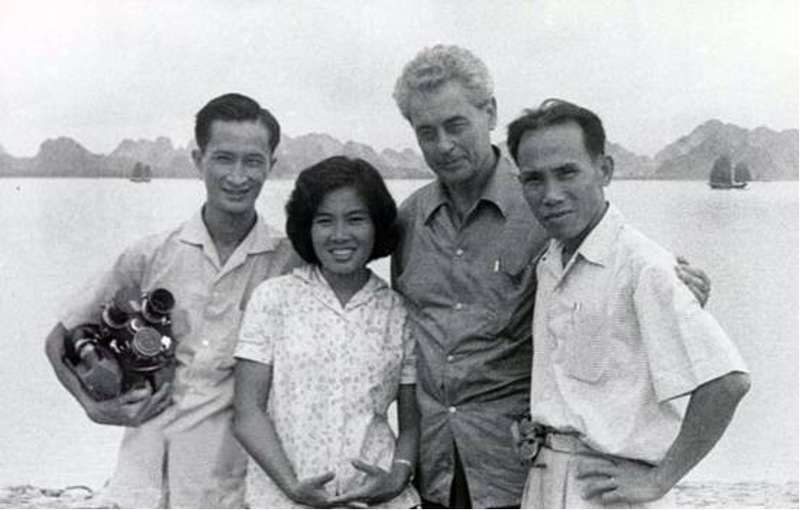
Xuân Phượng, Joris Ivens and the filming crew of "17th Parallel Vietnam in War".

In 1968 she was assigned as the interpreter and host to Marceline Loridan and Joris Ivens who had arrived to direct the film 17th Parallel: Vietnam in War about the effect of bombing on Vietnam. Phượng said that she remembered a comment by Joris Ivens where he hoped that she would make a good life. This led her to turn away from her career path which was heading to be a deputy minister. She decided instead to become a war correspondent.

She was present as a member of the Vietcong at the Fall of Saigon in 1975, and as the city came under the control of the North Vietnamese, her family left for the United States on one of the final escapes from the city. She would not see them again for another 25 years. She later visited them in California and witnessed the new life they had found.

When she was 62, she founded the first private art gallery in Ho Chi Minh City. The Lotus gallery specialised in the work of Vietnamese artists. Her husband was not very supportive of her gallery, but he came around after she discovered works by Trương Đình Hào which transformed the artist's life as they sold for tens of thousands of dollars each.

Xuân Phượng published her writing, "Ao Dai: My War, My Country, My Vietnam". She describes herself as someone who has had two lives.

In 2024, she was in her nineties when she was named one of the BBC's 100 influential women. When she was first approached by the BBC she was advised that is may be a scam, however she said that she didn't worry about it. She was pleased to see that she was included with a disabled writer and Sharon Stone because she admired their work.
