= Lifebuoy =

Buoy designed to be thrown to person in water, to prevent drowning

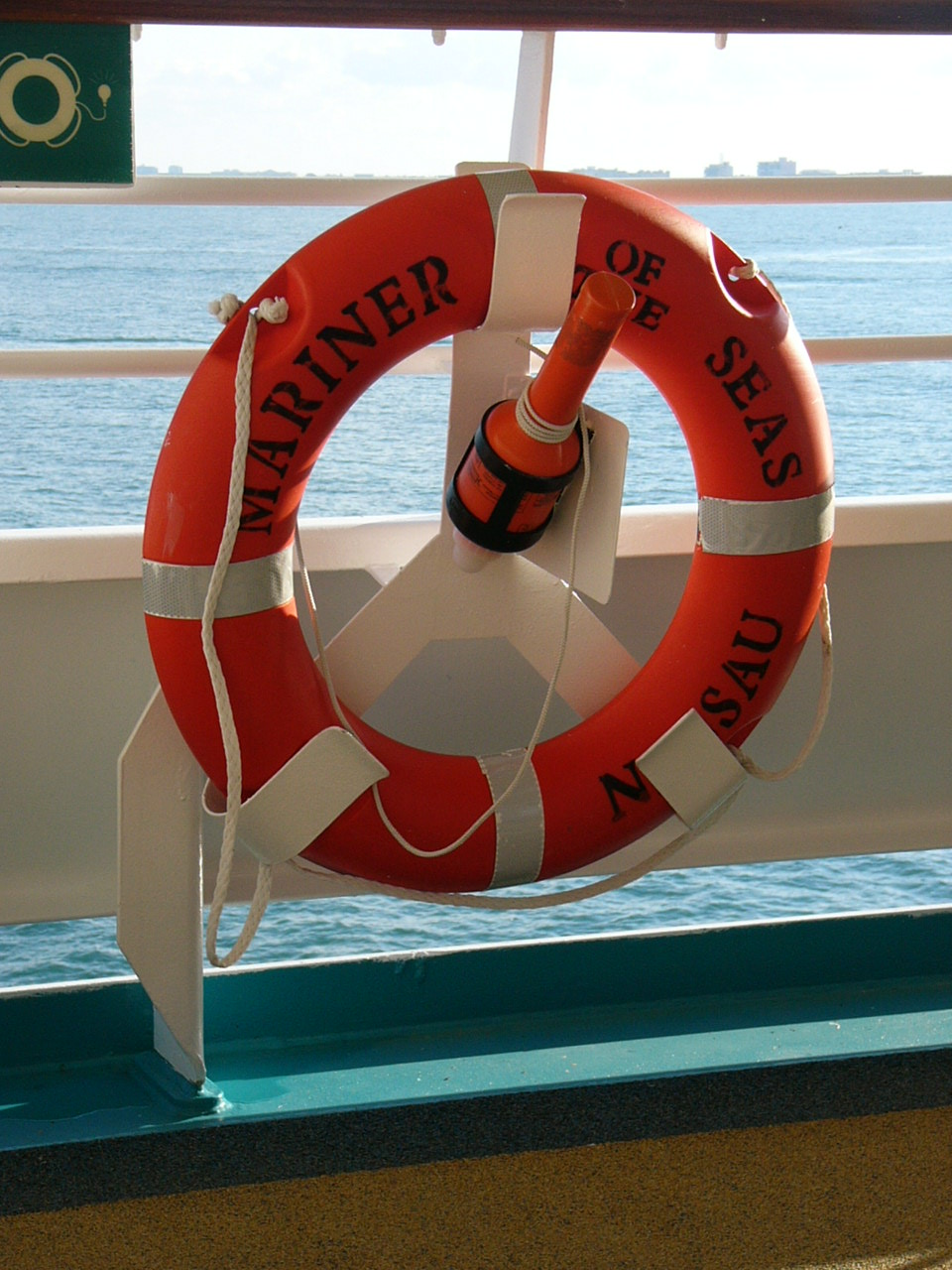
Lifebuoy with emergency light on a cruise ship

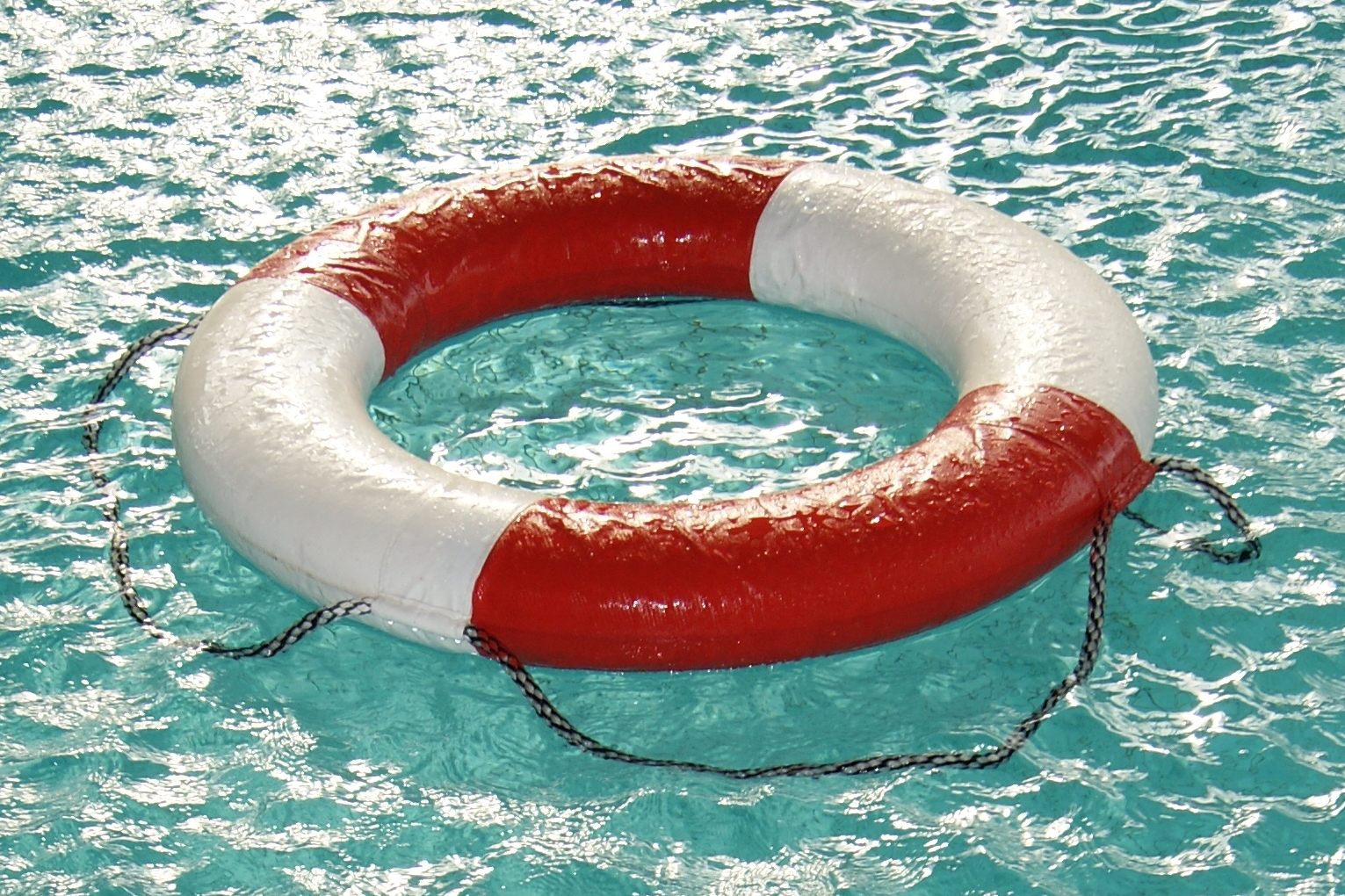
A lifebuoy floating on water

A lifebuoy, life preserver, life ring, or lifesaver among many other names, is a life-saving buoy designed to be thrown to a person in water to provide buoyancy and prevent drowning. Some modern lifebuoys are fitted with one or more seawater-activated lights to aid rescue at night.

== Other names ==
Other names for "lifebuoy" include:

- life-preserver
- life ring
- life-ring
- life-belt
- life-saver
- ring-buoy
- donut
- safety wheel
- Perry buoy
- Kisbee ring

== Description ==
The lifebuoy is usually a ring- or horseshoe-shaped personal flotation device with a connecting line allowing the casualty to be pulled to the rescuer in a boat. They are carried by ships and boats and located beside bodies of water and swimming pools.

In the United States, Coast Guard approved lifebuoys are considered Type IV personal flotation devices. At least one Type IV PFD is required on all vessels 26 feet or more in length.

In the UK the Royal Life Saving Society considers lifebuoys unsuitable for use in swimming pools because throwing one into a busy pool could injure the casualty or other pool users. In these locations, lifebuoys have been superseded by devices such as the torpedo buoy, a low-drag device developed to be towed by lifeguards to those in danger.

== History ==
Leonardo da Vinci sketched a concept for a safety wheel, as well as for buoyant shoes and balancing sticks for walking on water.

According to various sources the Knights of Malta were the first to use cork lifebuoys on their ships.

In the book Architectura naval antigua y moderna (1752) by Juan José Navarro, 1st Marquess of Victoria, two plates show "circular lifebuoys" and another plate includes a drawing of "a lifebuoy made of cork", called "salvenos". This is the type used systematically by the Knights of Malta on their ships. The lifebuoy was attached to a rope on one side and to the poop of the ship on the other, so that it may be deployed in case anyone should fall into the sea. Navarro was Captain General of the Navy and is credited with the systematic introduction of the lifebuoy on all ships of the Spanish navy.

In 1803, a device called the "Marine Spencer" from the name of its inventor, Knight Spencer of Bread Street, was described in the Philosophical Magazine. It was made of "800 old tavern corks" affixed to a band, "covered in canvass, and painted in oil, so as to render it waterproof." The invention gained Spencer the honorary silver medal from the Royal Humane Society.

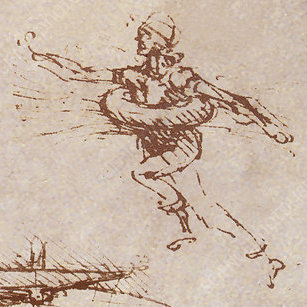
Leonardo da Vinci's design sketches for a safety wheel

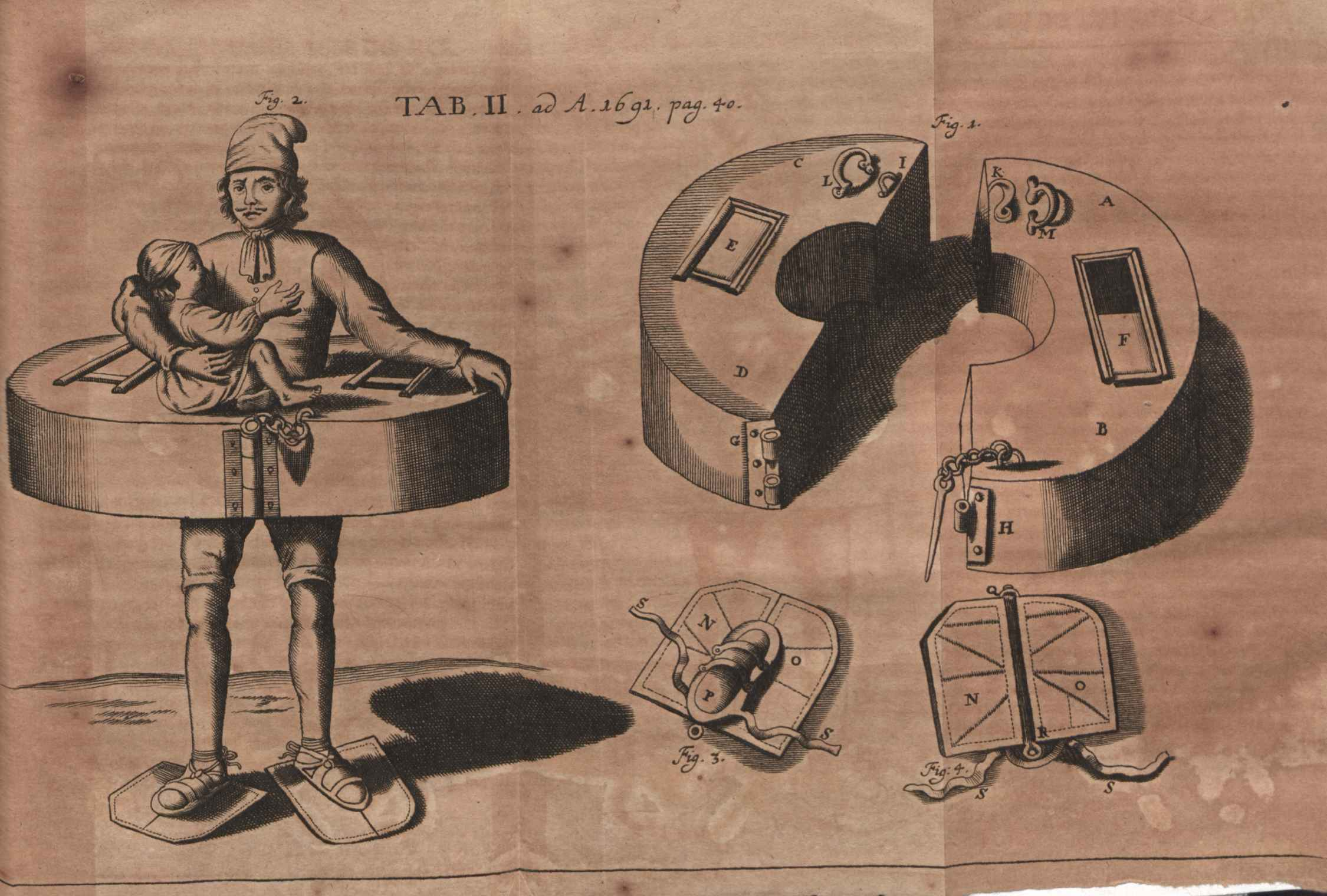
First studies on the lifebuoy illustrated in the Acta Eruditorum, 1691

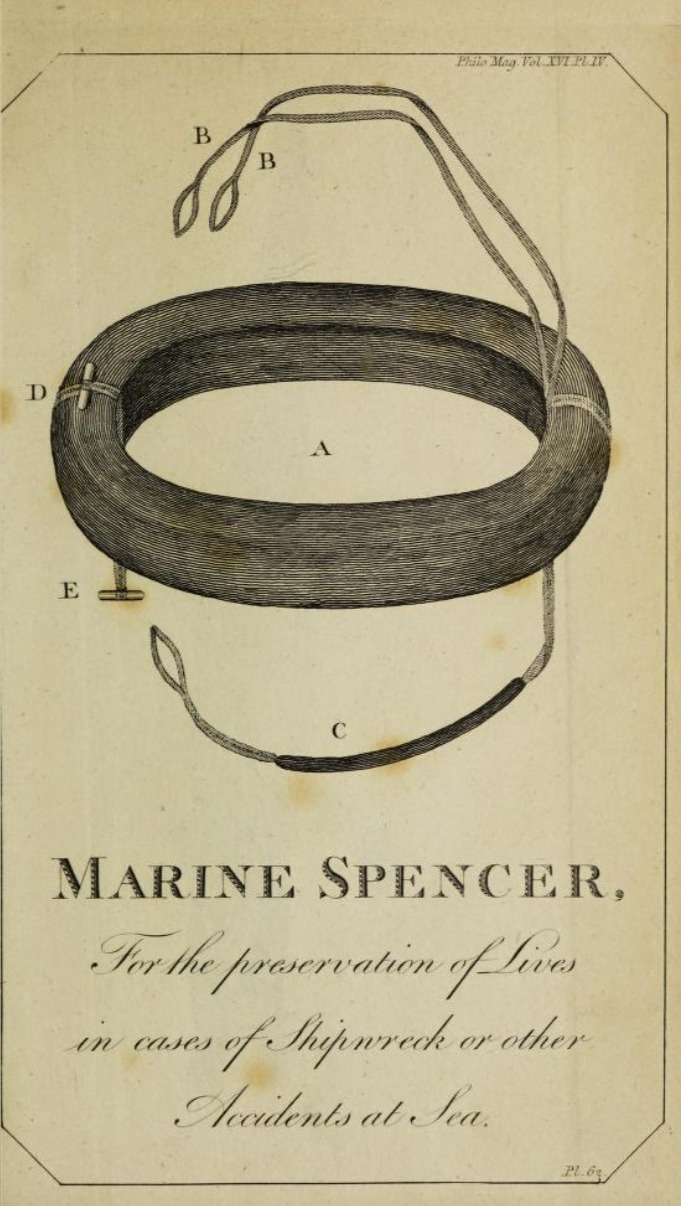
Illustration of the prototype of the "Marine Spencer", an early example of lifebuoy, from the Philosophical Magazine, 1803

== Gallery ==
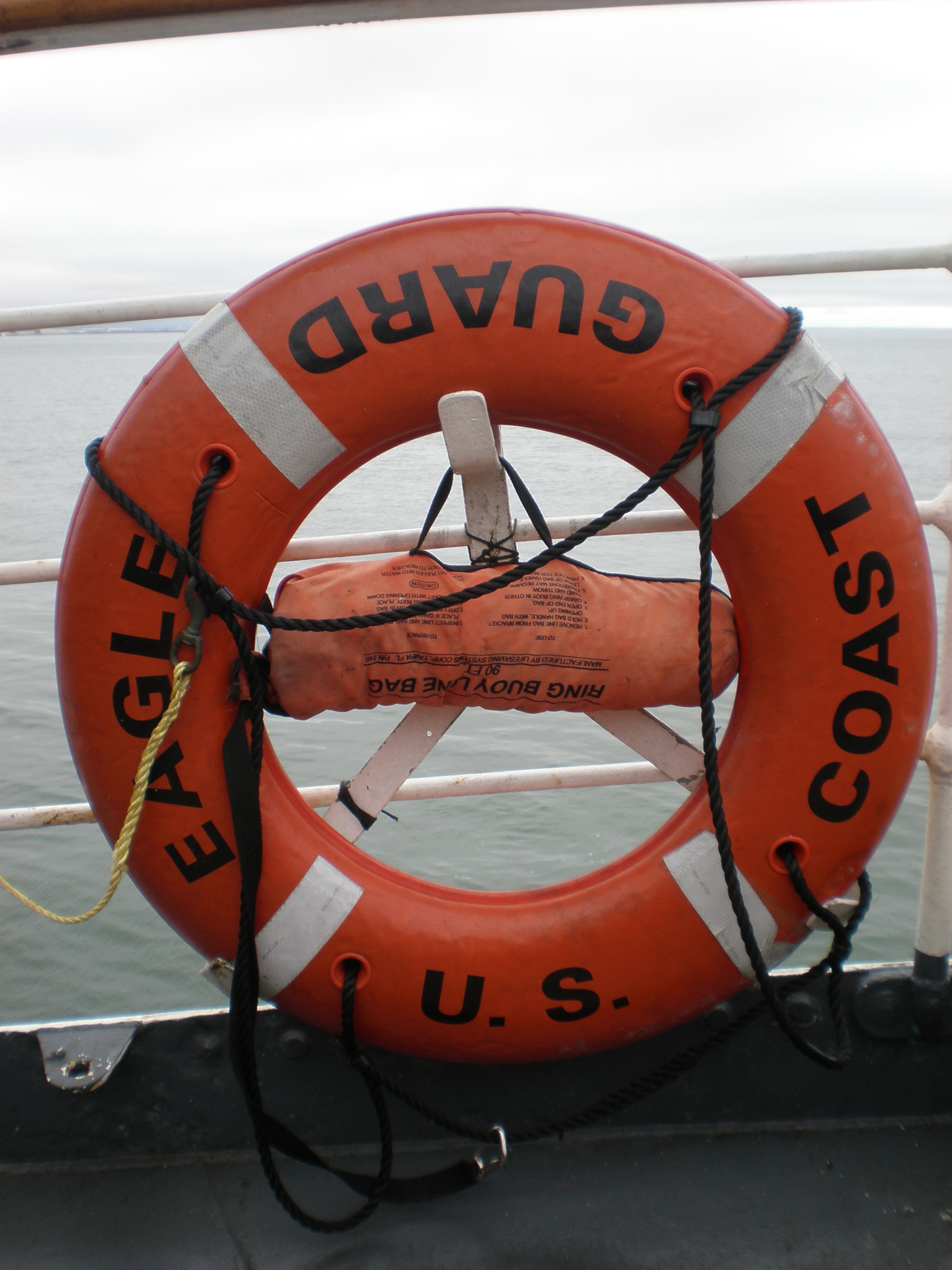
Commercial use lifebuoy aboard USCGC Eagle

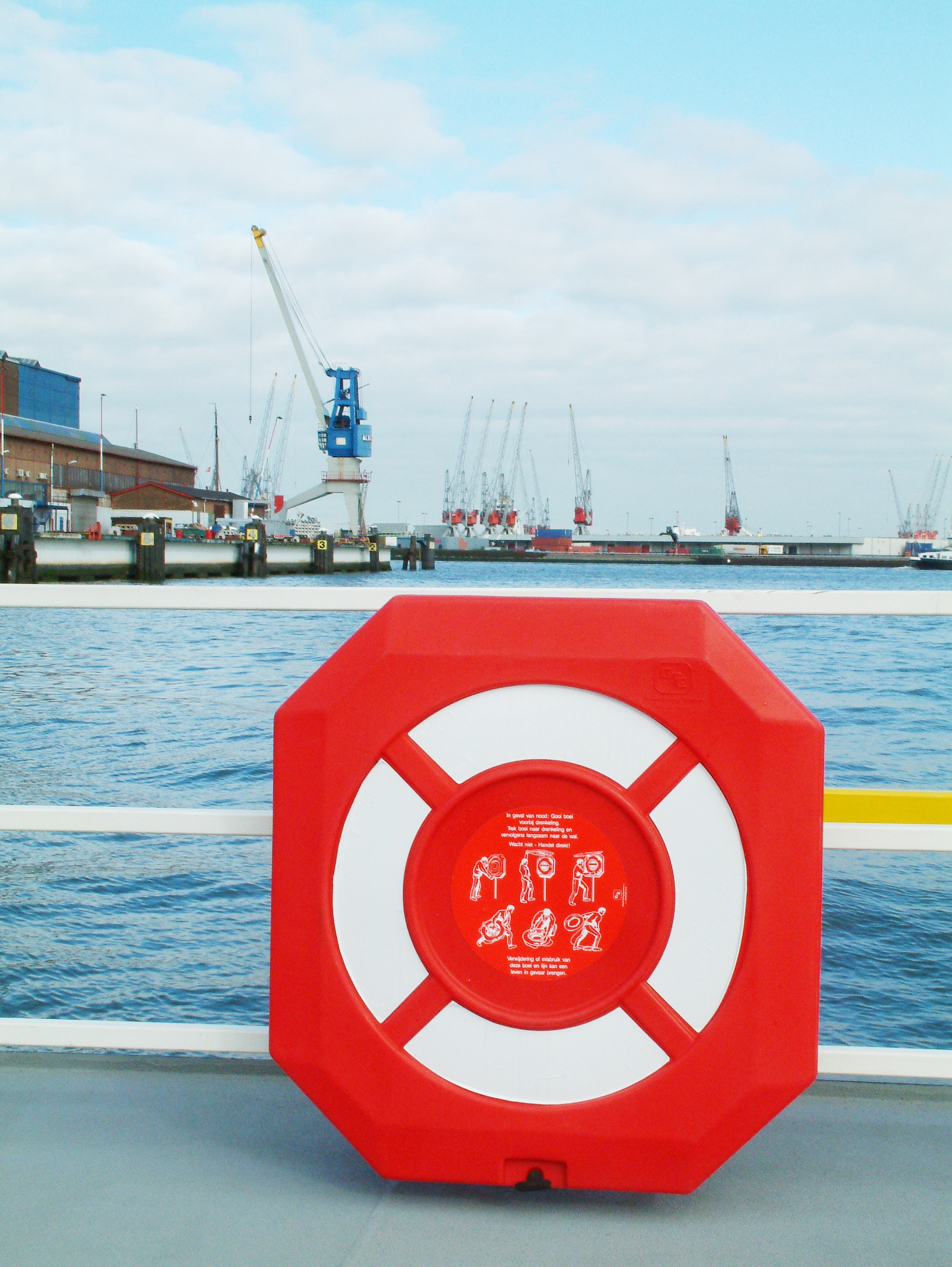
Containered lifebuoy with concealed rope

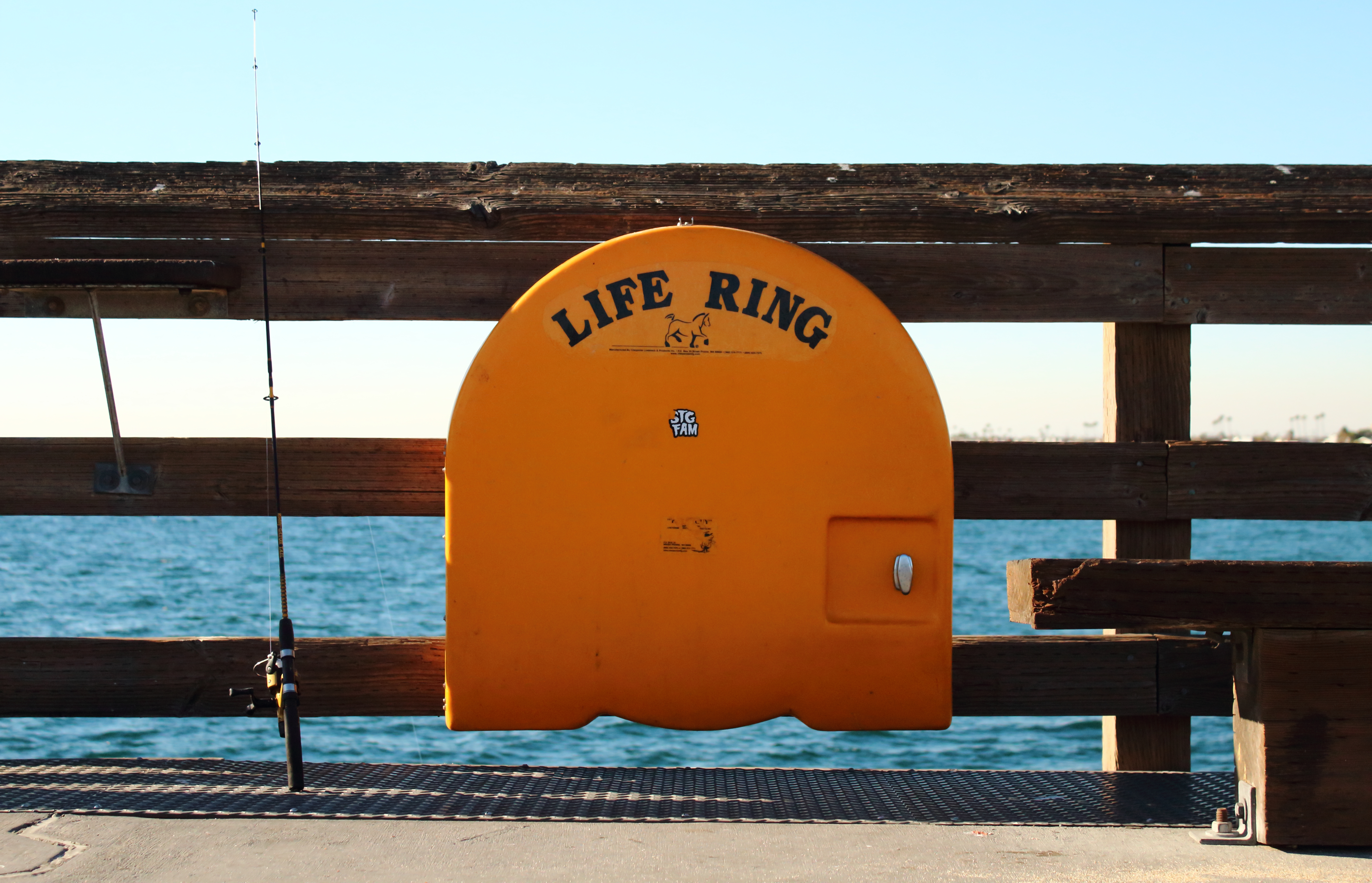
Containered lifebuoy in Newport Beach, California

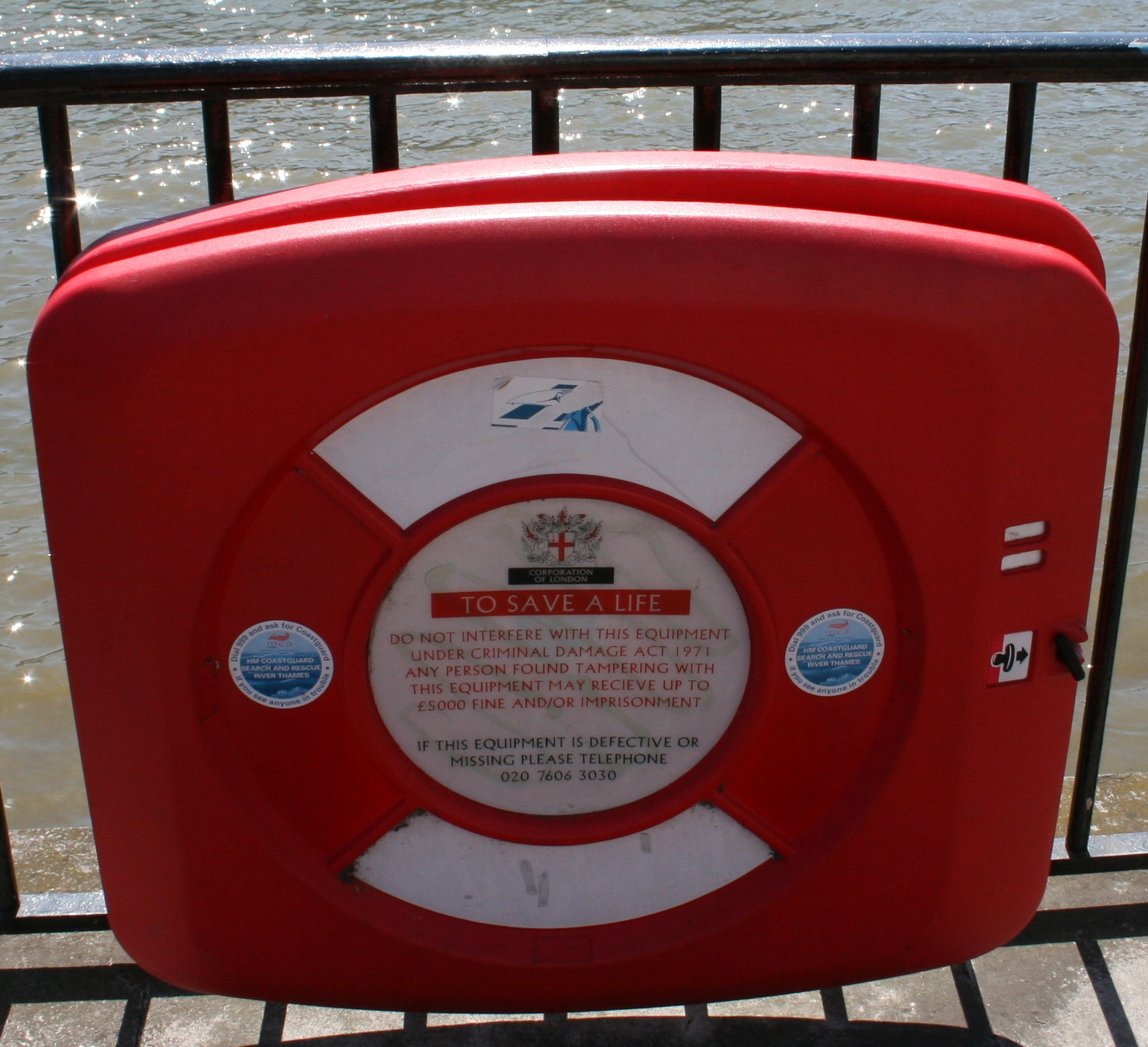
Containered lifebuoy by the River Thames

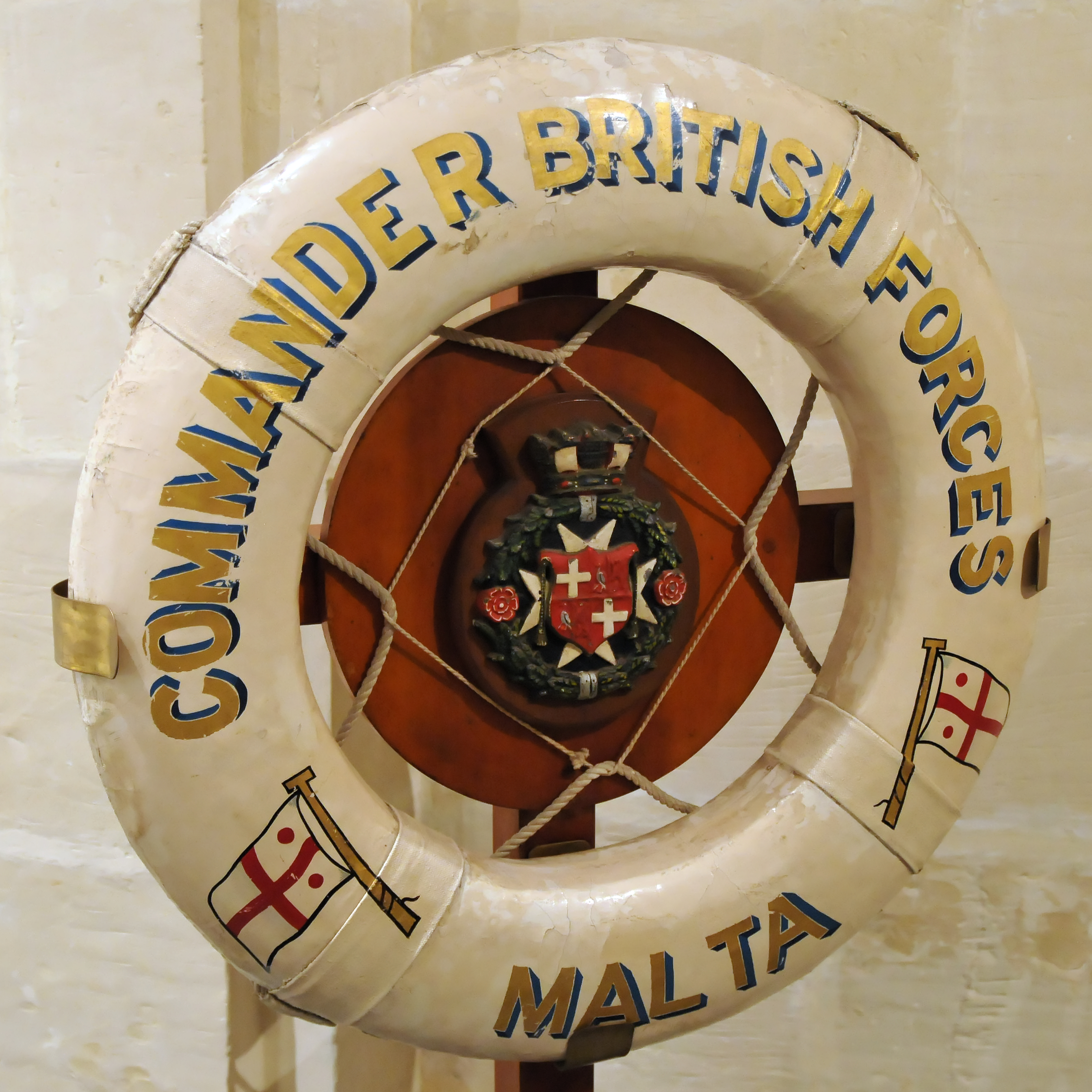
Older style of lifebuoy

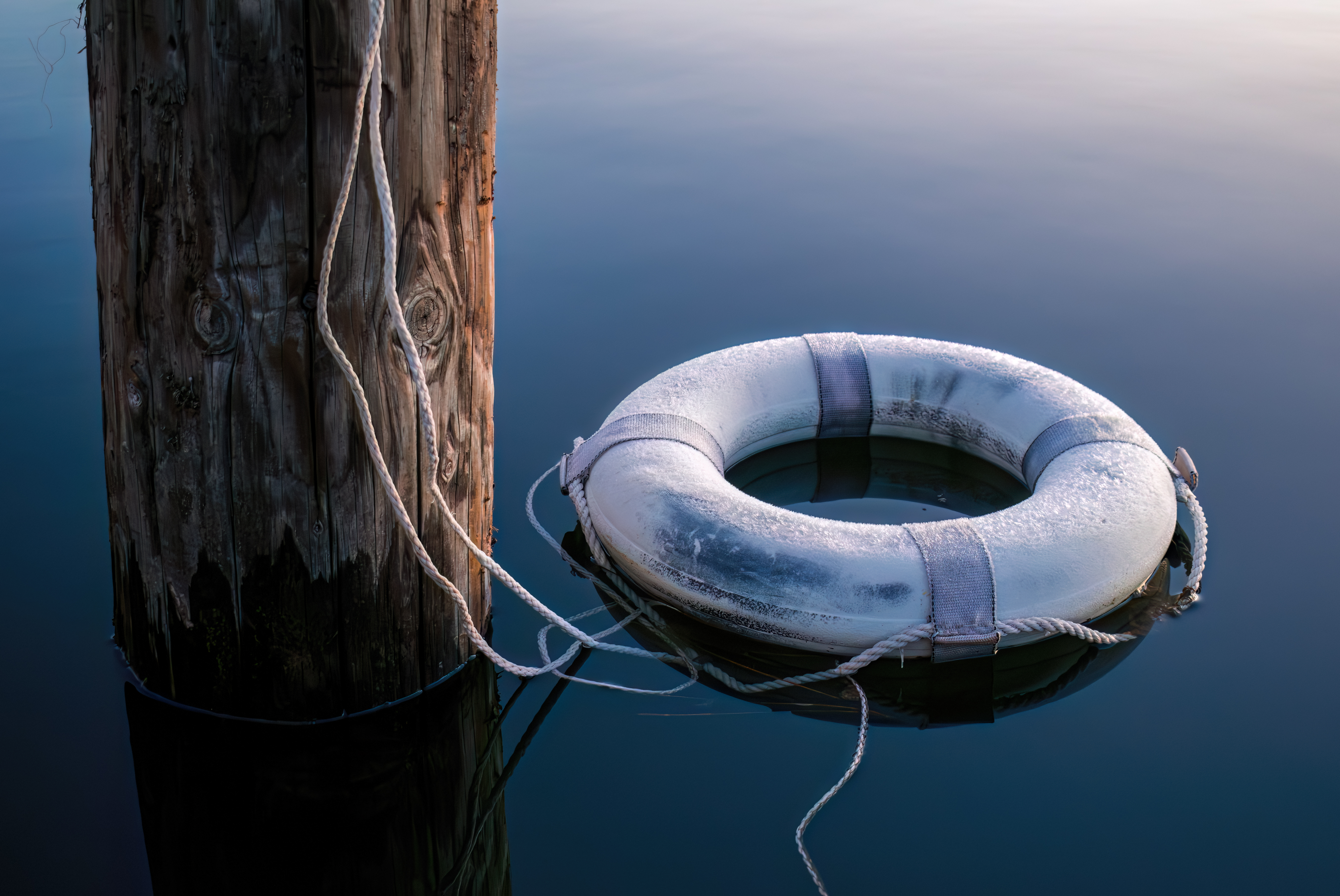
Frost-covered lifebuoy, Lake Siskiyou, California

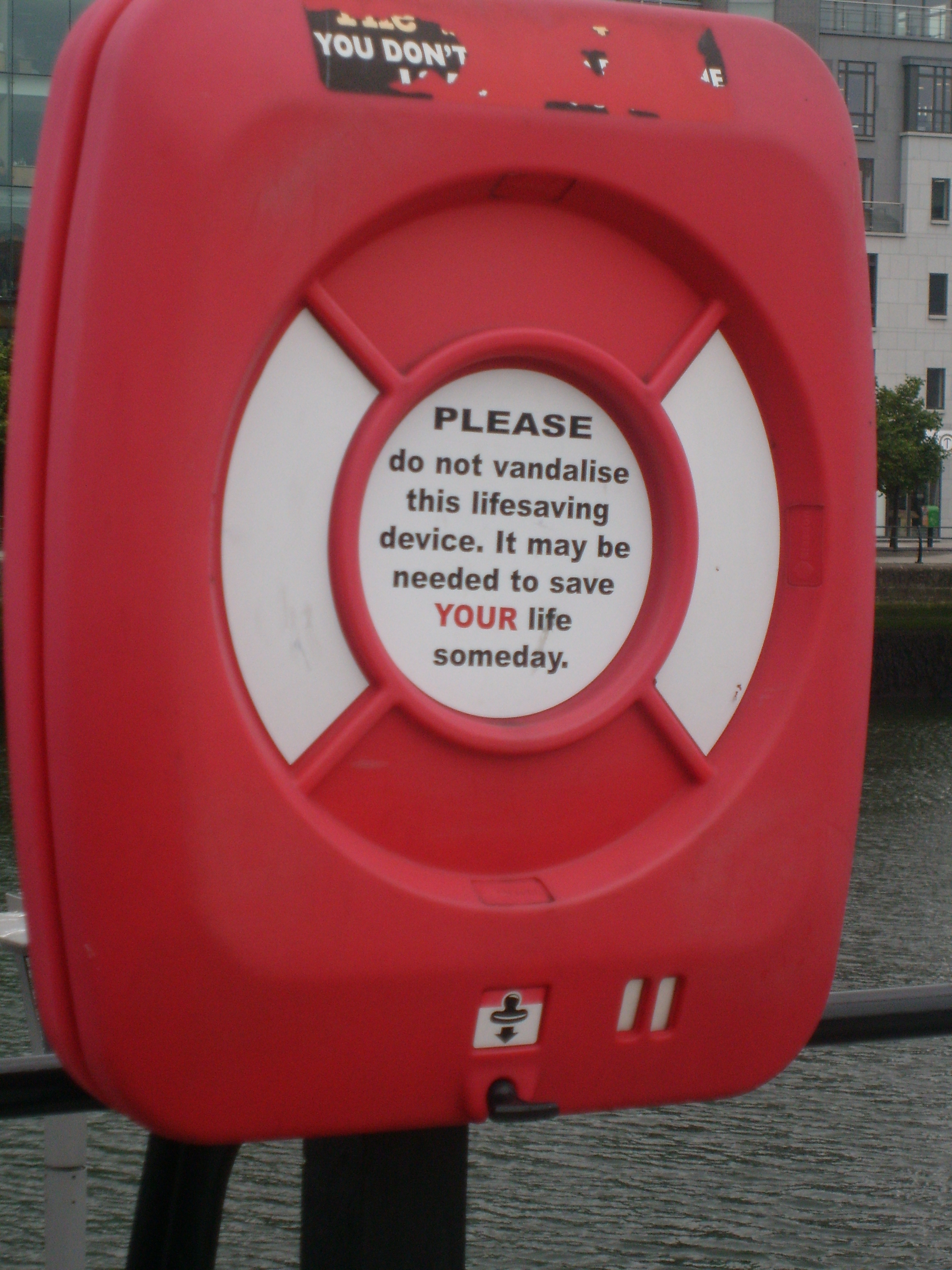
Lifebuoy in Ireland

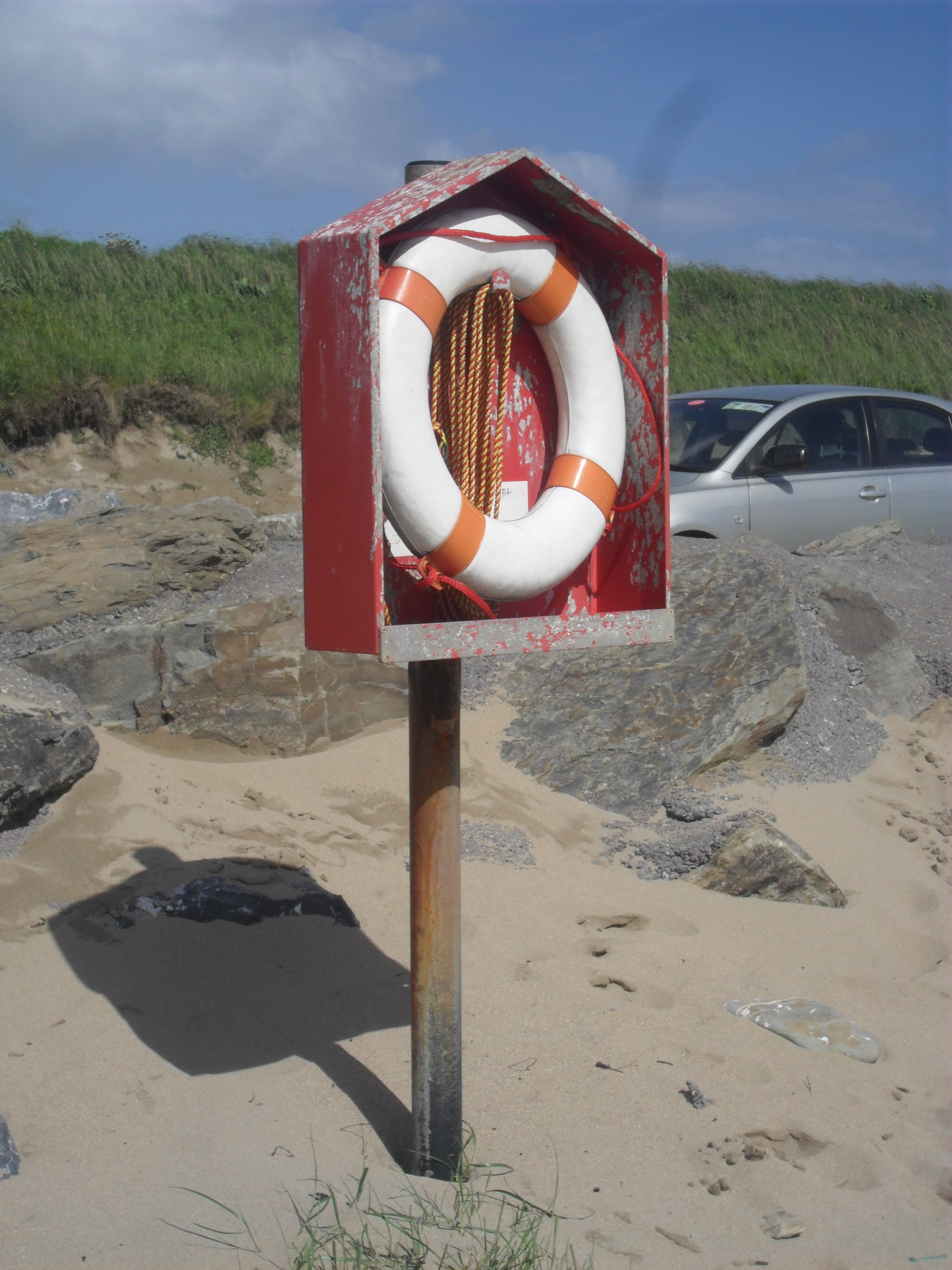
Lifebuoy on a beach

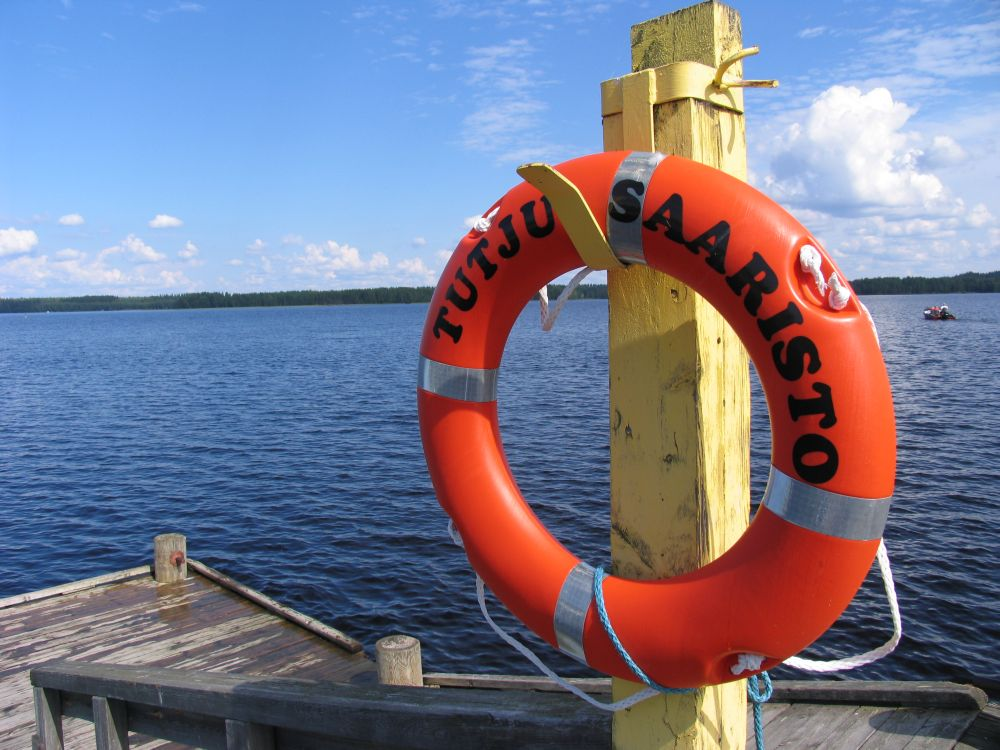
Lifebuoy at Tutjuniemi of Saaristo Harbour in Liperi, North Karelia, Finland

== See also ==
- Personal flotation device – Equipment to help the wearer keep afloat in water
- Pool float, also known as swimming float – Device used to keep someone above water
- Swim ring – Inflatable water toy
