= Rescue buoy =

Torpedo-shaped lifesaver

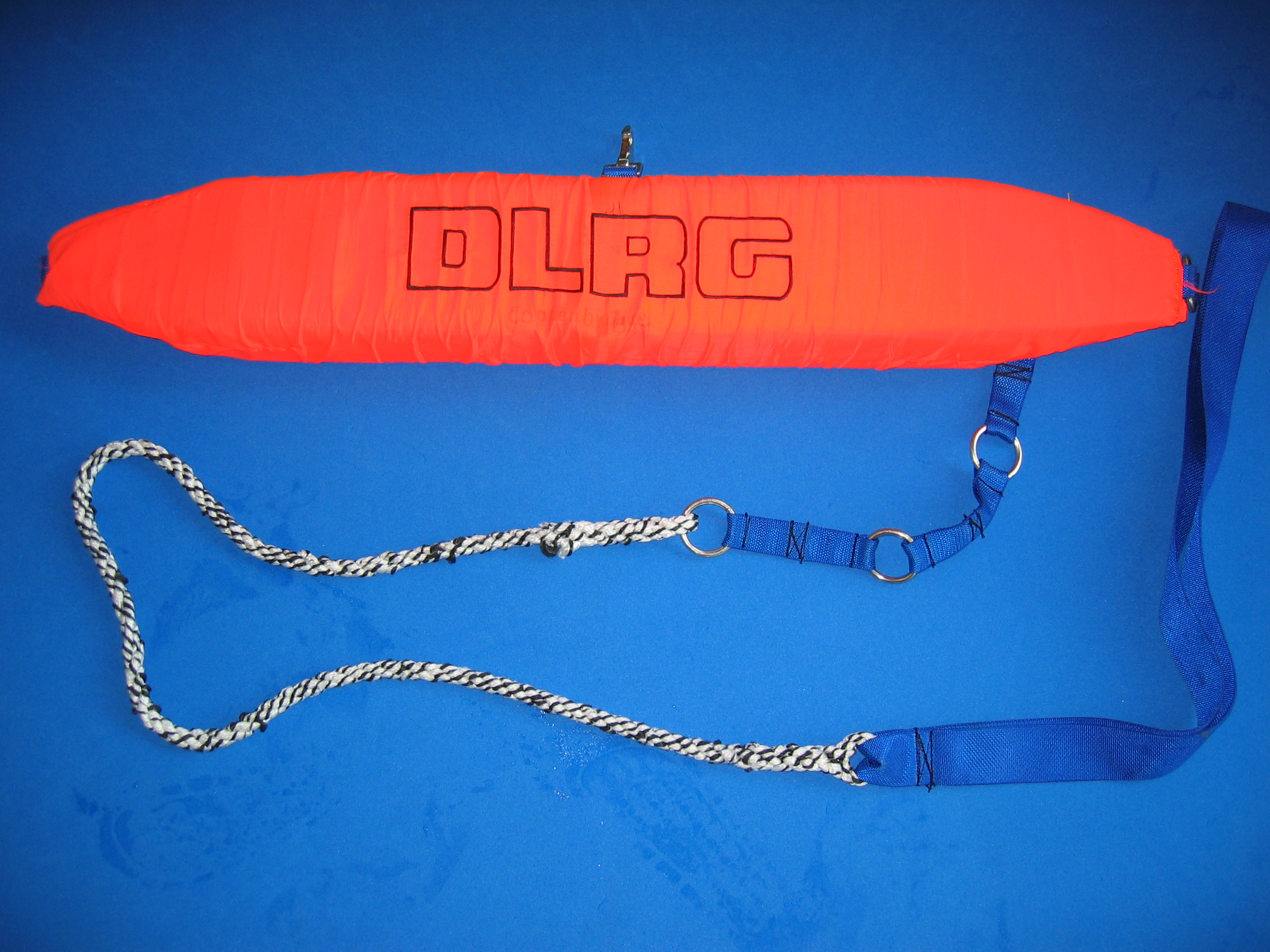
A rescue tube, or Peterson tube.

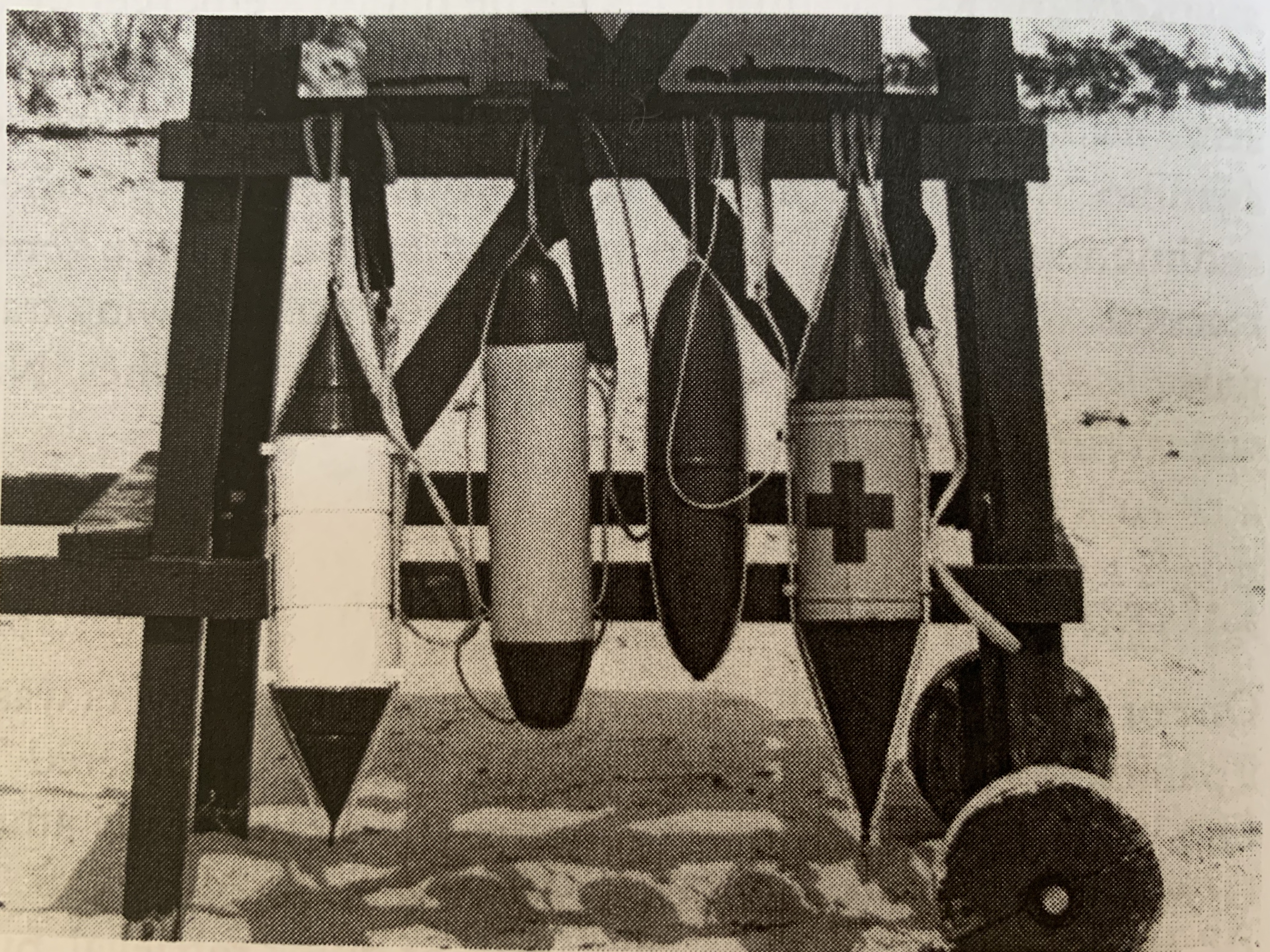
Original rescue buoys, also called can buoys.

A rescue buoy or rescue tube or torpedo buoy is a piece of lifesaving equipment used in water rescue. This flotation device can help support the victim's and rescuer's weight to make a rescue easier and safer for the rescuer. It is an essential part of the equipment that must be carried by lifeguards. It further can act as a mark of identification, identifying an individual as a lifeguard.

== Description ==
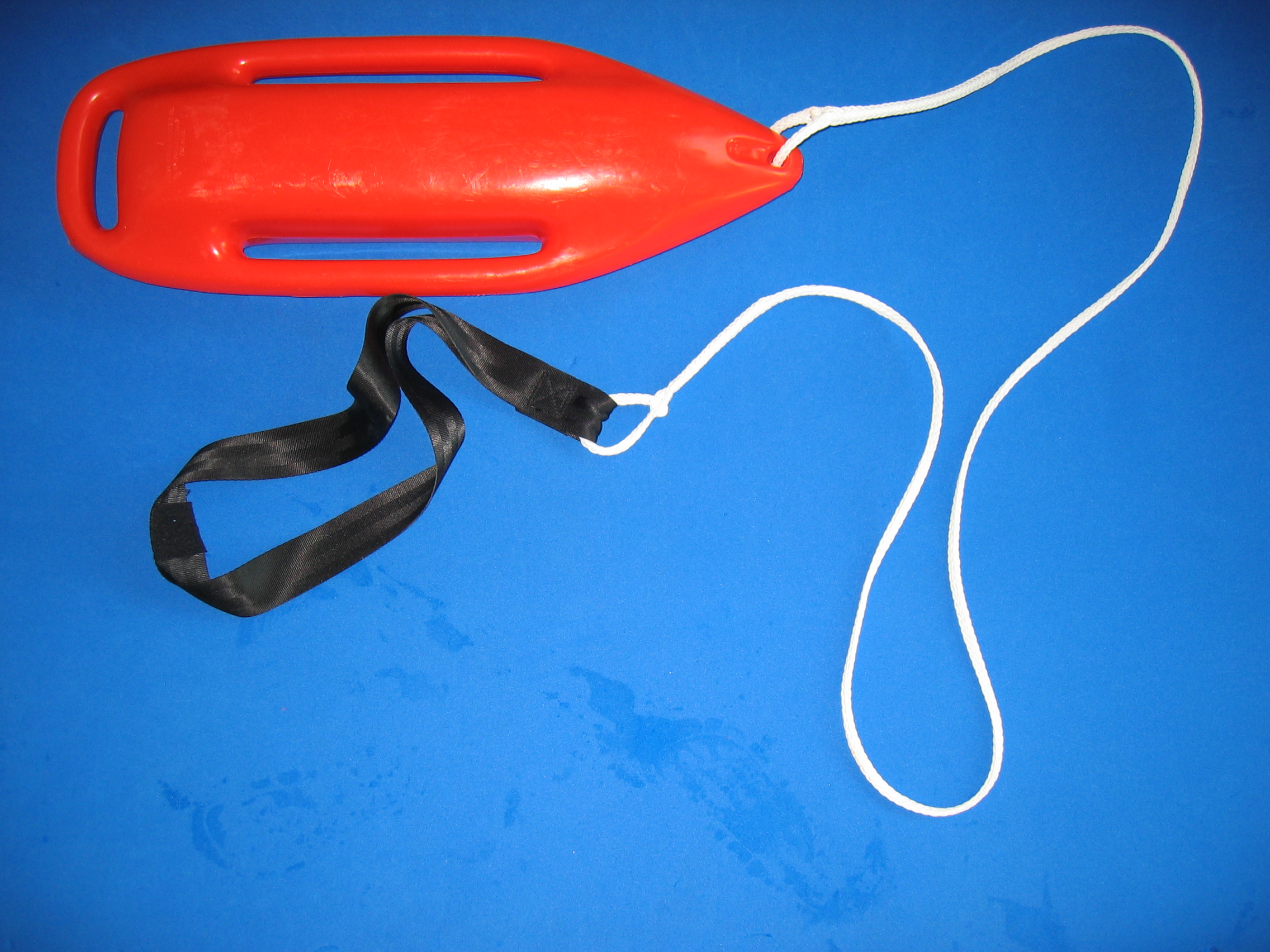
A rescue buoy, also called a Burnside buoy, or can.

The rescue tube is usually made of vinyl, and is buoyant enough to support the full weight of a rescuer and several victims. The tube has a long leash that the lifeguard wears around the body to tow the tube along while swimming a long distance. The rescue tube is usually red, but can come of a variety of colors. Rescue tubes often have the words "Guard" or "Lifeguard" printed on them. The tube may also have clips so that it may be wrapped around a person.

The rescue buoy is a hollow plastic rescue flotation device. It is also referred to as a torpedo buoy (often called a "torp") because of its shape. Because of its rigidity, it is slightly more hazardous in surf conditions. However, the rescue buoy generally has more buoyancy than a rescue tube, allowing the rescuer to assist multiple victims There are several colors and sizes available commercially. The rails, or sides, of the buoy have handles allowing victims to grab on. Like the tube, the buoy is connected by a rope to a strap the rescuer wears. This allows them to swim while towing the buoy and victim. The buoy may also be connected to a landline device, which allows individuals on shore to pull the rescuer and victims back to shore.

Early versions were constructed of aluminum, wood, cork, and fiberglass, with rope rails.

== History ==
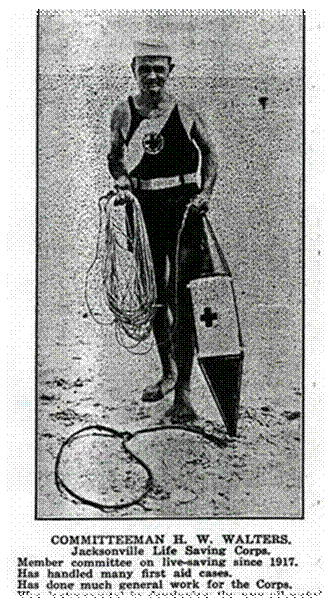
Walters with first Torpedo Buoy

=== Landline ===
A lifeguard would swim out the victim while attached to the line, also known as a reel and line. The lifesaver, while still attached, would clutch the victim and would be rapidly pulled back to shore by others. This was inefficient as the line produced drag for the lifeguard and was at risk of becoming tangled. Another disadvantage was the need for two or more persons for operation; it was also inadequate in cases with multiple rescues simultaneously occurring at different locations.

=== Rescue can ===
First created by Captain Henry Sheffield in 1897, the first "rescue can" was made of sheet metal and pointed at both ends. It caused little drag but occasionally produced harm to the lifeguard and the victim. As the design was switched from metal to aluminum with rounded ends, injuries would still occur.

=== Walters Torpedo Buoy ===
The Walters Torpedo Buoy was invented in 1919 by Henry Walters of the American Red Cross Volunteer Life Savings Corps.

=== Peterson Tube ===
Created in 1935, Pete Peterson produced an inflatable rescue tube with snap hooks molded onto one end and a 14-inch strap on the other. The design was further improved upon in the late 1960s with the production of closed-cell foam rubber.

=== World War II rescue buoy ===
See: Rescue buoy (Luftwaffe)

During World War II, at the instigation of German Generaloberst Ernst Udet, large buoys were deployed in the English Channel for downed Luftwaffe flyers. Each included a 43-square-foot (4.0 m^{2}) enclosed cabin and a radio transmitter. One can be seen in the British films One of Our Aircraft is Missing (1942) and We Dive at Dawn (1943).

=== Burnside Buoy ===
Bob Burnside coordinated with Ron Rezek for the development of a plastic rescue buoy. A wood prototype was approved by the Board of Directors of the National Surf Line Saving Association in 1968.

=== Robotic rescue buoy ===
EMILY (Emergency Integrated Lifesaving Lanyard) is a robotic rescue buoy made by Hydronalix.

== Usage ==
While approaching the victim, the lifeguard allows the rescue buoy to trail behind. Once the lifeguard makes contact with the victim, they hand over the rescue buoy to the victim and bring them ashore. The buoyancy of the rescue buoy, along with the reassuring talk, aims to comfort and calm the victim.

=== Water entry ===
The three major components of a rescue flotation device (RFD) are the lanyard, float, and harness. The lanyard and harness can trip up the lifeguard during the entry run, so care must be taken upon handling the RFD. The lifeguard must carry the rescue buoy until the beach visitors are not at risk of getting hurt.

=== Removal from water ===
If surf conditions are rough, the lifeguard may carry the rescue buoy completely out of the water. An unsecured rescue buoy could potentially wash up with force against the lifeguard or victim.

=== Fouling ===
Fouling occurs when the lanyard wraps around an object jeopardizing the lifeguard. The attachment between the lanyard and lifeguard must allow for quick release in case of emergencies.

=== Lanyard length ===
The length of the lanyard is crucial, as it must help concise and efficient rescue. It must be long enough for the lifeguard to kick without the buoy in the way, and it must be short enough to avoid fouling.
