= Saint Anne, Alderney =

Saint Anne
- Town
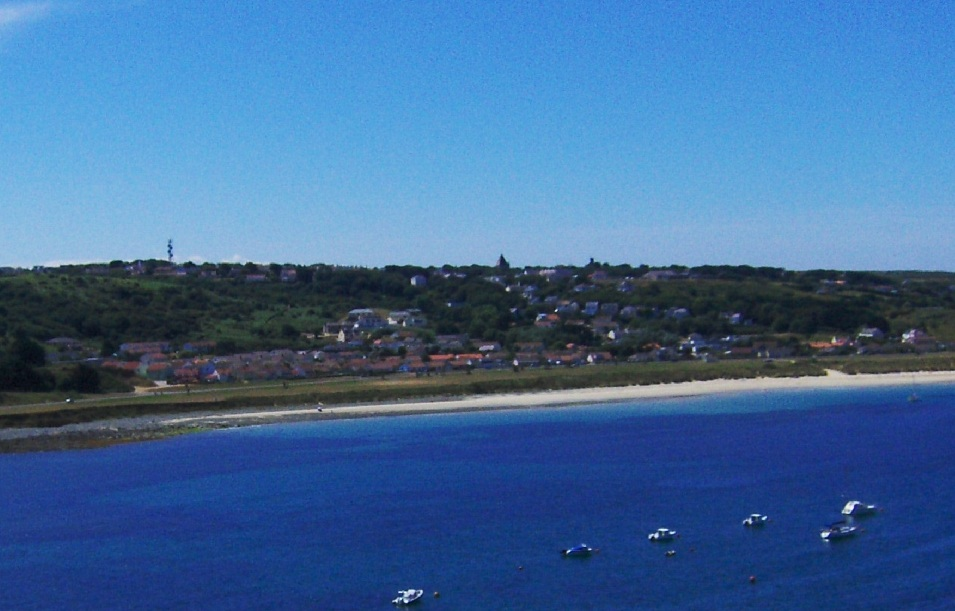
- Saint Anne

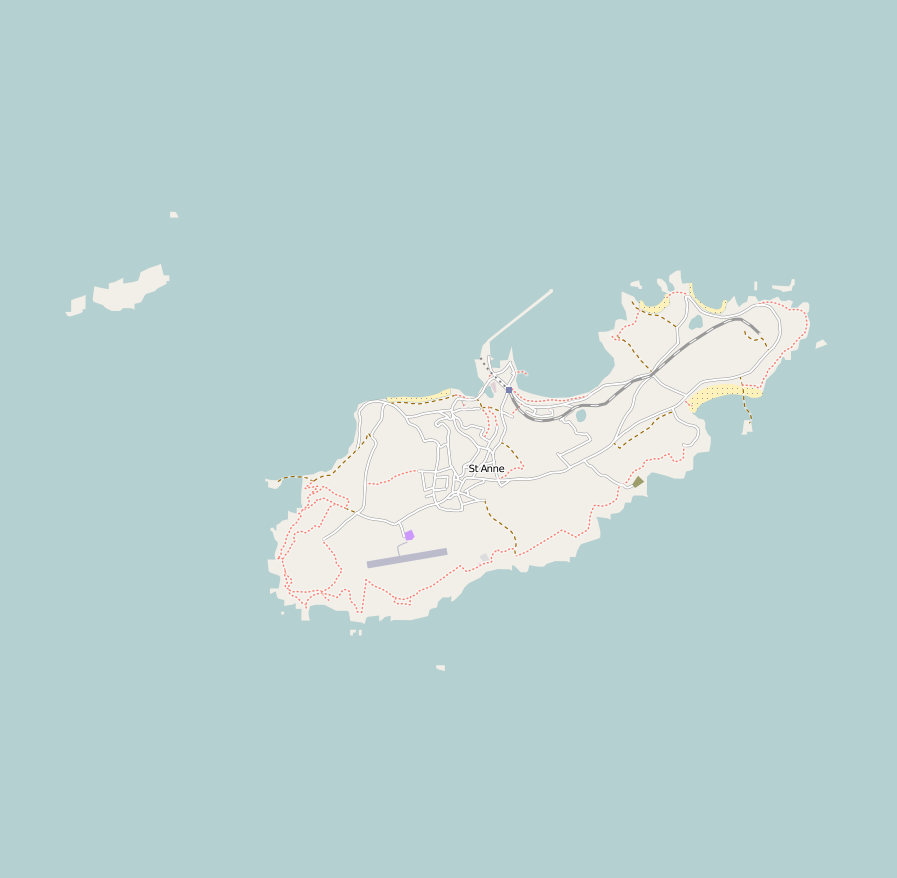
- Saint Anne in Alderney

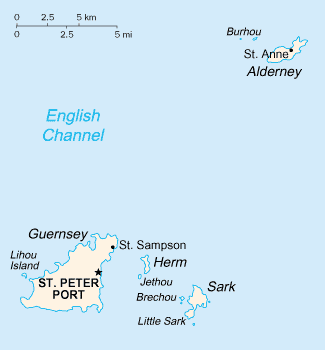
- St Anne is clearly marked on Alderney in the north east.

- Location in the Channel Islands
- Coordinates: 49°42′48″N 2°12′21″W
- Crown Dependency: Guernsey, Channel Islands
- Island: Alderney

Population (2,010 (approx.))
  - Total: 2,000

Saint Anne is the main town and only parish on the island of Alderney in the Bailiwick of Guernsey. It serves as the administrative center of the island, housing the autonomous States of Alderney Chamber. Saint Anne lies 1 mile south of Braye Harbour, which connects Alderney with Saint Peter Port in Guernsey and Dielette in France.

== Geography ==
Saint Anne is located about 10 miles (15 km) off the coast of Auderville in the Manche department of the Normandy region of north-western France. As of 2010, it has an estimated population of 2,000, compared to an estimated 2,400 who actually live on the island; they have traditional names such as vaches (French for cows) and lapins (French for rabbits, given after the rabbits found in the island). The town dominates much of the island, almost extending up to the Braye Harbour to its north, which is the main port of entry to the island and the town. It is located on a high ground at the centre of the island on the northwest direction.

Victoria Street, founded in 1836 and serving as the town's main thoroughfare, is the commercial hub with shops, pubs and restaurants, along with banking and post office services flanking both sides of the street. The museum presents pictures of the island with dramatic presentation of its military history; the town and the island having earned the epithet "Gibraltar of the Channel" during wartime. France is seen from here, as it is only 8 miles (13 km) away from the island. The Alderney Journal, the locally produced newspaper, has an office on Ollivier Street.

The Luftwaffe command bunker and tower and the German naval tactical headquarters were both located in St Anne during the Second World War.

St Anne is also the name of the only Church of England parish in the island. The ancient parish church dedicated to the Virgin Mary, which was at the lower end of the main street, fell into ruins and was replaced in the late 1580s by a chapel of St. Anne. The parish church of St. Anne was renovated in 1850. After the Second World War, the church was renovated again.

== Climate ==
The climate in St. Anne is temperate, moderated by the sea, and summers are usually warmer than elsewhere in the British Isles.

Under the Köppen climate classification, St. Anne has an oceanic climate, however it exhibits characteristics of a Warm-summer Mediterranean climate(csb). St. Anne experiences cool, wet winters and mild summers with moderate rainfall. February is the coldest month with an average high of 8 C ( F), and a low of 6 C ( F). July and August are the warmest months, with an average high of 18 C ( F), and a low of 15 C ( F). December is the wettest month with 72 mm (2.83 in) of rain, and June is the driest month with 17.8 mm (0.70 in). Snow is very rare. Average Sunshine hours are around 1930 annually.

Climate data for St. Anne, Alderney 2005-2015
Month	Jan	Feb	Mar	Apr	May	Jun	Jul	Aug	Sep	Oct	Nov	Dec	Year
Mean daily maximum °C (°F)	9.0 (48.2)	8.0 (46.4)	8.0 (46.4)	12.0 (53.6)	14.0 (57.2)	16.0 (60.8)	18.0 (64.4)	18.0 (64.4)	17.0 (62.6)	15.0 (59.0)	12.0 (53.6)	10.0 (50.0)	13.1 (55.6)
Mean daily minimum °C (°F)	6.0 (42.8)	6.0 (42.8)	6.0 (42.8)	6.0 (42.8)	10.0 (50.0)	13.0 (55.4)	15.0 (59.0)	15.0 (59.0)	14.0 (57.2)	12.0 (53.6)	10.0 (50.0)	7.0 (44.6)	10.0 (50.0)
Average precipitation mm (inches)	56.5 (2.22)	45.5 (1.79)	29.3 (1.15)	21.8 (0.86)	27.7 (1.09)	17.8 (0.70)	22.2 (0.87)	30.0 (1.18)	26.0 (1.02)	52.8 (2.08)	72.6 (2.86)	72.8 (2.87)	474.9 (18.70)
Average precipitation days (≥ 0.2 mm)	19.0	15.9	16.3	13.3	12.2	10.7	9.9	10.1	13.3	17.0	19.2	19.5	176.4
Source: timeanddate.com

== History ==
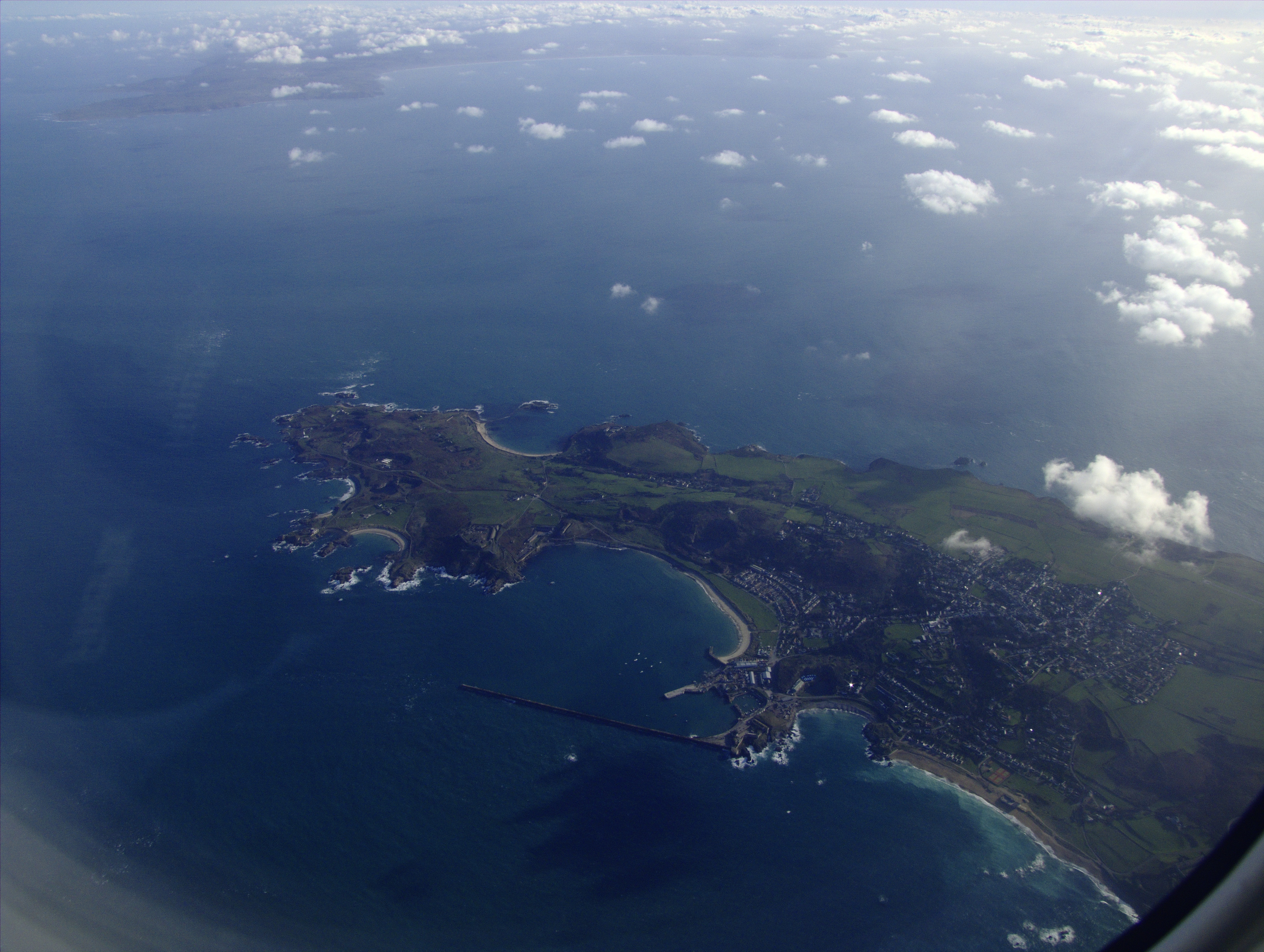
Mid-December 2009 aerial view of Alderney and Saint Anne. Notice how the town (towards the right) dominates about half of the island

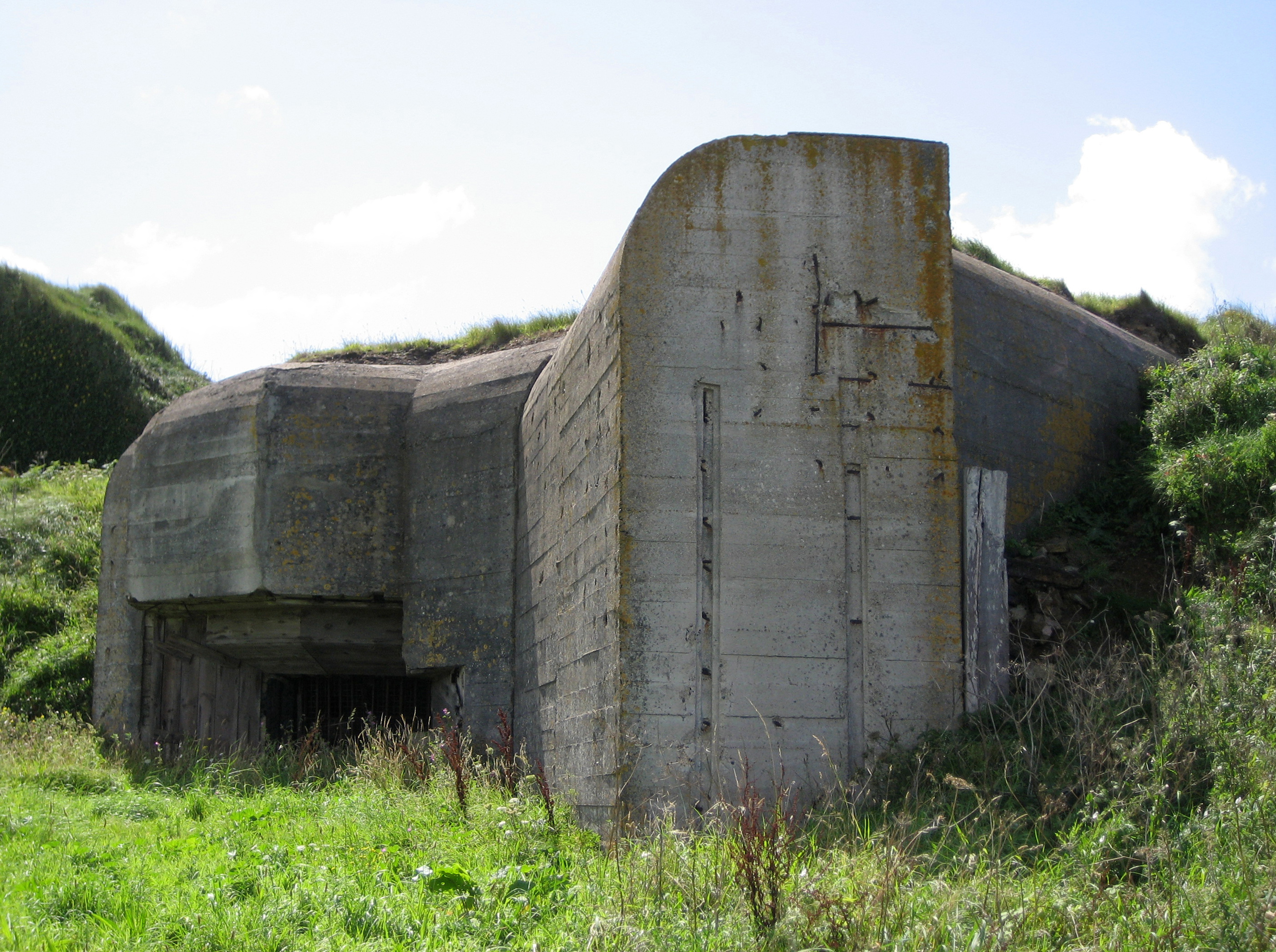
Alderney is still covered in German fortifications built by concentration camp slave labour

The founding of St Anne can be traced to the 15th century. During the Second World War, in the period between 1940 and 1945, Germans occupied the entire island, with their headquarters and military establishments located at St. Anne. The island's entire population, including that of the town, was evacuated before the islands were invaded in 1940. The Germans converted the place into a concentration camp; the labour force of 6,000 suffered untold miseries and many fatalities.

During this period the island and the town became a German fort. The Luftwaffe built a bunker and tower in the town. The tower, known as a "water tower", was a multistorey structure which housed the headquarters of the German Defence Forces of Army, Navy and Air Force. All these units had their own establishments with bunkers and reinforced structures, each with independent telecommunication network facilities. The defence system featured a network of tunnels dug in the several islands, including Jersey, Guernsey and Alderney. Within Alderney, nine such tunnels connected all the fortifications, with the headquarters centred at St Anne. These tunnels had a clear rock cover of 35 metres (115 ft), which made them impregnable to aerial bombing.

The court house in New Street, also used for sittings of the States of Alderney, dates originally from 1850. The court room was destroyed by the German occupying forces but rebuilt in 1955.

Alderney's official records were mostly destroyed during the Second World War, but family history volunteers have compiled all of the available records, both civil (except censuses) and ecclesiastical, and have contacted those persons who could provide further information. Several hundred families in various regions of the island, with genealogies tracing to the 1800s, have been categorized as old Alderney families, Breakwater families and others, with family names of Duplain, Gaudion, Hougez, Le Vallée, Ollivier, Pezet, Audoire, Batiste, Barbenson and Renier, Le Cocq, Le Mesurier, Sebire and Simon. As the island was re-surveyed after the German occupation, no land records are available for the period before 1945, although baptism registers since 1662 have been located from several sources.

The British Pound and the Guernsey Pound are both legal tender on the island. Commemorative coins of Alderney have been issued since 1989.

== Noted places ==
Some of the noted places in St Anne town are St Anne's Church, the Island Hall and the St Anne Museum. Public facilities include the logically arranged network of harbour, roads, airport, railway (the only one in the Channel Islands), school and hospital.

=== Alderney Society Museum ===
Alderney Society Museum, the principal museum in Alderney, is located in the Old School House on High Street in central St Anne. Exhibits there reflect the history of the town and include a collection of rare maps, a list of British regiments stationed in Alderney starting with 1732, old records, the 1940 Census of Alderney, finds of the Elizabethan shipwreck, and many rare artefacts. The museum is administered by the Alderney Society, which established it in 1966 with the purpose of creating "an organisation dedicated to the historical, environmental and scientific promotion of the island of Alderney". The museum was fully registered in 1993 and received the Museums and Galleries’ Gulbenkian Award for "most outstanding achievement" presented by Charles, Prince of Wales in 1999.

=== Royal Connaught Square ===
Royal Connaught Square in the heart of the town takes its name from Prince Arthur, Duke of Connaught and Strathearn, who visited the island with Queen Victoria. Island Hall on the north side of the square was built in 1763 by Governor John Le Mesurier and served as Alderney's Government House, and later as a Roman Catholic convent school. It now houses the library and museum. Nearby is Les Mouriaux House, which was built in 1779 by Peter Le Mesurier, John's son, and later visited by Queen Victoria and then Queen Elizabeth II in 1956. It was the residence of the first President of Alderney, Captain Sidney Herivel, from 1949 to 1970. Connaught (Irish: Connacht), is one of the four provinces of Ireland.

=== HMS Affray ===
There is a memorial in Saint Anne to the sinking of the submarine HMS Affray and the loss of all 75 persons on the submarine. It was unveiled 16 April 2012.

== Transport ==
The town and the island are easily accessible by sea and air. France is 10 miles (15 km) across the sea. It is 32 km (20 mi) to the northeast corner of the Bailiwick of Guernsey (of which it is a part) and 97 km (60 mi) from the south coast of England.

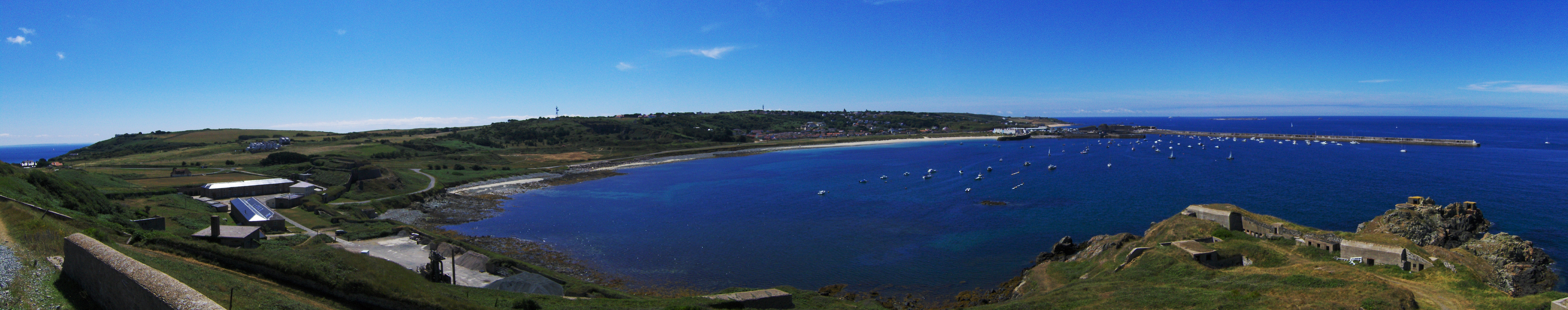
Complete view of the Braye Harbour

Its main port of entry, including for freight, is Braye Harbour, a commercial harbour, a short distance from the town. Also known as Alderney Harbour, Braye is located on the north side of the island at the mouth of the English Channel. It has one of the longest harbour walls in Europe and is, in fact, the longest such harbour wall in the British Isles. The harbour faces out onto the Swinge, which is part of the English Channel. Braye is effectively a suburb of St Anne.

The three-runway Alderney Airport is about 1.2 miles (1.9 km) from the town. Alderney Airport (IATA: ACI, ICAO: EGJA) is the only airport on the island of Alderney. Built in 1935 and operating since 1936, Alderney Airport was the first airport in the Channel Islands. Located 1 NM (1.9 km; 1.2 mi) southwest of St Anne, it is the closest Channel Island airport to the south coast of England and the coast of France.

Aurigny Air Services (founded in Alderney in 1968), are the only commercial airline that operate flights to and from this airport.

== Civic facilities ==
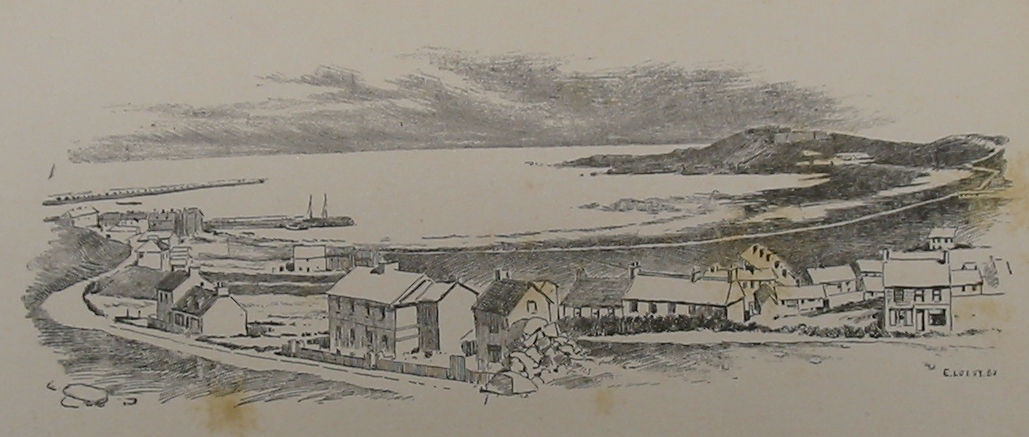
Historical illustration of Newtown and Braye Harbour

Sporting facilities are available in the area, including Alderney Cricket Club and Alderney Golf Course, situated to the east of St Anne. The town has a primary school, a secondary school and a post office as well as hotels, restaurants, banks and shops.

The court house in New Street, also used for sittings of the States of Alderney, dates originally from 1850. The court room was destroyed by the German occupying forces but rebuilt in 1955.

The main town is given the epithets, "piquant picturesque town" and "pastel painted village" and is also called St. Anne. The main cemetery is Longis Cemetery.

== Healthcare ==
The principal hospital on Alderney is the Mignot Memorial Hospital, located in the northern part of St. Anne. Serving a population of 2,400, the hospital was established in 2008 and has 24 beds, twelve of which are designated for medical, post-operative, maternity, or paediatric care.

As Alderney, unlike the UK, is not covered by the National Health Service, the hospital is effectively a private practice in which a fee is payable for all care provided. Treatment received by patients in the Accidents and Emergency Department and immediate necessary treatment given by a GP, however, is without charge.

The hospital has two local general practitioners and visiting specialists—especially from the Princess Elizabeth Hospital in Guernsey, which acts as the Mignot Hospital's parent institution—hold out-patient clinics. The hospital has a 24-hour accident and emergency clinic, a physiotherapy department and a small radiography unit. Women giving birth are generally taken to Guernsey.

== In literature ==
A.C. Swinburne's poem Les Casquets is based on the Houguez family, who actually lived on those islets for 18 years. The Houguez were originally from Alderney, and the poem describes their life on Les Casquets. The daughter falls in love with a carpenter from Alderney, but moving to his island finds life there too busy. She finds the "small bright streets of serene St Anne" and "the sight of the works of men" too much and returns to Les Casquets.

== Bibliography ==
- Coysh, V. (1985). Channel Islets: The lesser Channel Islands. Guernsey: Guernsey Press.
- Lemprière, R. (1970). Portrait of the Channel Islands. London: Hale. ISBN 0-7091-1541-5
