= Mignot Memorial Hospital =

- States of Guernsey

Geography
- Location: Crabby, Alderney
- Coordinates: 49.7203°N 2.2059°W

Services
- Emergency department: Yes
- Beds: 22

History
- Opened: 2008

Links
- Website: www.gov.gg/lemignot

Mignot Memorial Hospital is the principal hospital in Alderney, Channel Islands. It is located in the northern part of St. Anne, and operates as part of the States of Guernsey Health and Social Services Department. The hospital was established in 2008 and has 22 beds, serving Alderney's population of 2,300. 14 beds are used for continuing care; 8 of the beds are used for medical, post-operative, maternity or paediatric care.

== Layout ==
The hospital complex was developed in two phases. In the first phase of construction, which replaced an old temporary structure built in 1960s, was the ward complex with 14 single rooms, two maternity wards and two examination rooms. This phase was completed in May 2007 and a formal inauguration was attended by The Princess Royal. The BBC gave coverage to the new hospital prior to its inauguration. Soon thereafter, the second phase which involved construction of five intensive care wards and outpatient services with an additional entrance was also completed in 2008.

== Modern equipment ==
It has a modern X-ray unit. A diagnostic instrument manufactured and supplied by Siemens Healthcare to the hospital is the "MULTIX TOP analogue X-ray system". This radiographic system replaced an older version, which was in use in the hospital for 14 years. The new X-ray equipment has enhanced the capability of the hospital in radiography by providing superior quality of images and total manoeuvrability of the equipment. The advantage of this instrument is stated to be “the ergonomic design of the ceiling-mounted X-ray system, which enables radiographers to access patients from all sides of the table.”

== Services ==
Residents of Guernsey, Alderney, Herm or Jethou paying Social Security contributions are covered by the Specialist Health Insurance Scheme and so may receive specialist care and treatment free of charge at the hospital. Patients from countries with a reciprocal health agreement with Guernsey are exempt from charges. Alderney residents may choose to be treated privately at the hospital.

The hospital has two GPs and occasional visiting specialists who hold out-patient clinics, especially from the Princess Elizabeth Hospital in Guernsey which acts as a parent institution to the Mignot Memorial Hospital of Alderney. The hospital has a 24-hour accident and emergency clinic, a physiotherapy department and a small radiography unit.

== Legal amendment ==
Subsequent to the opening of the new hospital in Alderney, legal amendments have been issued with changes made in the rules existing since 1997. An Ordinance titled “the Health Service (Alderney Hospital Benefit) (Amendment) Ordinance, 2008” has been issued with modifications in “paragraph 3(a), for the definition of "the Alderney hospital contract", as inserted in section 39(1) of the Law of 1990 by the Ordinance of 1997” substituted by "the Alderney hospital contract" means any agreement, for the time being in force, for the provision of Alderney hospital benefit at the Mignot Memorial Hospital, Alderney, made between the States of Guernsey and a supplier of medical care services approved for the purposes by the States Health and Social Services Department;" with additional provisions related to nursing.
