= Braye Harbour =

Braye Harbour Alderney Harbour
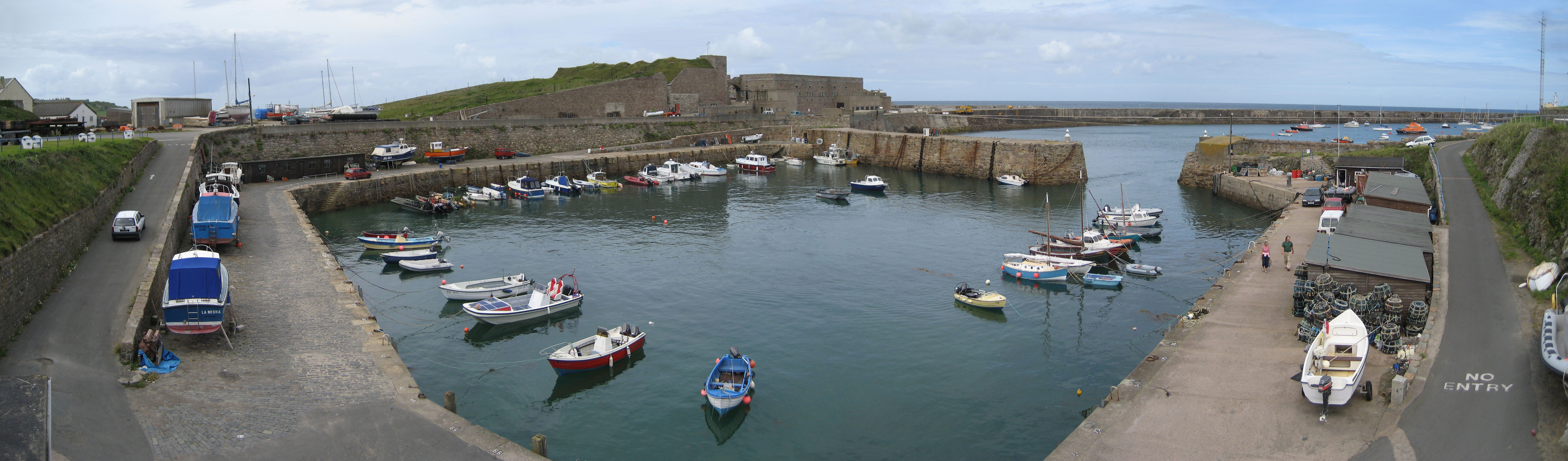
- Braye Inner harbour – outer harbour and breakwater in the background
- Interactive map of Braye Harbour; Alderney Harbour

Location
- Country: Channel Islands
- Location: Alderney
- Coordinates: 49.72933°N 02.192°W

Details
- Opened: Old harbour 1736, new harbour in 1857
- No. of berths: +70
- No. of piers: 2

Braye Harbour (also known as Alderney Harbour) is the main harbour on the north side of the island of Alderney, in the Channel Islands, a dependency of the British Crown. A 3,000 feet (910 m) breakwater was built by the Admiralty to protect the Navy in the 19th century shelters Braye Harbour. The harbour faces out onto the Swinge, which is part of the English Channel, and it is at Braye that most of the island's freight comes in. Braye is more or less a suburb of St Anne, the island capital; the centre of St Anne lies approximately 1 mile from the harbour.

The harbour precinct contains harbour facilities, a knitwear factory, a sailing club, toilets, and several places offering food and drink.

== History ==
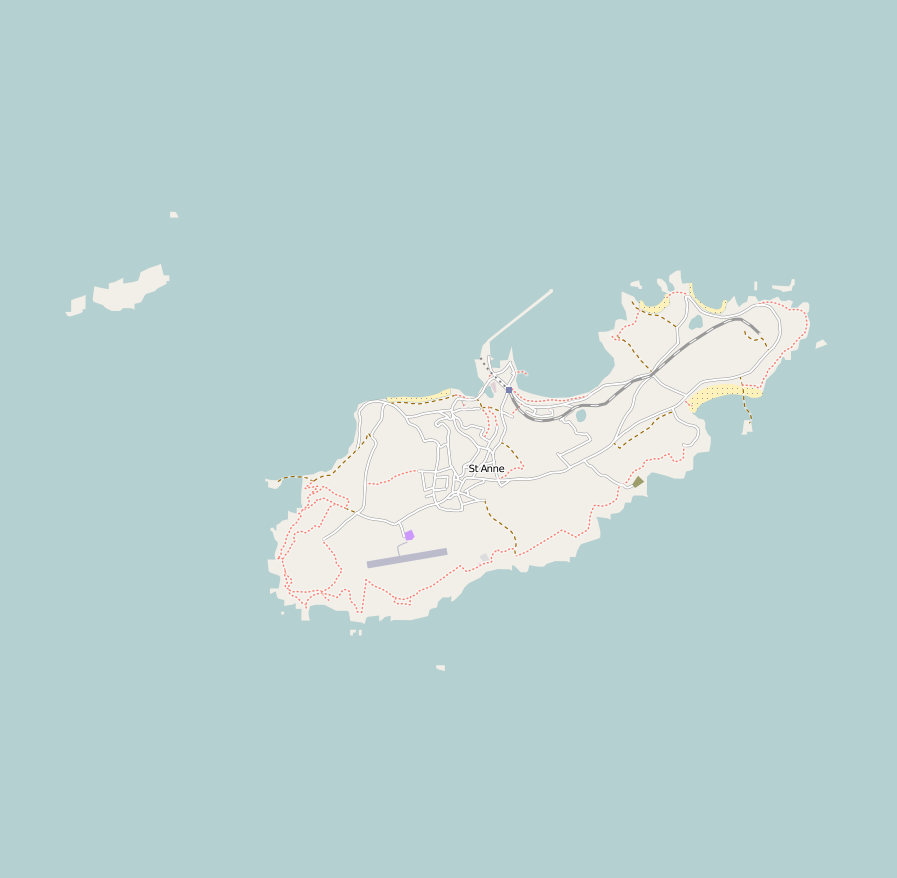
Map of Alderney showing the harbour on the north of the island

The original main harbour at Longis Bay was built in 1736 by Henry Le Mesurier, Governor of Alderney, at his own cost. The old harbour was not safe even for ships of 40 to 60 tons capacity, as the current entering the bay during storms endangered the beams of the ship that supported the deck. In 1807, twenty ships moored at this harbour were lost or damaged and the stone protection works were swept away by the sea. Building a new harbour became inescapable, as it was felt that the bay would provide a "safe and capacious harbour" for use by on line ships. Trade and commerce first developed with building of a jetty at Braye Harbour.

Between 1847 and 1864 a massive breakwater was constructed. A tramway was laid down to carry the stone and these were tipped into the sea to form the breakwater. Messrs Walker and Burgess were the engineers and Jackson and Bean the contractors.

During the second world war the Germans put a boom across the harbour and incorporated a Rescue buoy into the boom.

== Harbour layout ==
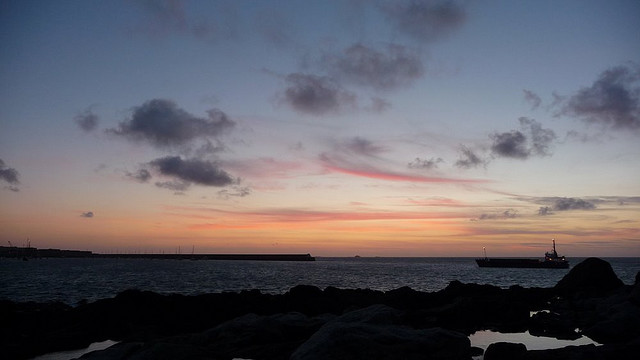
Braye Harbour at sunset

The western side of Braye Bay has been extended towards the east with a pier, which has created this sheltered artificial harbour. The best time to enter the harbour is during rising tide, as it dries when at low water neaps. In 1859, when the artificial harbour was built, lighting facilities to guide the ships through the entry channel or "fairway channel" were also fixed, as directed by the Hydrographic Office. Lights were fixed at two levels. Two red leading lights were installed at the head of the harbour; one was fixed on a parapet wall at a height of 25 feet (7.6 m) above high water tide level and the other, an upper light, was placed on the north-east corner, placed at 55 feet (17 m) height above the maximum tide condition, about 370 yards (340 m) from the lower light location. Navigation guidelines were also prescribed for entry into the harbour, guided by the two lights. At present, there are five harbour fairway buoys. These are QG and QR at its outer end, and Q(2)G 5sec towards the centre, and QG (3) 5sec and QR (3) 5sec on approach to Little Crabby Harbour. 2FR (vert) lights mark the Commercial Quay end. FG and FR lights mark entrance to Little Crabby Harbour.

In the 19th century, according to the Admiralty charts of Braye Harbour, the depth of water was three fathoms at a distance of 450 feet (140 m) from the inner face of the western pier. It was also noted that from this pier, the four fathom depth line was at 400 ft from the eastern pier. Considering this situation, at that time, it was considered unsafe to moor ships of the Royal Navy here.

The anchorage is in the middle of the bay where there is firm ground of sand. However, rocky bed is also encountered, more so at the entrance to the harbour. Anchor lines are used in shoal areas when the tidal range in the spring season of up to 6.9 metres (23 ft) permits such a use. Special permission is essential for anchoring near the Braye jetty or even tying to the jetty. The speed of boats or ships approaching the harbour is limited to 4 knots.

Other safety precautions prescribed relate to watching the approach conditions from the Swinge or the Race ends of the harbour as the tidal conditions at these locations are in the range of 9 knots and 11 knots respectively. The most preferred option is to negotiate these two approaches during low tide conditions. All moorings are essentially on buoys, within the protection of the breakwater. Since there is no slipway, it would be necessary to use "dingy to get ashore to where there is a public pontoon system especially for dingy tenders".

Even though there are a number of other anchorage locations in the Alderney at Saye Bay, Longis Bay, Telegraph Bay, Hannaine of Fort Clonque, and Burhou – the Lug, SW end of Burhou (these are not preferred as compared to Braye Barbour) where conditions are favourable only in calm weather and/or offshore winds conditions.

Daily Tidal Charts with times and heights of high and low waters have been published for the harbour by the States of Alderney Harbour Authority and their agents.

For customs clearance and entry to the Island, Braye is the designated port of entry and it is compulsory for all vessels entering from outside the Bailiwick to clear customs formalities at this harbour. The commercial quay here is being developed now. Following these developments, two large container vessels berthed simultaneously at Alderney. The first largest vessel to be berthed here recently was the Huelin Dispatch.

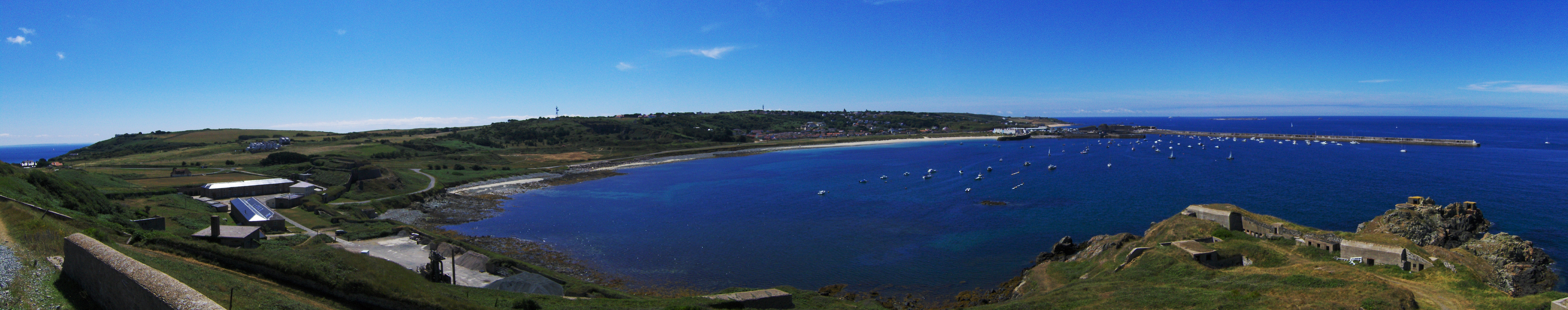
Picture overlooking Braye Bay – Braye Harbour in the background

== Breakwater ==
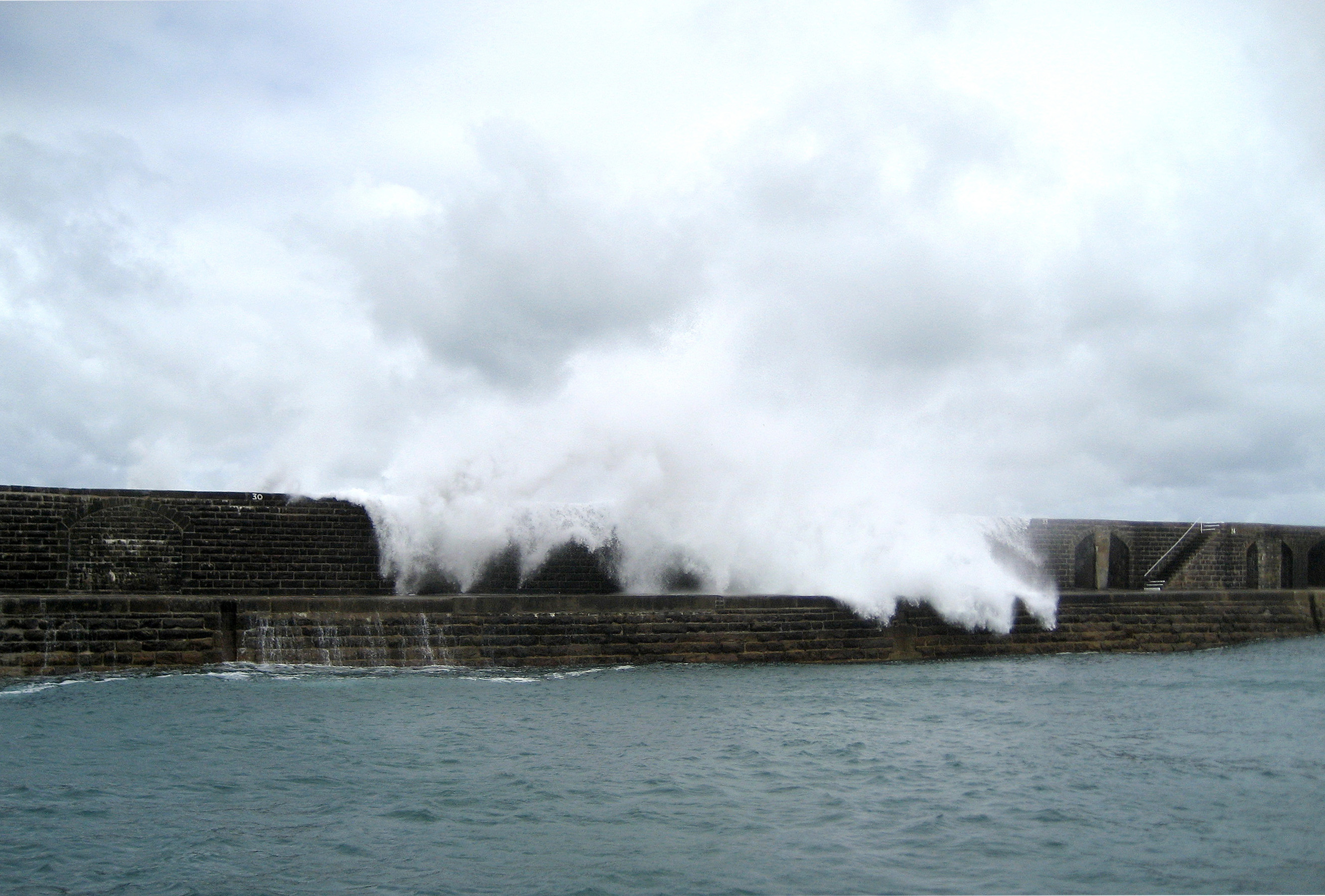
Alderney Breakwater at Braye Harbour

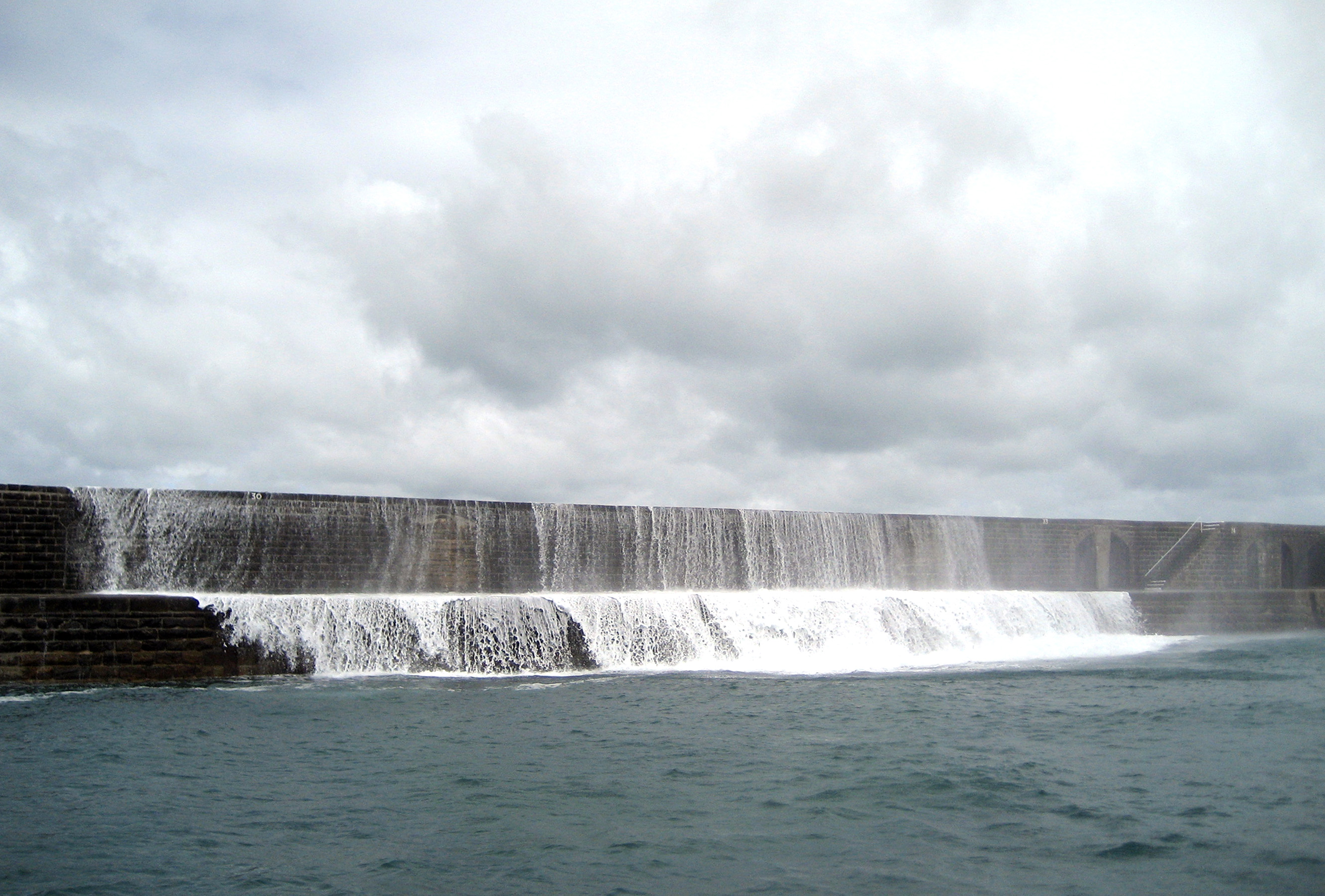
Alderney Breakwater at Braye Harbour in operation

The 3,000 feet (910 m) breakwater at Braye Harbour was built by the British to protect ships of the Navy between 1847 and 1864. Originally, two arms were planned as a protection to the harbour from the tidal race of The Swinge, but only the western arm was completed due to improving relations with the French. When construction stopped the breakwater was 4,827 feet (1,471 m) long, but within a year 1,780 feet (540 m) was abandoned to the sea following heavy gales. It gives only partial protection to the harbour, as during storms the breakwater suffers damage and is constantly repaired and maintained. Financial assistance for maintenance was provided by the UK until the 1980s, and since then by Guernsey in lieu of defense payments required to maintain The Bailiwick of Guernsey's status as a British Crown Dependency. The massive stone breakwater is generally used as a walk way to enjoy the scenic beauty of the bay, its harbour and the sea. The breakwater is now termed as "Victorian" and it provides safety to yachtsmen who sail in the harbour.

== Harbour facilities ==
Facilities available at the harbour are of the Harbour Master and Coastguard from its Harbour Master’s Office located at the SW end of the harbour and weather forecasts. The harbour has 70 yellow visitors’ mooring buoys to be used during good weather conditions; howsoever other mooring buoys here can be used only with prior permission. The nearest Railway Station is by the crossroads at the end of Braye Street, where a post box is also available.

Braye Harbour has a slipway but it doesn't have a marina (yet) and there are no alongside pontoon systems to berth to. There are plans to develop the marina. A 300-berth marina is expected to be built from spring 2011.

== Regulations ==
The main Channel Islands have their own Merchant Shipping Legislation. Hence, all charter angling and diving vessels that visit Braye Harbour should abide by it. The Harbour Authority acts as the Maritime Authority.
