= Rescue buoy (Luftwaffe) =

Floating World War II English Channel emergency shelters for downed German airmen

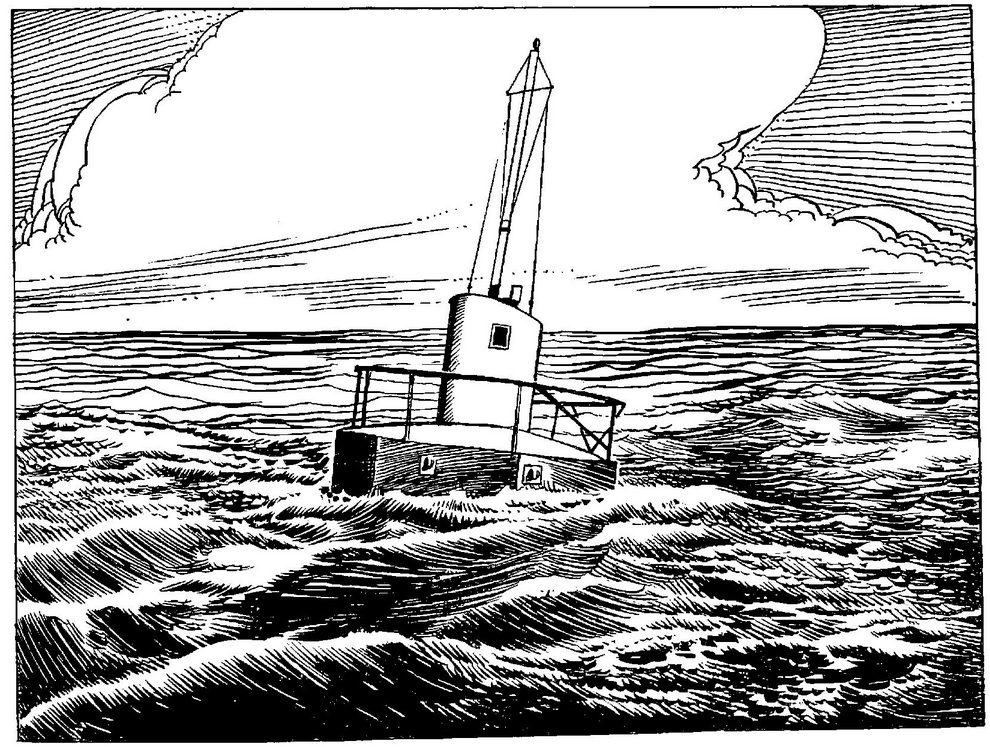
A Luftwaffe rescue buoy at sea

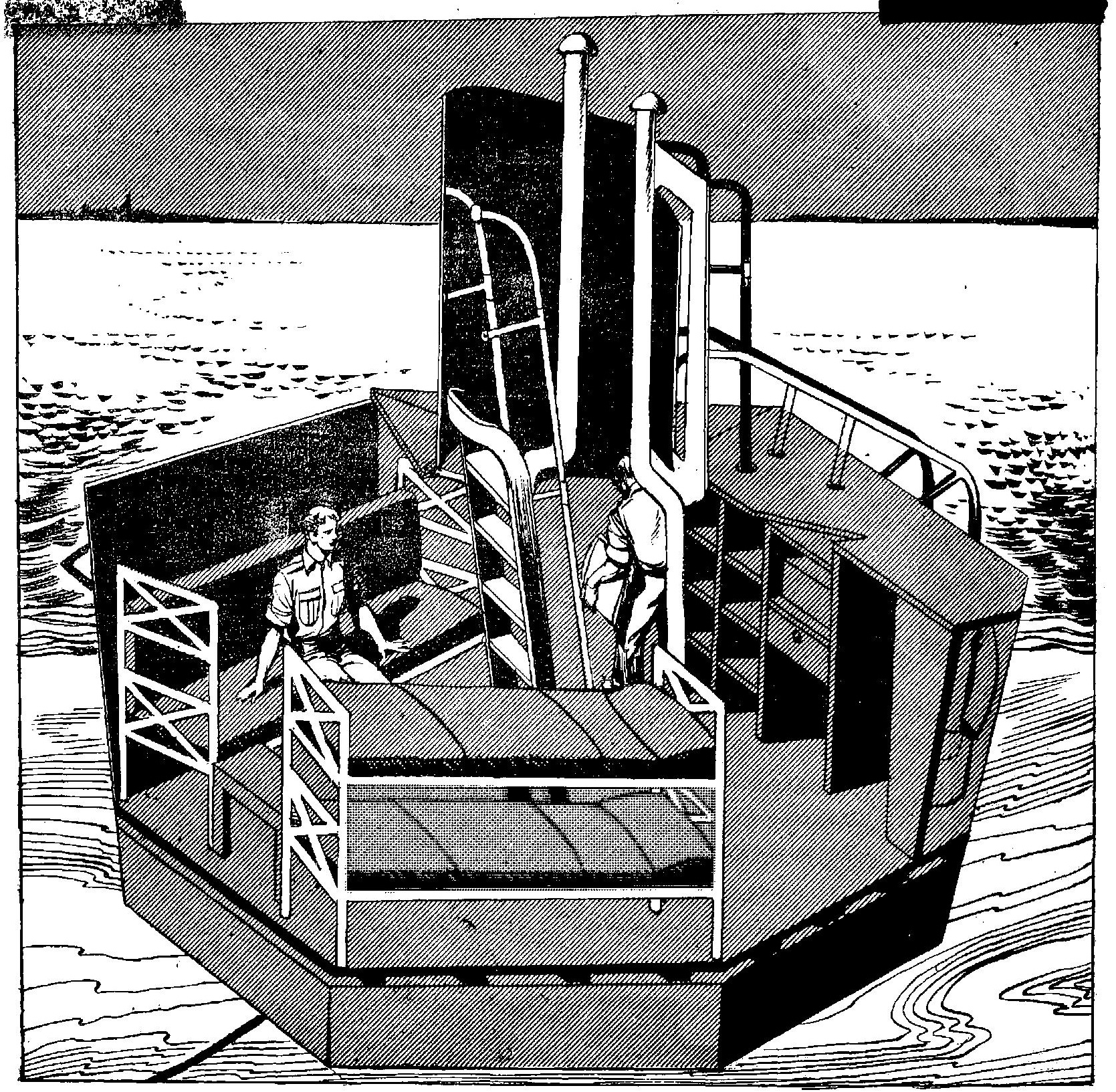
The interior of a Luftwaffe rescue buoy

The Luftwaffe's rescue buoy (Rettungsboje) was designed to provide shelter for the pilots or crew of aircraft shot down or forced to make an emergency landing over water.

== History ==
The buoys were developed for flyers of the Luftwaffe brought down while operating over the English Channel during the Battle of Britain. They were constructed under the direction of the German Ministry of Air Navigation in 1940 at the suggestion of Generaloberst Ernst Udet, Director-General of Equipment for the Luftwaffe. An alternative name for them was the Udet-Boje. The initial buoys were a simple design, 2 m (6 ft 7 in) high and 1 m × 5 m (3 ft 3 in × 16 ft 5 in) in size, offering little in the form of shelter. A flag pole allowed a flag or lamp to be hoisted, supplies included a basic medical kit, iron rations, water, life jackets and ropes. An improved buoy was designed and 50 were anchored in the English Channel during 1940. A German buoy is being restored in the bunker museum on the island of Terschelling, Netherlands.

== Design of improved buoy ==
The buoys were of square or hexagonal construction and had a floor space of about 4m² (43 square feet) with an 2.4m (8 feet) tall cabin rising above the float. On the upper deck of this cabin, there was an oval turret 1.8m (6 feet) high with a signal mast carrying a wireless antenna. Tube railings to which the distressed flyers could cling ran along the outer circumference below and above the water line. A ladder led up to the turret, in which there was a door opening into the cabin below. A 100 m (330 ft) red and yellow striped rope anchored the buoy but allowed a limited drift, thereby indicating the direction of the current to aircraft in distress. The buoy was painted light yellow above the water line, and red crosses against white oval backgrounds were painted on each side of the turret.

— Channel Islands Occupation Review No 38

The cabin accommodated four persons comfortably for several days, and in an emergency, the crews of several aircraft could be taken care of. It was electrically lit by storage batteries, but in case of a breakdown kerosene lamps or other lighting devices were provided. There were two double-deck beds and adequate cupboard space for first-aid equipment, dry clothing and shoes, emergency rations, and a water supply. Hot food could be prepared on an alcohol stove. Cognac to relieve chill and cigarettes to quiet the nerves were also provided. Games, stationery, playing cards, etc. afforded diversion until rescue was effected. Depleted supplies were always immediately replaced upon the arrival of the rescue ship. A tubular lifeboat was available for transferring the downed aviators from the buoy to the ship. Signalling was accomplished by hoisting a black anchor ball and a yellow and red striped flag on the mast during the day. At night, red and white lights in the turret indicated that rescued men were on board. A white anchor light on the mast was visible for 1 km (3,300 ft) or more. SOS signals giving the location of the buoy were automatically sent out by an emergency wireless transmitter. Signal pistols with red and white lights, white-light parachute flares, or a smoke, distress-signalling apparatus completed the signalling equipment. Other equipment included plugs to stop up bullet holes in the walls of the cabin and a pump for the expulsion of seepage.

— US War Department, Tactical and Technical Trends, No. 12, November 19, 1942

== Rescue ==
Being in fixed locations, they could be checked once or twice a day: if occupied, a seaplane or Flugsicherungboot (high speed launch) could be summoned. They saved many airmen that ships or seaplanes might have been too late to rescue.

== British equivalent ==
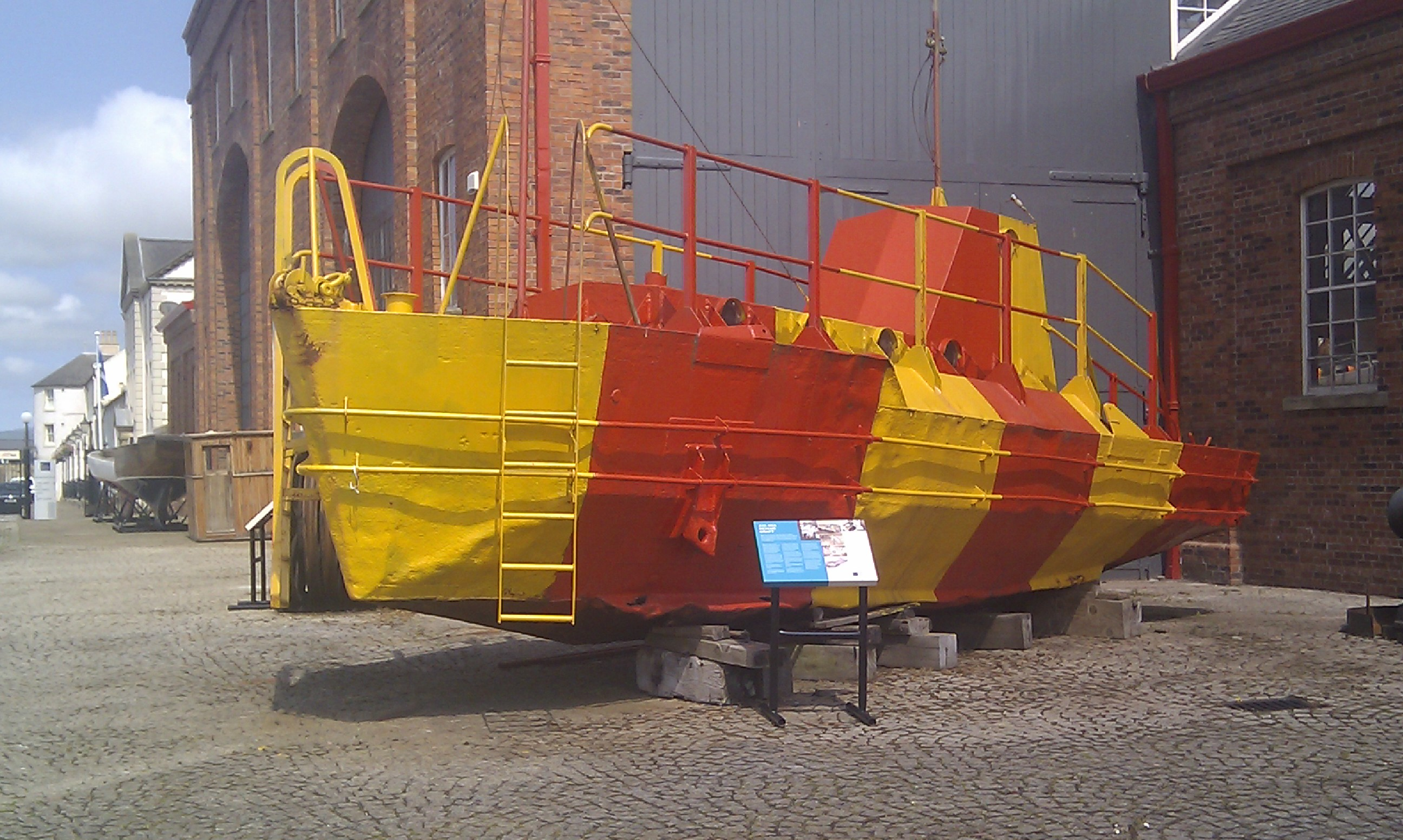
- Air Sea Rescue Float, ASR-10, displayed at the Scottish Maritime Museum at Irvine, 2013

General characteristics
- Length: 32 ft (9.8 m)
- Beam: 10 ft (3.0 m)
- Draught: 3 ft 3 in (1.0 m)
- Depth: 6 ft (1.8 m)

A British equivalent, the Air-Sea Rescue Float, was also used. They used a boat-shaped hull of welded steel. Sixteen were constructed and they were deployed under the main routes bombers took to and from continental Europe. They were equipped with cooking facilities, signal flags, a radio and six bunks. Food, blankets, clothing, drinking water and first-aid supplies were carried.

One example, ASR-10, is in the collection of the Scottish Maritime Museum. Its post-war career is unknown, but for many years it lay derelict on a slipway at Gourock, Scotland, before it was acquired by the museum.

== Defence usage ==
A rescue buoy was incorporated into the harbour boom at Braye Harbour in German-occupied Alderney, reputedly manned by three men armed with a machine gun.

== In film ==
Rettungsbojen have appeared in films from the World War II period: One of Our Aircraft Is Missing (1942) and We Dive at Dawn (1943).
