= The Swinge =

Coordinates: 49.723°N 2.239°W

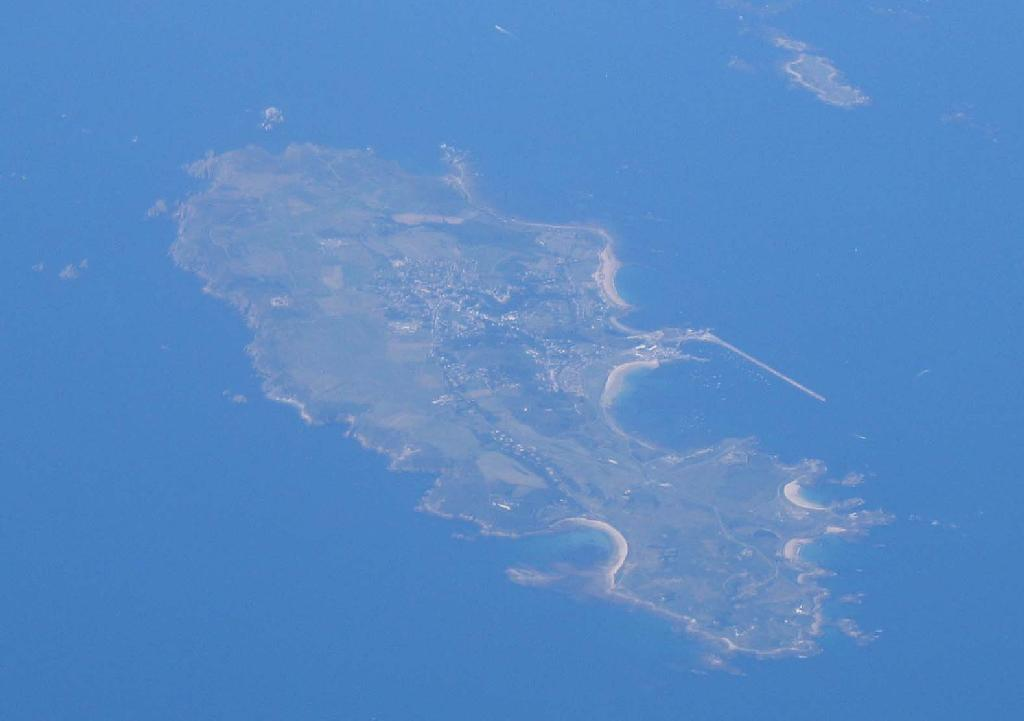
Aerial shot of Alderney (centre) and Burhou (upper right), with the Swinge in between

The Swinge is the strait between Alderney and Burhou in the Channel Islands. It often sees a furious tidal race (the Alderney Race), and Braye Harbour which faces it, has a mile-long breakwater to cope with this.

The etymology of the Swinge is probably Old Norse, related to Old Icelandic swinnr (swift, rapid)

Corbet Rock lies in the Swinge. Corbet Rock is said to have been named after the ancient Corbet family of the Channel Islands.

The Little Swinge is between Burhou and Les Nannels. The Race is the strait on the other side of Alderney.
