= We Dive at Dawn =

- Title card
- Directed by: Anthony Asquith
- Written by: Story and screenplay: Val Valentine; J. B. Williams; Uncredited: Frank Launder
- Produced by: Edward Black
- Starring: John Mills; Eric Portman
- Cinematography: Jack E. Cox
- Edited by: R. E. Dearing
- Music by: Louis Levy
- Production companies: Gaumont British Picture Corporation; Gainsborough Pictures
- Distributed by: General Film Distributors
- Release date: 15 April 1943
- Running time: 98 minutes
- Country: United Kingdom
- Language: English

We Dive at Dawn is a 1943 war film directed by Anthony Asquith and starring John Mills and Eric Portman as Royal Navy submariners in the Second World War. It was written by Val Valentine and J. B. Williams with uncredited assistance from Frank Launder. It was produced by Edward Black. The film's sets were designed by Walter Murton.

The film was crucial to establishing Mills as a star.

== Plot ==
In April 1942 Lieutenant Freddie Taylor and crewmates from the submarine Sea Tiger are given a week's leave after an unsuccessful patrol. Leading Seaman Hobson goes home to save his marriage, while a reluctant Torpedo Gunner's Mate Corrigan departs for his wedding in London. When the crew are recalled early Corrigan is relieved, though later regrets not finalizing his marriage. Sea Tiger has been assigned the top secret mission of sinking Nazi Germany's new battleship, the Brandenburg, before she transits the Kiel Canal for sea trials in the Baltic, and must put to sea immediately.

Crossing the North Sea, the submarine picks up three downed Luftwaffe pilots from a rescue buoy. When the submarine enters a minefield, one of the airmen frantically reveals that the Brandenburg has already reached the Baltic, hoping that this will convince his captors to turn back. Undeterred, Taylor takes Sea Tiger through the Danish straits. The airman is badly beaten by one of his comrades and later dies.

Upon spotting the Brandenburg, Sea Tiger fires all her torpedoes and then dives to evade the battleship's destroyer escort, which begins dropping depth charges. By expelling oil and other debris, including the body of the German airman, Taylor deceives the Germans into believing the submarine has sunk. Although they have escaped, the crew do not know whether their attack was successful and are running critically low on oil. Meanwhile, the Germans have Lord Haw Haw broadcast news of Sea Tiger's supposed destruction to Britain.

Taylor decides to abandon ship at the (fictional) Danish island of Hågø, but Hobson, a former merchant seaman who knows the area, convinces Taylor to let him go ashore to search for oil. Hobson succeeds in locating an oil store, and guides Sea Tiger into the harbour under cover of darkness, where they refuel with help from friendly Danish sailors. The German garrison gets wind of this and a firefight begins, but the crew fend them off with the loss of only one man.

On the return journey, a trawler informs Sea Tiger that she sank the Brandenburg. Sea Tiger returns to base flying the Jolly Roger for the first time. On shore, the crew are welcomed as heroes by their wives and girlfriends.

== Cast ==
- John Mills as Lieutenant Freddie Taylor, RN; Captain
- Louis Bradfield as Lieutenant Brace, RNR; First Officer
- Ronald Millar as Lieutenant Ronnie Johnson, RNVR; Third Officer
- Jack Watling as Lieutenant Gordon, RN; Navigating Officer
- Reginald Purdell as C/P.O. (Chief Petty Officer) "Dicky" Dabbs, Coxswain
- Caven Watson as C/P.O. Jock Duncan, Chief Engine Room Artificer
- Niall MacGinnis as C/P.O. Mike Corrigan, Torpedo Gunner's Mate
- Eric Portman as L/S (Leading Seaman) James Hobson, on hydrophones
- Leslie Weston as L/S Tug Wilson, Leading Torpedo Operator
- Norman Williams as "Canada", Periscope Operator
- Lionel Grose as "Spud", Torpedo Operator
- David Peel as "Oxford", Helmsman
- Philip Godfrey as "Flunkey", Steward
- Robb Wilton as "Pincher", Cook
- Joan Hopkins as Ethel Dabbs
- Walter Gotell as the ardent Nazi pilot, uncredited
- John Slater as Charlie
- Philip Friend as Captain Humphries

== Production ==
We Dive at Dawn was filmed at Gaumont-British Studios in London, with the co-operation of the British Admiralty. John Mills prepared for his role as the captain of Sea Tiger by sailing in a submarine on a training mission down the Clyde. He recalled a crash dive:

The ship then seemed to stand on her nose and I felt her speeding like an arrow towards the sea bed; charts and crockery went flying in all directions; I hung on to a rail near the periscope trying to look heroic and totally unconcerned; the only thing that concerned me was that I was sure that my face had turned a pale shade of pea-green.

Exterior shots of the submarines P614 and P615 were used for Sea Tiger (with the final number painted over to make "P61"). The vessels were a Turkish S-class submarine that had been part of a consignment ordered by the Turkish Navy from the British company Vickers in 1939. But with the outbreak of World War II, the four boats were requisitioned by the Royal Navy and designated the P611 class in the British Fleet. They were similar in design but slightly smaller than the British S class, although with a higher conning tower. The S-class boat HMS Safari also appears in the film.

== Home media ==
The film has been issued on VHS by Madacy Records and Timeless Multimedia among others, and on DVD by ITV DVD and Carlton.
