= One of Our Aircraft Is Missing =

- Theatrical release poster
- Directed by: Michael Powell; Emeric Pressburger
- Written by: Michael Powell; Emeric Pressburger
- Produced by: Michael Powell; Emeric Pressburger; Stanley Haynes
- Starring: Godfrey Tearle; Eric Portman; Hugh Williams; Bernard Miles; Hugh Burden; Emrys Jones; Googie Withers; Pamela Brown
- Cinematography: Ronald Neame
- Edited by: David Lean
- Distributed by: Anglo-American Film Corporation
- Release date: 27 June 1942
- Running time: UK: 102 minutes US: 82 minutes
- Country: United Kingdom
- Language: English
- Budget: £70,000 (est.)
- Box office: $478,939 (US rentals)

One of Our Aircraft Is Missing (stylised on screen as ......one of our aircraft is missing) is a 1942 British black-and-white war film, mainly set in the German-occupied Netherlands. It was the fourth collaboration between the British writer-director-producer team of Michael Powell and Emeric Pressburger and the first film they made under the banner of The Archers.

Although considered a propaganda film and made under the authority of the Ministry of Information as part of a series of film productions aimed at morale in the United Kingdom, it is elevated by the story and production values above the usual jingoistic fare. Today, One of Our Aircraft Is Missing is considered one of the "best of British films of the era".

A reversal of the plot of Powell and Pressburger's previous film, 49th Parallel (1941), One of Our Aircraft Is Missing has the British trying to escape with the help of various locals. In the 49th Parallel, the Germans stranded in Canada argued and fought amongst themselves, while the British fliers in this film work well together as a team.

== Plot ==
The crew of a Royal Air Force (RAF) Wellington bomber are forced to bail out over the Netherlands near the Zuider Zee after one of their engines is damaged during a night raid on Stuttgart. Five of the six airmen find each other; the sixth goes missing. The first Dutch citizens they encounter, led by English-speaking school teacher Else Meertens, are suspicious at first as no aircraft is reported to have crashed in the Netherlands (the abandoned bomber actually reaches England before crashing). After much debate and some questioning, the Dutch agree to help, despite their fear of German reprisals.

Accompanied by many of the Dutch, the disguised airmen, led by the pilots, bicycle through the countryside to a football match where they are passed along to the local burgomaster. To their astonishment, they discover their missing crewman playing for one of the teams. Reunited, they hide in a truck carrying supplies to Jo de Vries.

De Vries pretends to be pro-German, blaming the British for killing her husband in a bombing raid (whereas he is actually in England working as a radio announcer). She hides them in her mansion, despite the Germans being garrisoned there. Under cover of an air raid, she leads them to a rowing boat. The men row undetected to the sea, but a bridge sentry finally spots them and a shot seriously wounds the oldest man, Sir George Corbett, but they reach the North Sea.

They take shelter in a German rescue buoy, where they take two shot-down enemy aviators prisoner but not before one sends a radio message. By chance, two British boats arrive first. Because Corbett cannot be moved, they simply tow the buoy back to England. Three months later, he is fully recovered and the crew board their new four-engine heavy bomber, a Short Stirling.

== Cast ==
As appearing in screen credits (main roles identified):

- Hugh Burden as Flying Officer John Glyn Haggard, pilot of B for Bertie
- Eric Portman as Flying Officer Tom Earnshaw, second pilot
- Hugh Williams as Flight Lieutenant Frank Shelley, observer/navigator
- Emrys Jones as Sergeant Bob Ashley, wireless operator
- Bernard Miles as Sergeant Geoff Hickman, front gunner
- Godfrey Tearle as Pilot Officer Sir George Corbett, rear gunner
- Googie Withers as Jo de Vries
- Joyce Redman as Jet van Dieren
- Pamela Brown as Els Meertens
- Peter Ustinov as Priest
- Alec Clunes as Organist
- Hay Petrie as Burgomaster
- Roland Culver as Naval Officer
- David Ward as First German Airman
- Robert Duncan as Second German Airman
- Selma Vaz Dias as Burgomaster's wife (as Selma Van Dias)
- Arnold Marlé as Pieter Sluys
- Robert Helpmann as De Jong
- Hector Abbas as Driver
- James B. Carson as Louis
- Willem Akkerman as Willem
- Joan Akkerman as Maartje
- Peter Schenke as Hendrik
- Valerie Moon as Jannie
- John Salew as German Sentry
- William D'Arcy as German Officer
- Robert Beatty as Sgt. Hopkins
- Michael Powell as Despatching Officer (also a director-producer)
- Stewart Rome as Cmdr. Reynold

== Production ==
The title "One of Our Aircraft Is Missing" is taken from a phrase that was often heard in contemporary news reports in the UK after a bombing raid, "one [or often more] of our aircraft failed to return", which originally served as the working title of the screenplay but was then altered to a less-downbeat form. Although the screenplay was not completely developed by the time of production, Powell considered it "half-finished ... it remained (that way) for most of the production." One of the reasons for continual revisions to the screenplay were the constant advances in wartime technology that were occurring.

The Admiralty informed the producers and directors of the use of "lobster pots", floating steel platforms, hitherto unknown to the public, that had been anchored in the North Sea to facilitate rescue of downed airmen. When Powell learned of this innovation, he pointedly rewrote the screenplay to include this refuge as the means to deliver the crew to safety. With help from the Ministry of Information, permission to use these platforms was obtained.

The actors that were gathered for the film included recognised stage and screen talents such as Eric Portman, Hugh Williams and Godfrey Tearle, as well as newcomers such as Peter Ustinov, making his film debut. Although mainly centred on male roles, Powell encouraged Pressburger to create a number of significant female characters. The result were strong, credible roles for both Pamela Brown and Googie Withers as female Dutch Resistance leaders. The main leads, Hugh Burden, Eric Portman, Hugh Williams, Emrys Jones, Bernard Miles, and Godfrey Tearle, formed the crew of "B for Bertie" and introduced themselves and their characters' positions on board the bomber in a progressive sequence that was filmed, like most of the aircraft interiors, in a Vickers Wellington "shell" supplied by the RAF, with working features such as lighting and electrically powered turrets.

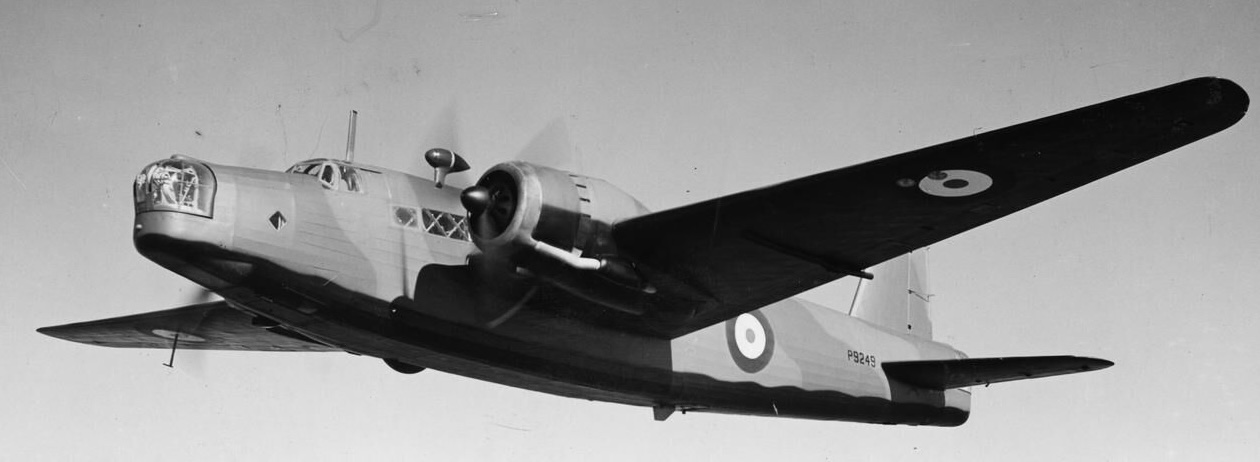
A Vickers Wellington bomber, a type featured in the film

To maintain an aura of authenticity, actual RAF bombers on "ops" (operations) were filmed, but the aerial scene of the bombing of Stuttgart was created using a large-scale model at Riverside Studios, Hammersmith. The giant Wellington replica actually covered the entire studio floor and was rigged with lights and fitted for effects shots, including explosions. On screen, the effect realistically simulated the flight and bombing raid depicted at the start of the film. Much of the outdoor sequences set in the Netherlands were shot at Boston, Lincolnshire and Kings Lynn, Norfolk; many of Boston town's landmarks are shown, for example, Shodfriars Quay and the railway swing bridge.

Notably, there is no scored music. Powell deliberately strove for "naturalism," relying on natural sounds that would be heard by the characters. The Dutch national anthem, Wilhelmus, is heard as part of the campaign of passive resistance by the population, and the film finishes with the coat of arms of the Netherlands on screen while the opening bars of the anthem are sung by a choir.

One of Our Aircraft Is Missing was cut by 20 minutes for its original American release.

The film was financed by British National, which had also financed Contraband by the same team.

== Reception ==
=== Box office ===
According to Kinematograph Weekly the film was one of the most popular at the British box office in 1942, after Mrs. Miniver, The First of the Few, How Green was My Valley, Reap the Wild Wind, Holiday Inn, Captains of the Clouds, and Sergeant York.

=== Awards ===
Michael Powell and Emeric Pressburger were nominated for the Academy Award for Best Writing, Original Screenplay, and Ronald Neame (photography) and C. C. Stevens (sound) for Best Effects, Special Effects. Powell's nomination was his only Academy Award nomination – Pressburger won an Academy Award for 49th Parallel and was nominated for The Red Shoes as well.

One of Our Aircraft Is Missing joins other British war films as one of the most "well-remembered, accomplished, and enjoyed" realist films of the period.

In 2014, One of Our Aircraft Is Missing was included in a set of war films packaged together and sold to raise funds for The Royal British Legion veterans organisation.

== In popular culture ==
One of Our Aircraft Is Missing is mentioned in the Dad's Army episode "The Lion Has Phones". When Lance-Corporal Jones tries to ring up GHQ, he mistakenly gets the cinema, whose operator tells him the film is on. There is a mention of Eric Portman and Googie Withers. A poster for the film is on display at the cinema. Correspondingly, in the episode of Dad's Army, "Time on My Hands", Pike knows how to open a parachute because, he says, he has seen it done in One of Our Aircraft Is Missing. The episode "Sons of the Sea" also contains numerous elements from this film.

In the James Bond film From Russia With Love, after dispatching an attack helicopter sent by SPECTRE, 007 quips, "I'd say one of their aircraft is missing." in a reference to One of Our Aircraft Is Missing.

The title is parodied by many other works:

- "One of Our Trunks Is Missing", a 1962 episode of The Adventures of Rocky and Bullwinkle and Friends
- "One of Our Engines Is Missing", a 1963 episode of McHale's Navy
- "One of Our Moose Is Missing", a 1964 episode of My Three Sons
- "One of Our Dogs Is Missing", a 1965 episode of Lost in Space
- "One of Our Assemblymen Is Missing", a 1966 episode of Green Acres
- One of Our Spies Is Missing, a 1966 film
- "One of Our Shells Is Missing", a 1967 episode of Gomer Pyle, U.S.M.C.
- "One of Our Olives Is Missing", a 1967 episode of Get Smart
- "One of Our Bottles Is Missing", a 1967 episode of I Dream of Jeannie
- "One of Our Chickens Is Missing", a 1969 episode of Petticoat Junction
- "One of Our Probes Is Missing", a 1972 episode of Search
- "One of Our Planets Is Missing", a 1973 episode of Star Trek: The Animated Series
- "One of Our Running Backs is Missing", a 1975 episode of The Six Million Dollar Man
- One of Our Dinosaurs Is Missing, a 1975 film in which Ustinov performed
- "One of Our Pylons Is Missing", a 1975 episode of Land of the Lost
- "One of Our Sweathogs Is Missing", a 1975 episode of Welcome Back, Kotter
- "One of Our Zeppelins Is Missing", a 1976 episode of Switch
- "Some of Our Coal Is Missing", a 1977 episode of Yanks Go Home
- "One of Our Chiefs Is Missing", a 1978 episode of Carter Country
- "One of Our Submarines", a 1982 Thomas Dolby song, which contains the lyric "One of our submarines is missing..."
- "One of Our Fruit Machines Is Missing", a 1986 Nik Kershaw song
- "One of Our Spiders Is Missing", a 2001 episode of Bill and Ben
- One of Our Thursdays Is Missing, a 2011 Jasper Fforde novel
- One of Our Jeans Is Missing, a 2016 Paul Charles novel
