= Arthur Lawson (designer) =

British art director (1908–1970)

- Born: 1908; Sunderland, County Durham, England
- Died: 1970 (aged 61–62)
- Occupation: Art director
- Years active: 1942–1969

Arthur Lawson (1908–1970) was a British art director. He had a long association with film directors Michael Powell and Emeric Pressburger, beginning in 1943 when he was floor manager on The Life and Death of Colonel Blimp. Three years later, when Powell and Pressburger, also known as The Archers, made A Matter of Life and Death (1946), Lawson had graduated to assistant art director.

He worked with Alfred Junge on the set decoration for Black Narcissus (1947), and won an Academy Award for Best Art Direction/Set Decoration for The Red Shoes (1948). Lawson's association with Powell continued until Peeping Tom (1960). He received a BAFTA nomination for The Bedford Incident (1965).

== Filmography ==
Year	Film	Director	Notes
1942	The Foreman Went to France	Charles Frend	
1943	The Life and Death of Colonel Blimp	Michael Powell and Emeric Pressburger	
1944	This Happy Breed	David Lean	
1944	The Way Ahead	Carol Reed	
1946	They Knew Mr. Knight	Norman Walker	
1946	A Matter of Life and Death	Michael Powell and Emeric Pressburger	
1947	Black Narcissus	Michael Powell and Emeric Pressburger	
1948	The Red Shoes	Michael Powell and Emeric Pressburger	Won an Academy Award for Best Art Direction/Set Decoration – Color; Shared with Hein Heckroth
1950	Gone to Earth	Michael Powell and Emeric Pressburger	
1950	The Elusive Pimpernel	Michael Powell and Emeric Pressburger	
1951	The Tales of Hoffmann	Michael Powell and Emeric Pressburger	
1952	Folly to Be Wise	Frank Launder	
1952	The Story of Robin Hood and His Merry Men	Ken Annakin	
1953	Twice Upon a Time	Emeric Pressburger	
1953	Front Page Story	Gordon Parry	
1954	The Constant Husband	Sidney Gilliat	
1955	Oh... Rosalinda!!	Michael Powell and Emeric Pressburger	
1955	Richard III	Laurence Olivier	
1956	The Battle of the River Plate	Michael Powell and Emeric Pressburger	
1956	Sea Wife	Bob McNaught	
1956	High Terrace	Henry Cass	
1957	Hour of Decision	C. M. Pennington-Richards	
1957	Seven Thunders	Hugo Fregonese	
1958	Harry Black	Hugo Fregonese	
1959	The Devils Disciple	Guy Hamilton	
1960	Sink the Bismarck	Lewis Gilbert	
1960	Peeping Tom	Michael Powell	
1961	The Valiant	Roy Ward Baker	
1962	The Very Edge	Cyril Frankel	
1962	The Brian	Freddie Francis	
1962	H.M.S. Defiant	Lewis Gilbert	
1963	The Leather Boys	Sidney J. Furie	
1965	The Bedford Incident	James B. Harris	Nominated for the BAFTA Award for Best British Art Direction – Black and White
1966	The Blue Max	John Guillermin	
1966	Bindle (One of Them Days)	Peter Saunders	
1967	The Double Man	Frank Schaeffer	
1968	The Lost Continent	Michael Carreras	
1969	Midas Run	Alf Kjellin	
