= The Volunteer (1944 film) =

- Trade advertisement
- Directed by: Michael Powell; Emeric Pressburger
- Written by: Michael Powell; Emeric Pressburger
- Produced by: Michael Powell; Emeric Pressburger
- Starring: Ralph Richardson; Pat McGrath
- Cinematography: Frederick Ford
- Edited by: John Seabourne; Michael C. Chorlton
- Music by: Allan Gray
- Release date: 10 January 1944
- Running time: 44:41 minutes
- Country: United Kingdom
- Language: English

The Volunteer (1944) is a short black-and-white British film directed, written and produced by Michael Powell and Emeric Pressburger and starring Ralph Richardson, Pat McGrath and Anna Neagle. It was produced for the British Ministry of Information during the Second World War, as recruitment propaganda for the Fleet Air Arm.

It was one of a highly regarded series of wartime collaborations between Powell and Pressburger, which also included The Life and Death of Colonel Blimp (1943) I Know Where I'm Going! (1945) and A Matter of Life and Death (1946).

== Synopsis ==
The film features Ralph Richardson starring in a West End production of Othello. Pat McGrath plays his dresser, who joins the Fleet Air Arm and becomes a war hero as famous as Richardson himself. Anna Neagle and Laurence Olivier make cameo appearances, as do the film's director, Michael Powell, and another British film director, Anthony Asquith.

== Cast ==
- Ralph Richardson as Lt Cmdr Ralph Richardson (himself)
- Pat McGrath as Fred Davey
- Anna Neagle as herself
- Laurence Olivier as himself
- Anthony Asquith as himself
- Michael Powell as himself

== Reception ==
The Monthly Film Bulletin wrote: "With touches of quiet charm, domesticity and romance, Powell and Pressburger have built this into a plausible real-life story told by Richardson. Ingenious devices – the aircraft carrier's own newsreel, for example – fill in the picture of life in the Fleet Air Arm from the earliest days of training, through shore and shipboard work and play at Alexandria and Algiers, and finally into exciting action against a flock of German planes."

Kine Weekly wrote: "Fiendly, unaffected Fleet Air Arm 'personal' documentary ... Technically it is perhaps a trifle fragmentary, but on the other hand it is refreshingly free from conscious and pretentious patriotism. In all, an engaging recruiting poster, and quota at that! ... The picture is inconsequential in its planning, but natural acting, and easy, friendly commentary, nevertheless give it an agreeable air of authenticity. It's good propaganda and even better entertainment."

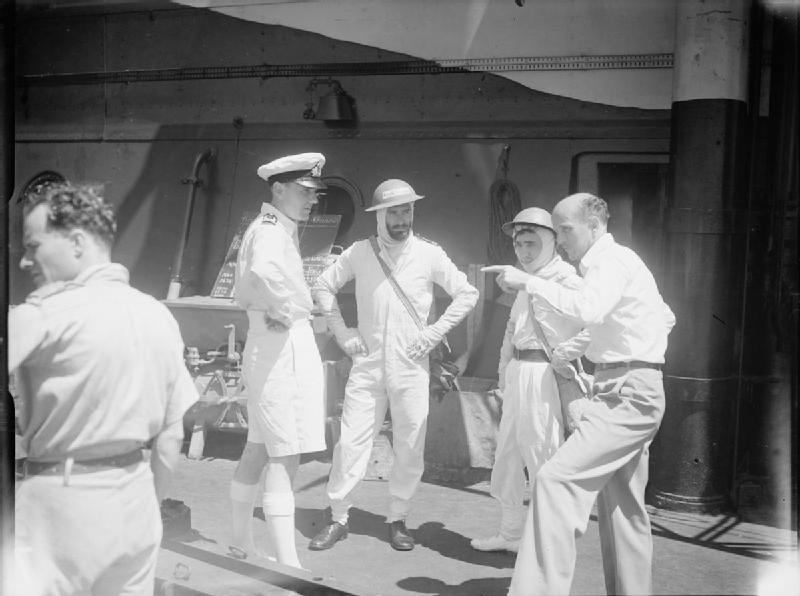
The director Michael Powell during filming for The Volunteer, 1943

== Home media ==
The film is available as a supplement to The Criterion Collection DVD of Powell and Pressburger's film 49th Parallel (1941), and on the BFI's blu-ray edition (2001) of Powell and Pressburger's film One of Our Aircraft is Missing (1942).
