= The End of the River =

- Original British quad poster
- Directed by: Derek Twist
- Screenplay by: Wolfgang Wilhelm
- Based on: the novel by Desmond Holdridge
- Produced by: Michael Powell and Emeric Pressburger
- Starring: Sabu; Bibi Ferreira; Esmond Knight; Robert Douglas; Orlando Martins
- Cinematography: Christopher G. Challis
- Edited by: Brereton Porter
- Music by: Lambert Williamson
- Production company: The Archers
- Distributed by: J. Arthur Rank; General Film Distributors; Independent Producers Limited
- Release date: 1 December 1947 (UK)
- Running time: 83 minutes
- Country: United Kingdom
- Language: English
- Budget: £217,400
- Box office: £139,400

The End of the River is a 1947 British drama film directed by Derek Twist and starring Sabu and Bibi Ferreira. It was written by Wolfgang Wilhelm, based on the 1940 novel Death of a Common Man by Desmond Holdridge, and produced by Powell and Pressburger as The Archers. Made in Brazil, the film concerns a Brazilian Indian boy who leaves the jungle for the city, where he is accused of murder.

== Cast ==
- Sabu as Manoel
- Bibi Ferreira as Teresa
- Esmond Knight as Dantos
- Robert Douglas as Jones
- Raymond Lovell as Porpino
- Torin Thatcher as Lisboa
- Antoinette Cellier as Conceicao
- Orlando Martins as Harrigan
- James Hayter as Chico

Uncredited

- Maurice Denham as defence counsel
- Alan Wheatley as Irgoyen
- Dennis Arundell as Coutinho
- Lucius Blake as shiphand
- Minto Cato as Dona Paula
- Arthur Goullet as the pedlar
- James Harcourt as the judge
- Charles Hawtrey as Raphael
- Peter Illing as ship's agent
- Zena Marshall as Santa
- Gibb McLaughlin as Mateo
- Russell Napier as the padre
- Bill Shine as Feliciano
- Milo Sperber as Ze

== Production ==
It was filmed mainly on location in Belém, Brazil, along the upper sections of the Amazon River, as well as at London's Pinewood Studios. Powell and Pressburger were unhappy with the film and requested Reggie Mills and Anne Coates re-edit it.

== Reception ==
=== Box office ===
The film earned £69,600 in producer's receipts in the UK and £69,800 overseas. According to Rank's own records the film had made a loss of £78,000 for the company by December 1949.

=== Critical ===
The Monthly Film Bulletin wrote: "This is an unusual production, but a monotonous series of flashbacks break the even development of the plot and it is difficult at times to keep track of the characters around whom the story is built. The result is that interest is lost and the film becomes boring. It is a pity, also, that so little use has been made of the South American river scenery. Bibi Ferreira gives character and charm to the role of Teresa and Sabu arouses sympathy for the bewildered boy Manoel."

Kine Weekly wrote: "Drab romantic melodrama, meandering alongside the mighty Amazon ... The picture unfolds in a series of sordid flashbacks and retrospective presentation makes its involved, scenically overloaded tale all the more difficult to follow. For a time its finely photographed vistas and panoramas thrill, but after that all attempts to wade through its grisly detail and interpret its message become an unutterable bore. It's entirely lacking in feminine appeal and the rudiments of popular entertainment. It's a case of the nuts going to Brazil."

The Radio Times described the film as "A curio," and concluded, "Despite a good cast and the Brazilian locations, the results are both confusing and disappointing."

TV Guide wrote: "A confusing, mediocre film shot in Brazil, with little to recommend it to audiences elsewhere."

Britmovie wrote, "Sabu is well suited for the role with his Indian good looks. He executes a credible performance... Bibi Ferreira is stunningly beautiful as his love interest... Esmond Knight, Orlando Martins, Robert Douglas, and Torin Thatcher all turn in solid performances... Even though parts of the story remain weak, the scenery definitely makes up for it. Christopher Challis is the cinematographer and he successfully portrays the life of the natives in the lush subtropical forests in Brazil."
