= C. C. Stevens =

British sound engineer

- Born: Charles Cyril Stevens; 31 March 1907; Andover, Hampshire, England
- Died: 13 July 1974 (aged 67); Sutton Green, Surrey, England
- Occupation: Sound engineer
- Years active: 1925-1946

Charles Cyril Stevens (31 March 1907 – 13 July 1974) was a British sound engineer. He was known for his work on the films of Powell and Pressburger, including A Matter Of Life And Death and I Know Where I'm Going. He was nominated for an Oscar for Best Special Effects for his work on the film One of Our Aircraft Is Missing. He worked on more than 80 films during his career.
