= Ian Christie (film scholar) =

British film scholar

Ian Christie FBA (born 1945) is a British film scholar. He has written several books including studies of the works of Michael Powell and Emeric Pressburger, Martin Scorsese and the development of cinema. He is a regular contributor to Sight & Sound magazine and a frequent broadcaster. Christie is Professor of Film and Media History at Birkbeck, University of London.

== Selected bibliography ==
- The Art of Film: John Box and Production Design (Wallflower, 2009) ISBN 978-1-905674-94-7
- A Matter of Life and Death (BFI, 2000) ISBN 978-0-85170-479-1
- Gilliam on Gilliam (Faber, 1999) [ed.]
- Scorsese on Scorsese (Faber and Faber, 1996 - revised edition) [ed. with David Thompson], 4th edition due in 2010.
- The Last Machine: Early Cinema and the Birth of the Modern World (BBC/BFI, 1994) ISBN 978-1-86000-094-2
- Arrows of Desire: the films of Michael Powell and Emeric Pressburger (Faber and Faber, 1994 – revised edition) ISBN 978-0-571-16271-0

== Audio commentaries ==
- A Canterbury Tale
- The Edge of the World, with comments from the director's widow, Thelma Schoonmaker-Powell, and actor Daniel Day-Lewis reading from Michael Powell's memoirs
- I Know Where I'm Going!
- A Matter of Life and Death
- Peeping Tom
- The Red Shoes, with actors Marius Goring and Moira Shearer, cinematographer Jack Cardiff, composer Brian Easdale, and filmmaker Martin Scorsese
- R.W. Paul: The Collected Films 1895–1908
- The Story of the Kelly Gang
- That Hamilton Woman
