= Michael Powell and Emeric Pressburger bibliography =

A list of books and essays about Powell & Pressburger:

- Christie, Ian (1994). Arrows of Desire: The Films of Michael Powell and Emeric Pressburger. Faber & Faber, Incorporated. ISBN 978-0-571-16271-0.
- Christie, Ian; Moor, Andrew (6 July 2005). Michael Powell: International Perspectives on an English Film-maker. British Film Institute. ISBN 978-1-84457-093-5.
- Friedman, Diane Broadbent; Powell, Michael; Pressburger, Emeric (2008). A Matter of Life and Death: The Brain Revealed by the Mind of Michael Powell. AuthorHouse. ISBN 978-1-4678-6802-0.
- Hockenhull, Stella (2008). Neo-romantic Landscapes: An Aesthetic Approach to the Films of Powell and Pressburger. Cambridge Scholars Publishing. ISBN 978-1847187444.
- Lazar, David (2003). Michael Powell: Interviews. Univ. Press of Mississippi. ISBN 978-1-57806-498-4.
- Moor, Andrew (8 January 2013). Powell and Pressburger: A Cinema of Magic Spaces. I.B.Tauris. ISBN 978-1-78076-377-4.
- Salwolke, Scott (1997). The Films of Michael Powell and the Archers. Scarecrow Press. ISBN 9780810831834.
