= Twice Upon a Time (1953 film) =

1953 film by Emeric Pressburger

- Theatrical release poster
- Directed by: Emeric Pressburger
- Written by: Emeric Pressburger; Wendy Orme
- Based on: Lottie and Lisa by Erich Kästner
- Produced by: Emeric Pressburger
- Starring: Hugh Williams; Elizabeth Allan; Jack Hawkins
- Cinematography: Christopher Challis
- Edited by: Reginald Beck
- Music by: Frederick Lewis
- Production company: London Films
- Distributed by: British Lion Films
- Release date: 6 July 1953
- Running time: 75 minutes
- Country: United Kingdom
- Language: English
- Budget: £102,000

Twice Upon a Time is a 1953 British comedy film directed by Emeric Pressburger and starring Hugh Williams, Elizabeth Allan and Jack Hawkins. It was written by Pressburger and Wendy Orme based on the 1949 novel Lisa and Lottie by Erich Kästner. It was shot at Shepperton Studios with sets designed by the art director Arthur Lawson.

Lotte and Lisa had already been adapted into the films Two Times Lotte (1950) and Hibari no komoriuta (1951). Twice Upon a Time was the first English-language film adaptation; the story was later twice adapted as The Parent Trap (1961 and 1998) and has been remade a number of times in English and other languages.

The film is the only solo directing credit for Pressburger, whose other directing credits are in association with Michael Powell.

== Plot ==
Twin sisters are separated when their parents divorce. They meet again by accident when they are sent to the same summer camp, and they hatch a plan to reunite their parents.

== Cast ==
- Hugh Williams as James Turner
- Elizabeth Allan as Carol-Anne Bailey
- Jack Hawkins as Dr. Mathews
- Yolande Larthe as Carol Turner
- Charmian Larthe as Anne Bailey
- Violette Elvin as Florence la Riche
- Isabel Dean as Miss Burke
- Michael Gough as Mr. Lloyd
- Walter Fitzgerald as Professor Reynolds
- Jeanne Stuart as Mrs. Jamieson
- Nora Gordon as Emma
- Martin Miller as Eipeldauer
- Lily Kann as Mrs. Eipeldauer
- Collin Wilcox as Ian
- Jack Lambert as Ernest
- Pat Baker as Sonia
- Isabel George as Molly
- Alanna Boyce as Susie
- Margaret McCourt as Wendy
- Myrette Morven as Miss Rupert
- Margaret Boyd as Mrs. Kinnaird
- Cicely Walper as Mrs. Maybridge
- Mollie Terraine as Miss Wellington
- Archie Duncan as doorman

== Reception ==
The Monthly Film Bulletin wrote: "This piece of whimsy suffers from generally lifeless direction, a pace unremittingly slow, and, apart from the performances of Jack Hawkins and Elizabeth Allan as the doctor and mother respectively, very indifferent acting. The whole picture is dressed up with expensive locations, including interior shots of Covent Garden, and an uninspired ballet sequence."

The Daily Film Renter wrote: "The production is geared by screenplay writer, producer and director Emeric Pressburger to appeal to just that vast section of the public which buys women's weeklies. It is polite and nothing heavy obtrudes. ... A woman's picture if ever there was one."
