= Ivor Beddoes =

English painter

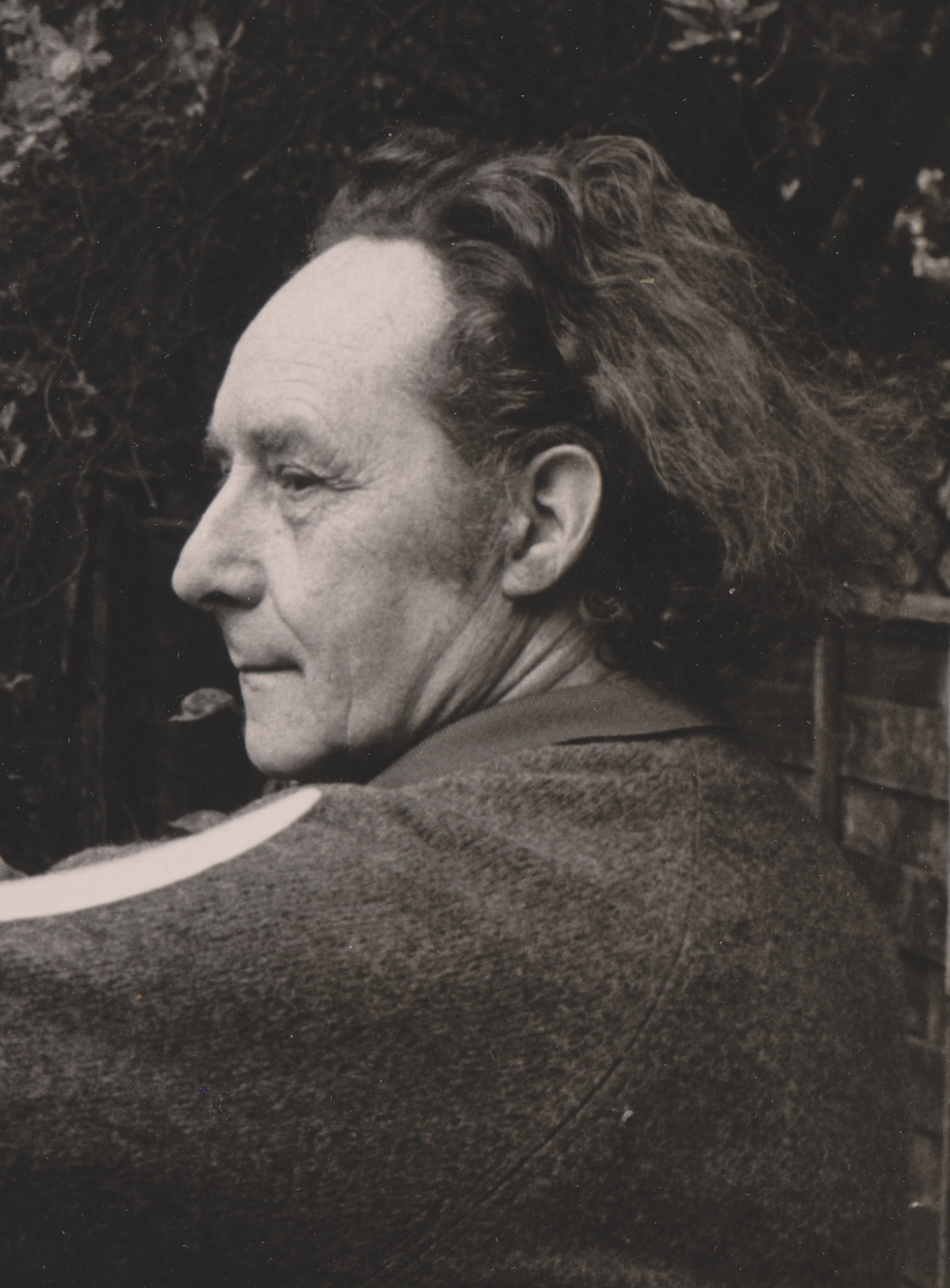
Beddoes in 1974

Ivor William Gilmour Beddoes (28 April 1909 – 14 March 1981) was a British matte painter, sketch and storyboard artist, costume and set designer, painter, dancer, composer and poet. He is best known for his film work, spanning more than thirty years, from Black Narcissus and The Red Shoes to Star Wars and Superman.

== Early life and education ==
Beddoes was born in Muswell Hill, North London, the eldest child of Rex and Helen (née Laird) Beddoes. As a child he studied the piano and joined in with his younger sister Gwen's dance classes. They performed song and dance acts at the frequent family musical evenings and later at local concert parties.

He attended Tollington School, at fifteen winning a scholarship to the Hampstead School of Art and at its closure after two years he was transferred to Hornsey College of Art. A few months after beginning his art study, Beddoes was invited by Horace (Hodge) Bryant to join his concert party, working at least two nights a week during the summer season and eventually performing on every bandstand in London. The money he earned from this enabled him to buy the art materials he needed to continue his study.

== Stage career ==
In 1927 Beddoes was spotted by Dick Tubb and gave up the idea of a career in art to tour as juvenile lead in The Bird's Nest. Having in his early teens taught himself to play the drums and read music, he also joined the orchestra to play jazz in the interval. In 1929 he became a drummer for the silent films until the talkies put him out of a job.

Although he still wanted to pursue an artistic career, with the financial crisis of that time it was almost impossible to find commercial art work. In 1930 he was hired for a summer seaside concert party and at the end of the season was taken by his agent to the Cone School of Dance who were looking for a male dancer to partner one of their students. So at the age of 21 he took his place in a class of young girl students to learn the elementary technique of barre and centre practice.

Beddoes worked as a chorus boy, tap dancer and singer in several revues until he was unexpectedly asked to join the Camargo Society who, at the time, were recruiting male dancers and was sent to Ninette de Valois who he partnered in one of her ballets Les Petits Riens as well as appearing in Rout, La création du monde and Job. He was subsequently invited to join the Vic-Wells Ballet, forerunner to the Royal Ballet, but had to decline the offer because he would not have been able to survive on the wages as he was hoping to get married. He went back to the commercial, musical side of theatre appearing in several shows including The Hour Glass, Helen, Bow Bells and The Golden Toy. During the tour of the latter show, Beddoes was asked, along with Jack Spurgeon, one of the other dancers, to learn the show's existing tumbling act in two weeks, which they did, painfully. At the end of the run they were booked to take the act to the Windmill Theatre for a three-week show.

Beddoes stayed at the Windmill for six years as a ballet dancer, character actor in the comedy sketches and singer/dancer in the musical ensemble scenes. Later he became choreographer for the ballets as well as set and costume designer, all while performing five shows a day. Through Mrs. Laura Henderson, Beddoes was introduced to John Ireland who accepted him as a pupil in harmony and counterpoint. He then began to compose and orchestrate his own music for the ballets and tableaux.

On 28 September 1940, at the end of six weeks of Production No.136, Beddoes walked off the stage for the last time. He became a stretcher bearer for the Ambulance Service in West Hampstead during the London Blitz and after a few months was conscripted into the British Army.

== Wartime ==
In early 1941 Beddoes sailed for the Middle East as a draughtsman for the Royal Signals Corps. He served in the Western Desert for 18 months until the retreat to El Alamein, he was then posted to Alexandria and later to Mersa Matruh. After an appeal was sent out for theatre professionals to join the Field Entertainment Unit, he was hired by Torin Thatcher and moved on to Cairo. There he produced plays, concert parties and revues and worked with the group until his demobilisation in January 1946.

During his five years in Egypt, Beddoes made extensive studies of Egyptian life, history, costume and music, learning Arabic by studying and mixing with the local Egyptian people. He also produced a huge number of sketchbooks and paintings, some of which are now owned by the Imperial War Museum, as well as writing several books of poetry.

== Film career ==
With no prospect of returning to his stage career, Beddoes tried unsuccessfully for any job that would take him back to Egypt so that he could continue his studying. Finally, through his brother-in-law John Cox who, from the Army Film Unit had taken over the sound department of Shepperton Studios, he gained a series of introductions to Art Directors. In Spring 1946 he met Alfred Junge, who, after seeing the work that he had produced in Egypt, took him on to learn to be a sketch artist. He started working on Black Narcissus immediately, learning on the job, which also included painting the Indian murals and designing the titles. At the end of this film he joined Hein Heckroth to work on The Red Shoes and they worked together for the next five years designing sets, costumes and titles.

Whilst working on The Red Shoes they came across a technical problem and Beddoes was sent to Technicolor, along with Józef Natanson, to learn matte painting with Duggie Hague, ('Poppa' Day's technical cameraman), instructing them. It was by trial and error that they learned the process of painting on glass. At one point Heckroth brought Michael Powell over to Technicolor to see the mattes that they were working on and from this meeting Beddoes was invited to become a permanent member of The Archers.

In 1952, when the slump in film making caused widespread unemployment, Technicolor invited him to join them as art director, matte painter and colour consultant. In 1956 Beddoes was sent to Bombay to open an art department at Technicolor/Ramnord to teach Indian film makers western methods, create a matte department and to lecture as required. He stayed for one year, training Indian painters and draughtsmen and working on the initial stages of Pakeezah.

On his return from India, Beddoes was loaned by Technicolor to Michael Powell to work in Madrid for almost a year onHoneymoon . He designed sets and all of the costumes for the ballets, El Amor Brujo and Los Amantes de Teruel, as well as painting the matte shots. He collaborated twice more with Michael Powell on projected films, Hassan in 1959 and The Tempest in 1973; neither of these films were made.

Beddoes left Technicolor in June 1959 when his department was closed down owing to the introduction of Eastmancolor and went on to work on more than fifty films. He assisted Ken Adam on several films including Goodbye Mr. Chips, Diamonds are Forever and Barry Lyndon as well as advising on and building stage models for The Girl of the Golden West (La fanciulla del West) staged at the Royal Opera House in 1977. He continued in the film industry until just before his death, working in his latter years on the Star Wars and Superman films.

== Personal life ==
Beddoes married Janet Challenger in 1933. They met while he was studying ballet at the Cone School of Dance in 1930 and she was his teacher. They lived in West Hampstead and had two children Martin (1940–2007) and Julia (born 1947). Throughout his life he painted, composed music, and wrote poetry and journals covering various aspects of his life, and he also cultivated an extensive wildlife garden. He was known as a skilled raconteur and continued performing comedy falls, and other tumbling routines for onlookers into his late sixties.

- Black Narcissus (1947) dir. Powell/Pressburger (scenic artist, uncredited)
- The Red Shoes (1948) dir. Powell/Pressburger (special painting, uncredited)
- The Small Back Room (1949) dir. Powell/Pressburger (assistant art director, uncredited)
- Gone to Earth (1950) dir. Powell/Pressburger (assistant art director)
- The Elusive Pimpernel (1950) dir. Powell/Pressburger (assistant designer)
- The Tales of Hoffmann (1951) dir. Powell/Pressburger (assistant designer)
- The Story of Robin Hood and His Merrie Men (1952) dir. Ken Annakin (sketch artist, uncredited)
- The Story of Gilbert and Sullivan (1953) dir. Sidney Gilliat (storyboards, uncredited)
- Moulin Rouge (1952) dir. John Huston (Technicolor colour consultant and special painting, uncredited)
- Mogambo (1953) dir. John Ford (Technicolor colour consultant, uncredited)
- Doctor in the House (1954) dir. Ralph Thomas (Technicolor colour consultant)
- Attila (1954) dir. Pietro Francisci (special effects)
- L'affaire des Poisons (1955) dir. Henri Decoin (Technicolor colour consultant, uncredited)
- It's a Wonderful World (1956) dir. Val Guest (sketch artist, uncredited)
- Seven Waves Away (1957) dir. Richard Sale (sketch artist, uncredited)
- Honeymoon (Luna de Miel) (1959) dir. Michael Powell (art director, costume design, matte artist)
- Gorgo (1961) dir. Eugene Lourie (sketch artist, uncredited)
- Invasion Quartet (1961) dir. Jay Lewis (sketch artist, uncredited)
- The Roman Spring of Mrs. Stone (1961) dir. Jose Quintero (sketch artist, uncredited)
- The Devil Never Sleeps (1962) dir. Leo McCarey (sketch artist, uncredited)
- Nine Hours to Rama (1963) dir. Mark Robson (sketch artist, set dresser, uncredited)
- The Haunting (1963) dir. Robert Wise (sketch artist)
- The V.I.P.s (1963) dir. Anthony Asquith (assistant art director, uncredited)
- First Men in the Moon (1964) dir. Nathan Duran (sketch artist, uncredited)
- The Long Ships (1964) dir. Jack Cardiff (matte artist)
- The Americanization of Emily (1964) dir. Arthur Hiller (assistant art director, sketch artist, uncredited)
- A Shot in the Dark (1964) dir. Blake Edwards (assistant art director – Paris location – sketch artist, uncredited)
- The Yellow Rolls-Royce (1964) dir. Anthony Asquith (sketch artist, uncredited)
- Murder Ahoy! (1964) dir. George Pollock (assistant art director on location in Cornwall and Gravesend, uncredited)
- Operation Crossbow (1965) dir. Michael Anderson (sketch artist, uncredited)
- Lady L (1965) dir. Peter Ustinov (assistant art director on location in Scarborough, uncredited)
- The Early Bird (1965) dir. Robert Asher (sketch artist, uncredited)
- Eye of the Devil (1966) dir. J. Lee Thompson (sketch artist, uncredited)
- Casino Royale (1967) dirs. Val Guest, Ken Hughes, John Huston, Joseph McGrath, Robert Parrish, Richard Talmadge (art director)
- The Mercenaries (1968) dir. Jack Cardiff (sketch artist, uncredited)
- The Dirty Dozen (1967) dir. Robert Aldrich (sketch artist, uncredited)
- Great Catherine (1968) dir. Gordon Flemyng (sketch artist, uncredited)
- Decline and Fall...of a Birdwatcher (1968) dir. John Krish (sketch artist, uncredited)
- Attack on the Iron Coast (1968) dir. Paul Wendkos (sketch artist, uncredited)
- Inspector Clouseau (1968) dir. Bud Yorkin (sketch artist, uncredited)
- Goodbye Mr. Chips (1969) dir. Herbert Ross (sketch artist, uncredited)
- The Private Life of Sherlock Holmes (1970) dir. Billy Wilder (sketch artist and projections, uncredited)
- Nicholas and Alexandra (1971) dir. Franklin J. Schnaffner (sketch artist, uncredited)
- Diamonds are Forever (1971) dir. Guy Hamilton (sketch artist, uncredited)
- Sleuth (1972) dir. Joseph L. Mankiewicz (sketch artist, model maker, uncredited)
- Barry Lyndon (1975) dir. Stanley Kubrick (illustrator, uncredited)
- The 7% Solution (1976) dir. Herbert Ross (sketch artist)
- Gulliver's Travels (1977) dir. Peter R. Hunt (sketch artist and titles)
- Star Wars (1977) dir. George Lucas (sketch artist, uncredited)
- The Spy Who Loved Me (1977) dir. Lewis Gilbert (sketch artist, uncredited)
- The Turning Point (1977) dir. Herbert Ross (sketch artist, uncredited)
- Superman (1978) dir. Richard Donner (illustrator)
- The Empire Strikes Back (1980) dir. Irvin Kershner (sketch artist)
- Superman II (1980) dir. Richard Lester (matte artist and illustrator)
