= Allan Gray (composer) =

Polish-British composer (1902–1973)

- Born: Józef Żmigrod; February 23, 1902; Tarnów, Austria-Hungary (now Poland)
- Died: September 10, 1973 (aged 71); Amersham, Buckinghamshire, England
- Era: 20th century

Józef Żmigrod (February 23, 1902 – September 10, 1973), better known by his stage name Allan Gray, was a Polish composer active in the UK film industry from the late 1930s until the mid 1950s.

== Early life and education ==
Gray was born Józef Żmigrod in Tarnów, Austria-Hungary, (present-day Poland) into a musical family: his father was a concert violinist. He studied philosophy in Heidelberg and later Berlin, where he composed a children's opera, Wavelength ABC. There (during the 1920s) he became a student of Arnold Schoenberg, funding himself by composing jazz-influenced music for the cabaret. He later wrote music for Max Reinhardt's theatre productions. As Schoenberg disapproved of such music, Żmigrod took up the stage name Allan Gray, naming himself after Oscar Wilde's Dorian Gray.

== Career ==
Gray began writing film scores in the Weimar Republic. His films there included Emil and the Detectives (1931) and The Countess of Monte Cristo (1932). But he was forced to leave the country in 1934 after the rise of Nazi Germany, moving to England. He married Luise Radermacher in Hendon in 1935 (thereafter known as Lissy Gray, and described as "a Belgian countess"), and the following year they settled in Amersham, Buckinghamshire, where they lived in Bois Lane. Like many of his fellow émigré composers he was arrested (on June 26 1940) as an “enemy alien” and taken to Liverpool, and from there interned on the Isle of Man. In October 1940, Ralph Vaughan Williams petitioned for Gray to be released as a musician of eminent distinction.

But by 1943 he had established himself in the British film industry, composing for London Films and other major studios before joining Powell and Pressburger to score many of their best-known Archers Film Unit productions, including The Life and Death of Colonel Blimp (1943), A Canterbury Tale (1944), I Know Where I'm Going! (1945) and A Matter of Life and Death (1946), the Prelude of which was recorded on a 78 disc and later reissued on EMI CD. 'Commando Patrol' from The Life and Death of Colonel Blimp ("a perfect illustration of the jazz idiom in background scoring") achieved popularity under its own right as recorded by The Squadronaires in 1943.

In 1951 he composed the score for the British–American adventure film The African Queen, directed by John Huston and produced by Sam Spiegel and John Woolf.

Gray also composed for theatre, television and radio, including the 1946 Stratford-on-Avon production of Love's Labour's Lost, and Much Ado About Nothing starring Robert Donat at the Aldwych Theatre, also in 1946. For television he contributed the music for 117 episodes of NBC's widely syndicated Douglas Fairbanks Jr. Presents in co-operation with Bretton Byrd. The series was filmed at the British National Studios in Elstree from 1953.

== Later life and death ==
Gray became a naturalized UK citizen on 29 January, 1947. He was friendly with another émigré musician, the conductor Walter Goehr, who conducted some of his film scores, and for a while taught his son, the composer Alexander Goehr. He died in Amersham on September 10, 1973.

== Film scores ==
- Berlin-Alexanderplatz (1931)
- Emil and the Detectives (1931)
- Man Without a Name (1932)
- The Countess of Monte Cristo (1932)
- F.P.1 (1933)
- The Burning Secret (1933)
- Mauvaise Graine (1934)
- Emil and the Detectives (1935 remake)
- The First Offence (1936)
- The Last Waltz (1936)
- The House of the Spaniard (1936)
- The Prisoner of Corbal (1936)
- Wolf's Clothing (1936)
- Secret of Stamboul (1936)
- School for Husbands (1937)
- The Challenge (1938)
- Kate Plus Ten (1938)
- There's No Tomorrow (1939)
- The Silver Fleet (1943)
- The Life and Death of Colonel Blimp (1943)
- The Volunteer (1943)
- A Canterbury Tale (1944)
- I Know Where I'm Going! (1945)
- Latin Quarter (1945)
- This Man Is Mine (1946)
- A Matter of Life and Death (1946)
- Mr. Perrin and Mr. Traill (1948)
- Madness of the Heart (1949)
- No Place for Jennifer (1950)
- The Reluctant Widow (1950)
- The Woman with No Name (1950)
- The Late Edwina Black (1951)
- The African Queen (1951)
- The Planter's Wife (1952)
- Women of Twilight (1952)
- Dangerous Voyage (1954)
- As Long as There Are Pretty Girls (1955)

== In popular culture ==
- Gray's "Swing Doors" is featured in the 2008 American video game Fallout 3.
- Gray's "Swing Doors" is featured in the documentary The Color of War, in episode "Victory in Europe".
- Gray's "Swing Doors" is featured in an episode of Father Knows Best.
