= Pamela Brown (actress) =

British actress (1917–1975)

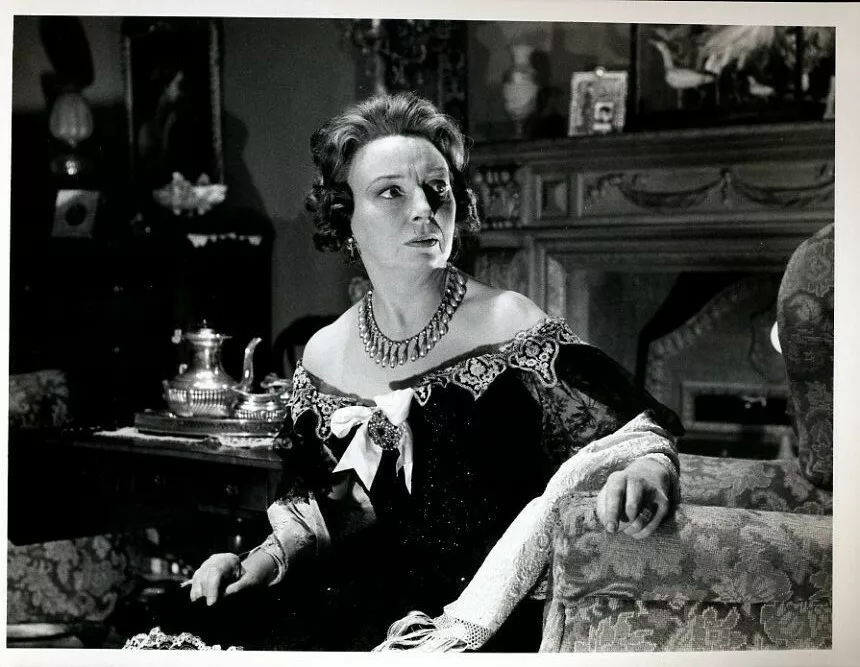
- Still of Brown from Bram Stoker's Dracula (1974)
- Born: Pamela Mary Brown; 8 July 1917; Hampstead, London, England
- Died: 19 September 1975 (aged 58); Avening, Gloucestershire, England
- Occupation: Actress
- Years active: 1942–1975
- Spouse: Peter Copley (m. 1941; div. 1953)
- Partner: Michael Powell (1962; died 1975)

Pamela Mary Brown (8 July 1917 – 19 September 1975) was a British actress. For her portrayal of Queen Victoria's mother Princess Victoria, Duchess of Kent in Victoria Regina (1961) she was awarded the Primetime Emmy Award for Outstanding Supporting Actress in a Drama Series.

== Early life ==
Brown was born in Hampstead, London, to George Edward Brown, a journalist, and his wife, Helen Blanche (née Ellerton). Growing up as a Roman Catholic, she attended St Mary's School, Ascot.

== Career ==
After attending the Royal Academy of Dramatic Art, Brown made her stage debut in 1936 as Juliet in a Stratford-upon-Avon production of Romeo and Juliet. Three of her early film roles were in Powell and Pressburger films: her first screen part in One of Our Aircraft Is Missing (1942), a memorable supporting role in I Know Where I'm Going! (1945), and in the fantasy film-opera The Tales of Hoffmann (1951). She played a bitter spinster in Personal Affair, starring Gene Tierney (1953).

From the early 1950s, Brown's arthritic condition (first appearing when she was sixteen) began to make playing on the stage difficult; her mobility was restricted and she was in great pain, which was kept at bay by drugs. Nevertheless, she was a notable success as Jennet in the London production of Christopher Fry's The Lady's Not For Burning, opposite Richard Burton, Claire Bloom and John Gielgud (1949), which transferred to Broadway for an extended run (1950–51). Time magazine wrote (20 November 1950): "As the lady, Pamela Brown proves that Fry did not write the part for her in vain. No one has a more gloriously uppity charm; no voice can simultaneously so rasp and thrill; no one ever made standoffishness more come-hitherable."

Brown's success in film continued as Jane Shore in Laurence Olivier's Richard III (1955) and opposite Kirk Douglas in the Van Gogh biopic Lust for Life (1956). Highlights of her 1960s work include the epic Cleopatra (High Priestess; 1963), Becket (Eleanor of Aquitaine; 1964) and A Funny Thing Happened on the Way to the Forum (High Priestess; 1966). Brown played Lady Bessborough in Lady Caroline Lamb (1972) and Archduchess Sophia of Austria in Fall of Eagles (1974).

== Personal life ==
In February 1953, Brown divorced her husband, Peter Copley, for infidelity. They had no children. A devout Roman Catholic, she could not remarry while Copley was still alive but chose to live with her partner Michael Powell, the director who had given her early film roles. They remained together until her death from pancreatic cancer in September 1975, aged 58, in Avening, Gloucestershire. Brown was buried in Holy Cross churchyard, Avening.

== Complete filmography ==
- One of Our Aircraft Is Missing (1942) as Els Meertens
- I Know Where I'm Going! (1945) as Catriona
- Death of a Rat (1946, TV movie) as Yolan
- Alice in Wonderland (1949) as The Queen of Hearts
- The Tales of Hoffmann (1951) as Nicklaus
- The Second Mrs. Tanqueray (1952) as Paula Tanqueray
- Personal Affair (1953) as Evelyn
- Baker's Dozen (1955, TV movie) as Mrs. Carewe
- Richard III (1955) as Jane Shore
- Now and Forever (1956) as Mrs. Grant
- Lust for Life (1956) as Christine
- Dark Possession (1959, TV movie) as Charlotte Bell Wheeler
- The Scapegoat (1959) as Blanche
- The House in Paris (1959, TV movie) as Naomi
- Victoria Regina (1961, TV movie) as Duchess of Kent
- Cleopatra (1963) as High Priestess
- Espionage (1963), episode "Never Turn Your Back on a Friend" as Miss. Jensen
- Becket (1964) as Eleanor of Aquitaine
- The Importance of Being Earnest (1964, Armchair Theatre TV movie) as Lady Bracknell
- The Witness (1966, TV movie) as Madame Pontreau
- A Funny Thing Happened on the Way to the Forum (1966) as High Priestess
- Half a Sixpence (1967) as Mrs. Washington
- The Admirable Crichton (1968, TV movie) as Lady Brocklehurst
- Secret Ceremony (1968) as Hilda
- On a Clear Day You Can See Forever (1970) as Mrs. Fitzherbert
- Figures in a Landscape (1970) as Widow
- Wuthering Heights (1970) as Mrs. Linton
- The Night Digger (1971) as Mrs. Edith Prince
- Lady Caroline Lamb or Peccato d'amore (1972) as Lady Bessborough
- Dracula (1974, TV movie) as Mrs. Westenra
- In This House of Brede (1975, TV movie) as Dame Agnes

== Sound recordings ==
Brown can be heard as Gwendolyn on the 1953 recording of The Importance of Being Earnest with John Gielgud and Edith Evans, as Cleopatra in the Caedmon Records production of Antony and Cleopatra, as Madame Irma in the Caedmon production of The Balcony, as Gertrude in Hamlet with Gielgud, and reading excerpts from Lady Chatterley's Lover.
