= King of the Damned =

- Theatrical_release_poster
- Directed by: Walter Forde
- Written by: Charles Bennett; Sidney Gilliat
- Based on: play by John Chancellor
- Produced by: Michael Balcon
- Cinematography: Bernard Knowles
- Edited by: Cyril Randell
- Music by: Jack Beaver; Louis Levy
- Production company: Gaumont British Picture Corporation
- Distributed by: Gaumont British Distributors
- Release date: 1935
- Running time: 81 minutes
- Country: United Kingdom
- Language: English

King of the Damned is a 1935 British prison film directed by Walter Forde and starring Conrad Veidt, Helen Vinson, Noah Beery and Cecil Ramage. It was written by Charles Bennett and Sidney Gilliat based on the play by John Chancellor.

== Plot summary ==
At a convict settlement in the Caribbean, the convicts suffer under a new commandant, who sends them to do road work. The convicts, led by Convict 83, lead a revolt. Convict 83 falls for the commandant's daughter, Anna. The commandant dies in the fight. Anna escapes and sends a message to a warship which arrives at the settlement. Anna returns with Convict 83 to see that he gets a fair trial.

== Cast ==
- Conrad Veidt as Convict 83
- Helen Vinson as Anna Fernandez
- Noah Beery as Convict 98
- Cecil Ramage as Major Montez
- Edmund Willard as The Greek
- Percy Parsons as lumberjack
- Peter Croft as Boy convict
- Raymond Lovell as Captain Torres
- C. M. Hallard as Commandant
- Allan Jeayes as Doctor Prada
- Percy Walsh as Captain Perez
- Gibson Gowland as priest
- Lucius Blake

== Production ==
Film rights to the original play were bought by Gaumont British who converted it into a vehicle for Conrad Veidt. Filming took place in July 1935.

To avoid French protests on films depicting Devil's Island, the producers gave all locations Spanish names and set the film in the Caribbean. Variety reported in its review of the film that it was "difficult to locale the settlement. It is somewhere in the Caribbean. The officers have Spanish names and the garrote is used at executions, but most of the officers and practically all of the convicts speak with a pronounced British accent... It makes for a rather polyglot affair." Nonetheless, the film was banned in France.

== Reception ==
The Monthly Film Bulletin wrote: "The story's chief failing is its vague and muddled background: although the name of the island is Santa Maria and the Sub-Commandant's name is Ramon, the atmosphere is unmistakably English, and more than one of the convicts is blessed with a public-school accent. The moral issue has been highly simplified, and, given the scantiest of details, all we know is that the convicts are 'the good ones' and the officers 'the bad ones.' The film is not made more convincing by the addition of a feeble and wordy love-interest without any sort of realistic basis. ... The conclusion is also vague and unsatisfactory."

The Daily Film Renter wrote: "Settings admirably achieve requisite atmosphere, while large crowds have been effectively handled. Conrad Veidt excellent as leader of revolt, with Helen Vinson supplying feminine interest, and Noah Beery in form as brutal prisoner. First rate entertainment and box-office, with big popular angles all over it."

Variety wrote that Veidt "excellent actor though he is, he is miscast in this role of the convict leader. He is seldom convincing, and rarely dominant. Beery takes the honors away from him because of a more vibrant personality and the fact that he gets what little comedy there is."
