= Lucius Blake =

Jamaica-born British actor

Lucius Blake, born Elusha Ebenezer Blake, was a Jamaica-born actor who appeared in more than 30 British films. The Guardian describes him as "possibly the most prolific black actor in early British cinema."

== Life ==
Blake was born in Jamaica and initially worked with his family planting coffee. He moved to Pittsburgh when he was 23, where he had jobs as a chauffeur, janitor, and mechanic, among others. In the 1920s, he moved to the UK, where he began his film career. His first known film role was in the 1928 Sweeney Todd, followed by seaman Sam in The American Prisoner in 1929. He appeared in more than 30 British films, including a key part alongside Conrad Veidt in King of the Damned (1935). He was sometimes credited as J. Blake or Sam Blake. During his time in the UK there was an attempt on his life, but it is unknown when or by whom. He also served as a stretcher-bearer in the London blitz. His last known film appearance was an uncredited role as a witch doctor in Old Mother Riley's Jungle Treasure.

== Selected filmography ==
Year	Title	Role	Notes	Ref(s)
1928	Sweeney Todd	Sambo	Credited as J. Blake	
1929	The American Prisoner	Cuffee/Sam/Snowball	First credited	
1935	King of the Damned	Sam/convict 7011	Uncredited	
1935	McGlusky the Sea Rover	Sunshine		
1935	The Mystery of the Mary Celeste		Uncredited	
1938	Old Bones of the River	Sergeant Abiboo	Uncredited	
1944	Dreaming	African Prince		
1946	Men of Two Worlds	Rafi, the Chief		
1947	The End of the River	Stevedore (dockworker)	Uncredited	
1951	Cry, the Beloved Country	Extra in public gallery	Uncredited	
1951	Old Mother Riley's Jungle Treasure	Witch doctor	Final film, uncredited	
