= The Life and Death of Colonel Blimp =

1943 film by Pressburger and Powell

- Cinema poster
- Directed by: Michael Powell; Emeric Pressburger
- Written by: Michael Powell; Emeric Pressburger
- Produced by: Michael Powell; Emeric Pressburger
- Starring: Anton Walbrook; Deborah Kerr; Roger Livesey
- Cinematography: Georges Perinal
- Edited by: John Seabourne Sr.
- Music by: Allan Gray
- Production company: The Archers
- Distributed by: General Film Distributors
- Release date: 10 June 1943
- Running time: 163 minutes
- Country: United Kingdom
- Language: English
- Budget: £200,000 or US$2 million or £188,812
- Box office: $275,472 (US)

The Life and Death of Colonel Blimp is a 1943 British romantic-war film written, produced and directed by the British film-making team of Michael Powell and Emeric Pressburger. It stars Roger Livesey, Deborah Kerr and Anton Walbrook. The title derives from the satirical Colonel Blimp comic strip by David Low, but the story is original. Although the film is strongly pro-British, it is a satire on the British Army, especially its leadership. It suggests that Britain faced the option of following traditional notions of honourable warfare or "fighting dirty" against such an evil enemy as Nazi Germany.

One film critic has described this film as "England's greatest film ever" and it is renowned for its sophistication and directorial brilliance as well as for its script. The performances of its large cast and its pioneering Technicolor cinematography are also praised. Among its distinguished company of actors, particular praise has been reserved for Livesey, Walbrook and Kerr.

The film was ranked 45th in the British Film Institute's 1999 list of the top 100 British films and 80th in Empire magazine's list of the 500 Greatest Movies of All Time.

== Plot ==
Major-General Clive Wynne-Candy is a senior commander in the British Home Guard during World War II. Before a training exercise, he is "captured" in a Victorian Turkish bath by British Army troops led by Lieutenant "Spud" Wilson, who has struck pre-emptively. He ignores Clive's outraged protests that "War starts at midnight!" They scuffle and fall into the plunge pool. An extended flashback ensues.

In 1902, Clive is on leave from the Second Boer War, where his service has earned him the Victoria Cross. He receives a letter from Edith Hunter, a stranger to him, who is working in Berlin. Edith complains that a German man named Kaunitz is spreading anti-British propaganda regarding Britain's role in the conflict, and wants the British embassy to intervene. When Clive brings this to his superiors' attention, they refuse him permission to go to Berlin, but he goes anyway. In Berlin, Clive and Edith go to a café, where he confronts Kaunitz. Provoked, Clive inadvertently insults the Imperial German Army's officer corps. The Germans insist he fight a duel with an officer chosen by drawing lots, which ends up being Theo Kretschmar-Schuldorff. In the duel, both Clive and Theo suffer injuries, but become friends while recuperating. Edith visits the duo regularly and, although she has feelings for Clive, becomes engaged to Theo. Clive is delighted, but soon realises that he also loves her. Upon returning home, Clive takes Edith's sister Martha to the opera, which does not result in a relationship.

In November 1918, Clive, now at the rank of brigadier general, believes the Allies will win World War I because "right is might". While in France, Clive meets nurse Barbara Wynne, who bears a striking resemblance to Edith. He courts and marries her despite their 20-year age difference, while his army driver Murdoch becomes their butler. In July 1919, Clive tracks Theo down at a British prisoner-of-war camp in Derbyshire. Clive greets him as if nothing has changed, but Theo snubs him. On 26 August, about to be repatriated to Germany, Theo apologises and accepts an invitation to Clive's house. He remains sceptical that his country will be treated fairly by the Allies. Barbara dies in August 1926, and Clive retires from the Army in 1935.

In November 1939, Theo relates to a British immigration official how he was estranged from his children when they became Nazis. Before World War II, he refused to move to England when Edith wanted; by the time he was ready, she had died. Clive vouches for Theo, and reveals to him that he loved Edith and only realised it after it was too late. Theo meets Angela "Johnny" Cannon, who is Clive's MTC driver; Theo is struck by her resemblance to Barbara and Edith. Clive, restored to the active list as a major-general, is to give a BBC radio talk regarding the retreat from Dunkirk. Clive plans to say he would rather lose the war than win it using the methods employed by the Nazis, but his talk is cancelled. Theo urges Clive to accept the need to fight and win by whatever means are necessary because the consequences of losing are so dire.

Clive again is retired, but, at Theo's and Angela's urging, turns his energy to the Home Guard, and his efforts in building this organisation win him national press attention. (Note: In a magazine article shown on the screen, his Home Guard rank is given as Zone Commander, equivalent to a British Army brigadier. However, he is shown wearing the insignia of a colonel.) His house is bombed in the Blitz, killing Murdoch, and it is replaced by an emergency water supply cistern. Clive moves to his club, where he relaxes in a Turkish bath before a training exercise he has arranged. Wilson is revealed as Angela's boyfriend, who used her to learn about Clive's plans and location. She tries to warn Clive, but it is too late. Theo and Angela find Clive sitting across the street from where his house stood. He recalls that after being dressed down by his superior for causing the diplomatic incident, he declined the man's invitation to dinner, and often regretted doing so. He tells Angela to invite her boyfriend to dine with him. Years before, Clive promised Barbara that he would "never change" until his house was flooded and "this is a lake". Seeing the cistern, he realises that "here is the lake and I still haven't changed". Clive salutes the new guard as it passes by him.

== Cast ==
- Roger Livesey as Clive Wynne-Candy
- Deborah Kerr as Edith Hunter / Barbara Wynne / Angela "Johnny" Cannon
- Anton Walbrook as Theo Kretschmar-Schuldorff
- Ursula Jeans as Frau von Kalteneck
- James McKechnie as Spud Wilson
- David Hutcheson as Hoppy
- Frith Banbury as David "Baby-Face" Fitzroy
- Muriel Aked as Aunt Margaret
- John Laurie as Murdoch
- Neville Mapp as Stuffy Graves
- Vincent Holman as Club porter (1942)
- Spencer Trevor as Period Blimp
- Roland Culver as Colonel Betteridge
- James Knight as Club porter (1902)
- Dennis Arundell as Café orchestra leader
- David Ward as Kaunitz
- Valentine Dyall as von Schönborn
- A. E. Matthews as President of Tribunal
- Carl Jaffe as von Reumann
- Albert Lieven as von Ritter
- Eric Maturin as Colonel Goodhead
- Robert Harris as Embassy Secretary
- Arthur Wontner as Embassy Counsellor
- Theodore Zichy as Colonel Borg
- Jane Millican as Nurse Erna
- Reginald Tate as van Zijl
- Captain W. Barrett as The Texan
- Corporal Thomas Palmer as The Sergeant
- Yvonne Andre as The Nun
- Marjorie Gresley as The Matron
- Felix Aylmer as The Bishop
- Helen Debroy as Mrs. Wynne
- Norman Pierce as Christopher Wynne, his father-in-law
- Harry Welchman as Major Davies
- Edward Cooper as BBC Official
- Ian Fleming as Major Plumley

Cast notes:

- Making their second appearance in The Life and Death of Colonel Blimp were director Michael Powell's golden Cocker Spaniels, Erik and Spangle, who had appeared in Contraband (1940), and were seen in the Powell and Pressburger films I Know Where I'm Going! (1945) and A Matter of Life and Death (US: Stairway to Heaven, 1946).

== Production ==
=== Development ===
According to the directors, the idea for the film did not come from the newspaper comic strip by David Low but from a scene cut from their previous film One of Our Aircraft Is Missing (1942), in which an elderly member of the crew tells a younger one: "You don't know what it's like to be old." Powell has stated that the idea was suggested by David Lean (then a film editor) who, when removing the scene from the film, mentioned that the premise of the conversation was worthy of a film.

Prompted by objections from James Grigg, Secretary of State for War, prime Minister Winston Churchill, wrote to Brendan Bracken, the Minister of Information: "Pray propose to me the measures necessary to stop this foolish production before it gets any further." Grigg warned that the public's belief in the "Blimp conception of the Army officer" would be given "a new lease of life". There is also a certain similarity between Candy and Churchill, and some historians have suggested that Churchill may have mistaken the film for a parody of himself (having also served in the Boer War and the First World War). His exact reasons remain unclear, but he was acting only on a description of the planned film from his staff, not on a viewing of the film itself.

Bracken was uncomfortable with Churchill's request, and replied he had no power to do so. After Ministry of Information and War Office officials had viewed a rough cut, objections were withdrawn in May 1943. However, Churchill's disapproval remained and at his insistence an export ban, much exploited in advertising by the British distributors remained in place until August 1943. In an interview for a 1971 booklet, Powell revealed that he wanted to portray Blimp as "a symbol of British procrastination and British regard for tradition and all the things which we know are losing the war".

=== Casting ===
Powell wanted Laurence Olivier (who had appeared in Powell and Pressburger's 49th Parallel and The Volunteer) to play Candy. However, the Ministry of Information refused to release Olivier—who was serving in the Fleet Air Arm—from active service, telling Powell and Pressburger "we advise you not to make it and you can't have Laurence Olivier because he's in the Fleet Air Arm and we're not going to release him to play your Colonel Blimp".

Powell wanted Wendy Hiller to play Kerr's parts but she withdrew due to pregnancy.

Frau von Kalteneck, a friend of Theo Kretschmar-Schuldorff, was played by Roger Livesey's wife Ursula Jeans. Although they often appeared on stage together, this was their only appearance together in a film.

=== Filming ===
The film was shot in four months at Denham Film Studios and on location in and around London. Exteriors included The Bull Hotel, Oxford Road, at Gerrards Cross (Spud's rendezvous with Angela), 15 Ovington Square, Kensington (Aunt Margaret's, and later, Clive and Barbara's house), and 139 Park Lane, Mayfair (Home Guard Headquarters). The (Wynne family home) was filmed at Denton Hall in Yorkshire. Filming was made difficult by the wartime shortages and by Churchill's objections leading to a ban on the production crew having access to any military personnel or equipment. But they still managed to "find" quite a few Army vehicles and plenty of uniforms.

Michael Powell said of The Life and Death of Colonel Blimp that it is

... a 100% British film but it's photographed by a Frenchman, it's written by a Hungarian, the musical score is by a German Jew, the director was English, the man who did the costumes was a Czech; in other words, it was the kind of film that I've always worked on with a mixed crew of every nationality, no frontiers of any kind.

At other times he also pointed out that the designer was German, and the leads included Austrian and Scottish actors.

The military adviser for the film was Lieutenant General Douglas Brownrigg (1886–1946), whose own career was rather similar to Wynne-Candy's, as he had served with distinction in the First World War, was retired after the Dunkirk evacuation, and then took a senior role in the Home Guard.

== Music ==
For the music, recorded by music director Charles Williams, Allan Gray used some existing pieces (Mendelssohn, Offenbach, Wagner), while composing new music to illustrate Britain's gradual change in attitude to war from the days of the Boer War onwards. These include 'I see you everywhere' (a foxtrot), 'The mill goes round and around' (a waltz), and 'Colonel Blimp March'. John Huntley highlights the use of jazz as background scoring for the sequence depicting a Home Guard operation in progress, during which 'Colonel Blimp' is captured while in a Turkish bath. As 'Commando Patrol' this piece achieved popularity under its own right, recorded by The Squadronaires in 1943.

== Reception ==
The film was released in the UK in 1943. The première, organised by Lady Margaret Alexander, took place on 10 June at the Odeon Leicester Square, London, with all proceeds donated to the Odeon Services and Seamen's Fund. The film was heavily attacked on release mainly because of its sympathetic presentation of a German officer, albeit an anti-Nazi one, who is more down-to-earth and realistic than the central British character. Sympathetic German characters had appeared in the films of Powell and Pressburger, for example The Spy in Black and 49th Parallel, the latter of which was made during the war.

The film provoked the extremist pamphlet "The Shame and Disgrace of Colonel Blimp" by "right-wing sociologists E.W. and M.M. Robson", members of the obscure Sidneyan Society, which proclaimed it a "highly elaborate, flashy, flabby and costly film, the most disgraceful production that has ever emanated from a British film studio."

The film was the third most popular movie at the British box office in 1943, after In Which We Serve and Casablanca.

Due to the British government's disapproval of the film, it was not released in the United States until 1945 and then in a modified form, in black and white as The Adventures of Colonel Blimp or simply Colonel Blimp. The original cut was 163 minutes. It was reduced to a 150-minute version, then later to 90 minutes for television, both in black and white. One of the crucial changes made to the shortened versions was the removal of the film's flashback structure.

== Restorations ==
In 1983, the original cut was restored for a re-release, much to Emeric Pressburger's delight. Pressburger, as affirmed by his grandson Kevin Macdonald on a Carlton Region 2 DVD featurette, considered Blimp the best of his and Powell's works.

Nearly 30 years later, The Life and Death of Colonel Blimp underwent another restoration similar to that performed on The Red Shoes. The fundraising was spearheaded by Martin Scorsese and Thelma Schoonmaker, Scorsese's long-time editor and Michael Powell's widow. Restoration work was completed by the Academy Film Archive in association with the BFI, ITV Studios Global Entertainment Ltd. (the current copyright holders), and The Film Foundation, with funding provided by The Material World Charitable Foundation, the Louis B. Mayer Foundation, Cinema per Roma Foundation, and The Film Foundation.

== Legacy ==
Since the highly successful re-release of the film in the 1980s, The Life and Death of Colonel Blimp has been re-evaluated. The film is praised for its dazzling Technicolor cinematography, the performances by the lead actors as well as for transforming, in Roger Ebert's words, "a blustering, pigheaded caricature into one of the most loved of all movie characters". David Mamet has written: "My idea of perfection is Roger Livesey (my favorite actor) in The Life and Death of Colonel Blimp (my favorite film) about to fight Anton Walbrook (my other favorite actor)." Stephen Fry saw the film as addressing "what it means to be English", and praised it for the bravery of taking a "longer view of history" in 1943. Anthony Lane of The New Yorker wrote in 1995 that the film "may be the greatest English film ever made, not least because it looks so closely at the incurable condition of being English".
