= Powell and Pressburger =

British filmmaking duo

Powell and Pressburger The Archers
- Industry: Film production company
- Founded: 1939; 1943 (as "The Archers")
- Defunct: 1957
- Fate: Partnership amicably ended
- Headquarters: United Kingdom
- Key people: Michael Powell; Emeric Pressburger
- Products: The Spy in Black (1939); Contraband (1940); 49th Parallel (1941); One of Our Aircraft Is Missing (1942); The Life and Death of Colonel Blimp (1943); A Canterbury Tale (1944); I Know Where I'm Going! (1945); A Matter of Life and Death (1946); Black Narcissus (1947); The Red Shoes (1948); The Small Back Room (1949); Gone to Earth (1950); The Elusive Pimpernel (1950); The Tales of Hoffmann (1951); Oh... Rosalinda!! (1955); The Battle of the River Plate (1956); Ill Met by Moonlight (1957)

The British film-making partnership of Michael Powell (1905–1990) and Emeric Pressburger (1902–1988)—together often known as The Archers, the name of their production company—made a series of influential films in the 1940s and 1950s. Their collaborations—24 films between 1939 and 1972—were mainly derived from original stories by Pressburger with the script written by both Pressburger and Powell. Powell did most of the directing while Pressburger did most of the work of the producer and also assisted with the editing, especially the way the music was used. Unusually, the pair shared a writer-director-producer credit for most of their films. The best-known of these are The Life and Death of Colonel Blimp (1943), A Canterbury Tale (1944), I Know Where I'm Going! (1945), A Matter of Life and Death (1946), Black Narcissus (1947), The Red Shoes (1948), and The Tales of Hoffmann (1951).

In 1981, Powell and Pressburger were recognised for their contributions to British cinema with the BAFTA Academy Fellowship Award, the most prestigious award given by the British Academy of Film and Television Arts.

== History ==
=== Early films ===
Powell was already an experienced director, having worked his way up from making silent films to the First World War drama The Spy in Black (1939), his first film for Hungarian émigré producer Alexander Korda. Pressburger, who had come from Hungary in 1935, already worked for Korda, and was asked to do some rewrites for the film. This collaboration was the first of 19, most over the next 18 years.

After Powell had made two further films for Korda, he reunited with Pressburger in 1940 for Contraband, the first in a run of Powell and Pressburger films set during the Second World War. The second was 49th Parallel (1941), which won Pressburger an Academy Award for Best Story. Both are Hitchcock-like thrillers made as anti-Nazi propaganda. For these three films, Powell is the credited director (also producer on 49th Parallel), while Pressburger is credited with the screenplay:

- The Spy in Black (1939)
- Contraband (1940)
- 49th Parallel (1941)

=== Birth of The Archers ===
The pair adopted a joint writer-producer-director credit for their next film, One of Our Aircraft Is Missing (1942) and made reference to "The Archers" in the credits. In 1943 they incorporated their own production company, Archers Film Productions, and adopted a distinctive archery target logo which began each film. The joint credit "Written, Produced and Directed by Michael Powell and Emeric Pressburger" indicates their joint responsibility for their own work and that they weren't beholden to any studio or other producers.

In a letter to Wendy Hiller in 1942, asking her to appear in Colonel Blimp, Pressburger explicitly set out 'The Archers' Manifesto'. Its five points express the pair's intentions:

1. We owe allegiance to nobody except the financial interests which provide our money; and, to them, the sole responsibility of ensuring them a profit, not a loss.
2. Every single foot in our films is our own responsibility and nobody else's. We refuse to be guided or coerced by any influence but our own judgement.
3. When we start work on a new idea, we must be a year ahead, not only of our competitors, but also of the times. A real film, from idea to universal release, takes a year. Or more.
4. No artist believes in escapism. And we secretly believe that no audience does. We have proved, at any rate, that they will pay to see the truth, for other reasons than her nakedness.
5. At any time, and particularly at the present, the self-respect of all collaborators, from star to propman, is sustained, or diminished, by the theme and purpose of the film they are working on.

They began to form a group of regular cast and crew members who worked with them on many films over the next 12 years. Hardly any of these people were ever under contract to The Archers—they were hired film by film—but Powell and Pressburger soon learnt whom they worked well with and who enjoyed working with them. When Raymond Massey was offered the part of the Prosecuting Attorney in A Matter of Life and Death his cabled reply was "For The Archers anytime, this world or the next."

Powell and Pressburger also co-produced a few films by other directors under The Archers' banner: The Silver Fleet (1943), written and directed by Vernon Sewell and Gordon Wellesley, based on a story by Pressburger, and The End of the River (1947), directed by Derek N. Twist, to which both Powell and Pressburger contributed uncredited writing. Both Sewell and Twist had worked with Powell & Pressburger previously on other films and were being given their first chance as directors.

Over the course of the war and afterwards, they released a series of acclaimed films:

- One of Our Aircraft Is Missing (1942)
- The Life and Death of Colonel Blimp (1943)
- The Silver Fleet (1943) (producers only; written and directed by the team of Vernon Sewell and Gordon Wellesley)
- The Volunteer (1944) a short propaganda film
- A Canterbury Tale (1944)
- I Know Where I'm Going! (1945)
- A Matter of Life and Death (1946)

=== The collaboration ===
He knows what I am going to say even before I say it—maybe even before I have thought it—and that is very rare. You are lucky if you meet someone like that once in your life.

— Pressburger on Powell,

Generally, Pressburger created the original story (for all their films from 1940–1946) and wrote the first draft of the script. They then passed the script back and forth a few times—they could never work on it together in the same room. For the dialogue, Pressburger knew what he wanted the characters to say but Powell would often supply some of the actual words.

They both acted as producers, perhaps Pressburger slightly more than Powell, since he could soothe the feathers ruffled by Powell's forthright manner. They became their own producers mainly to stop anyone else from interfering, since they had a considerable degree of freedom, especially under Rank, to make just about any film they wanted.

The direction was nearly all done by Powell, but even so The Archers generally worked as a team, with the cast and crew often making suggestions. Pressburger was always on hand, usually on the studio floor, to make sure that these late changes fit seamlessly into the story.

Once the filming was finished, Powell usually went off for a walk in the hills of Scotland to clear his head, but Pressburger was often closely involved in the editing, especially in the way the music was used. Pressburger was a musician himself and had played the violin in an orchestra in Hungary.

He'd stood the story on its head, he'd turned a man into a woman and a woman into a man, he'd altered the suspense, he'd rewritten the end... I was rejoicing that I was going to be working with someone like this.

— Powell on first meeting Pressburger,

When the film was finally ready and Powell was back from the Highlands, he was usually "the front man" in any promotional work, such as interviews for the trade papers or fan magazines.

Because collaborative efforts such as Powell and Pressburger's were, and continue to be, unusual in the film industry, and because of the influence of the auteur theory, which elevates the director as a film's primary creator, Pressburger has sometimes been dismissed as "Michael Powell's scriptwriter". Powell himself consistently, emphatically and categorically rejected this characterization, and was the first to say, in many interviews, that he couldn't have done most of what he did without Pressburger working as a full and equal film-making partner.

=== Post-war success and decline ===
- Black Narcissus (1947)
- The End of the River (1947) (producers only; written by Wolfgang Wilhelm, directed by Derek Twist)
- The Red Shoes (1948)
- The Small Back Room (1949)
- Gone to Earth (1950). A substantially re-edited version was released in the US as The Wild Heart (1952) by co-producer David O. Selznick, after a court battle with Powell and Pressburger. The film was fully restored by the British Film Archive in 1985.
- The Elusive Pimpernel (1950)
- The Tales of Hoffmann (1951)

=== End of the partnership ===
After the early 1950s, Powell and Pressburger began to produce fewer films. Their last two films were financially successful, but the duo's mid-1950s output met with less critical success than their earlier films. Powell himself felt that Ill Met by Moonlight was The Archers' worst film.

- Oh... Rosalinda!! (1955)
- The Battle of the River Plate (1956)
- Ill Met by Moonlight (1957)

The Archers' productions officially came to an end in 1957, and the pair separated to pursue their individual careers. The separation was amicable, and they remained devoted friends for the rest of their lives.

=== Later collaboration ===
The pair reunited for two films:

- They're a Weird Mob (1966)
- The Boy Who Turned Yellow (1972)

For both these films, Powell was credited as the sole director, and Pressburger as the sole screenwriter (for They're a Weird Mob, Pressburger used the pseudonym "Richard Imrie"). Powell produced They're a Weird Mob, Pressburger produced The Boy Who Turned Yellow.

== Regular cast and crew ==
Powell and Pressburger re-used actors and crew members in a number of films. Actors who were part of The Archers' "stock company" include:

- Pamela Brown (One of Our Aircraft Is Missing, I Know Where I'm Going!, The Tales of Hoffmann)
- Kathleen Byron (The Silver Fleet, A Matter of Life and Death, Black Narcissus, The Small Back Room)
- Robert Coote (A Matter of Life and Death, The Elusive Pimpernel)
- Finlay Currie (49th Parallel, I Know Where I'm Going!)
- Cyril Cusack (The Small Back Room, The Elusive Pimpernel, Gone to Earth, Ill Met by Moonlight)
- David Farrar (Black Narcissus, The Small Back Room, Gone to Earth, The Battle of the River Plate)
- Marius Goring (The Spy in Black, A Matter of Life and Death, The Red Shoes, Ill Met by Moonlight)
- Robert Helpmann (One of Our Aircraft Is Missing, The Red Shoes, The Tales of Hoffmann)
- Valerie Hobson (The Silent Battle, The Spy in Black, Contraband, Atlantic Ferry)
- Kim Hunter (A Canterbury Tale [American version], A Matter of Life and Death)
- Deborah Kerr (Contraband [deleted scenes], The Life and Death of Colonel Blimp, Black Narcissus)
- Esmond Knight (Contraband, The Silver Fleet, A Canterbury Tale, Black Narcissus, The Red Shoes, Gone to Earth, Peeping Tom, The Boy Who Turned Yellow)
- John Laurie (Red Ensign, Her Last Affaire, The Edge of the World, The Life and Death of Colonel Blimp, I Know Where I'm Going!, Return to the Edge of the World)
- Roger Livesey (The Life and Death of Colonel Blimp, I Know Where I'm Going!, A Matter of Life and Death)
- Raymond Massey (49th Parallel, A Matter of Life and Death)
- Léonide Massine (The Red Shoes, The Tales of Hoffmann, Honeymoon)
- Eric Portman (49th Parallel, One of Our Aircraft Is Missing, A Canterbury Tale, Squadron Leader X, Wanted for Murder)
- Sir Ralph Richardson (The Lion Has Wings, The Silver Fleet, Smith, The Volunteer)
- Moira Shearer (The Red Shoes, The Tales of Hoffmann, Peeping Tom)
- Conrad Veidt (The Spy in Black, Contraband, The Thief of Bagdad)
- Anton Walbrook (49th Parallel, The Life and Death of Colonel Blimp, The Red Shoes, Oh... Rosalinda!!)
- Mogens Wieth (Aila, Pohjolan tytär, The Tales of Hoffmann)
- Googie Withers (Her Last Affaire, One of Our Aircraft Is Missing, The Silver Fleet)

Notable crew members include:

- Ivor Beddoes (Assistant Art Director: The Small Back Room, The Fighting Pimpernel, Gone to Earth, The Tales of Hoffmann; Peeping Tom; Scenic Artist: Black Narcissus, The Red Shoes)
- Sir Thomas Beecham (Conductor: The Red Shoes, The Tales of Hoffmann)
- George Blackler (Makeup Artist: 49th Parallel, The Life and Death of Colonel Blimp, A Canterbury Tale, A Matter of Life and Death, Black Narcissus, The Red Shoes)
- Jack Cardiff (Cinematographer: A Matter of Life and Death, Black Narcissus, The Red Shoes; Cameraman: The Life and Death of Colonel Blimp)
- Christopher Challis (Cinematographer: The End of the River, The Small Back Room, The Elusive Pimpernel, Gone to Earth, The Tales of Hoffmann, The Sorcerer's Apprentice, Oh... Rosalinda!!, Ill Met by Moonlight; Cameraman: A Matter of Life and Death, Black Narcissus, The Red Shoes; Associate Director: The End of the River)
- Walter Percy Day (Special Effects: The Spy in Black, The Thief of Bagdad, 49th Parallel, The Life and Death of Colonel Blimp, A Canterbury Tale, I Know Where I'm Going!, A Matter of Life and Death, Black Narcissus, The Elusive Pimpernel, Gone to Earth
- Brian Easdale (Composer: Black Narcissus, The Red Shoes, The Small Back Room, The Elusive Pimpernel, Gone to Earth, The Battle of the River Plate, Peeping Tom, Return to the Edge of the World)
- Peter Ellenshaw (Assistant Matte Artist: The Thief of Bagdad, A Matter of Life and Death, Black Narcissus, The Red Shoes)
- Ernest Gasser (Makeup Artist: A Canterbury Tale, Black Narcissus, The Red Shoes)
- Allan Gray (Composer: The Silver Fleet, The Life and Death of Colonel Blimp, The Volunteer, A Canterbury Tale, I Know Where I'm Going!, A Matter of Life and Death)
- Erwin Hillier (Cinematographer: The Silver Fleet, A Canterbury Tale, I Know Where I'm Going!)
- Hein Heckroth (Costume Designer: A Matter of Life and Death, Black Narcissus, The Red Shoes, The Small Back Room, The Tales of Hoffmann; Production Designer: (The Red Shoes, The Elusive Pimpernel, Gone to Earth, The Tales of Hoffmann, The Sorcerer's Apprentice, Oh... Rosalinda!!, Herzog Blaubarts Burg)
- Alfred Junge (Production Designer: The Silver Fleet, The Life and Death of Colonel Blimp, The Volunteer, A Canterbury Tale, I Know Where I'm Going!, Stairway to Heaven, Black Narcissus; Art Director: The Fire Raisers, Red Ensign, I Know Where I'm Going! Set dresser: Blackout)
- Laurie Knight (Third Assistant Director: A Matter of Life and Death, Black Narcissus, The End of the River, The Red Shoes
- Arthur Lawson (Production Designer: The Battle of the River Plate; Art Director: The Red Shoes, The Elusive Pimpernel, Gone to Earth, The Tales of Hoffmann, Peeping Tom; Assistant Art Director: A Matter of Life and Death, Black Narcissus, Oh... Rosalinda!!; floor manager: The Life and Death of Colonel Blimp)
- David Lean (Editor: 49th Parallel, One of Our Aircraft Is Missing)
- Gordon McCallum (Dubbing: Black Narcissus, The End of the River, The Red Shoes; Sound Recordist: The Battle of the River Plate, Ill Met by Moonlight, Peeping Tom; Sound Editor: The Edge of the World, I Know Where I'm Going; Boom Operator: A Canterbury Tale)
- Reginald Mills (Editor: A Matter of Life and Death; Black Narcissus; The Red Shoes, The Elusive Pimpernel, Gone to Earth, The Tales of Hoffmann, The Sorcerer's Apprentice, Oh... Rosalinda!!, The Battle of the River Plate)
- Charles Poulton (Sound: The Red Shoes, The Elusive Pimpernel, Gone to Earth
- Kenneth K. Rick (Second Assistant Director: Black Narcissus, The Red Shoes)
- Miklós Rózsa (Composer: The Spy in Black, The Thief of Bagdad)
- John Seabourne (Writer: Aila, Pohjolan tytär; Editor: Blackout, The Life and Death of Colonel Blimp, The Volunteer, A Canterbury Tale, I Know Where I'm Going!, Aila, Pohjolan tytär; Associate Director: One of Our Aircraft Is Missing)
- Sydney Streeter (Producer: Return to the Edge of the World; Associate Producer: Oh... Rosalinda!!, The Battle of The River Plate, Ill Met by Moonlight; Assistant Director: Black Narcissus, The Red Shoes, The Small Back Room, The Elusive Pimpernel, Gone to Earth, The Tales of Hoffmann; Production Manager: One of Our Aircraft Is Missing, The Life and Death of Colonel Blimp, The Volunteer; Associate Art Director: 49th Parallel; Chief of Construction: The Edge of the World)

Powell & Pressburger also produced two films written and directed by crewmembers or compatriots of through their production company.

- The Silver Fleet, based on an original story by Pressburger, was written and directed by Vernon Sewell and Gordon Wellesley, who like Powell and Pressburger worked as a team and were both credited in both roles. Sewell had previously worked for Powell as a crew member on The Edge of the World, and Wellesley had co-written Atlantic Ferry with Pressburger.
- The End of the River was written by Wolfgang Wilhelm and directed by Derek Twist. In the 30's, Twist had edited The Fire Raisers, The Phantom Light, The Edge of the World, and The Lion Has Wings, all directed or co-directed by Powell. Wilhelm had co-written the screenplay of 1943's Squadron Leader X from a story by Pressburger.

== Critical opinions ==
Michael Powell's gift was that he saw things with terrible clarity. Perhaps his films have been waiting for DVD all along.

— Entertainment Weekly
11 January 2002

There is not a British director, working in Britain, with as many worthwhile films to his credit as Michael Powell.

— A Biographical Dictionary of the Cinema
by David Thomson, 1975

British film critics gave the films of Powell and Pressburger a mixed reaction at the time, acknowledging their creativity, but sometimes questioning their motivations and taste. For better or worse, The Archers were always out of step with mainstream British cinema.

From the 1970s onwards, British critical opinion began to revise this lukewarm assessment, with their first BFI retrospective in 1970 and another in 1978. They are now seen as playing a key part in the history of British film, and have become influential and iconic for many film-makers of later generations, such as Martin Scorsese, Francis Ford Coppola and George A. Romero, among others.

== Filmography ==
- The Spy in Black (1939)
- Contraband (1940)
- 49th Parallel (1941)
- One of Our Aircraft Is Missing (1942)
- The Life and Death of Colonel Blimp (1943)
- The Volunteer (1944)
- A Canterbury Tale (1944)
- I Know Where I'm Going! (1945)
- A Matter of Life and Death (1946)
- Black Narcissus (1947)
- The Red Shoes (1948)
- The Small Back Room (1949)
- Gone to Earth (1950)
- The Elusive Pimpernel (1950)
- The Tales of Hoffmann (1951)
- Oh... Rosalinda!! (1955)
- The Battle of the River Plate (1956)
- Ill Met by Moonlight (1957)
- They're a Weird Mob (1966)
- The Boy Who Turned Yellow (1972)

== Awards, nominations and honours ==
Four of their films are among the Top 50 British films of the 20th century according to the British Film Institute, with The Red Shoes placing in the top 10.

Year	Film	Award	Powell	Pressburger	Others
1937	The Edge of the World	Presented at the Venice Film Festival	Yes		
1943	49th Parallel	Oscar nominated for Best Picture	Yes		
1943	49th Parallel	Oscar winner for Best Writing, Original Story		Yes	
1943	49th Parallel	Oscar nominated for Best Writing, Screenplay		Yes	Rodney Ackland
1943	One of Our Aircraft Is Missing	Oscar nominated for Best Writing, Original Screenplay	Yes	Yes	
1943	One of Our Aircraft Is Missing	Oscar nominated for Best Effects, Special Effects			Ronald Neame (photographic) and C.C. Stevens (sound)
1946	A Matter of Life and Death	First ever Royal Film Performance	Yes	Yes	
1948	A Matter of Life and Death	Winner Danish Bodil Award for Best European Film	Yes	Yes	
1948	Black Narcissus	Oscar winner for Best Art Direction-Set Decoration, Color			Alfred Junge
1948	Black Narcissus	Oscar winner for Best Cinematography, Color			Jack Cardiff
1948	The Red Shoes	Nominated for Venice Film Festival Golden Lion	Yes	Yes	
1949	The Red Shoes	Oscar winner for Best Art Direction-Set Decoration, Color			Hein Heckroth and Arthur Lawson
1949	The Red Shoes	Oscar winner for Best Music, Scoring of a Dramatic or Comedy Picture			Brian Easdale
1949	The Red Shoes	Oscar nominated for Best Picture	Yes	Yes	
1949	The Red Shoes	Oscar nominated for Best Writing, Original Story		Yes	
1949	The Red Shoes	Oscar nominated for Best Film Editing		Yes	Reginald Mills
1950	The Small Back Room	BAFTA Award nominated for Best British Film	Yes	Yes	
1951	The Tales of Hoffmann	Oscar nominated for Best Art Direction-Set Decoration, Color			Hein Heckroth
1951	The Tales of Hoffmann	Oscar nominated for Best Costume Design, Color			Hein Heckroth
1951	The Tales of Hoffmann	Cannes Film Festival nominated for Grand Prize of the Festival	Yes	Yes	
1951	The Tales of Hoffmann	Winner Silver Berlin Bear from Berlin International Film Festival as Best Musical	Yes	Yes	
1956	The Battle of the River Plate	Selected for the Royal Film Performance	Yes	Yes	
1957	The Battle of the River Plate	BAFTA Award nominated for Best British Film	Yes	Yes	
1957	The Battle of the River Plate	BAFTA Award nominated for Best British Screenplay	Yes	Yes	
1957	The Battle of the River Plate	BAFTA Award nominated for Best Film from any Source	Yes	Yes	
1959	Luna de Miel	Cannes Film Festival nominated for Golden Palm	Yes		
1970		Partial retrospective of their films at the National Film Theatre	Yes	Yes	
1972	The Boy Who Turned Yellow	Children's Film Foundation winner of the 'Chiffy' award for the best film	Yes		
1978		Made Hon DLitt, University of East Anglia	Yes		
1978		Made Hon DLitt, University of Kent	Yes		
1978		Retrospective of their extant works at the National Film Theatre	Yes	Yes	
1980		Dartmouth Film Award	Yes		
1981		BAFTA Academy Fellowship Award	Yes	Yes	
1982		Awarded Career Gold Lion from the Venice Film Festival	Yes		
1983		Made Fellows of the British Film Institute (BFI)	Yes	Yes	
1987		Awarded Hon Doctorate, Royal College of Art	Yes		
1987		Akira Kurosawa Award from San Francisco International Film Festival	Yes		

Powell and Pressburger, the people and their films have been the subject of many documentaries and books as well as doctoral research.

An English Heritage blue plaque to commemorate Powell and Pressburger was unveiled on 17 February 2014 by Martin Scorsese and Thelma Schoonmaker at Dorset House, Gloucester Place, London, where The Archers had their offices from 1942–47.

== See also ==
- Cinema of the United Kingdom
