= The Elusive Pimpernel (1949 film) =

1949 film

The Elusive Pimpernel (The Fighting Pimpernel)
- Theatrical poster
- Directed by: Michael Powell; Emeric Pressburger
- Written by: Baroness Orczy (novels); Michael Powell; Emeric Pressburger
- Produced by: Michael Powell; Emeric Pressburger
- Starring: David Niven; Margaret Leighton; Jack Hawkins; Cyril Cusack; Robert Coote
- Cinematography: Christopher Challis
- Edited by: Reginald Mills
- Music by: Brian Easdale
- Production company: London Films
- Distributed by: British Lion Films
- Release dates: 1 September 1949 (Venice Film Festival); 1 January 1951 (UK)
- Running time: 109 minutes
- Country: United Kingdom
- Language: English
- Budget: £477,000
- Box office: £133,354 (UK)

The Elusive Pimpernel is a 1949 British period adventure film by the British-based director-writer team of Michael Powell and Emeric Pressburger, based on the novel The Scarlet Pimpernel (1905) by Baroness Emmuska Orczy. It was released in the United States under the title The Fighting Pimpernel. The picture stars David Niven as Sir Percy Blakeney (a.k.a. The Scarlet Pimpernel) and Margaret Leighton as Marguerite Blakeney and features Jack Hawkins, Cyril Cusack and Robert Coote. Originally intended to be a musical, the film was re-worked as a light-hearted drama.

== Plot ==
During the French Revolution, the Scarlet Pimpernel, who is really Sir Percy Blakeney in disguise, risks his life to rescue French aristocrats from the guillotine and take them across the English Channel to safety. As cover, Sir Percy poses as a fop at Court and curries favour with the Prince of Wales by providing advice about fashion, but secretly he leads The League, a group of noblemen with similar views.

Chauvelin, the French ambassador to England, wants to find out who the Pimpernel is, so he can be brought to French justice. He blackmails Blakeney's French wife Marguerite into helping him by threatening to have her brother Armand (an associate of the Pimpernel) arrested and tortured. She intercepts a letter intended for the Pimpernel and gives it to Chauvelin, unaware that she has betrayed her husband. When she discovers the truth, she sets out to warn him of his great peril.

== Cast ==
- David Niven as Sir Percy Blakeney/ The Scarlet Pimpernel
- Margaret Leighton as Marguerite Blakeney
- Jack Hawkins as Prince of Wales/Footpad attacking Lord Anthony
- Cyril Cusack as Chauvelin
- Robert Coote as Sir Andrew Ffoulkes
- Arlette Marchal as Comtesse de Tournai
- Gérard Nery as Philippe de Tournai
- Danielle Godet as Suzanne de Tournai
- Edmond Audran as Armand St. Juste
- Charles Victor as Colonel Winterbotham
- Eugene Deckers as Captain Merieres
- David Oxley as Captain Duroc
- Raymond Rollett as Bibot
- Philip Stainton as Jellyband
- John Longden as The Abbot
- Robert Griffiths as Trubshaw
- Patrick Macnee as the Hon. John Bristow

== Production ==
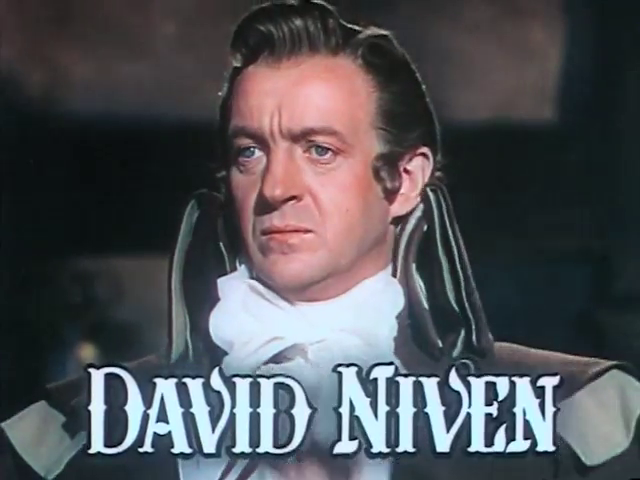
From the film's trailer

The Elusive Pimpernel was financed by Samuel Goldwyn and Alexander Korda. Neither director Michael Powell nor star David Niven was very interested in doing the film, but had their minds changed by threats of contract suspension. (Rex Harrison had been originally announced as the star.) Powell wanted to make the film as a musical, but was not allowed to, and Margaret Leighton was cast despite his objection. Goldwyn forced numerous additions and changes to the film but when Powell delivered the final cut, Goldwyn refused to make the final payment, which caused Korda to sue him.

The film was shot in 1949 at various British film studios in Boreham Wood, Elstree and Shepperton, Surrey. Location shooting took place in Bath, Dover, in Savernake Forest, on the Marlborough Downs, and in the stables of Carlton House Terrace, St. James's, London. In France, filming took place in the chateaux of the Loire Valley and on Mont Saint-Michel.

== Release ==
The Elusive Pimpernel was released in the UK in 1950, but because of the falling out between Korda and Goldwyn, did not gain an American distributor until July 1953 when Carroll Pictures acquired the rights. The film then premiered in New York City on 17 April 1954.

Niven's unhappiness at being forced to make the film later led to him severing his contract with Samuel Goldwyn.
