= Royal Film Performance =

UK film event

The Royal Film Performance is a trademarked event owned by The Film and Television Charity, formerly known as the Cinema & Television Benevolent Fund CTBF (from 1964 to 2017) and previously the Cinematograph Trade Benevolent Fund (from its inception in 1924). The event showcases a major film premiere and is attended by members of the British royal family. The proceeds from the event help the charity to offer financial support to people from the film, TV and cinema industries.

The event began in 1946, as the Royal Command Film Performance, with a screening of A Matter of Life and Death. The charity first received Royal Patronage in 1936, and so the idea of a Royal screening was born. The original date of the first event was 18 October 1939 and it was to be called the Royal Cine-Variety Performance, but it was postponed due to the outbreak of World War II.

The "Royal Command" name was changed from 1949, to Royal Film Performance, on the basis that the choice of film was that of the CTBF rather than the Royal Family. There was no performance in 1958 due to a fuel crisis. There was no performance between 2015 and 2019 while the CTBF was reformed as The Film and Television Charity. There was no event in 2020 or 2021 due to the global COVID-19 pandemic.

== History of events ==
Number	Date	Title	Venue	Attendees
73	22 September 2026	Digger	Odeon Luxe Leicester Square	William, Prince of Wales and Catherine, Princess of Wales
72	13 November 2024	Gladiator II	Odeon Luxe Leicester Square	Charles III (Note: Queen Camilla originally planned to join the King but cancelled due to a chest infection.)
71	19 May 2022	Top Gun: Maverick	Odeon Luxe Leicester Square	Prince William, Duke of Cambridge and Catherine, Duchess of Cambridge
70	4 December 2019	1917	Odeon Luxe Leicester Square	Charles, Prince of Wales and Camilla, Duchess of Cornwall
69	26 October 2015	Spectre	Royal Albert Hall	Prince William, Duke of Cambridge, Catherine, Duchess of Cambridge and Prince Harry
68	17 February 2015	The Second Best Exotic Marigold Hotel	Odeon Leicester Square	Charles, Prince of Wales and Camilla, Duchess of Cornwall
67	5 December 2013	Mandela: Long Walk to Freedom	Odeon Leicester Square	Prince William, Duke of Cambridge and Catherine, Duchess of Cambridge
66	12 December 2012	The Hobbit: An Unexpected Journey	Odeon Leicester Square	Prince William, Duke of Cambridge
65	28 November 2011	Hugo	Odeon Leicester Square	Charles, Prince of Wales and Camilla, Duchess of Cornwall
64	30 November 2010	The Chronicles of Narnia: The Voyage of the Dawn Treader	Odeon Leicester Square	Elizabeth II and Prince Philip, Duke of Edinburgh
63	24 November 2009	The Lovely Bones	Odeon Leicester Square	Charles, Prince of Wales and Camilla, Duchess of Cornwall
62	17 November 2008	A Bunch of Amateurs	Odeon Leicester Square	Elizabeth II and Prince Philip, Duke of Edinburgh
61	19 February 2008	The Other Boleyn Girl	Odeon Leicester Square	Charles, Prince of Wales and Camilla, Duchess of Cornwall
60	14 November 2006	Casino Royale	Odeon Leicester Square	Elizabeth II and Prince Philip, Duke of Edinburgh
59	7 December 2005	The Chronicles of Narnia: The Lion, the Witch and the Wardrobe	Royal Albert Hall	Charles, Prince of Wales and Camilla, Duchess of Cornwall
58	8 November 2004	Ladies in Lavender	Odeon Leicester Square	Elizabeth II
57	17 November 2003	Master and Commander: The Far Side of the World	Odeon Leicester Square	Charles, Prince of Wales
56	18 November 2002	Die Another Day	Royal Albert Hall	Elizabeth II and Prince Philip, Duke of Edinburgh
55	11 December 2001	Ali	Empire, Leicester Square	Charles, Prince of Wales
54	15 November 2000	How the Grinch Stole Christmas	Odeon Leicester Square	Elizabeth II
53	14 July 1999	Star Wars: Episode I – The Phantom Menace	Odeon Leicester Square	Charles, Prince of Wales
52	9 November 1998	The Parent Trap	Odeon Leicester Square	Elizabeth II and Prince Philip, Duke of Edinburgh
51	18 November 1997	Titanic	Empire, Leicester Square	Charles, Prince of Wales
50	12 November 1996	True Blue	Odeon Leicester Square	Elizabeth II and Prince Philip, Duke of Edinburgh
49	18 October 1995	French Kiss	Empire, Leicester Square	Charles, Prince of Wales
48	21 November 1994	Miracle on 34th Street	Odeon Leicester Square	Elizabeth II
47	16 November 1993	The Man Without a Face	Odeon Leicester Square	Charles, Prince of Wales
46	15 December 1992	Chaplin	Odeon Leicester Square	Elizabeth II and Prince Philip, Duke of Edinburgh
45	18 November 1991	Hot Shots!	Odeon Leicester Square	Charles, Prince of Wales and Diana, Princess of Wales
44	19 March 1990	Always	Odeon Leicester Square	Elizabeth II and Prince Philip, Duke of Edinburgh
43	20 March 1989	Madame Sousatzka	Odeon Leicester Square	Queen Elizabeth the Queen Mother and Princess Margaret, Countess of Snowdon
42	21 March 1988	Empire of the Sun	Odeon Leicester Square	Elizabeth II (Note: Prince Philip, Duke of Edinburgh originally planned to join the Queen but cancelled due to a heavy cold.)
41	23 March 1987	84 Charing Cross Road	Odeon Leicester Square	Queen Elizabeth the Queen Mother, Charles, Prince of Wales and Diana, Princess of Wales
40	20 March 1986	White Nights	Odeon Leicester Square	Elizabeth II and Prince Philip, Duke of Edinburgh
39	18 March 1985	A Passage to India	Odeon Leicester Square	Queen Elizabeth the Queen Mother, Charles, Prince of Wales, Diana, Princess of Wales and Princess Anne
38	19 March 1984	The Dresser	Odeon Leicester Square	Elizabeth II and Prince Philip, Duke of Edinburgh
37	21 March 1983	Table for Five	Odeon Leicester Square	Queen Elizabeth the Queen Mother and Princess Margaret, Countess of Snowdon
36	22 March 1982	Evil Under the Sun	Odeon Leicester Square	Elizabeth II and Prince Philip, Duke of Edinburgh
35	30 March 1981	Chariots of Fire	Odeon Leicester Square	Queen Elizabeth the Queen Mother and Princess Margaret, Countess of Snowdon
34	17 March 1980	Kramer vs. Kramer	Odeon Leicester Square	Elizabeth II and Prince Philip, Duke of Edinburgh
33	19 March 1979	California Suite	Odeon Leicester Square	Queen Elizabeth the Queen Mother, Princess Anne and Princess Margaret, Countess of Snowdon
32	13 March 1978	Close Encounters of the Third Kind	Odeon Leicester Square	Elizabeth II and Prince Philip, Duke of Edinburgh
31	30 March 1977	Silver Streak	Odeon Leicester Square	Queen Elizabeth the Queen Mother, Princess Margaret, Countess of Snowdon and Princess Alexandra
30	24 March 1976	The Slipper and the Rose	Odeon Leicester Square	Queen Elizabeth the Queen Mother and Princess Alexandra
29	17 March 1975	Funny Lady	Odeon Leicester Square	Elizabeth II
28	25 March 1974	The Three Musketeers	Odeon Leicester Square	Queen Elizabeth the Queen Mother
27	26 March 1973	Lost Horizon	Odeon Leicester Square	Elizabeth II
26	27 March 1972	Mary, Queen of Scots	Odeon Leicester Square	Queen Elizabeth the Queen Mother, Princess Margaret, Countess of Snowdon and Antony Armstrong-Jones, Earl of Snowdon
25	8 March 1971	Love Story	Odeon Leicester Square	Queen Elizabeth the Queen Mother, Princess Margaret, Countess of Snowdon and Prince William of Gloucester
24	23 February 1970	Anne of the Thousand Days	Odeon Leicester Square	Elizabeth II and Princess Anne
23	24 February 1969	The Prime of Miss Jean Brodie	Odeon Leicester Square	Queen Elizabeth the Queen Mother, Princess Margaret, Countess of Snowdon, Antony Armstrong-Jones, Earl of Snowdon, Princess Alexandra and Prince Michael of Kent
22	4 March 1968	Romeo and Juliet	Odeon Leicester Square	Elizabeth II, Prince Philip, Duke of Edinburgh and Charles, Prince of Wales
21	27 February 1967	The Taming of the Shrew	Odeon Leicester Square	Princess Margaret, Countess of Snowdon and Antony Armstrong-Jones, Earl of Snowdon
20	14 March 1966	Born Free (second feature: Winnie the Pooh and the Honey Tree)	Odeon Leicester Square	Elizabeth II, Prince Edward, Duke of Kent and Katharine, Duchess of Kent
19	15 February 1965	Lord Jim	Odeon Leicester Square	Queen Elizabeth the Queen Mother, Princess Margaret, Countess of Snowdon, Antony Armstrong-Jones, Earl of Snowdon and Prince William of Gloucester
18	24 February 1964	Move Over, Darling	Odeon Leicester Square	Prince Philip, Duke of Edinburgh
17	18 March 1963	Sammy Going South	Odeon Leicester Square	Queen Elizabeth the Queen Mother, Princess Margaret, Countess of Snowdon, Antony Armstrong-Jones, Earl of Snowdon, Princess Alexandra and Angus Ogilvy
16	26 February 1962	West Side Story	Odeon Leicester Square	Elizabeth II
15	20 February 1961	The Facts of Life	Odeon Leicester Square	Queen Elizabeth the Queen Mother, Princess Margaret, Countess of Snowdon and Antony Armstrong-Jones, Earl of Snowdon
14	28 March 1960	The Last Angry Man	Odeon Leicester Square	Prince Philip, Duke of Edinburgh, Princess Marina, Duchess of Kent and Princess Alexandra
13	2 February 1959	The Horse's Mouth	Empire, Leicester Square	Queen Elizabeth the Queen Mother and Princess Margaret
12	4 November 1957	Les Girls	Odeon Leicester Square	Elizabeth II, Prince Philip, Duke of Edinburgh and Princess Alexandra
11	29 October 1956	The Battle of the River Plate	Empire, Leicester Square	Elizabeth II, Princess Margaret and Louis Mountbatten, Earl Mountbatten of Burma
10	31 October 1955	To Catch a Thief	Odeon Leicester Square	Elizabeth II and Philip, Duke of Edinburgh
9	15 November 1954	Beau Brummell	Empire, Leicester Square	Elizabeth II, Philip, Duke of Edinburgh and Princess Margaret
8	26 October 1953	Rob Roy	Odeon Leicester Square	Elizabeth II, Philip, Duke of Edinburgh and Princess Margaret
7	27 October 1952	Because You're Mine	Empire, Leicester Square	Elizabeth II, Philip, Duke of Edinburgh and Princess Margaret
6	5 November 1951	Where No Vultures Fly	Odeon Leicester Square	Queen Elizabeth and Princess Margaret
5	30 October 1950	The Mudlark	Empire, Leicester Square	George VI, Queen Elizabeth, Princess Elizabeth and Princess Margaret
4	17 November 1949	The Forsyte Saga	Odeon Marble Arch	George VI, Queen Elizabeth, Princess Elizabeth and Princess Margaret
3	29 November 1948	Scott of the Antarctic	Empire, Leicester Square	Queen Elizabeth, Princess Margaret and Philip, Duke of Edinburgh
2	25 November 1947	The Bishop's Wife	Odeon Leicester Square	George VI, Queen Elizabeth, Princess Margaret, Queen Ingrid of Denmark and King Michael I of Romania
1	1 November 1946	A Matter of Life and Death	Empire, Leicester Square	George VI, Queen Elizabeth, Princess Elizabeth and Princess Margaret

== Attendees ==
Attendee	Number of performances	First performance	Most recent performance
Elizabeth II	32	1946	2010
Charles III	17	1968	2024
George VI	4	1946	1950
Queen Elizabeth, the Queen Mother	22	1946	1989
Philip, Duke of Edinburgh	22	1948	2010
Queen Camilla	6	2005	2019
Diana, Princess of Wales	3	1985	1991
William, Prince of Wales	5	2012	2026
Catherine, Princess of Wales	4	2013	2026
Princess Margaret	23	1946	1989
Princess Anne	3	1970	1985
Prince Harry	1	2015	2015

== Venues ==
Venue	Number of performances	First performance	Most recent performance
Odeon Leicester Square/Odeon Luxe Leicester Square	59	1947	2026
Empire, Leicester Square	10	1946	2001
Royal Albert Hall	3	2002	2015
Odeon Marble Arch	1	1949	1949
