= Bibi Ferreira =

Brazilian actress, singer, and director (1922–2019)

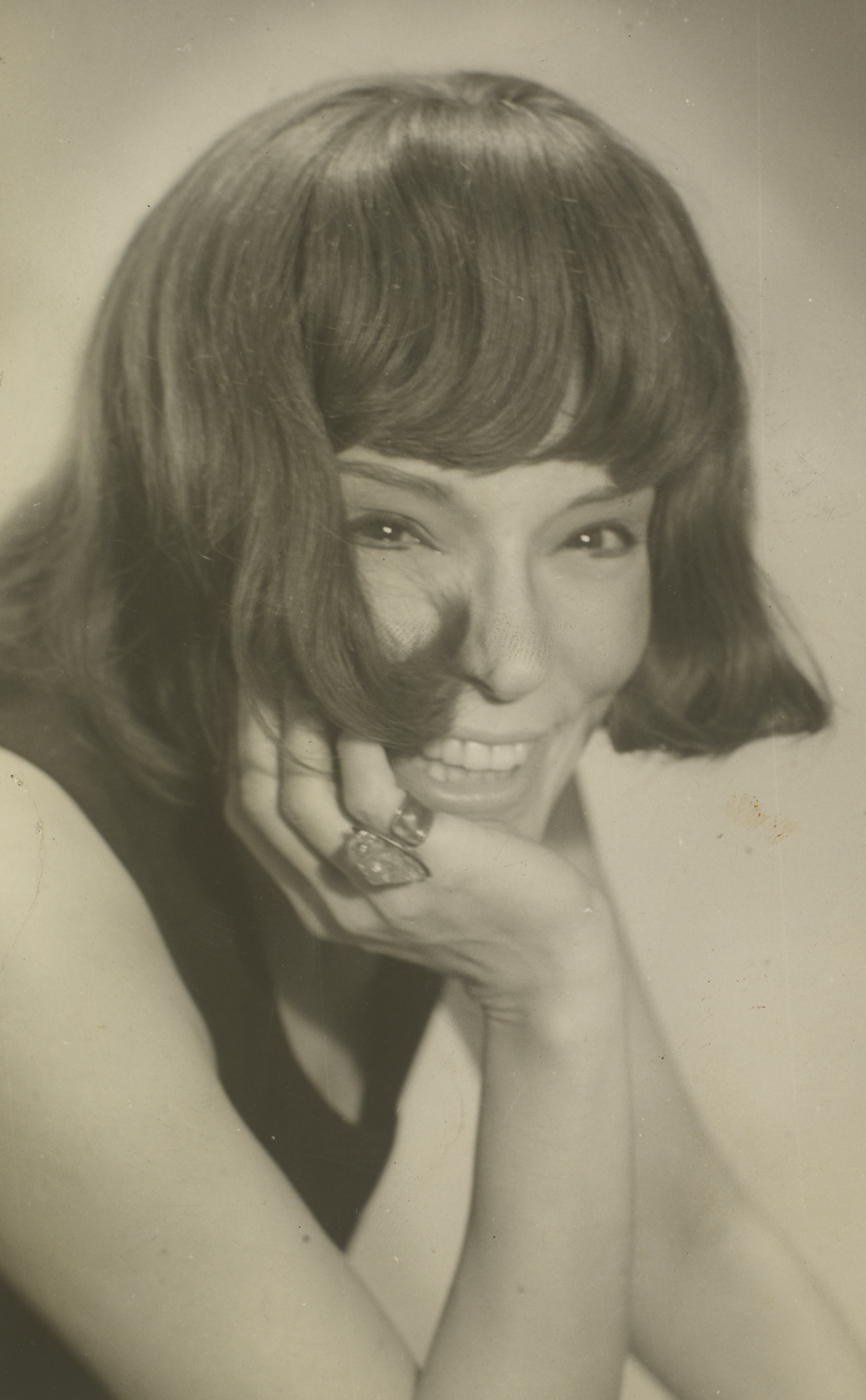
- Ferreira in 1968
- Born: Abigail Izquierdo Ferreira; 1 June 1922; Rio de Janeiro, Brazil
- Died: 13 February 2019 (aged 96); Rio de Janeiro, Brazil
- Occupation: Actress
- Years active: 1941–2018
- Spouse: Paulo Pontes (m. 1968; died 1976)
- Children: 1

Abigail Izquierdo Ferreira (1 June 1922 – 13 February 2019), known as Bibi Ferreira, was a Brazilian actress, singer, and director. In a career spanning more than 75 years, Ferreira directed and performed in numerous theatrical productions and was recognized as one of the great divas of Brazilian music.

== Early life ==
Ferreira was born in Rio de Janeiro, the daughter of stage actor Procópio Ferreira and Spanish dancer Aida Izquierdo, born in Alicante. Her paternal grandparents came from Madeira Island, Portugal; her maternal grandparents, Antonio Izquierdo and Irma Queirolo, were born in Spain and Uruguay, respectively.

Bibi learned dance at Teatro Municipal in Rio de Janeiro.

== Career ==
Her father invited his daughter to join his company. She made her stage debut performing La Locandiera at Teatro Serrador in Rio de Janeiro, on 28 February 1941. She formed her own company three years later. During this period, she began hosting several talk and variety television shows, giving new artists and playwrights the opportunity to present their work.

In 1962, she was cast in the Brazilian production of My Fair Lady, which set a Brazilian record for its 2 1/2-year run. She then played leads in Hello Dolly and Man of La Mancha. In the 1970s, she began directing her own productions. Ferreira began performing in a musical about Édith Piaf in 1983, and toured the show through Europe.

Ferreira was a prominent figure in the Brazilian entertainment industry. Her protégé, singer Maria Bethânia, said of Ferreira, "Everything she does has helped Brazil with its identity." The French Government awarded her the Ordre des Arts et des Lettres in 1985. In 2016, Ferreira appeared in "Bibi Times Four", a one-woman show at Symphony Space in New York City.

== Later life and death ==
In 1968, Ferreira married Paulo Pontes, a playwright. In 1970, she performed in Gota D'Agua, a play Pontes wrote. Pontes died in 1976. Ferreira died in Rio de Janeiro on February 13, 2019, from a cardiac arrest.
