= Christopher Challis =

British cinematographer (1919–2012)

Christopher Challis BSC, FRPS
- Born: Christopher George Joseph Challis; 18 March 1919; London, England
- Died: 31 May 2012 (aged 93); Bristol, England
- Occupation: Cinematographer

President of the British Society of Cinematographers
- In office 1962–1964
- Preceded by: Oswald Morris
- Succeeded by: Geoffrey Unsworth

Christopher George Joseph Challis BSC, FRPS (18 March 1919 – 31 May 2012) was an English cinematographer. He was well-known for his collaborations with the directing duo of Powell and Pressburger, and worked on more than 70 feature films from the 1940s onwards. He won a BAFTA Award for his work on Arabesque (1966), among four total nominations.

Challis was the 6th President of the British Society of Cinematographers, serving from 1962 to 1964.

== Career ==
After working as camera operator on several films for Michael Powell and Emeric Pressburger, he made his debut as director of photography on The End of the River (1947) one of their projects as producers. After filming of The End of the River concluded, Challis was camera operator under Jack Cardiff on The Red Shoes. He did not object to the demotion as he wanted to work on the film. Following this he went back to being director of photography. He was cinematographer on most of Powell and Pressburger's later films, including The Small Back Room (1949), The Elusive Pimpernel (1950), The Tales of Hoffmann (1951), Oh... Rosalinda!! (1955), The Battle of the River Plate (1956) and Ill Met by Moonlight (1957).

His expertise in colour cinematography meant that he was frequently chosen by British film makers of the 1950s to work on their projects, and he worked on a number of successful comedies, including Genevieve (1953), The Captain's Table (1958) and Those Magnificent Men in Their Flying Machines (1965). He worked on projects in other genres as well, such as The Spanish Gardener (1956), the war film Sink the Bismarck! (1960), Chitty Chitty Bang Bang (1968), and Billy Wilder's The Private Life of Sherlock Holmes (1970). He was nominated for several BAFTA Awards for Best British Cinematography, including a win in 1966 for Stanley Donen's film Arabesque.

Challis is credited with being the first person to create specially modified 5000-watt 'Senior' luminaries to provide cinematic lighting underwater while filming The Deep in 1976.

Martin Scorsese said: "It is not possible even to begin to take the full measure of the greatness of British filmmaking without thinking of Chris Challis," and: "Chris Challis brought a vibrancy to the celluloid palette that was entirely his own, and which helped make Britain a leader in that long, glorious period of classic world cinema."

Challis was also an accomplished and enthusiastic still photographer. He joined The Royal Photographic Society in 1936, gaining his Associateship in 1945 and Fellowship in 1948. He remained a member until his death.

== Publications ==
His autobiography, Are They Really So Awful?: A Cameraman's Chronicle, was published by Janus Publishing Company (ISBN 1-85756-193-7) in March 1995.

Challis also features in the book Conversations with Cinematographers (Scarecrow Press) by David A. Ellis (2012).
