= Reginald Mills =

British film editor (1912–1990)

- Born: Reginald Cuthbert Mills; 15 September 1912; London, England
- Died: July 1990 (aged 77)
- Occupation: Filmmaker

Reginald Mills (15 September 1912 – July 1990) was a British film editor and one-time film director with more than thirty feature film credits. Among his prominent films are The Red Shoes (1948), for which he received his only Academy Award nomination, The Servant (1963), and Romeo and Juliet (1968).

== Early life and career ==
Mills studied at Christ's College, Cambridge, graduating with a degree in modern languages in 1934. He was the assistant to David Lean (then an editor) on two films directed by Paul Czinner, As You Like It (1936) and Dreaming Lips (1937). Mills then worked for Publicity Films at Merton Park Studios, both as a director and editor of films for commercial clients.

During World War II (1939–1945) he was stationed in an anti-aircraft battery on the Thames Estuary throughout the whole of the London Blitz. He served with the Army Kinematograph Unit, and was the uncredited editor for a military orientation film, The New Lot (directed by Carol Reed-1943).

== Years with Powell and Pressburger ==
After the war he began a fruitful association with the film-making partnership called "The Archers", which was led by Michael Powell and Emeric Pressburger. His first credit was for A Matter of Life and Death (1946), followed by Black Narcissus (1947). Mills received an Academy Award nomination for his work on the Archers' ballet film, The Red Shoes (1948). A 2010 appreciation of the film by Peter Canavese notes Mills' contributions, "The still astonishing expressionistic dance sequence that stands as a performance of the Ballet Lermontov's The Red Shoes ... is rapturous, as a feast of theatrical lighting and Technicolor photography (shot by the brilliant cinematographer Jack Cardiff), the choreography of Robert Helpmann, the music of Brian Easdale and the montage of editor Reginald Mills." Implicitly acknowledging its editing, Michael Sragow wrote in 2011, "Yes, The Red Shoes is ecstatic entertainment. ... But is it realistic? Only in the manner of an Expressionist painting. Powell and Pressburger create a stylized, intoxicating environment that fuses art and life and dance and cinema." The Tales of Hoffmann (1951) also incorporated ballet in its adaptation of the original Offenbach opera, and André Bazin wrote at the time, "The cinema thus creates here a new artistic monster: the best legs adorned by the best voice. Not only is opera liberated from its material constraints but also from its human limitations. Lastly, dance itself is renewed by the photography and the editing, which allows a kind of choreography of the second degree where the rhythm of the dance is served by that of the cinema."

The Battle of the River Plate (1956) was Mills' last film with Powell and Pressburger, whose partnership broke up shortly thereafter. Mills had edited twelve films for The Archers.

== Later career ==
Mills edited seven films with Joseph Losey, an American director who settled in Britain after being blacklisted at home. Mills edited Losey's first British film, The Sleeping Tiger (1954). Perhaps the most successful film of their collaboration was The Servant (1963), which is considered to be a high point in Losey's career. Mills had a fairly public artistic dispute with screenwriter Harold Pinter about the editing of The Servant that likely led to the end of Mills' collaboration with Losey. Losey and Mills did make one final film together (King & Country – 1964) that did not involve Pinter. Reginald Beck, who had edited two films with Losey prior to 1964, subsequently became Losey's principal editor for the rest of his career.

Other credits from this period include The Spanish Gardener (directed by Philip Leacock – 1956) and Joseph Strick's film Ulysses (1967), which adapted James Joyce's 1922 novel. Interviewing Strick in 2009, Henry K. Miller wrote, "the long montage sequence that accompanies Molly is a tour de force. Mills 'added something to the picture,' says Strick, describing a quick-cut counterpoint to Molly's fantasy about picking up a sailor."

Mills directed the ballet film The Tales of Beatrix Potter (1971); the film, which is without dialogue, weaves dances choreographed by Sir Frederick Ashton and performed by the members of the Royal Ballet. The film received some favourable reviews, and has been released to DVD (2004) and to Blu-ray (2011), the latter a restored version celebrating the film's 40th anniversary. Mills subsequently produced the documentary Franco Zeffirelli: A Florentine Artist (1973) based on the filming of Zeffirelli's Brother Sun, Sister Moon; the documentary was not included in the 2004 DVD release of the film.

He received BAFTA nominations for his editing of two films with director Franco Zeffirelli: Romeo and Juliet (1968) and Jesus of Nazareth (1977). Mills was the supervising editor for Zeffirelli's Brother Sun, Sister Moon (1972). Mills last credit was as consulting editor on still another Zeffirelli picture, The Champ (1979).

== See also ==
- List of film director and editor collaborations
