= I Know Where I'm Going! =

1945 film by Emeric Pressburger, Michael Powell

- theatrical poster
- Directed by: Michael Powell; Emeric Pressburger
- Written by: Michael Powell; Emeric Pressburger
- Produced by: Michael Powell; Emeric Pressburger; George R. Busby (associate producer)
- Starring: Wendy Hiller; Roger Livesey; Pamela Brown
- Cinematography: Erwin Hillier
- Edited by: John Seabourne Sr.
- Music by: Allan Gray
- Production company: The Archers
- Distributed by: General Film Distributors
- Release dates: 16 November 1945 (UK); 9 August 1947 (US)
- Running time: 88 minutes
- Country: United Kingdom
- Languages: English; Gaelic
- Budget: £230,000

I Know Where I'm Going! is a 1945 romance film directed and written by the British filmmakers Michael Powell and Emeric Pressburger. It stars Wendy Hiller and Roger Livesey, and features Pamela Brown.

== Plot ==
Joan Webster is a 25-year-old, upper middle class Englishwoman with an ambitious, independent spirit, who always "knows where she's going". She leaves her home in Manchester for the isle of Kiloran in the Hebrides to marry industrialist Sir Robert Bellinger, one of the wealthiest men in England, and nearly her father's age.

She reaches the Isle of Mull. When bad weather prevents Bellinger from retrieving her for the short boat trip to Kiloran, she is forced to wait it out among a community of people whose values are quite different from hers. There she meets Torquil MacNeil, a Royal Navy officer trying to get home to Kiloran while on an 8-day shore leave. She also meets some of the residents, such as the boatman Ruairidh Mhór, the eccentric falconer Colonel Barnstaple, and the poor but proud gentry Catriona Potts, a friend of Torquil's since childhood who takes them in for the night.

The next day, on their way to catch a bus to Tobermory, Joan and Torquil come upon the ruins of Moy Castle. Joan wants to look inside, but Torquil refuses to enter. When she reminds him that the terrible curse associated with it only applies to the lairds of Kiloran, he reveals that he is the laird; Bellinger is only renting his island for the duration of the war. On the bus, the locals, unaware of Joan's identity, recount disparaging stories about Bellinger.

In Tobermory, Joan uses the radio to contact Bellinger, and Torquil gets two hotel rooms. Before entering the hotel's restaurant, Joan asks him for decorum's sake to sit at a different table. As the bad weather deteriorates into a full-scale gale, Torquil spends more time with Joan, who becomes torn between her ambition and her growing attraction to him. The two attend a ceilidh celebrating a couple's diamond wedding anniversary; three bagpipers, hired to play at Joan's wedding and stranded like her on Mull, perform. Torquil translates the song "Nut-Brown Maiden" for Joan, emphasising the line "You're the maid for me." Despite Joan's hesitancy, she is persuaded to dance, and dazzles.

Desperate to salvage her carefully laid plans, Joan convinces Ruairidh Mhór's young mate, Kenny, to attempt the crossing alone for £20. Unable to talk Joan out of the highly dangerous trip, Torquil invites himself aboard after Catriona tells him that Joan is running away from him. En route, the boat is caught in the Corryvreckan whirlpool, but Torquil restarts the flooded engine just in time. The trio return battered to Mull.

Finally, the weather clears. Before going their separate ways Torquil asks Joan if she would somewhere, sometime, have the pipers play "Nut-Brown Maiden". Joan then asks Torquil for a parting kiss, delivered and received with passion. After Joan leaves, Torquil enters Moy Castle and finds the inscription of the curse, which was placed centuries earlier on Torquil's ancestor who had stormed the castle and captured his unfaithful wife and her lover. He had the pair bound together and cast into the castle's well, which had a stone just big enough for one person to stand on. When the lovers' strength finally gave out, they dragged one another down and drowned. Before she died, the woman cursed Kiloran and every future MacNeil of Kiloran: "If he shall ever cross the threshold of Moy never shall he leave it a free man. He shall be chained to a woman to the end of his days and shall die in his chains." From the battlements, Torquil sees Joan marching towards him, preceded by the three pipers playing "Nut-Brown Maiden". The couple meet in the castle and embrace.

== Cast ==
In order of appearance, as per ending credits:

- George Carney as Mr. Webster
- Wendy Hiller as Joan Webster
- Walter Hudd as Hunter
- Captain Duncan MacKechnie as Captain "Lochinvar"
- Ian Sadler as Iain
- Roger Livesey as Torquil MacNeil
- Finlay Currie as Ruairidh Mhór
- Murdo Morrison as Kenny
- Margot Fitzsimons as Bridie
- Captain C. W. R. Knight as Colonel Barnstaple
- Pamela Brown as Catriona
- Donald Strachan as Shepherd
- John Rae as Old Shepherd
- Duncan McIntyre as his son
- Jean Cadell as postmistress
- Norman Shelley as Sir Robert Bellinger (voice)
- Ivy Milton as Peigi
- Anthony Eustrel as Hooper
- Petula Clark as Cheril
- Alec Faversham as Martin
- Catherine Lacey as Mrs. Robinson
- Valentine Dyall as Mr. Robinson
- Nancy Price as Mrs. Crozier
- Herbert Lomas as Mr. Campbell
- Kitty Kirwan as Mrs. Campbell
- John Laurie as John Campbell
- Graham Moffatt as R.A.F. Sergeant
- Boyd Stephen, Maxwell Kennedy and Jean Houston as singers in the cèilidh (Members of the Glasgow Orpheus Choir)
- Arthur Chesney as harmonica players [sic]
- Mr. Ramshaw as Torquil the eagle

== Production ==
=== Development ===
Powell and Pressburger wanted to make A Matter of Life and Death but filming was held up because they wanted to do the film in colour and there was a shortage of Technicolor film stock during the Second World War—it was all being used for Ministry of Information training films.

Pressburger suggested that instead they make a film that was part of the "crusade against materialism", a theme they had tackled in A Canterbury Tale, only in a more accessible romantic comedy format.

The story was originally called The Misty Island. Pressburger wanted to make a film about a girl who wants to get to an island, but by the end of the film no longer wants to. Powell suggested an island on Scotland's west coast. He and Pressburger spent several weeks researching locations and decided on the Isle of Mull.

Pressburger wrote the screenplay in four days. "It just burst out, you couldn't hold back," he said.

The movie was originally meant to star Deborah Kerr and James Mason but Kerr could not get out of her contract with MGM, so they cast Wendy Hiller. Hiller was originally cast in the three roles Kerr played in The Life and Death of Colonel Blimp but had to withdraw when she became pregnant.

Six weeks before filming, Mason pulled out of the movie, saying he did not want to go on location. Roger Livesey read the script and asked to play the role. Powell thought he was too old and portly but Livesey lost "ten or twelve pounds" (four or five kilos) and lightened his hair; Powell was convinced.

Powell's golden cocker spaniels Erik and Spangle made their third appearance in an Archers film: previously in Contraband (1940) and The Life and Death of Colonel Blimp (1943), they were later also to be seen in A Matter of Life and Death (1946). Pressburger later said that when he visited Paramount Pictures in 1947 the head of the script department told him they considered the film's screenplay perfect and frequently watched it for inspiration.

=== Filming ===
Shooting took place on the Isle of Mull and at Denham Film Studios.

It was the second and last collaboration between the co-directors and cinematographer Erwin Hillier (who shot the entire film without a light meter).

Both hero and heroine of the film are trying to get to "Kiloran", but nobody ever gets there. From various topographical references and a map briefly shown in the film, it is clear that the Isle of Kiloran is based on Colonsay, south of Mull. The name Kiloran was borrowed from one of Colonsay's bays, Kiloran Bay. No footage was shot on Colonsay.

One of the most complex scenes shows the small boat battling the Corryvreckan whirlpool. This was a combination of footage shot at Corryvreckan between the Hebridean islands of Scarba and Jura, and Bealach a'Choin Ghlais (Sound of the Grey Dogs) between Scarba and Lunga.

- There are some long-distance shots looking down over the area, shot from one of the islands.
- There are some middle-distance and close-up shots that were made from a small boat with a hand-held camera.
- There were some model shots, done in the tank at the studio. These had gelatin added to the water so that it would hold its shape better and would look better when scaled up.
- The close-up shots of the people in the boat were all done in the studio, with a boat on gimbals being rocked in all directions by some hefty studio hands while others threw buckets of water at them. These were filmed with the shots made from the boat with the hand-held camera projected behind them.
- Further trickery joined some of the long- and middle-distance shots together with those made in the tank into a single frame.

Though much of the film was shot in the Hebrides, Livesey was not able to travel to Scotland because he was performing in a West End play, The Banbury Nose by Peter Ustinov, at the time of filming. Thus all his scenes were shot in the studio at Denham, and a double (coached by Livesey in London) was used in all of his scenes shot in Scotland. These were then mixed so that the same scene would often have a middle-distance shot of the double and then a closeup of Livesey, or a shot of the double's back followed by a shot showing Livesey's face.

The film was budgeted at £200,000 (equivalent to £7,500,000 in 2025) and went £30,000 over. The art department budget was £40,000, mostly spent on effects for the studio whirlpool. The actors received £50,000, of which one third went to Hiller.

Powell shot a scene at the end of the film where Catriona follows Torquil into the castle, to emphasise her love for him, but decided to cut it.

=== Music ===
John Laurie was the choreographer and arranger for the cèilidh sequences. The puirt à beul "Macaphee" was performed by Boyd Steven, Maxwell Kennedy and Jean Houston of the Glasgow Orpheus Choir. The song sung at the cèilidh that Torquil translates for Joan is a traditional Gaelic song "Ho ro, mo nighean donn bhòidheach", originally translated into English as "Ho ro My Nut Brown Maiden" by John Stuart Blackie in 1882. It is also played by three pipers marching toward Moy Castle at the start of the final scene. The film's other music is traditional Scottish and Irish songs and original music by Allan Gray.

=== Restoration ===
In 2023, the film was restored and scanned in 4K resolution, by the British Film Institute, The process was overseen by Martin Scorsese and Thelma Schoonmaker Powell.

== Locations ==
- On the Isle of Mull
  - Carsaig Bay – Carsaig Pier and boathouses; Carsaig House (Erraig); telephone box next to the waterfall, today a Historic Environment Scotland Category B listed building.
  - Moy Castle – Castle of Moy.
  - Duart Castle – Castle of Sorne.
  - Torosay Castle – Achnacroish.
- Pass of the Grey Dogs (56.202°N 5.690°W) – the whirlpool.
- Gulf of Corryvreckan (56.156°N 5.711°W) – the whirlpool.

== Reception ==
=== Box office ===
The film was a hit at the box office and recovered its cost in the UK alone.

=== U.S. release ===
The film was one of the first five movies from the Rank Organisation to receive a release in the U.S. under a new arrangement. The others were Caesar and Cleopatra, The Rake's Progress, Brief Encounter and The Wicked Lady. U.S. box office take was $1.2 million.

=== Critical reviews ===
Contemporary reviews were positive:

The Times wrote: "The cast makes the best possible use of some natural, unforced dialogue, and there is some glorious outdoor photography."

The Guardian stated "[It] has interest and integrity. It deserves to have successors."

The Monthly Film Bulletin wrote:

The great strength of this most entertaining film lies in its affectionate and sympathetic handling of the Highland setting: its great weakness lies in its story. The glimpses of Highland life, the dancing at the ceilidh, the gossip of travellers in a bus, the enthusiasm of the bird enthusiast (played by Captain Knight) with his eagle, all this is admirably done; and the storm, which is the climax of the film, is realistic and gripping. The story, however, does not bear reflective analysis. ...If the fundamental framework had been sound this could have been a first-rate film; it is in any case a piece of first-rate entertainment.

Raymond Chandler wrote in 1950, "I've never seen a picture which smelled of the wind and rain in quite this way nor one which so beautifully exploited the kind of scenery people actually live with, rather than the kind which is commercialised as a show place."

Martin Scorsese wrote in 1993, "I reached the point of thinking there were no more masterpieces to discover, until I saw I Know Where I'm Going!"

In 2012, the film critic Molly Haskell included it among her 10 greatest films of all time in that year's Sight & Sound poll.

In 2013, the film critic Barry Norman included it among his 49 greatest films of all time.

In 2025, FilmInk called it "one of the greatest romantic comedies of all time".

== Radio adaptation ==
Hiller appeared in a radio adaptation of the film, produced by the Australian Broadcasting Commission in 1947.

== Bibliography ==
- Cook, Pam (4 November 2002). I know where I'm going!. London: British Film Institute. ISBN 978-0-85170-814-0.
- Powell, Michael (1986). A Life in Movies (autobiography). London: Heinemann. ISBN 978-0-434-59945-5.
- Powell, Michael (1992). Million Dollar Movie (The second volume of his autobiography). London: Heinemann. ISBN 978-0-434-59947-9.
