= A Matter of Life and Death (1946 film) =

1946 film by Emeric Pressburger and Michael Powell

- Theatrical release poster
- Directed by: Michael Powell; Emeric Pressburger
- Written by: Michael Powell; Emeric Pressburger
- Produced by: Michael Powell; Emeric Pressburger
- Starring: David Niven; Roger Livesey; Raymond Massey; Kim Hunter; Marius Goring
- Cinematography: Jack Cardiff
- Edited by: Reginald Mills
- Music by: Allan Gray
- Production companies: The Archers; J. Arthur Rank
- Distributed by: Eagle-Lion Films
- Release dates: 1 November 1946 (UK premiere); 15 December 1946 (UK general)
- Running time: 104 minutes
- Country: United Kingdom
- Language: English
- Budget: £320,000 (est.) or £650,000 or £257,000
- Box office: $1,750,000 (US)

A Matter of Life and Death is a 1946 British fantasy romantic drama film written, produced and directed by Michael Powell and Emeric Pressburger.

Set in England during World War II, the film stars David Niven, Roger Livesey, Raymond Massey, Kim Hunter and Marius Goring. The film was originally released in the United States under the title Stairway to Heaven, which derived from the film's most prominent special effect: a broad escalator linking Earth to the afterlife. It has been considered one of the greatest films of all time.

== Plot ==
This is a story of two Worlds
the one we know and another which exists only in the mind of a young airman whose life & imagination have been violently shaped by war

Any resemblance to any other world known or unknown is purely coincidental.

— Opening scroll

In May 1945, Squadron Leader Peter Carter, a Royal Air Force pilot, is flying a badly damaged and burning Lancaster bomber over the English Channel after a mission over Germany. Carter is expecting to die, after ordering his crew to bail out without revealing to them that his own parachute has been destroyed. The only radio operator receiving him is June, at a United States Army Air Forces base on the coast of England. Carter converses with June before jumping from the Lancaster without a parachute.

Peter should have died at that point, but Conductor 71, the guide sent to escort him to the Other World, misses him in the thick fog over the Channel. The airman wakes up on a beach near June's base. At first, he assumes he is in the afterlife, but when a de Havilland Mosquito flies low overhead, he discovers to his bewilderment that he is still alive.

Peter meets June cycling back to her quarters after her night shift, and they fall in love. Conductor 71 stops time to explain the situation, urging Peter to accept his death and accompany him to the Other World, but Peter demands an appeal. While Conductor 71 consults his superiors, Peter continues to live. Conductor 71 returns and informs him that he has been granted his appeal and has three days to prepare his case. He can choose a defence counsel from among all the people who have ever died, but he has difficulty picking one.

Peter's visions are diagnosed by June's fascinated friend Dr Reeves as a symptom of a brain injury—chronic adhesive arachnoiditis from a slight concussion two years earlier—and he is scheduled for surgery. Reeves is killed in a motorcycle accident while trying to find the ambulance that is to take Peter to the hospital; this allows him to act as Peter's counsel.

Reeves argues that, through no fault of his own, his client was given additional time on Earth and that, during that time, he has fallen in love and now has an earthly commitment that should take precedence over the afterlife's claim on him. The matter comes to a head—in parallel with Peter's brain surgery—before a celestial court. The prosecutor is American Minuteman Abraham Farlan, who hates the British for making him the first casualty of the American War of Independence. Reeves challenges the composition of the jury, which is made up of representatives who are prejudiced against the British; the jury is replaced by a multicultural mixture of modern Americans whose origins are as varied as those they replace.

Reeves and Farlan both make comparisons with the other's nationality to support their positions. In the end, Reeves has June take the stand and prove that she genuinely loves Peter by telling her that the only way to save his life is to take his place, whereupon she steps onto the stairway to the Other World without hesitation and is carried away. The stairway then comes to an abrupt halt and June rushes back to Peter's open arms. As Reeves triumphantly explains, "... nothing is stronger than the law in the universe, but on Earth, nothing is stronger than love."

The jury rules in Peter's favour. The Judge shows Reeves and Farlan the new lifespan granted to the defendant; Reeves calls it "very generous", and Farlan jokingly complains, then agrees to it. The two then engage in supportive banter with one another, and against the stern Chief Recorder, who protests against the breach of law. In the operating room, the masked surgeon (whose face is revealed as that of the Judge) declares the difficult operation a success.

== Cast ==
- David Niven as Peter David Carter, squadron leader
- Roger Livesey as Dr Frank Reeves
- Raymond Massey as Abraham Farlan
- Kim Hunter as June
- Marius Goring as Conductor 71
- Abraham Sofaer as the Judge
- Robert Coote as Bob Trubshawe, (Note: "Trubshawe" was a name often given to minor characters in Niven's films at his insistence, as a back-handed tribute to his old army friend Michael Trubshawe.) flying officer
- Joan Maude as chief recorder
- Kathleen Byron as an angel
- Bonar Colleano as an American pilot
- Richard Attenborough as an English pilot
- Robert Atkins as the Vicar
- Bob Roberts as Dr Gaertler
- Edwin Max as Dr McEwan
- Betty Potter as Mrs Tucker, Reeves' housekeeper
- Robert Beatty as US crewman (uncredited)
- Robert Rietti as man on stairway (uncredited)
- Michael Trubshawe as himself (uncredited)

=== Cast notes ===
Marius Goring as Conductor 71 with David Niven as Peter Carter.

Goring was offered the role of Conductor 71, but insisted that he wanted to play Peter instead; however, Powell and Pressburger were set on Niven playing the part, and eventually told Goring that the Conductor was his only choice; if he turned it down, they would approach Peter Ustinov to play the part.

Powell and Pressburger went to Hollywood to cast the role of June with no possible actress in mind except, possibly, Betty Field, who was in a play in New York at the time. The suggestion of Kim Hunter came from Alfred Hitchcock, who had recently used her to read lines from behind the camera for Ingrid Bergman's screen test for Spellbound. Hunter had stage experience and had been under contract to producer David O. Selznick for two years. Powell and Pressburger decided that she was right for the part almost immediately on their first meeting, and arranged with Selznick to use her.

Michael Trubshawe was an old drinking buddy of Niven's and he was given a cameo in this picture by Niven.

== Production ==
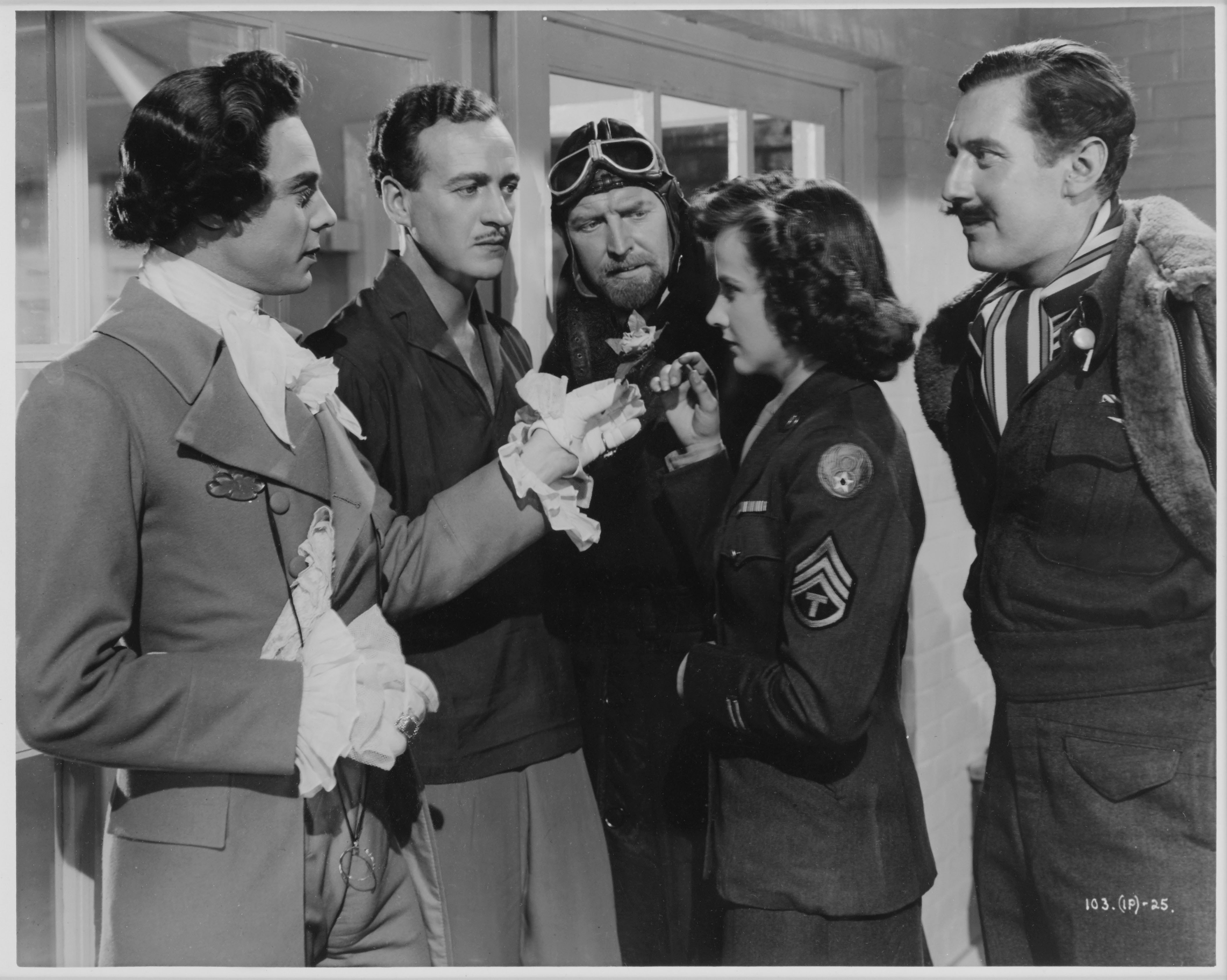
Goring, Niven, Livesey, Hunter & Coote production still

A Matter of Life and Death was filmed at D&P Studios and Denham Studios in Denham, Buckinghamshire, England, and on location in Devon and Surrey. The beach scene was shot at Saunton Sands in Devon, and the village seen in Dr Reeves' camera obscura was Shere in Surrey. Production took place from 2 September to 2 December 1945, used 29 sets, and cost an estimated £320,000, equivalent to £15.5 million in 2024.

A Matter of Life and Death had an extensive pre-production period due to the complexity of the production. The huge escalator linking this world with the other, called "Operation Ethel" by the firm of engineers who constructed it under the aegis of the London Passenger Transport Board, took three months to make and cost £3,000, equivalent to £145,000 in 2024. "Ethel" had 106 steps, each 20 feet (6.1 m) wide, and was driven by a 12 horsepower engine. The full shot was completed by hanging miniatures. It has been claimed that the noise of the machinery prevented recording the soundtrack live and all scenes with the escalator were dubbed in post-production; however, in an interview incorporated into the Carlton DVD release, cinematographer Jack Cardiff recalls his surprise that it operated completely silently.

The decision to film the scenes of the Other World in black and white added to the complications. They were filmed in three-strip Technicolor, but colour was not added during printing, giving a pearly hue to the black-and-white shots, a process cited in the screen credits as "Colour and Dye-Monochrome Processed in Technicolor". This reversed the effect in The Wizard of Oz. (Note: As Powell pointed out, we know that this world is in colour.) Photographic dissolves between "Technicolor Dye-Monochrome" (the Other World) and Three-Strip Technicolor (Earth) are used several times during the film. There was a nine-month wait for film stock and Technicolor cameras because they were being used by the US Army to make training films.

Other sequences also presented challenges, such as the stopped-action table-tennis game for which Hunter and Livesey were trained by champions Alan Brooke and Viktor Barna; the scene where Carter washes up on the beach, the first scene filmed, where cinematographer Jack Cardiff fogged up the camera lens with his breath to create the look he wanted; and the long, 25-minute trial sequence, which required a set with a 350-foot (110 m) long by 40-foot (12 m) high backcloth.

== Release ==
A Matter of Life and Death was chosen for the first ever Royal Film Performance on 1 November 1946 at the Empire Theatre, in London, in the presence of George VI and his wife. The performance was in aid of the Cinematograph Trade Benevolent Fund and £30,000 (£1.09 million in 2024 pounds) was raised. It then went into general release in the UK on 15 December 1946. The film subsequently had its US release in New York on 25 December 1946 under the name Stairway to Heaven.

According to trade papers, the film was a "notable box office attraction" at British cinemas in 1947.

In 1986, the film was screened out of competition at the Cannes Film Festival.

== Critical reception ==
Upon its premiere in New York City, Bosley Crowther said "the delicate charm, the adult humor and visual virtuosity of this Michael Powell—Emeric Pressburger film render it indisputably the best of a batch of Christmas shows...the wit and agility of the producers, who also wrote and directed the job, is given range through the picture in countless delightful ways: in the use, for instance, of Technicolor to photograph the earthly scenes and sepia in which to vision the hygienic regions of the Beyond (so that the heavenly 'messenger', descending, is prompted to remark, 'Ah, how one is starved for Technicolor up there!'.)"

According to a 2006 book, "A spate of movies appeared just after the ending of the Second World War, including It's a Wonderful Life (1946) and Stairway to Heaven (1946), perhaps tapping into so many people's experience of loss of loved ones and offering a kind of consolation."

In December 2017, a digitally restored version was shown in British cinemas. Kevin Maher, writing in The Times, said the restoration was "crisp" whilst describing the film as being a "definitive fantasy classic" and also as "essential viewing."

In 1999, A Matter of Life and Death was placed 20th on the British Film Institute's list of Best 100 British films. It ranked 90th in The Sight and Sound Greatest Films of All Time 2012 poll, regarded by some as the most authoritative in the world, and 78th in 2022.

== Preservation ==
The Academy Film Archive preserved A Matter of Life and Death in 1999. The film underwent a 4K restoration at Sony Pictures Entertainment for a 2018 Criterion Collection blu-ray release.

== Analysis ==
=== Title ===
According to Powell in his A Life in Movies, the United States was the only market in which the film's name was changed, except that most European countries used "A Question of Life and Death" rather than "A Matter of Life and Death". The American title, "Stairway to Heaven", was the idea of Arthur Krim and Robert Benjamin, two lawyers just starting out in the film business, who would be marketing the film in the US, and insisted that no film had ever done well there with the word "death" in the title. When Pressburger countered with the hit film Death Takes a Holiday, their response was to point out that it succeeded because the very fact that Death was on holiday meant that there would be no death in the film.

=== Carter's visions ===
The film's narrative does not clarify whether Carter's visions are real, or hallucinatory. The fact that the same actor plays the celestial judge and the brain surgeon tends to indicate that they are a hallucination. To ensure that Carter's symptoms – including his visions – were consistent with the diagnosis and treatment depicted, the filmmakers read and integrated a significant amount of medical research, according to Diane Broadbent Friedman.

Interpretations of Carter's visions of the "other world" as supernatural, within the context of the film's narrative, may be supported by elements of the plot. A key question, which is alluded to in the film's dialogue, concerns the unlikelihood of Carter surviving the fall from his aircraft. (Nevertheless, in a small number of historical cases, people have survived falling from a great height, without suffering serious injury or permanent disability.) Likewise, two scenes set in the other world take place without Carter, namely Trubshawe's arrival, and the prelude to the start of the trial. A third plot device, regarding a borrowed book, also seems to hint that the other world is real. However, these devices could all be explained as retrospective inventions of Carter's mind, while he is unconscious.

=== The other world ===
The producers took pains never to refer to "the other world" as Heaven, as they felt that was restrictive. However, in the first minutes of the film, a very young Richard Attenborough appears as a dead airman registering in the "other world" and asking: "It's heaven, isn't it?", while new arrivals are being measured for angel wings. This is followed by the "other world" female attendant commenting to Flying Officer Trubshawe that some people might think it would be "heaven to be a clerk". An introductory title screen – repeated as the foreword to the 1946 novelisation by Eric Warman – contains an explicit statement, however: "This is the story of two worlds, the one we know and another which exists only in the mind of a young airman whose life and imagination have been violently shaped by war", but goes on to say "Any resemblance to any other world known or unknown is purely coincidental".

The architecture of the other world is noticeably modernist. It features a vast and open plan, with huge circular observation holes, beneath which the clouds of Earth can be seen. This vision was later the inspiration for the design of St. Paul's Bus Station, Walsall in 2000, by architects Allford Hall Monaghan Morris. The film's amphitheatre court scene was rendered by BT in a TV advertisement c. 2002 as a metaphor for communication technology, especially the Internet.

=== Identities and significance of the statues ===
Lining the escalator are large statues (created by Eric Aumonier) of historically prominent men. A list of the names of the statues appears in Michael Powell's handwriting on pages 49 and 50 of the script.

They are:

- Alexander the Great
- Ludwig van Beethoven
- Frédéric Chopin
- Confucius
- Benjamin Franklin
- Julius Caesar
- Abraham Lincoln
- Michelangelo
- Muhammad (Note: Only the base of the statue of Muhammad can be seen.)
- Moses
- Bartolomé Esteban Murillo
- Plato
- Rembrandt
- Cardinal Richelieu (mentioned)
- William Shakespeare (mentioned)
- Solomon
- Jonathan Swift

Many of these have in common a characteristic beyond their prominence in politics, art and philosophy: in 1945 most were believed to have had epilepsy – as did John Bunyan, who is seen in the film serving as the conductor for Dr Reeves.

=== Anglo-American relations ===
The film was originally suggested by a British government department to improve relations between the Americans in the UK and the British public, following Powell and Pressburger's contributions to this sphere in A Canterbury Tale two years earlier, though neither film received any government funding nor input on plot or production. There was a degree of public hostility towards American servicemen stationed in the UK prior to the D-Day invasion of Europe. They were viewed by some as latecomers to the war and as "overpaid, oversexed and over here" by a public that had suffered three years of bombing and rationing, with many of their own men fighting abroad. The premise of the film is a simple inversion: the British pilot gets the pretty American woman rather than the other way round, and the only national bigotry – against the British – is voiced by the first American casualty of the American War of Independence. Raymond Massey, portraying an American, was a Canadian national at the time the film was made, but became a naturalised American citizen afterwards.

=== Chess ===
David Niven was a fan of chess. Peter and June play chess while they await Dr Reeves. Then Conductor 71 "borrows" a chess book Peter has accidentally knocked off the table, Alekhine's My Best Games of Chess 1924–1937. After the trial is won, Conductor 71 throws the book from the stairway; June finds it in his jacket pocket "to serve the 'was it a hallucination or did it really happen?' motif of the film", according to Mig Greengard. He also noted, "Lots of chess in movies past and present, but I can't recall another prominent appearance of a real chess book".

Ian Christie wrote, "the chess plot may also be of more significance than at first appears. The Conductor tries to tempt Peter by offering him the opportunity to pit his skill against the great chess masters, including Philidor; and he 'borrows' Alekhine's famous book, only to return it in an extraordinary transitional shot which introduces the final sequence of Peter waking up in hospital. As a token of Peter's life, the book tumbles from one photographic world to another within the same shot".

== Adaptations ==
=== Radio ===
The film was twice adapted for the American CBS Radio series Lux Radio Theatre, both with the title "Stairway to Heaven", starring Ray Milland on 27 October 1947 (episode 587) and featuring David Niven on 12 April 1955 (episode 918). The film was also adapted for the American NBC Radio series Screen Director's Playhouse series as "Stairway to Heaven", airing on 26 July 1951 and starring Robert Cummings and Julie Adams.

A two-part adaptation by Ben Cottam was broadcast on BBC Radio 4 14 and 21 October 2023. Produced and directed by Simon Barnard, the cast included Will Tudor as Peter, Lydia West as June, Geoffrey McGivern as Reeves, Miles Jupp as Administrator 48 and Jonny Weldon as Bob Trubshawe.

=== TV ===
An adaptation titled "Stairway to Heaven" aired as a live performance on the American television show Robert Montgomery Presents on 9 April 1951 on NBC, starring Richard Greene.

=== Theatre ===
The film was adapted as the musical Stairway to Heaven at the King's Head in Islington in November 1994. It was also made into a play by the Kneehigh Theatre for performances at the National Theatre in London, premiering in May 2007.

== In popular culture ==
- A short clip from the film (in which Peter Carter asks June her name) was shown briefly in the opening ceremony of the 2012 Summer Olympics during the "Frankie and June say...thanks Tim" segment (June is named for its protagonist).
- J. K. Rowling and Daniel Radcliffe, while discussing the near-death or afterlife scenes from Harry Potter and the Deathly Hallows – Part 2, said that the film was their favourite and was in mind by both when working on the scenes in Harry Potter.
- A classic image from the film was included in a 2014 set of postage stamps, "Great British Film", which honoured the nation's most iconic films.
- A sketch in the second series of the comedy sketch show Big Train gently lampoons the scenes in which Carter's character is conversing with June as his plane is stricken. In the sketch, June has several doomed airmen on the radio trying to get through at once (played by Kevin Eldon and Simon Pegg) and getting their lines crossed with each other.
- The title of A Matter of Loaf and Death, a 2008 British Wallace and Gromit short produced by Aardman Animations, is a pun on the title of the film.
- The ending scene of the 2011 Marvel Comics film Captain America: The First Avenger was inspired by A Matter of Life and Death.
- Bill & Ted's Bogus Journey (1991) contains a scene which utilises the original staircase. At the beginning of the sequence when Bill and Ted are addressing God, there are two statues at the base of the staircase. One is of Michael Powell and the other is of David Niven, an homage to A Matter of Life and Death.
- In the music video for the 1992 song Stay (Shakespears Sister song), the staircase that Siohban Fahey descends was inspired by the staircase in A Matter of Life and Death.
- The cover art for the international release of Phil Collins' 1990 single "Something Happened on the Way to Heaven", features a still from the pivotal operation scene.
- The 2020 Pixar film Soul depicts a stairway to the afterlife which is visually similar to the stairway in this film.
- The track "Louis XIV" from the 1991 album Queer by The Wolfgang Press is introduced by a sound sample of repartee between Dr Reeves as defence counsel and Abraham Farlan as prosecutor in the trial scene.

== See also ==
- BFI Top 100 British films
- List of films about angels
