= David Niven on screen, stage, radio, record and in print =

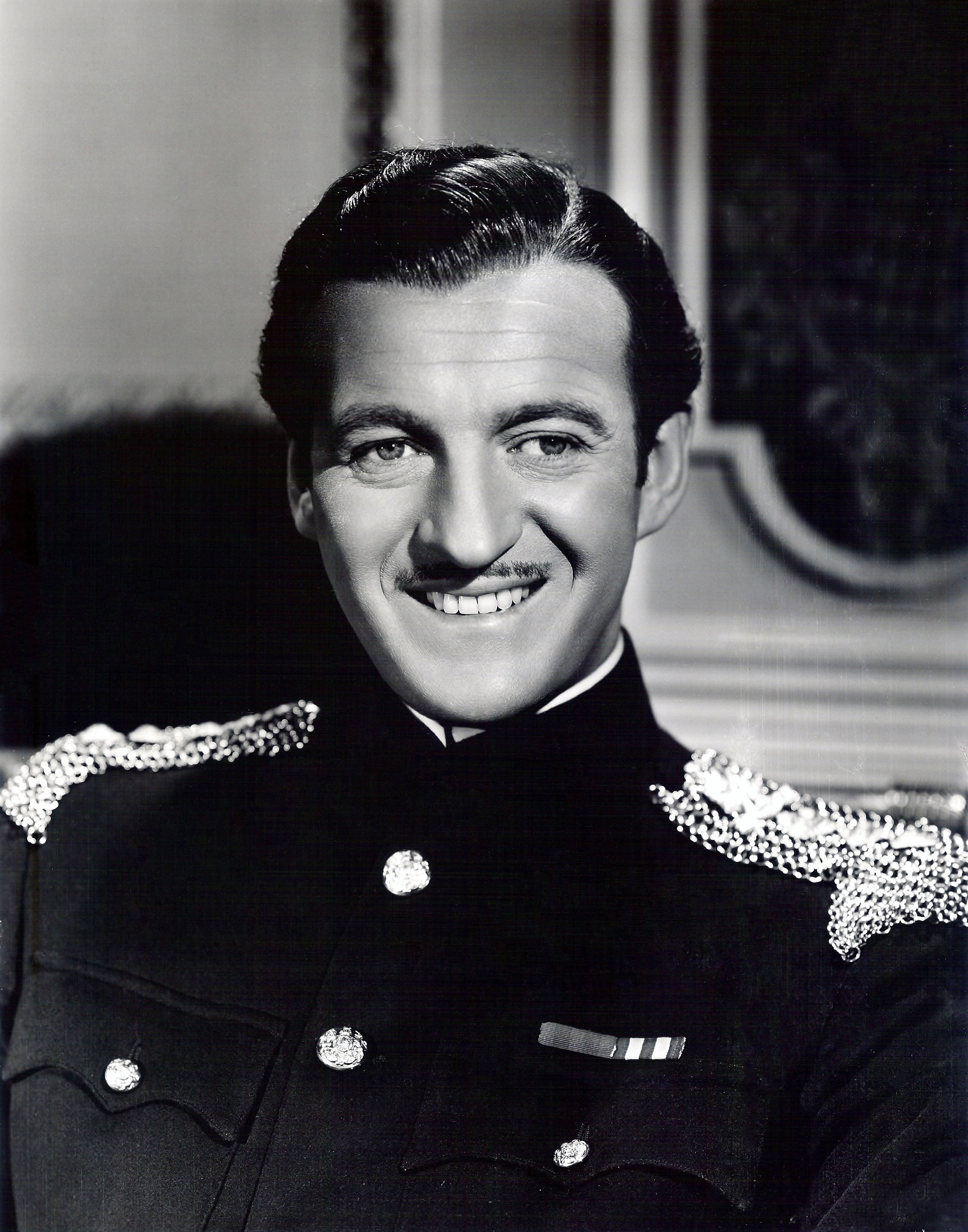
Niven in the 1948 film Enchantment

The British actor David Niven (1910–1983) performed in many genres of light entertainment, including film, television, radio, and theatre. He was the author of four books: two works of fiction and two autobiographies. Described by Brian McFarlane, writing for the British Film Institute (BFI), as being "of famously debonair manner", Niven's film career spanned from 1932 through 1983.

After brief spells as an army officer, whisky salesman and with a horse racing syndicate, he was an uncredited extra in his screen debut in There Goes the Bride; he went on to appear in nearly a hundred films. During his long career, he was presented with a Golden Globe Award for his part in The Moon Is Blue (1953) and was nominated for a BAFTA for the titular lead in Carrington V.C. (1955). He toplined the 1957 Academy Award winner for Best Picture, Around the World in 80 Days (1956 film), and two years later, for his role as Major Pollock in Separate Tables, Niven was awarded both the Best Actor Oscar and the Golden Globe for a performance where "the pain behind the fake polish was moving to observe". Niven's other notable works include The Charge of the Light Brigade (1936), The Dawn Patrol (1938), The Way Ahead (1944), The Bishop's Wife (1947), The Guns of Navarone (1961), the role of Sir Charles Lytton in The Pink Panther (and two of its sequels), Murder By Death, and most significantly, A Matter of Life and Death (1946), judged by the BFI as one of the top twenty British films of all time.

Niven lived more than 20 years of his life in the United States, although upon the outbreak of the Second World War, he returned to Britain to fight, and was re-commissioned a Lieutenant in the Highland Light Infantry. At the end of the war he returned to the US and continued his film work, but increasingly appeared on American radio and television, and later did the same in Britain. He appeared frequently in his Four Star Playhouse series, as well as producing some editions. For his years in both television and film, Niven was honoured with two stars on the Hollywood Walk of Fame. He died in 1983 from motor neurone disease at the age of 73.

== Filmography ==
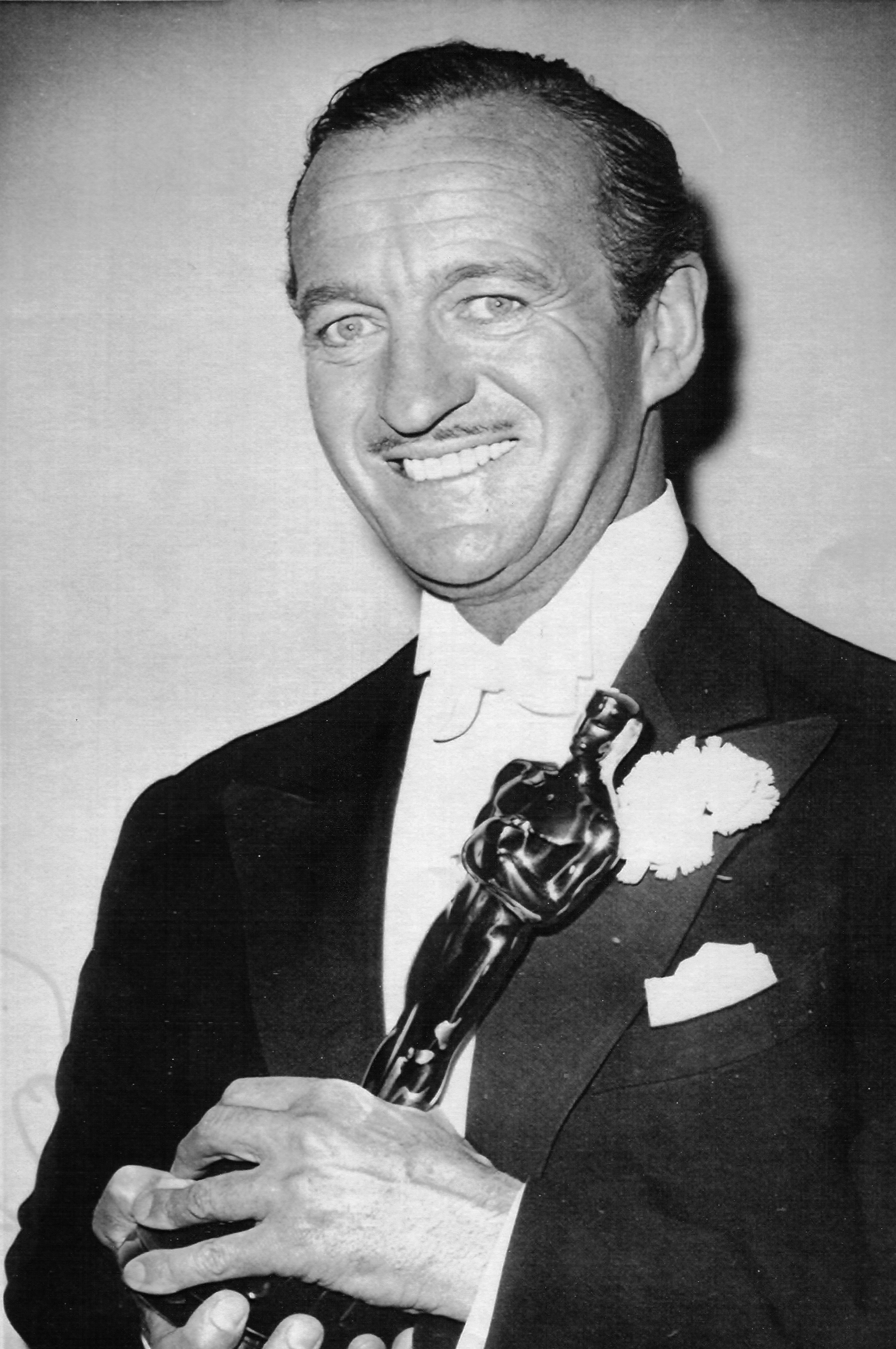
Niven won the Academy Award for Best Actor for the 1958 film Separate Tables

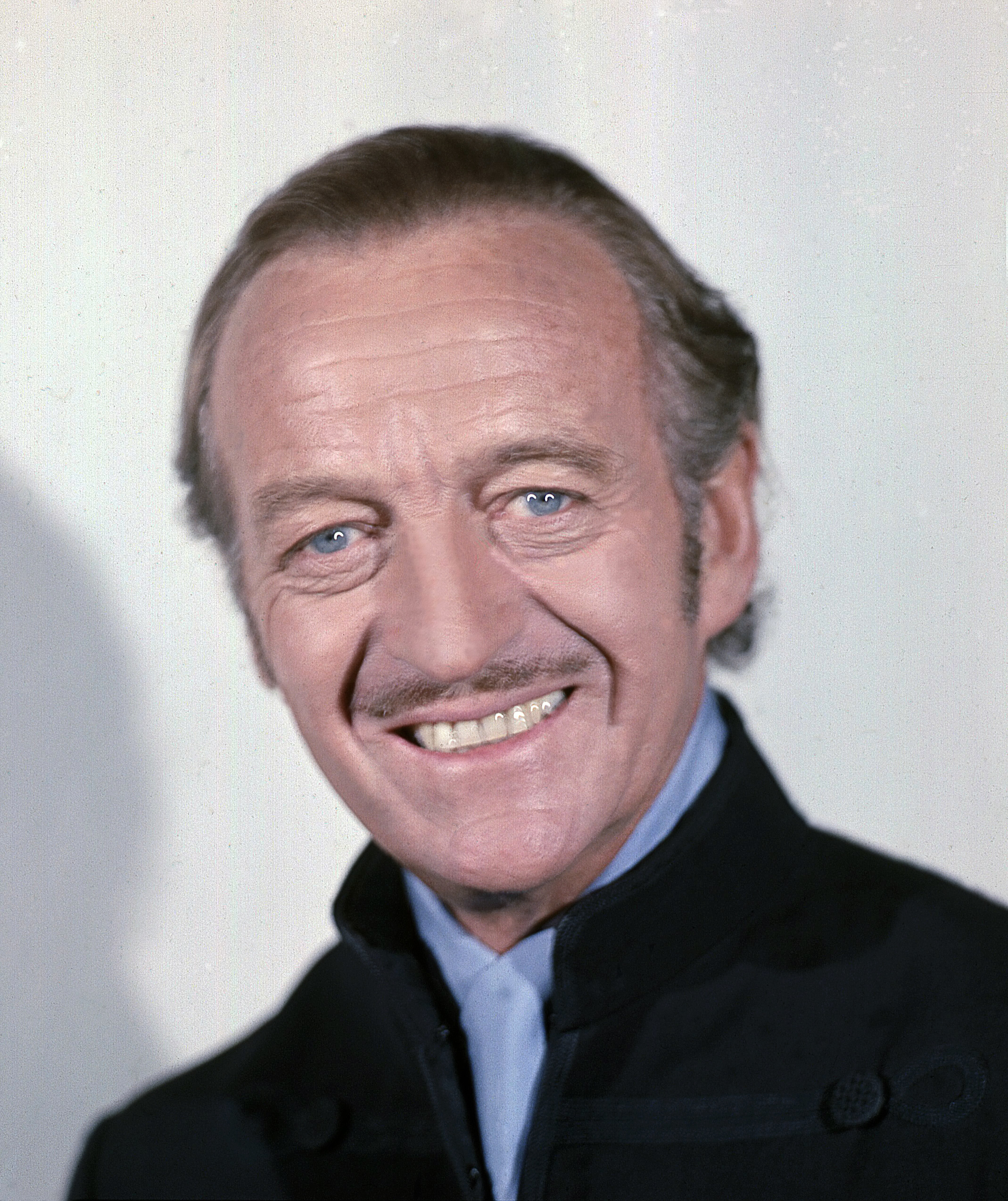
Niven, photographed in 1973 by Allan Warren

Filmography and awards of David Niven^{[1]}
| Year | Film | Role | Notes |
|---|---|---|---|
| 1932 | There Goes the Bride | Extra | Uncredited |
| 1933 | Eyes of Fate | Man at Race Course | Uncredited |
| 1934 | Cleopatra | Slave | Uncredited |
| 1934 | All the Winners | Extra | Uncredited |
| 1935 | Without Regret | Bill Gage | |
| 1935 | Barbary Coast | Cockney sailor | Uncredited |
| 1935 | A Feather in Her Hat | Leo Cartwright | |
| 1935 | Splendor | Clancey Lorrimore | |
| 1935 | Mutiny on the Bounty | Crewman | Uncredited |
| 1936 | Rose Marie | Teddy | |
| 1936 | Palm Springs | George Brittel | |
| 1936 | Dodsworth | Captain Clyde Lockert | |
| 1936 | Thank You, Jeeves! | Bertie Wooster | |
| 1936 | The Charge of the Light Brigade | Captain James Randall | |
| 1936 | Beloved Enemy | Gerald Preston | |
| 1937 | We Have Our Moments | Joe Gilling | |
| 1937 | The Prisoner of Zenda | Count Fritz von Tarlenheim | |
| 1937 | Dinner at the Ritz | Paul de Brack | |
| 1938 | Bluebeard's Eighth Wife | Albert de Regnier | |
| 1938 | Four Men and a Prayer | Christopher Leigh | |
| 1938 | Three Blind Mice | Steve Harrington | |
| 1938 | The Dawn Patrol | Lt. Scott | |
| 1939 | Wuthering Heights | Edgar Linton | |
| 1939 | Bachelor Mother | David Merlin | |
| 1939 | The Real Glory | Lt Terrence McCool | |
| 1939 | Eternally Yours | Tony "The Great Arturo" Halstead | |
| 1939 | Raffles | A.J. Raffles | |
| 1942 | The First of the Few | Geoffrey Crisp | |
| 1944 | The Way Ahead | Lt Jim Perry | |
| 1946 | A Matter of Life and Death | Peter David Carter | |
| 1946 | Magnificent Doll | Aaron Burr | |
| 1947 | The Perfect Marriage | Dale Williams | |
| 1947 | The Other Love | Dr Anthony Stanton | |
| 1947 | The Bishop's Wife | Henry Brougham | |
| 1948 | Bonnie Prince Charlie | Prince Charles Edward Stuart | |
| 1948 | Enchantment | General Sir Roland Dane | |
| 1949 | A Kiss in the Dark | Eric Phillips | |
| 1949 | A Kiss for Corliss | Kenneth Marquis | |
| 1950 | The Elusive Pimpernel | Sir Percy Blakeney | |
| 1950 | The Toast of New Orleans | Jacques Riboudeaux | |
| 1951 | Happy Go Lovely | B.G. Bruno | |
| 1951 | Soldiers Three | Captain Pindenny | |
| 1951 | Appointment with Venus | Major Valentine Morland | |
| 1952 | The Lady Says No | Bill Shelby | |
| 1953 | The Moon Is Blue | David Slater | Winner, Golden Globe Award for Best Actor – Musical or Comedy at the 11th Golden Globe Awards |
| 1954 | The Love Lottery | Rex Allerton | |
| 1954 | Happy Ever After | Jasper O'Leary | |
| 1955 | Carrington V.C. | Major Charles "Copper" Carrington, V.C. | Nominated, BAFTA Award for Best British Actor at the 8th British Academy Film Awards |
| 1955 | The King's Thief | Duke of Brampton | |
| 1956 | The Birds and the Bees | Colonel Patrick Henry Harris | |
| 1956 | The Silken Affair | Roger Tweakham | |
| 1956 | Around the World in 80 Days | Phileas Fogg | Winner, Academy Award for Best Picture at the 29th Academy Awards. |
| 1957 | Oh, Men! Oh, Women! | Dr. Alan Coles | |
| 1957 | The Little Hut | Henry Brittingham-Brett | |
| 1957 | My Man Godfrey | Godfrey Smith | Nominated, Golden Globe Award for Best Actor – Musical or Comedy at the 15th Golden Globe Awards |
| 1958 | Bonjour Tristesse | Raymond | |
| 1958 | Separate Tables | Major David Angus Pollock | Winner, Academy Award for Best Actor at the 31st Academy Awards; Golden Globe Award for Best Actor – Drama at the 16th Golden Globe Awards; New York Film Critics Circle Award for Best Actor at the 1958 Awards |
| 1959 | Ask Any Girl | Miles Doughton | |
| 1959 | Happy Anniversary | Chris Walters | |
| 1960 | Please Don't Eat the Daisies | Larry Mackay | |
| 1961 | The Guns of Navarone | Corporal John Anthony Miller | |
| 1962 | The Captive City | Major Peter Whitfield | Originally titled La Città Prigioniera |
| 1962 | The Best of Enemies | Major Richardson | Originally titled I Due Nemici |
| 1962 | The Road to Hong Kong | Lady Chatterley's Lover Lama | |
| 1962 | Guns of Darkness | Tom Jordan | |
| 1963 | 55 Days at Peking | Sir Arthur Robertson | |
| 1963 | The Pink Panther | Sir Charles Lytton | |
| 1964 | Bedtime Story | Lawrence Jamison | |
| 1965 | Where the Spies Are | Dr Jason Love | |
| 1965 | Lady L | Lord Dicky Lendale | |
| 1966 | Eye of the Devil | Philippe de Montfaucon | |
| 1967 | Casino Royale | Sir James Bond | |
| 1968 | Prudence and the Pill | Gerald Hardcastle | |
| 1968 | The Impossible Years | Jonathan Kingsley | |
| 1969 | Before Winter Comes | Major Giles Burnside | |
| 1969 | The Brain | Colonel Carol "The Brain" Matthews | Originally titled Le Cerveau |
| 1969 | The Extraordinary Seaman | Lt. Commander Finchhaven | |
| 1971 | The Statue | Alex Bolt | |
| 1972 | King, Queen, Knave | Charles Dreyer | Originally titled Herzbube |
| 1974 | The Canterville Ghost | Ghost | |
| 1974 | Vampira | Count Dracula | |
| 1975 | Paper Tiger | Walter Bradbury | |
| 1975 | The Remarkable Rocket | Narrator | |
| 1976 | No Deposit, No Return | J. W. Osborne | |
| 1976 | Murder by Death | Dick Charleston | |
| 1977 | Candleshoe | Priory | |
| 1978 | Death on the Nile | Colonel Johnny Race | |
| 1979 | A Nightingale Sang in Berkeley Square | Ivan/General Bernard Drew | |
| 1979 | Escape to Athena | Professor Blake | |
| 1980 | Rough Cut | Chief Inspector Cyril Willis | |
| 1980 | The Sea Wolves | Colonel Bill Grice | |
| 1982 | Trail of the Pink Panther | Sir Charles Lytton | Voice dubbed by Rich Little |
| 1983 | Better Late Than Never | Nicholas Cartland | |
| 1983 | Curse of the Pink Panther | Sir Charles Lytton | Voice dubbed by Rich Little; posthumous release |

- ^1 This list also includes film specific awards and nominations won by Niven, but not the career awards, which consisted of:

- the 1959 Louella O. Parsons' Golden Apple Award for Most Cooperative Male Star;
- the Alexander Walker Special Award, won at the 1980 Evening Standard British Film Awards.

== Stage credits ==
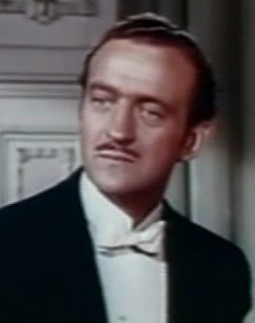
Niven in the 1950 musical The Toast of New Orleans

Stage credits of David Niven
| Date | Production | Theatre | Role | Notes |
|---|---|---|---|---|
| 1935 | The Wedding | Pasadena Playhouse, Pasadena, CA | | One performance only |
| 5 December 1951 – 12 January 1952 | Nina | Royale Theatre, New York | Gerard | 45 performances |
| 8 July – October 1952 | The Moon is Blue | United Nations Theatre | David Slater | |

== Radio broadcasts ==
Radio broadcasts of David Niven
| Date | Broadcast | Channel | Notes |
|---|---|---|---|
| 16 July 1936 | Shell Chateau | NBC | |
| 11 January 1937 | Lux Radio Theatre: "The Gilded Lily" | NBC | |
| 10 March 1938 | In the British Army | NBC | |
| 17 November 1938 | The Rudy Vallée Show | NBC | |
| 21 May 1939 | The Chase and Sanborn Hour | NBC | |
| 11 June 1939 | Radio Tribute to the King and Queen of England | | |
| 24 September 1939 | The Chase and Sanborn Hour | NBC | |
| 22 October 1939 | Silver Theater: "Ex Spy" | NBC | |
| 7 November 1939 | The Walter O'Keefe Show | ABC Radio | |
| 17 July 1943 | Bob Hope Entertains the Troops | | |
| 24 March 1943 | Sealtest Variety Theater | NBC | |
| 17 December 1945 | Information Please | NBC | |
| 1 September 1946 | The Hour of Mystery | ABC Radio | |
| 10 February 1947 | Lux Radio Theatre: "Frenchman's Creek" | CBS | |
| 17 May 1947 | This is Hollywood | CBS | |
| 26 June 1947 | Hi Jinx! | NBC | |
| 9 November 1947 | Hollywood Hotel | ABC Radio | |
| 26 February 1948 | Kraft Music Hall | NBC | |
| 9 May 1948 | Hollywood Star Preview | | |
| 17 February 1949 | Mary Margaret McBride Program | NBC | |
| 3 March 1949 | Hallmark Playhouse: "Berkeley Square" | CBS | |
| 24 March 1949 | Screen Guild Players: "Enchantment" | CBS | As General Sir Roland Dane in adaptation of Enchantment |
| 23 June 1949 | Screen Guild Players: "Stairway to Heaven" | CBS | As Peter Carter in adaptation of A Matter of Life and Death |
| 27 August 1949 | NBC University Theatre: "Nineteen Eighty-Four" | NBC | As Winston Smith in adaptation of Nineteen Eighty-Four |
| 8 October 1949 | Anacin Hollywood Start Theater: "Next Door to Yesterday" | | |
| 16 October 1949 | Hollywood Watch | | |
| 27 October 1949 | Camel Screen Guild Theater: "A Kiss in the Dark" | CBS | As Eric Phillips in adaptation of A Kiss in the Dark |
| 13 November 1949 | Theater Guild on the Air: "Brief Encounter" | CBS | |
| 19 December 1949 | Lux Radio Theatre: "The Bishop's Wife" | CBS | As Henry Brougham in adaptation of The Bishop's Wife |
| 15 October 1950 | Theater Guild on the Air: "I Know Where I'm Going" | CBS | |
| 25 February 1951 | The Hedda Hopper Show | ABC Radio | |
| 23 September 1951 | Theater Guild on the Air: "This Woman Business" | CBS | |
| 25 September 1951 | Philip Morris Playhouse on Broadway: "Brief Encounter" | | |
| 27 January 1952 | Theater Guild on the Air: "The Thief" | CBS | |
| 27 April 1952 | Screen Guild Theater: "Bluebeard's Eighth Wife" | CBS | |
| 1 May 1952 | Hallmark Playhouse: "Lorna Doone" | | |
| 4 May 1952 | Theater Guild on the Air: "Dear Brutus" | CBS | |
| 14 May 1952 | The Bing Crosby Show | CBS | |
| 1 June 1952 | Hollywood Star Theater | | |
| 8 June 1952 | Hollywood Star Theater: "The Long Shot" | | |
| 5 March 1954 | The Bob Hope Show | NBC | |
| 15 March 1954 | The Bob Hope Show | NBC | |
| 4 November 1954 | The Bob Hope Show | NBC | |
| 3 March 1955 | The Bob Hope Show | NBC | |
| 3 April 1955 | Lux Radio Theatre: "Stairway to Heaven" | CBS | As Peter Carter in adaptation of A Matter of Life and Death |
| 22 February 1960 | Please Don't Eat the Daisies | | |
| 22 July 1971 | Weekend Woman's Hour | BBC Radio 4 | |
| 8 August 1973 | Kaleidoscope | BBC Radio 4 | |
| 9 March 1974 | David Niven | BBC Radio 4 | |
| 23 February 1975 | The Fred Astaire Story | BBC Radio 2 | |
| 5 March 1975 | Noël: The Life and Times of Noël Coward | BBC Radio 4 | |
| 26 March 1973 | The Fred Astaire Story | BBC Radio 2 | |
| 23 April 1975 | The Fred Astaire Story | BBC Radio 2 | |
| 23 September 1975 | David Niven | BBC Radio 2 | |
| 15 February 1977 | Kaleidoscope | BBC Radio 4 | |
| 26 April 1977 | Desert Island Discs | BBC Radio 4 | |
| 29 July 1981 | John Dunn Show | BBC Radio 2 | |

== Television ==
Television appearances of David Niven^{[1]}
| Date | Programme | Channel | Role | Notes |
|---|---|---|---|---|
| 5 October 1950 | Nash Airflyte Theater: "Portrait of Lydia" | CBS | | Adapted from a work by A.A. Milne |
| 5 October 1951 | Schlitz Playhouse of Stars: "Not a Chance" | CBS | | |
| 10 February 1952 | What's My Line? | CBS | Himself (mystery celebrity guest) | |
| 20 February 1952 | Celanese Theater: "The Petrified Forest" | ABC | | Adapted from a play by Robert E. Sherwood |
| 2 May 1952 | The Jack Benny Program: "The David Niven Story" | CBS | | |
| 27 October 1952 | Robert Montgomery Presents: "The Sheffield Story" | NBC | | |
| 4 December 1952 | Four Star Playhouse: "South Sea Doctor" | CBS | | |
| 15 December 1952 | Hollywood Opening Night: "Sword Play" | NBC | | |
| 15 January 1953 | Four Star Playhouse: "Man on a train" | CBS | William Langford | Niven also produced this episode. |
| 12 March 1953 | Four Star Playhouse: "No Identity" | CBS | | |
| 7 May 1953 | Four Star Playhouse: "Night Ride" | CBS | | |
| 4 June 1953 | Four Star Playhouse: "Mr. Bingham" | CBS | | |
| 24 September 1953 | Four Star Playhouse: "Finale" | CBS | | |
| 29 October 1953 | Four Star Playhouse: "A Matter of Advice" | CBS | | |
| 26 November 1953 | Four Star Playhouse: "For Art's Sake" | CBS | | |
| 17 December 1953 | Four Star Playhouse: "A Man of the World" | CBS | | |
| 18 February 1954 | Four Star Playhouse: "The Bomb" | CBS | | |
| 11 March 1954 | Four Star Playhouse: "Operation in Money" | CBS | | |
| 1 April 1954 | Four Star Playhouse: "The Book" | CBS | | |
| 22 April 1954 | Four Star Playhouse: "Village in the City" | CBS | | |
| 7 October 1954 | Four Star Playhouse: "Never Explain" | CBS | | |
| 24 October 1954 | Light's Diamond Jubilee: "The Girls in Their Summer Dresses" | ABC, CBS, NBC, and DuMont | | |
| 11 November 1954 | Four Star Playhouse: "Vote of Confidence" | CBS | | |
| 2 December 1954 | Four Star Playhouse: "Meet a Lonely Man" | CBS | | |
| 23 December 1954 | Four Star Playhouse: "The Answer" | CBS | Deacon | Niven also produced this episode; Nominated, Emmy Award for Best Actor in a Single Performance at the 7th Primetime Emmy Awards |
| 6 January 1955 | The Star and the Story: "The Thin Line" | CBS | | |
| 20 January 1955 | Four Star Playhouse: "Breakfast in Bed" | CBS | | |
| 24 February 1955 | Four Star Playhouse: "Tusitala" | CBS | Robert Louis Stevenson | |
| 17 March 1955 | Four Star Playhouse: "Henry and the Psychopathic Horse" | CBS | | |
| 7 April 1955 | Four Star Playhouse: "The Collar" | CBS | | |
| 5 May 1955 | Four Star Playhouse: "Uncle Fred Flits By" | CBS | Uncle Fred | Niven also produced this episode; adapted from a P.G. Wodehouse story |
| 2 June 1955 | Four Star Playhouse: "Broken Journey" | CBS | | |
| 6 October 1955 | Four Star Playhouse: "Firing Squad" | CBS | | |
| 27 October 1955 | Four Star Playhouse: "Full Circle" | CBS | Maxwell | |
| 17 November 1955 | Four Star Playhouse: "Here Comes the Suit" | CBS | | |
| 19 January 1956 | Four Star Playhouse: "Tunnel of Fear" | CBS | Jerry Larkin | Niven also produced this episode. |
| 9 February 1956 | Four Star Playhouse: "Safe Keeping" | CBS | | |
| 8 March 1956 | Four Star Playhouse: "Red Wine" | CBS | Wilson | |
| 4 April 1956 | Four Star Playhouse: "The Rites of Spring" | CBS | | |
| 26 April 1956 | Four Star Playhouse: "Touch and Go" | CBS | | |
| 14 October 1956 | What's My Line? | CBS | Himself | |
| 21 October 1956 | What's My Line? | CBS | Himself | |
| 14 June 1956 | Four Star Playhouse: "Second Chance" | CBS | | |
| 15 March 1957 | Dick Powell's Zane Grey Theatre: "Village of Fear" | CBS | Allen Raikes | |
| 31 August 1957 | This is Scotland | Scottish Television | | Opening night of Scottish Television |
| 27 September 1957 | Mr. Adams and Eve: "Taming of the Shrew" | CBS | Himself | Niven also portrayed Phineas Fogg during the episode. |
| 7 October 1957 | Alcoa Theatre: "Circumstantial" | NBC | | |
| 21 September 1958 | What's My Line? | CBS | Himself | |
| 28 September 1958 | What's My Line? | CBS | Himself | |
| 28 October 1957 | Alcoa-Goodyear Theatre: "Danger By Night" | NBC | | |
| 13 January 1958 | Alcoa Theatre: "In the Dark" | NBC | | |
| 10 February 1958 | Alcoa Theatre: "Night Caller" | NBC | | |
| 21 April 1958 | Alcoa Theatre: "My Wife's Next Husband" | NBC | | |
| 30 October 1958 | Dick Powell's Zane Grey Theater: "The Accused" | CBS | | |
| 25 January 1959 | What's My Line? | CBS | Himself | |
| 13 December 1959 | What's My Line? | CBS | Himself | |
| 3 January 1960 | What's My Line? | CBS | Himself | |
| 11 January 1960 | The June Allyson Show: "The Trench Coat" | CBS | | |
| 21 January 1960 | Dick Powell's Zane Grey Theater: "Wayfarers" | CBS | | As director |
| 24 November 1960 | Close-Up: "Location Story of The Guns of Navarone" | ITV | | Interviewee |
| 22 January 1963 | The Dick Powell Show: "Everybody Loves Sweeney" | NBC | | |
| 12 February 1963 | The Dick Powell Show: "Luxury Liner" | NBC | | |
| 19 February 1963 | The Dick Powell Show: "Apples Don't Fall Far" | NBC | | |
| 2 April 1963 | The Dick Powell Show: "Epilogue" | NBC | | |
| 2 April 1964 | Academy Awards Presentation | ABC | | Host |
| 1964–1965 | The Rogues | NBC | Alec Fleming | 10 episodes |
| 1967 | All Eyes on Sharon Tate | | Himself | Interviewee |
| 30 March 1971 | Scotland Yard | NBC | | Narrator |
| 9 October 1971 | Aquarius | ITV | | Interviewee |
| 1972 | Personal View: David Niven | | | |
| 14 October 1972 | Parkinson | BBC1 | | |
| 25 April 1973 | Survival Special: "The Forbidden Desert of the Danaki" | ITV | | Narrator |
| 28 May 1974 | The Bluffers | NBC | | Narrator |
| 26 February 1975 | The British Screen Awards | BBC1 | | |
| 10 March 1975 | Bell System Family Theatre: "The Canterville Ghost" | NBC | Sir Simon de Canterville | |
| 20 September 1975 | Parkinson | BBC1 | | |
| 24 December 1975 | Survival Special: "Safari by Balloon" | ITV | | Narrator |
| 1976 | David Niven's World | | | Narrator |
| 8 January 1976 | Film Night: "David Niven" | BBC2 | | |
| 29 February 1976 | Survival Special: "The Family That Lives With Elephants" | ITV | | Narrator |
| 23 September 1976 | Looks Familiar | ITV | | |
| 1977 | The Billion Dollar Movies | | | |
| 11 August 1977 | The Hollywood Greats: "Errol Flynn" | BBC1 | | |
| 10 August 1978 | The Hollywood Greats: "Ronald Colman" | BBC1 | | |
| 22 December 1978 | Survival Special: "The Leopard That Changed Its Spots" | ITV | | Narrator |
| 20 – 22 May 1979 | A Man Called Intrepid | NBC | | |
| 26 December 1980 | Survival Special: "Penguin Islands" | ITV | | Narrator |
| 1981 | Portrait of a Great Lady | | | |
| 18 April 1981 | The AFI Life Achievement Award: Salute To Fred Astaire | CBS | | Niven hosted the AFI Life Achievement Award given to Fred Astaire |
| 3 October 1981 | Parkinson | BBC1 | | |

- ^1 This list also includes programme-specific nominations for Niven, but not the career nominations, which consisted of the 1956 Emmy Award for Best Continuing Performance by an Actor in a Dramatic Series for his work in the Four Star Playhouse series.

== Books ==
Books by David Niven
| Year | Title | Genre | Publisher | Ref. |
|---|---|---|---|---|
| 1951 | Round the Rugged Rocks | Novel | London: Cresset Press | |
| 1972 | The Moon's a Balloon | Autobiography | London: Hamilton | |
| 1975 | Bring on the Empty Horses | Autobiography | London: Hamilton | |
| 1981 | Go Slowly, Come Back Quickly | Novel | London: Hamilton | |

== Discography ==
Album recordings by David Niven
| Year | Album | Ref. |
|---|---|---|
| 1952 | The Second Elizabeth | |
| 1977 | David Niven: The Moon's a Balloon | |
| 1979 | The Enchanted Orchestra | |
| 1980 | Bring on the Empty Horses | |

== Bibliography ==
- Fowler, Karin J. (1995). David Niven: A Bio-Bibliography. Westport, CT: Greenwood Publishing Group. ISBN 978-0-313-28044-3.
- Garrett, Gerard (1975). The Films of David Niven. London: LSP Books. ISBN 0-85321-069-1.
- Lord, Graham (2003). Niv: The Authorised Biography of David Niven. London: Orion Publishing Group. ISBN 0-7528-5306-6.
- Morley, Sheridan (2004). "Niven, (James) David Graham (1910–1983)". Oxford Dictionary of National Biography (online ed.). Oxford University Press. doi:10.1093/ref:odnb/31503. (Subscription, Wikipedia Library access or UK public library membership required.)
