= Hjördis Genberg =

Swedish actress and model (1919–1997)

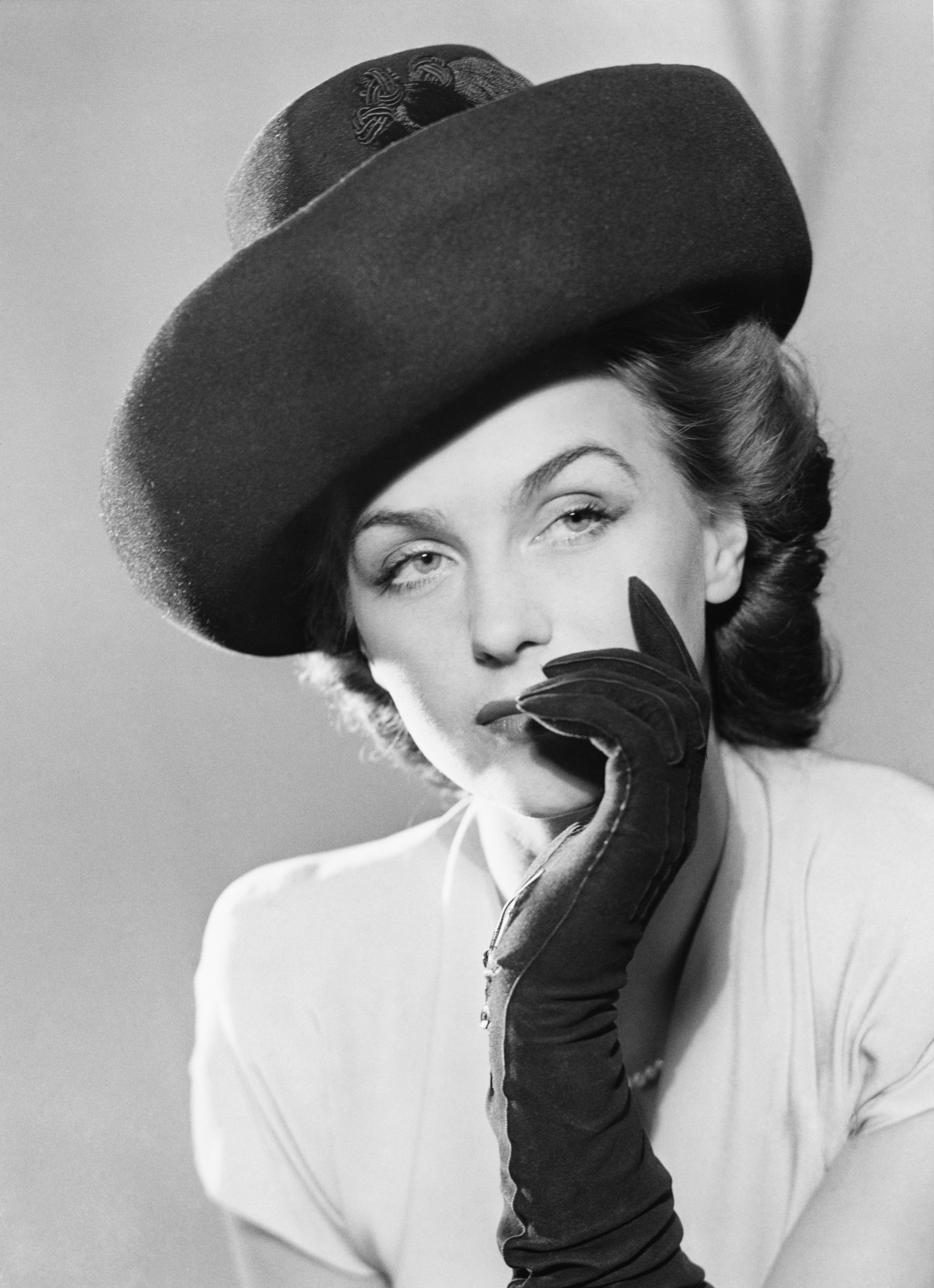
- Fashion photograph of Genberg taken by Erik Holmén in 1943.
- Born: 10 November 1919; Åsarna, Sweden
- Died: 24 December 1997 (aged 78); Céligny, Switzerland
- Occupations: Model, actress
- Spouses: Carl-Gustav Tersmeden (m. 1946; div. 1947) David Niven (m. 1948; died 1983)
- Children: 2

Hjördis Paulina Genberg (10 November 1919 – 24 December 1997) was a Swedish actress and model. She was the second wife of English actor and author David Niven. Genberg was among the first supermodels of Sweden.

== Life ==
Hjördis Genberg was born on 10 November 1919 in Åsarna, Jämtland County, Sweden. She was the fourth of five children of Gerda Paulina (née Hägglund) and Johan Georg Genberg. Genberg attended high school in the nearby Salsåker, a small town in Nordingrå.

In 1943, she made her breakthrough as an actress in the film Sjätte skottet (The Sixth Shot).

She married the businessman Carl-Gustav Tersmeden in 1946. They divorced in 1947.

In January 1948, Genberg married British actor David Niven, with whom she adopted two daughters, Kristina and Fiona Niven. According to friends, the relationship between Niven and Hjördis was turbulent.

After 35 years of marriage, Niven died on 29 July 1983 in Château-d’Œx, Switzerland, of ALS.

In 1994, tabloid newspapers linked her with Prince Rainier of Monaco; however a spokesperson for Rainier said no marriage was in the plans.

Hjördis Genberg died of a brain bleed at age 78 in Céligny, Switzerland on 24 December 1997. Her ashes were scattered in the Mediterranean Sea.

== Filmography (selection) ==
- 1943: Sjätte skottet
- 1943: Fångad av en röst
- 1945: Brita i grosshandlarhuset
- 1945: 13 stolar

== In popular culture ==
- Niven, David (2005-04-28). The Moon's a Balloon. Penguin UK. ISBN 978-0-14-193734-2.
- Niven, David (2009-01). Bring on the Empty Horses. Little, Brown Book Group Limited. ISBN 978-1-4055-0597-0.
- Lord, Graham (2004-12-14). NIV: The Authorized Biography of David Niven. St. Martin's Press. ISBN 978-0-312-32863-4.
- Munn, Michael (2014-07-10). David Niven: The Man Behind the Balloon. Aurum Press. ISBN 978-1-78131-372-5.

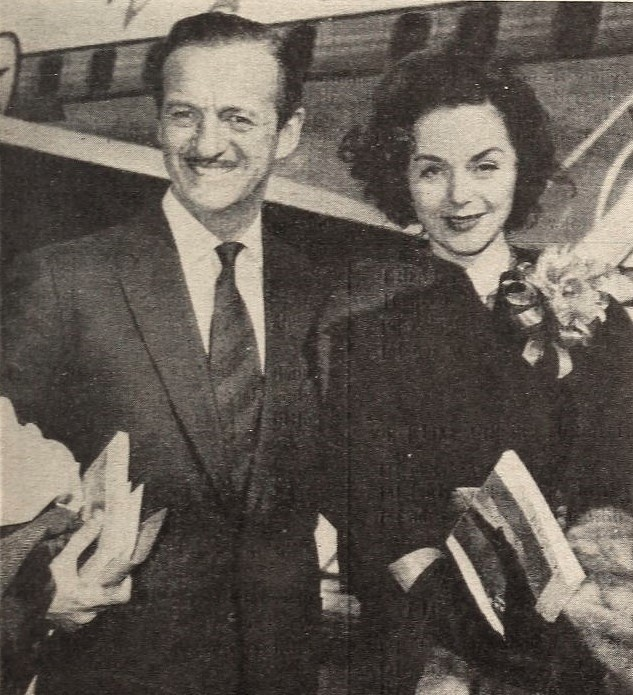
Hjördis Genberg with her husband David Niven, 1960
