= David Niven =

English actor, memoirist and novelist (1910–1983)

Lieutenant Colonel David Niven
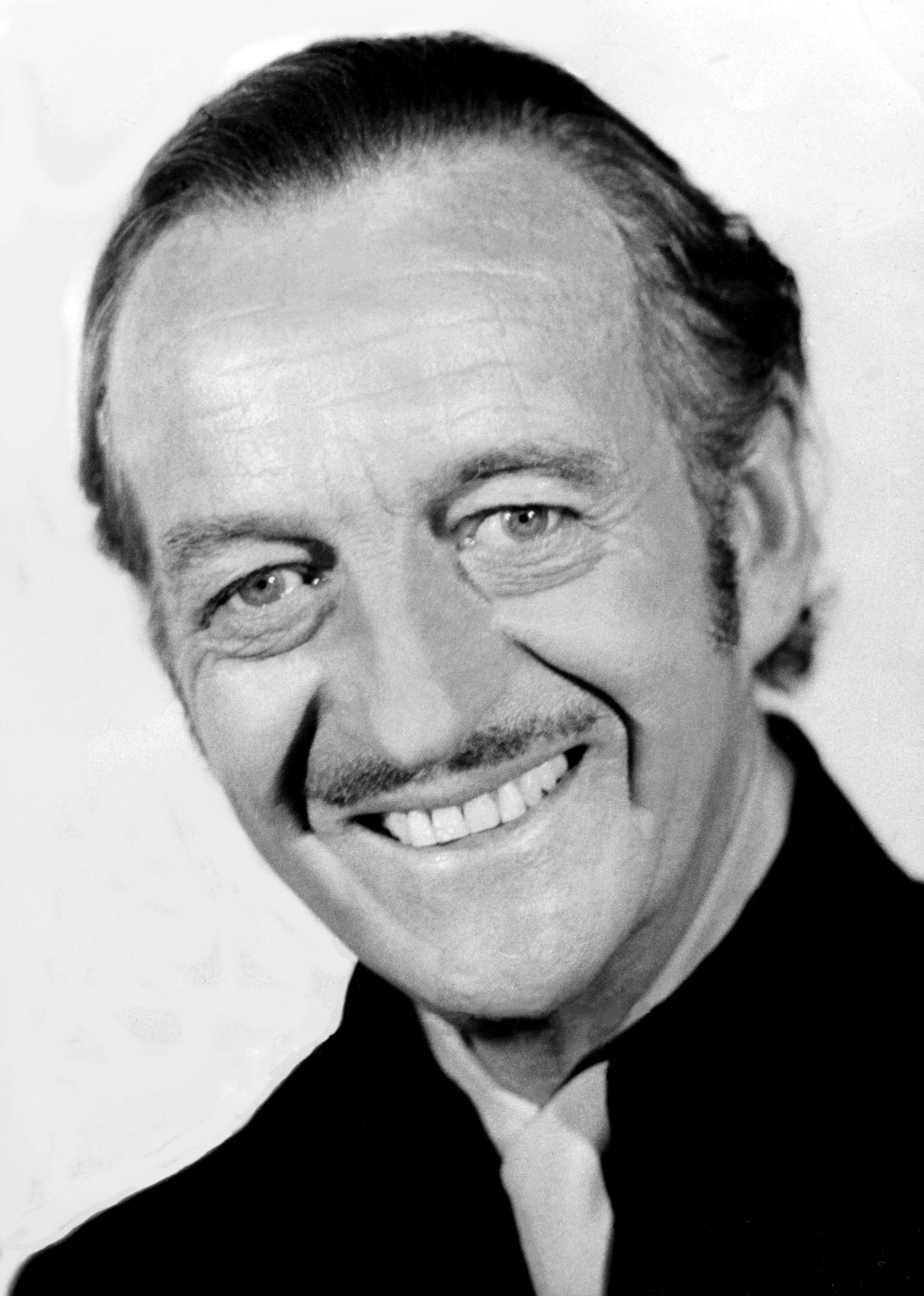
- Niven in 1973
- Born: James David Graham Niven; 1 March 1910; Victoria, London, England
- Died: 29 July 1983 (aged 73); Château-d'Œx, Switzerland
- Resting place: Château-d'Œx Cemetery
- Education: Heatherdown Preparatory School; Stowe School; Royal Military College, Sandhurst
- Occupations: Actor; soldier; memoirist; novelist
- Years active: 1932–1983
- Notable work: Full list
- Spouses: Primula Susan Rollo (m. 1940; died 1946) Hjördis Genberg (m. 1948)
- Children: 4, including David Jr.
- Military career
- Allegiance: United Kingdom
- Branch: British Army
- Service years: 1930–1933; 1940–1945
- Rank: Lieutenant colonel
- Service number: 44959
- Units: Highland Light Infantry; Rifle Brigade (Prince Consort's Own)
- Conflicts: Second World War
- Awards: Legion of Merit (United States)

James David Graham Niven (/ˈnɪvən/; 1 March 1910 – 29 July 1983) was an English actor, soldier, raconteur, memoirist and novelist. Niven was known as a handsome and debonair leading man in classic Hollywood films. His accolades include an Academy Award and two Golden Globe Awards in addition to nominations for a BAFTA Award and two Emmy Awards.

Born in central London to an upper-middle-class family, Niven attended Heatherdown Preparatory School and Stowe School before gaining a place at the Royal Military College, Sandhurst. After Sandhurst, he was commissioned as a second lieutenant in the Highland Light Infantry. Upon developing an interest in acting, he found a role as an extra in the British film There Goes the Bride (1932). Bored with the peacetime army, he resigned his commission in 1933, relocated to New York, then travelled to Hollywood. There, he hired an agent and had several small parts in films through 1935, including a non-speaking role in Metro-Goldwyn-Mayer's Mutiny on the Bounty (1935). This helped him gain a contract with Samuel Goldwyn.

Parts, initially small, in major motion pictures followed, including Dodsworth (1936), The Charge of the Light Brigade (1936), and The Prisoner of Zenda (1937). By 1938, he was starring as a leading man in films such as Wuthering Heights (1939). Upon the outbreak of the Second World War, Niven returned to Britain and rejoined the army, being recommissioned as a lieutenant. In 1942, he co-starred in the morale-building film about the development of the renowned Supermarine Spitfire fighter plane, The First of the Few (1942).

Niven went on to receive the Academy Award for Best Actor for his role in Separate Tables (1958), for which he holds the record of shortest winning performance in that category (at 23 minutes and 39 seconds). His other notable films during this time period include A Matter of Life and Death (1946), The Bishop's Wife (1947), Enchantment (1948), The Elusive Pimpernel (1950), The Moon Is Blue (1953), Around the World in 80 Days (1956), My Man Godfrey (1957), The Guns of Navarone (1961), Murder by Death (1976), and Death on the Nile (1978). He also earned acclaim and notoriety playing Sir Charles Lytton in The Pink Panther (1963) and James Bond in Casino Royale (1967).

== Early life and family ==
James David Graham Niven was born on 1 March 1910 at Belgrave Mansions, Grosvenor Gardens, London, to William Edward Graham Niven (1878–1915) and his wife, Henrietta Julia (née Degacher) Niven (1878–1932). He was named David after his birth on St David's Day. Niven later claimed he was born in Kirriemuir, in the Scottish county of Angus in 1909, but his birth certificate disproves this. He had two older sisters and a brother: Margaret Joyce Niven (1900–1981), Henry Degacher Niven (1902–1953), and the sculptor Grizel Rosemary Graham Niven (1906–2007), who created the bronze sculpture Bessie that is presented to the annual winners of the Women's Prize for Fiction.

Niven's father, William Niven, was of Scottish descent; he was killed in the First World War serving with the Berkshire Yeomanry during the Gallipoli campaign on 21 August 1915. He is buried in Green Hill Cemetery, Turkey, in the Special Memorial Section in Plot F. 10. Niven's paternal great-grandfather and namesake, David Graham Niven, (1811–1884) was from St Martins, a village in Perthshire. A physician, he married in Worcestershire, and lived in Pershore.

Niven's mother, Henrietta, was born in Brecon, Wales. Her father was Captain (brevet Major) William Degacher (1841–1879) of the 1st Battalion, 24th Regiment of Foot, who was killed at the Battle of Isandlwana during the Anglo-Zulu War in 1879. Although born William Hitchcock, in 1874, he and his older brother Lieutenant Colonel Henry Degacher (1835–1902), both followed their father, Walter Henry Hitchcock, in taking their mother's maiden name of Degacher. Henrietta's mother was Julia Caroline Smith, the daughter of Lieutenant General James Webber Smith CB.

After her husband's death in Turkey in 1915, Henrietta Niven remarried in London in 1917 to Conservative politician and diplomat Sir Thomas Walter Comyn-Platt (1869–1961). David and his sister Grizel were close, and both loathed Comyn-Platt. The family moved to Rose Cottage in Bembridge on the Isle of Wight after selling their London home. In his 1971 memoir, The Moon's a Balloon, Niven wrote fondly of his childhood home:

It became necessary for the house in London to be sold and our permanent address was now as advertised—a cottage which had a reputation for unreliability. When the East wind blew, the front door got stuck and when the West wind blew, the back door could not be opened—only the combined weight of the family seemed to keep it anchored to the ground. I adored it and was happier there than I had ever been, especially because, with a rare flash of genius, my mother decided that during the holidays she would be alone with her children. Uncle Tommy [Comyn-Platt] was barred—I don't know where he went—to the Carlton Club I suppose.

Literary editor and biographer, Graham Lord, wrote in Niv: The Authorised Biography of David Niven, that Comyn-Platt and Niven's mother may have been in an affair well before her husband's death in 1915 and that Comyn-Platt was actually Niven's biological father, a supposition that had some support among Niven's siblings. In a review of Lord's book, Hugh Massingberd from The Spectator stated photographic evidence did show a strong physical resemblance between Niven and Comyn-Platt that "would appear to confirm these theories, though photographs can often be misleading." Niven is said to have revealed that he knew Comyn-Platt was his real father a year before his own death in 1983.

After his mother remarried, Niven's stepfather had him sent away to boarding school. In The Moon's a Balloon, Niven described the bullying, isolation, and abuse he endured as a six-year-old. He said that older pupils would regularly assault younger boys, while the schoolmasters were not much better. Niven wrote of one sadistic teacher:

Mr Croome, when he tired of pulling ears halfway out of our heads (I still have one that sticks out almost at right-angles thanks to this son of a bitch) and delivering, for the smallest mistake in Latin declension, backhanded slaps that knocked one off one's bench, delighted in saying, 'Show me the hand that wrote this'—then bringing down the sharp edge of a heavy ruler across the offending wrist.

Years later, after joining the British Army, a vengeful Niven decided to return to the boarding school to pay a call on Mr Croome but he found the place abandoned and empty.

While attending school – as was customary for the time – Niven received many instances of corporal punishment owing to his inclination for pranks. It was this behaviour that finally led to his expulsion from his next school, Heatherdown Preparatory School, at the age of 10 1/2. This ended his chances for Eton College, a significant blow to his family. After failing to pass the naval entrance exam because of his difficulty with maths, Niven attended Stowe School, a newly created public school led by headmaster J. F. Roxburgh, who was unlike any of Niven's previous headmasters. Thoughtful and kind, he addressed the boys by their first names, allowed them bicycles, and encouraged and nurtured their personal interests. Niven later wrote, "How he did this, I shall never know, but he made every single boy at that school feel that what he said and what he did were of real importance to the headmaster."

In 1928, while she was on holiday in Bembridge, 15-year-old Margaret Whigham (the future socialite and Duchess of Argyll) had a sexual encounter with 18-year-old Niven, resulting in her pregnancy. Furious, her father rushed her to a London nursing home for a secret abortion. "All hell broke loose," remembered Elizabeth Duckworth, the Whigham family cook. Margaret Whigham adored Niven until the day he died; she was among the VIP guests at his London memorial service in 1983.

== Career ==
=== Military service ===
From 1928, Niven attended the Royal Military College, Sandhurst. He did well at Sandhurst, which gave him the "officer and gentleman" bearing that was his trademark. He requested assignment to the Argyll and Sutherland Highlanders or the Black Watch (Royal Highland Regiment), then jokingly wrote on the form, as his third choice, "anything but the Highland Light Infantry" (because that regiment wore tartan trews rather than the kilt). Having completed his training, he was commissioned as a second lieutenant in the British Army on 30 January 1930, and assigned to the Highland Light Infantry (HLI). He served with them for two years in Malta and then for a few months in Dover. In Malta, he became friends with the maverick Michael Trubshawe, and served under Roy Urquhart, future commander of the British 1st Airborne Division. On 21 October 1956, in an episode of the game show What's My Line?, Niven, as a member of the celebrity panel, was reacquainted with one of his former enlisted men. Alexander McGeachin was a guest and when his turn in the questioning came up, Niven asked, "Were you in a famous British regiment on Malta?" After McGeachin affirmed that he was, Niven quipped, "Did you have the misfortune to have me as your officer?" At that point, Niven had a brief but pleasant reunion.

Niven grew tired of the peacetime army. Though promoted to lieutenant on 1 January 1933, he saw no opportunity for further advancement. His ultimate decision to resign came after a lengthy lecture on machine guns, which was interfering with his plans for dinner with a particularly attractive young lady. At the end of the lecture, the speaker (a major general) asked if there were any questions. Showing the typical rebelliousness of his early years, Niven asked, "Could you tell me the time, sir? I have to catch a train."

Lieutenant Niven resigned his commission on 6 September 1933.

=== Film career ===
==== 1935–1938: Early roles ====
When Niven presented himself at Central Casting, he learned that he needed a work permit to reside and work in the United States. Since this required leaving the US, he went to Mexico, where he worked as a "gun-man", cleaning and polishing the rifles of visiting American hunters. He received his resident alien visa from the American consulate when his birth certificate arrived from Britain. He returned to the US and was accepted by Central Casting as "Anglo-Saxon Type No. 2,008." Among the initial films in which he can be seen are Barbary Coast (1935) and Mutiny on the Bounty (1935). He secured a small role in A Feather in Her Hat (1935) at Columbia before returning to Metro-Goldwyn-Mayer for a bit role, billed as David Nivens, in Rose Marie (1936).

Niven's role in Mutiny on the Bounty brought him to the attention of independent film producer Samuel Goldwyn, who signed him to a contract and established his career. For Goldwyn, Niven again had a small role in Splendor (1935). He was lent to MGM for a minor part in Rose Marie (1936), then a larger one in Palm Springs (1936) for Paramount Pictures. His first sizable role for Goldwyn came in Dodsworth (1936). In that same year he was again loaned out, to 20th Century Fox to play Bertie Wooster in Thank You, Jeeves! (1936), before landing a significant role as a soldier in The Charge of the Light Brigade (1936) at Warner Brothers, an Imperial adventure film starring his housemate at the time, Errol Flynn. Niven was fourth billed in Beloved Enemy (1936) for Goldwyn, supporting Merle Oberon with whom he was romantically involved. Universal Pictures used him in We Have Our Moments (1937) and he had a good supporting role in David O. Selznick's The Prisoner of Zenda (1937).

==== 1938–1939: Leading man ====
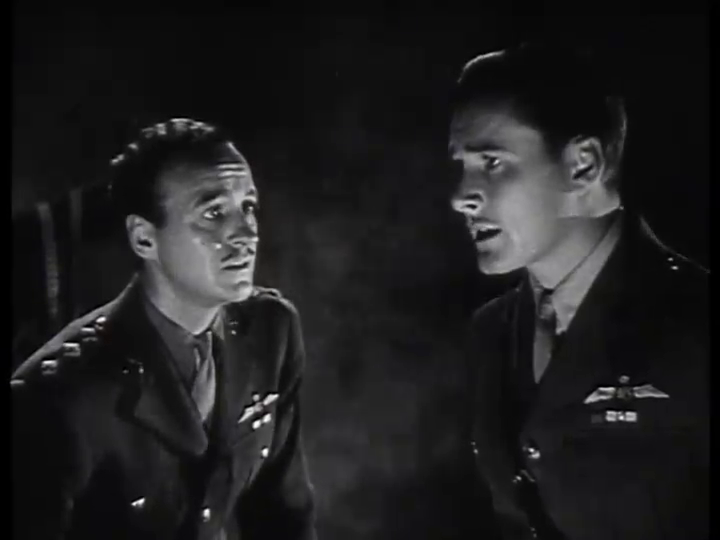
With Errol Flynn in The Dawn Patrol (1938)

Fox Studios gave him the lead in a B picture, Dinner at the Ritz (1938), and he again had a supporting role in Bluebeard's Eighth Wife (1938) directed by Ernst Lubitsch at Paramount. Niven was one of the four heroes in John Ford's Four Men and a Prayer (1938), also with Fox. He remained with Fox to play the part of a fake love interest in Three Blind Mice (1938). Niven joined what became known as the Hollywood Raj, a group of British actors in Hollywood which included Gladys Cooper, Cedric Hardwicke, Boris Karloff, Stan Laurel, Basil Rathbone, Ronald Colman, Leslie Howard, and C. Aubrey Smith.

Niven graduated to star parts in "A" films with The Dawn Patrol (1938) remake at Warners; although he was billed below Flynn and Rathbone, it was a leading role and the film did excellent business. Niven was reluctant to take part in Wuthering Heights (1939) for Goldwyn, but eventually relented and the film was a big success. RKO borrowed him to play Ginger Rogers's leading man in the romantic comedy Bachelor Mother (1939), which was another big hit. Goldwyn used him to support Gary Cooper in the adventure tale The Real Glory (1939), and Walter Wanger cast him opposite Loretta Young in Eternally Yours (1939). Finally, Goldwyn granted Niven a lead part in a major film, the title role as the eponymous gentleman safecracker in Raffles (1939).

==== 1939–1945: Second World War ====
The day after Britain declared war on Germany in 1939, Niven returned home and rejoined the British Army. He was alone among British stars in Hollywood in doing so; the British Embassy advised most actors to stay.

Niven was recommissioned as a lieutenant in the Rifle Brigade (Prince Consort's Own) on 25 February 1940, and was assigned to a motor training battalion. He wanted something more exciting, however, and transferred to the Commandos. He was assigned to a training base at Inverailort House in the Western Highlands. Niven later claimed credit for bringing future Major General Sir Robert Laycock to the Commandos. Niven commanded "A" Squadron GHQ Liaison Regiment, better known as "Phantom". He was promoted to war-substantive captain on 18 August 1941.

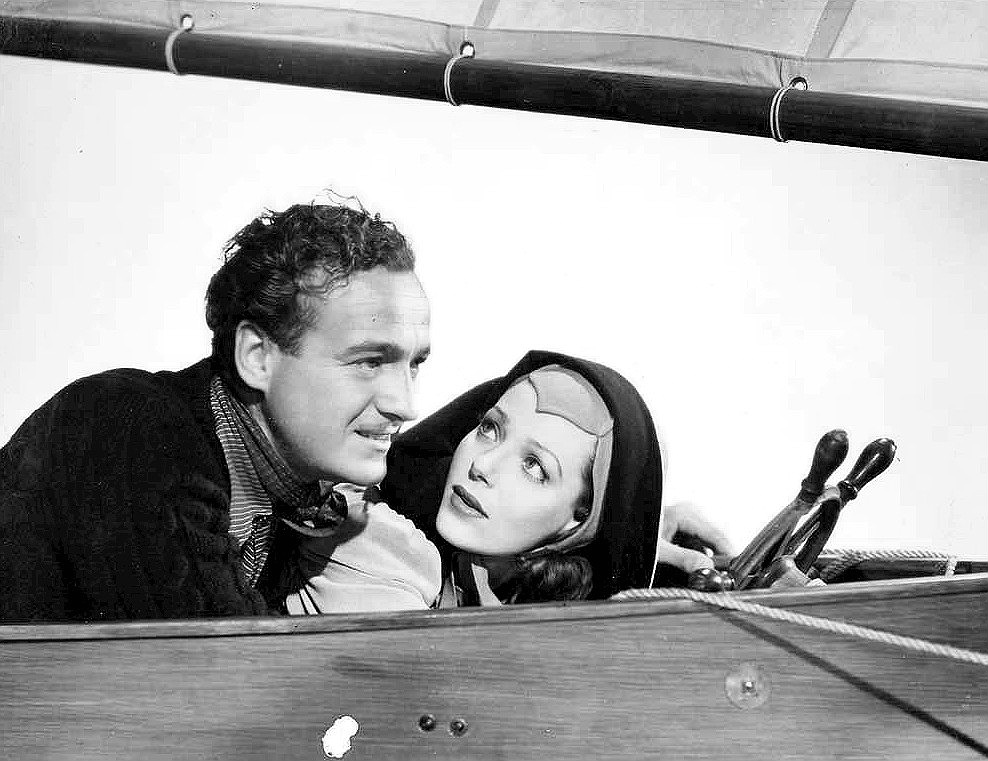
With Loretta Young in Eternally Yours (1939)

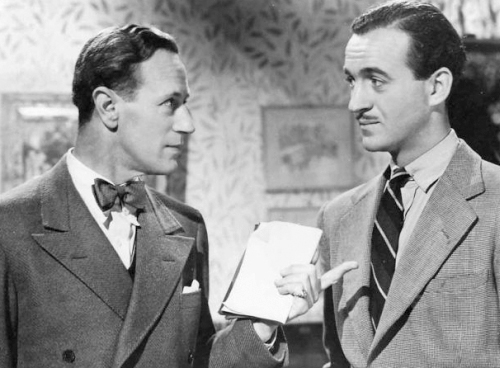
With Leslie Howard in The First of the Few (1942)

Niven also worked with the Army Film and Photographic Unit. His work included a small part in the deception operation that used minor actor M. E. Clifton James to impersonate General Sir Bernard Montgomery. During his work with the AFPU, Peter Ustinov, one of the scriptwriters, had to pose as Niven's batman. Niven explained in his autobiography that there was no military way that he, a lieutenant-colonel, and Ustinov, who was only a private, could associate, other than as an officer and his subordinate, hence their strange "act". In 1978, Niven and Ustinov starred together in a film adaptation of Agatha Christie's Death on the Nile.

He acted in two wartime films not formally associated with the AFPU, but both made with a firm view to winning support for the British war effort, especially in the United States. These were The First of the Few (1942), directed by Leslie Howard, and The Way Ahead (1944), directed by Carol Reed, the latter of which included a large supporting role for Ustinov.

Niven was also given a significant if largely unheralded role in the creation of SHAEF's military radio efforts conceived to provide entertainment to British, Canadian, and American forces in England and in Europe. In 1944 he worked extensively with the BBC and SHAEF to expand these broadcast efforts. He also worked extensively with Major Glenn Miller, whose Army Air Force big band, formed in the US, was performing and broadcasting for troops in England. Niven played a role in the operation to move the Miller band to France before Miller's December 1944 disappearance while flying over the English Channel.

On 14 March 1944, Niven was promoted war-substantive major (temporary lieutenant-colonel). He took part in the Allied invasion of Normandy in June 1944, although he was sent to France several days after D-Day. He served in "Phantom", a secret reconnaissance and signals unit which located and reported enemy positions, and kept rear commanders informed on changing battle lines. Niven was posted at one time to Chilham in Kent.

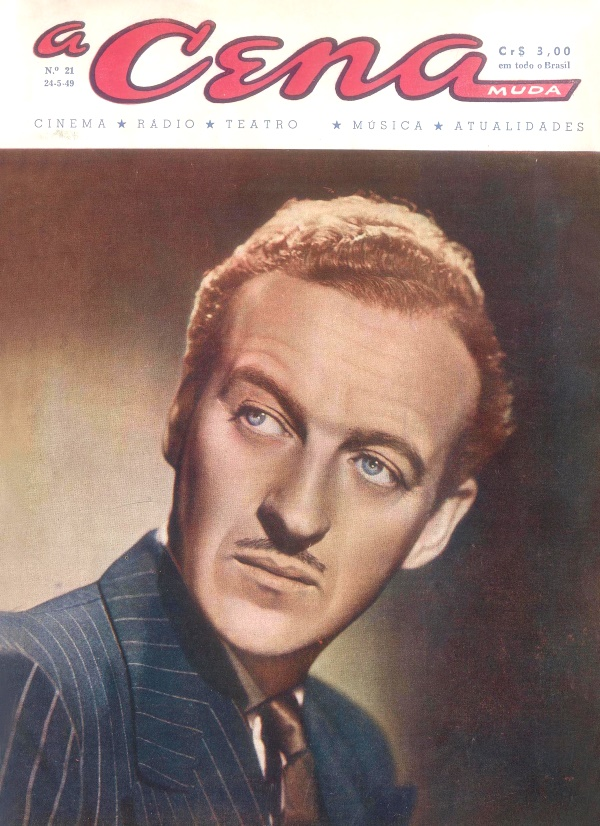
Niven in 1949

Niven had particular scorn for those newspaper columnists covering the war who typed out self-glorifying and excessively florid prose about their meagre wartime experiences. Niven stated, "Anyone who says a bullet sings past, hums past, flies, pings, or whines past, has never heard one – they go crack!" He gave a few details of his war experience in his autobiography, The Moon's a Balloon: his private conversations with Winston Churchill, the bombing of London, and what it was like entering Germany with the occupation forces. Niven first met Churchill at a dinner party in February 1940. Churchill singled him out from the crowd and stated, "Young man, you did a fine thing to give up your film career to fight for your country. Mark you, had you not done so it would have been despicable."

A few stories have surfaced. About to lead his men into action, Niven eased their nervousness by telling them, "Look, you chaps only have to do this once. But I'll have to do it all over again in Hollywood with Errol Flynn!" Asked by suspicious American sentries during the Battle of the Bulge who had won the World Series in 1943, he answered, "Haven't the foggiest idea, but I did co-star with Ginger Rogers in Bachelor Mother!"

Niven ended the war as a lieutenant-colonel. On his return to Hollywood after the war, he received the Legion of Merit, an American military decoration in honour of Niven's work setting up the BBC Allied Expeditionary Forces Programme, a radio news and entertainment station for the Allied forces.

==== 1946–1950: Postwar career ====
Niven initially resumed his acting career in England, taking the lead in the classic, A Matter of Life and Death (1946), from the team of Powell and Pressburger. The film was critically acclaimed, popular in England, and selected as the first Royal Film Performance. Niven returned to Hollywood but soon encountered tragedy with the death of his wife after falling down a flight of stairs at a party, and it was around this time that his career began to suffer as well. Goldwyn lent him to Universal to play Aaron Burr in Magnificent Doll (1946) opposite Ginger Rogers, then lent him to Paramount for The Perfect Marriage (1947) with Loretta Young and loaned him out a third time for Enterprise Productions' The Other Love (1947) opposite Barbara Stanwyck. Finally he was cast in a top picture for Goldwyn when he joined Cary Grant and Loretta Young for The Bishop's Wife (1947).

Any prospects for career advancement were quickly dashed when Goldwyn lent him to Alexander Korda to return to the UK for the title role in Bonnie Prince Charlie (1948), a notorious flop. Back in Hollywood, Niven was in Goldwyn's well-regarded Enchantment (1948) with Teresa Wright. At Warner Bros he was in the comedy A Kiss in the Dark (1948) with Jane Wyman, then he appeared opposite Shirley Temple in the comedy A Kiss for Corliss (1949). None of these films was successful at the box office. Niven's career was markedly in decline.

He returned to Britain for the title role in The Elusive Pimpernel (1950) from Powell and Pressberger, which was to have been financed by Korda and Goldwyn. Goldwyn pulled out and the film did not appear in the US for three years. Niven had a long, complex relationship with Goldwyn, who gave him his start, but Niven's demands for more money and better roles led to a long estrangement.

==== 1951–1964: Renewed acclaim ====
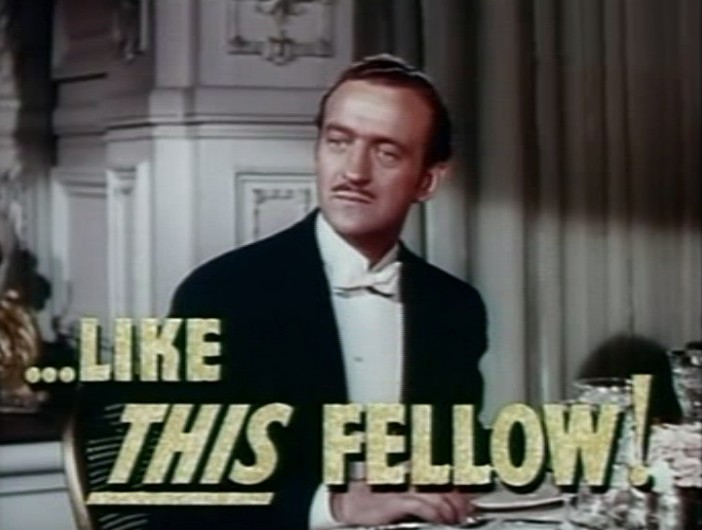
In The Toast of New Orleans (1950) trailer

In his post-Goldwyn years, it took Niven some time to return to the top of the Hollywood ladder. Foundering, he supported Mario Lanza in a musical at MGM, The Toast of New Orleans (1950). He then went to England to star in a musical with Vera-Ellen, Happy Go Lovely (1951); it was little seen in the US but a big hit in Britain. He was reduced to a support role in MGM's Soldiers Three (1951) not unlike some of the assignments early in his career. Niven had a far better part in the British war film Appointment with Venus (1952), which was popular in England. The Lady Says No (1952) was a poorly received American comedy. Niven tried Broadway, appearing opposite Gloria Swanson in Nina (1951–52). The play ran for only 45 performances but it was seen by Otto Preminger, who decided to cast Niven in the film version of The Moon Is Blue (1953). As preparation Preminger, who had directed the play in New York, insisted that Niven appear on stage in the West Coast run. The Moon Is Blue, a sex comedy, became notorious when it was released without a Production Code Seal of Approval; it was a major hit, and Niven won a Golden Globe Award for his role.

Back in demand, Niven's next few films were made in England: The Love Lottery (1954), an Ealing comedy; Carrington V.C. (1954), a drama that earned Niven a BAFTA nomination for Best Actor; and Happy Ever After (1954), a comedy with Yvonne de Carlo, which was hugely popular in Britain. In Hollywood, he was seen as the villain in an MGM swashbuckler, The King's Thief (1955), opposite a young Roger Moore. He had a better part in The Birds and the Bees (1956), portraying a conman in a remake of The Lady Eve (1941), in which Niven played a third-billed supporting role under American television comedian George Gobel and leading lady Mitzi Gaynor. Niven also appeared in the British romantic comedy The Silken Affair (1956) with Geneviève Page the same year.

Niven's professional fortunes were fully restored when he starred as Phileas Fogg in Around the World in 80 Days (1956), a huge hit at the box office and his signature film; it won the Academy Award for Best Picture. He followed it with Oh, Men! Oh, Women! (1957); The Little Hut (1957), from the writer of The Moon is Blue and another success at the box office; My Man Godfrey (1957), a screwball comedy; and Bonjour Tristesse (1958), for Preminger. Niven also worked in television. He appeared several times on various short-drama shows and was one of the "four stars" of the dramatic anthology series Four Star Playhouse, appearing in 33 episodes. The show was produced by Four Star Television, which was owned and founded by Niven, Ida Lupino, Dick Powell, and Charles Boyer. The show ended in 1955, but Four Star became a highly successful TV production company.

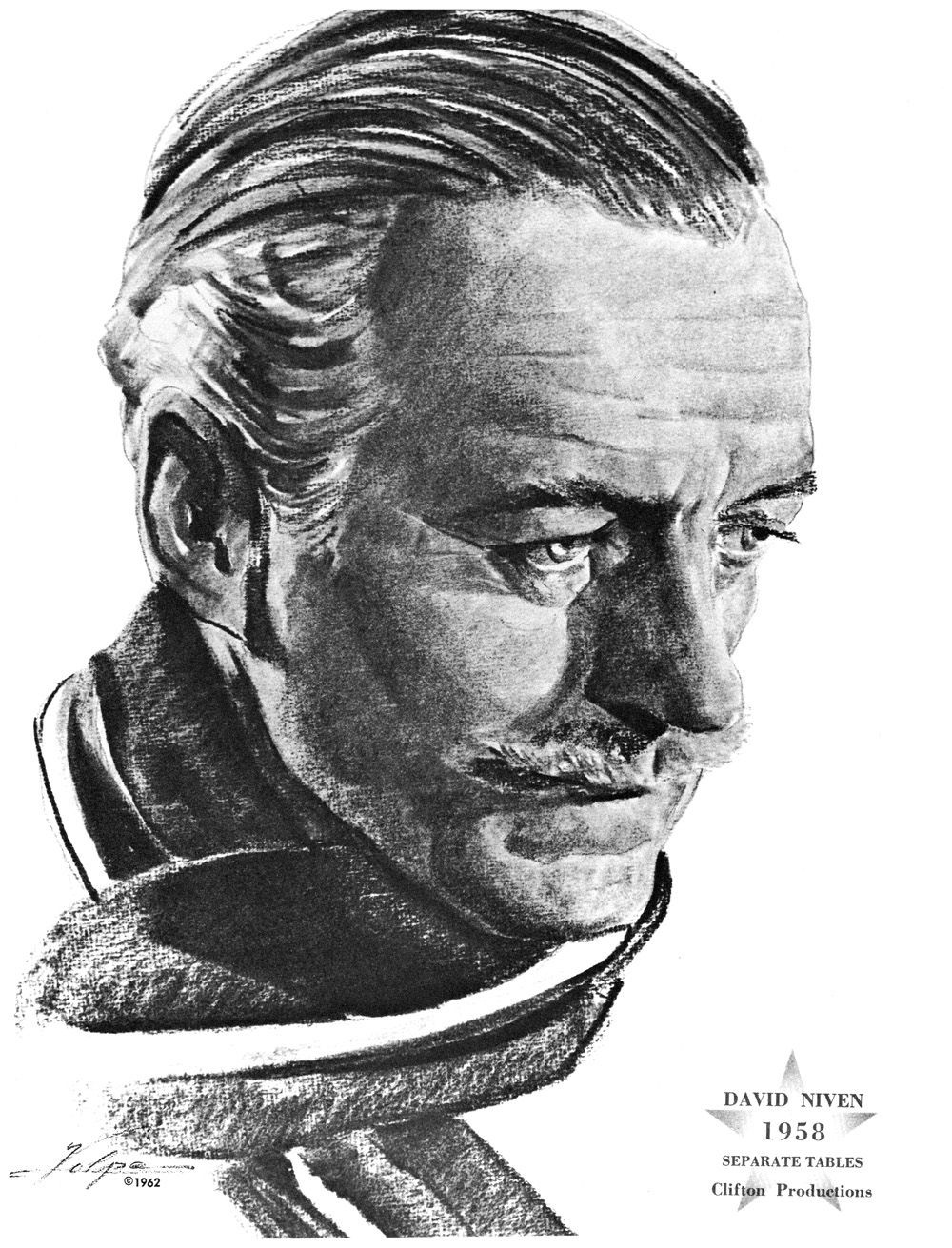
Drawing of Niven commemorating his 1958 Oscar win for Separate Tables

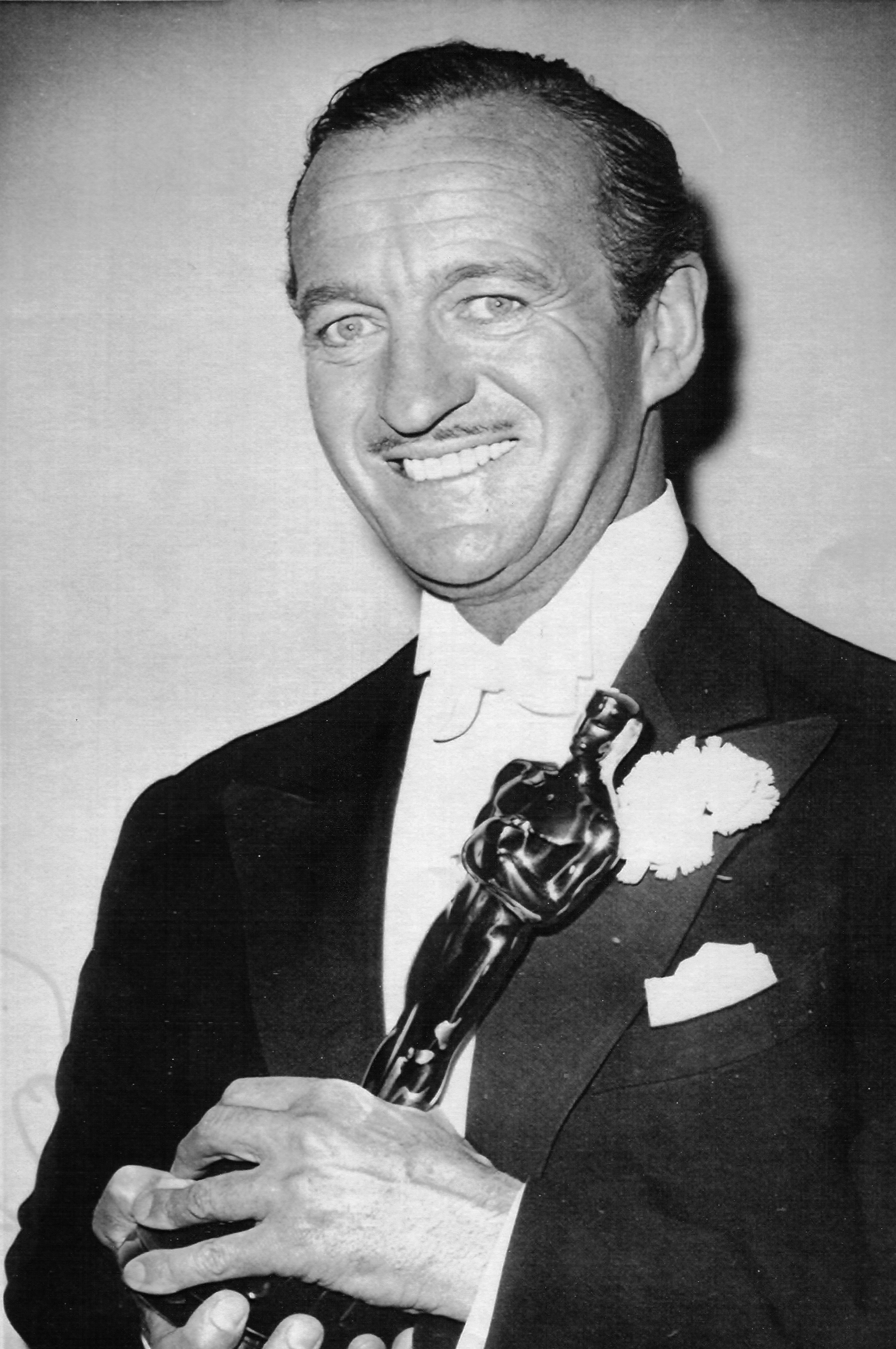
Host/Best Actor, 1959

Niven is the only person to win an Academy Award at the ceremony he was hosting. He won the 1959 Academy Award for Best Actor for his role as Major David Angus Pollock in Separate Tables, his only nomination for an Oscar. Appearing on-screen for only 23 minutes in the film, this is the briefest performance ever to win a Best Actor Oscar. He was also a co-host of the 30th, 31st, and 46th Academy Awards ceremonies. After Niven had won the Academy Award, Goldwyn called with an invitation to his home. In Goldwyn's drawing-room, Niven noticed a picture of himself in uniform which he had sent to Goldwyn from Britain during the Second World War. In happier times with Goldwyn, he had observed this same picture sitting on Goldwyn's piano. Now years later, the picture was still in exactly the same spot. As he was looking at the picture, Goldwyn's wife Frances said, "Sam never took it down."

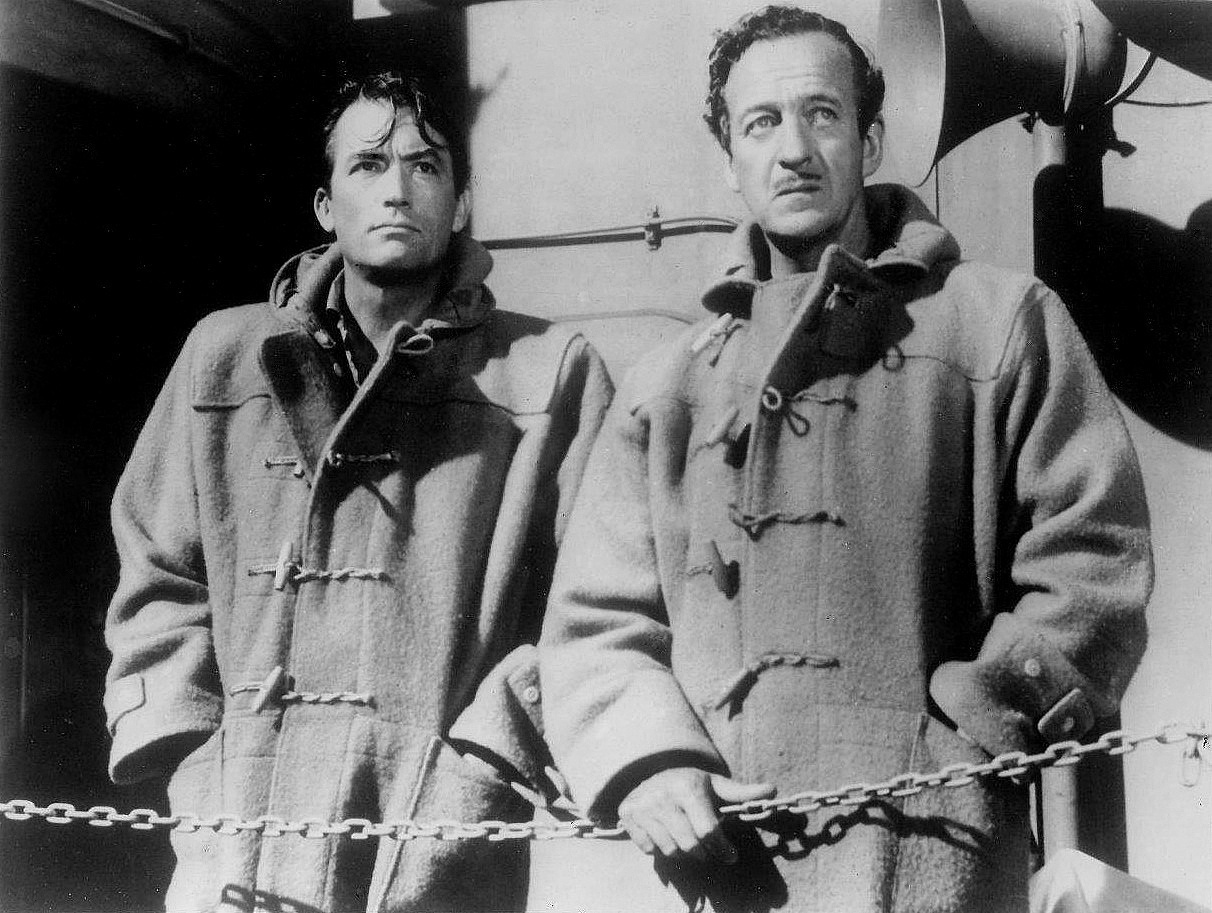
Niven and Gregory Peck in The Guns of Navarone (1961)

With an Oscar to his credit, Niven's career continued to thrive. In 1959, he became the host of his own TV drama series, The David Niven Show, but he was still starring in major films. He led in Ask Any Girl (1959), with Shirley MacLaine; the Carl Reiner-scripted Happy Anniversary (1959) opposite Mitzi Gaynor; and Please Don't Eat the Daisies (1960) with Doris Day, a huge hit.

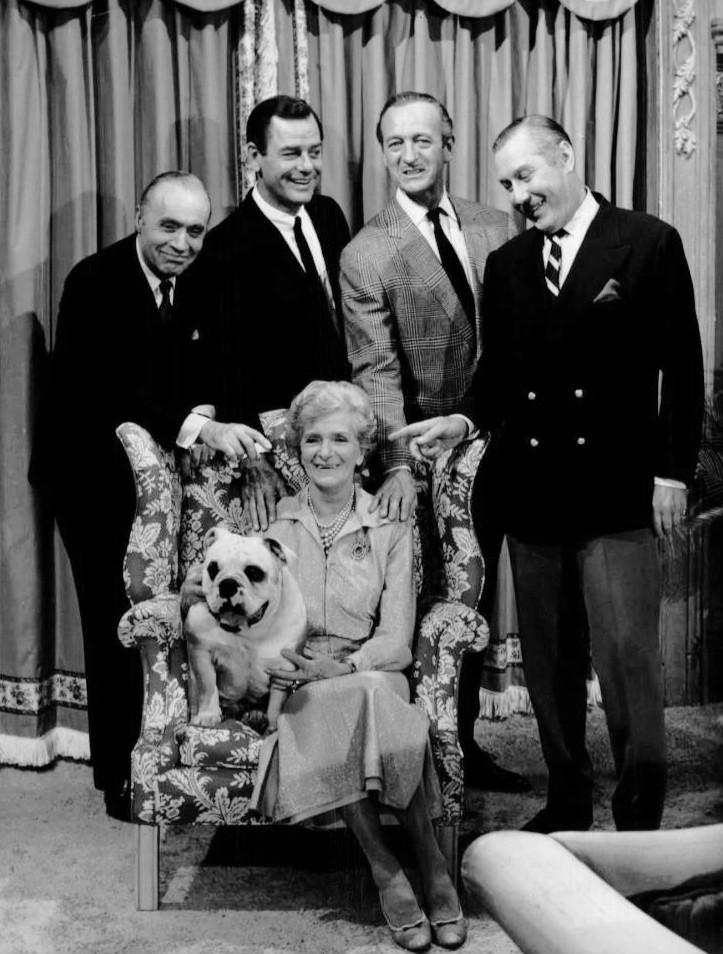
The cast of The Rogues (1964) with Charles Boyer, Gig Young, Niven, Robert Coote and Gladys Cooper

Even more popular was the action film The Guns of Navarone (1961) with Gregory Peck and Anthony Quinn. This role led to the ex-soldier being cast in further war and/or action films: The Captive City (1962); The Best of Enemies (1962); Guns of Darkness (1962); and 55 Days at Peking (1963) with Charlton Heston and Ava Gardner. Niven returned to comedy with The Pink Panther (1963), also starring Peter Sellers, another huge success at the box office. Less so was the comedy Bedtime Story (1964) with Marlon Brando, later remade with Michael Caine in a very Nivenish performance under the title Dirty Rotten Scoundrels. In 1964, Charles Boyer, Gig Young, and top-billed Niven appeared in the Four Star series The Rogues for NBC. Niven played Alexander 'Alec' Fleming, one of a family of retired con-artists who now fleece villains in the interests of justice. This was his only recurring role on television, and the series was originally set up to more or less revolve between the three leads in various combinations (one-lead, two-lead and three-lead episodes), although in the event, Gig Young, being the least busy, carried most of the series, with an assist from Larry Hagman. The Rogues ran for one season and won a Golden Globe.

==== 1965–1983: Later films ====
In 1965, Niven made two films for Metro-Goldwyn-Mayer: the Peter Ustinov-directed Lady L with Paul Newman and Sophia Loren, and Where the Spies Are, as a doctor-turned-secret agent. After the horror film Eye of the Devil (1966), Niven went the secret agent route again, appearing as James Bond in the hit Casino Royale in 1967. He remains, with the exception of Sean Connery in Never Say Never Again, the only other man to portray Bond in a non-Eon Productions film. Niven had been Bond creator Ian Fleming's choice to play Bond in Dr. No. Casino Royale co-producer Charles K. Feldman said later that Fleming had written the book with Niven in mind, and therefore had sent a copy to Niven. Niven is the only actor who played James Bond to be mentioned by name in the text of a Fleming novel. In chapter 14 of You Only Live Twice, pearl diver Kissy Suzuki refers to Niven as "the only man she liked in Hollywood", and the only person who "treated her honourably" there.

Niven made two popular comedies, Prudence and the Pill (1968) and The Impossible Years (1968). Less widely seen was the offbeat The Extraordinary Seaman for John Frankenheimer in 1969. The Brain, a French comedy with Bourvil and Jean-Paul Belmondo, was the most popular film at the French box office in 1969. He did a war drama Before Winter Comes (1969) next, followed by a return to comedy in The Statue (1971).

Buoyed by the massive success of his best-selling memoir, The Moon's a Balloon, Niven was in demand throughout the last decade of his life. King, Queen, Knave (1972) and Vampira (1974) were followed by one of the most enduring images of Niven. While hosting the 46th Annual Oscars ceremony, a naked man (Robert Opel) appeared behind Niven, "streaking" across the stage. In what instantly became a live-TV classic moment, a bemused Niven responded, "Isn't it fascinating to think that probably the only laugh that man will ever get in his life is by stripping off and showing his shortcomings?" That same year, he hosted David Niven's World for LWT, which profiled contemporary adventurers such as hang gliders, motorcyclists, and mountain climbers: it ran for 21 episodes. In 1975, he narrated The Remarkable Rocket, a short animation based on a story by Oscar Wilde.

Continuing with his film career, he starred in the highly regarded drama Paper Tiger (1975) and a Disney comedy, No Deposit, No Return (1976), while at the same time appearing in lucrative TV commercials for cologne and coffee in Asia, setting a trend that carries on with major North American film stars today. The all-star mystery spoof Murder By Death (1976) followed, after which came a better Disney outing, Candleshoe (1977), alongside Jodie Foster and Helen Hayes, and then the first of the all-star Ustinov-as-Poirot films, Death on the Nile (1978). A Nightingale Sang in Berkeley Square (1979); Escape to Athena (1979), another all-star effort, this time with his son as producer; then the far-better-than-usual Burt Reynolds vehicle Rough Cut (1980), and finally The Sea Wolves (1980), a wartime adventure film, rounded out his peak years. By the last two, and his TV mini-series A Man Called Intrepid (1979), Niven's declining health was becoming evident.

Niven's last leading role was in Better Late Than Never (1983). In July 1982, Blake Edwards brought an ailing Niven back for cameos in two "Pink Panther" films shot at the same time (Trail of the Pink Panther and Curse of the Pink Panther), reprising his role as Sir Charles Lytton. By the time of filming, Niven was fully in the throes of amyotrophic lateral sclerosis and his voice was no longer usable. His lines were dubbed, however inadequately, on short notice, by Rich Little. Niven only learned of it from a newspaper report.

=== Writing ===
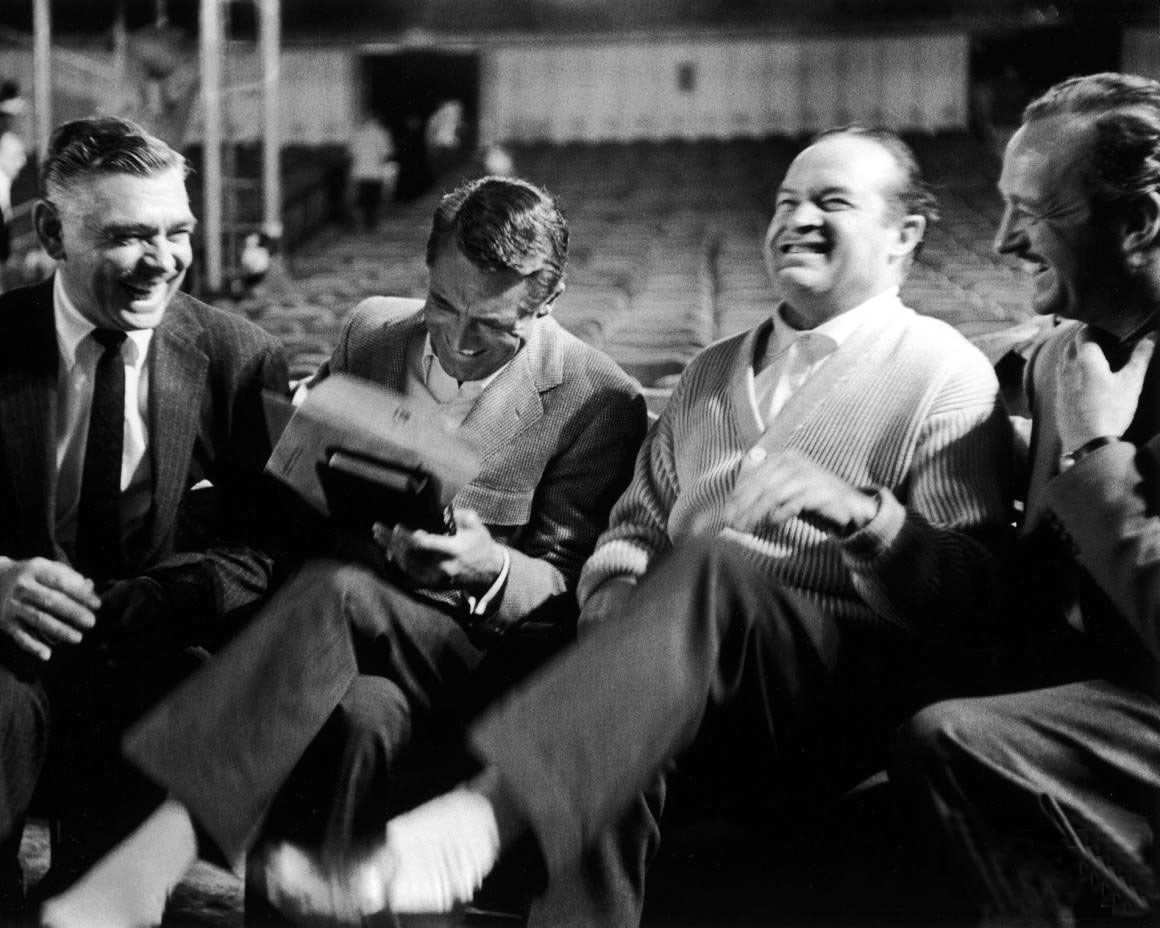
Clark Gable, Cary Grant, Bob Hope, and Niven laughing in the 1950s

Niven wrote four books. The first, Round the Rugged Rocks, was a novel that appeared in 1951, when his film career was at its nadir, and was forgotten immediately. The plot was plainly autobiographical (although not recognised as such at the time of publication), involving a young soldier, John Hamilton, who leaves the British Army, becomes a liquor salesman in New York, is involved in indoor horse racing, goes to Hollywood, becomes a deckhand on a fishing boat, and finally ends up as a highly successful film star.

In 1971, he published his autobiography, The Moon's a Balloon, selling over five million copies. He followed this with Bring On the Empty Horses in 1975, a collection of entertaining reminiscences from the Golden Age of Hollywood in the 1930s and 1940s. As a raconteur rather than an accurate memoirist, Niven recounted some incidents from a first-person perspective that happened to other people, among them Cary Grant. This borrowing and embroidering of his personal history was also said to be the reason why he persistently refused to appear on This Is Your Life. Niven's penchant for exaggeration is particularly apparent when comparing his written descriptions of his early film appearances (especially Barbary Coast and A Feather in her Hat), and his Oscar acceptance speech, to the filmed evidence. In all three examples, the reality differs from Niven's accounts as presented in The Moon's a Balloon and related in various chat show appearances.

In 1981 Niven published a second and much more successful novel, Go Slowly, Come Back Quickly, which was set during and after the Second World War, and which drew on his experiences during the war and in Hollywood.

== Personal life ==
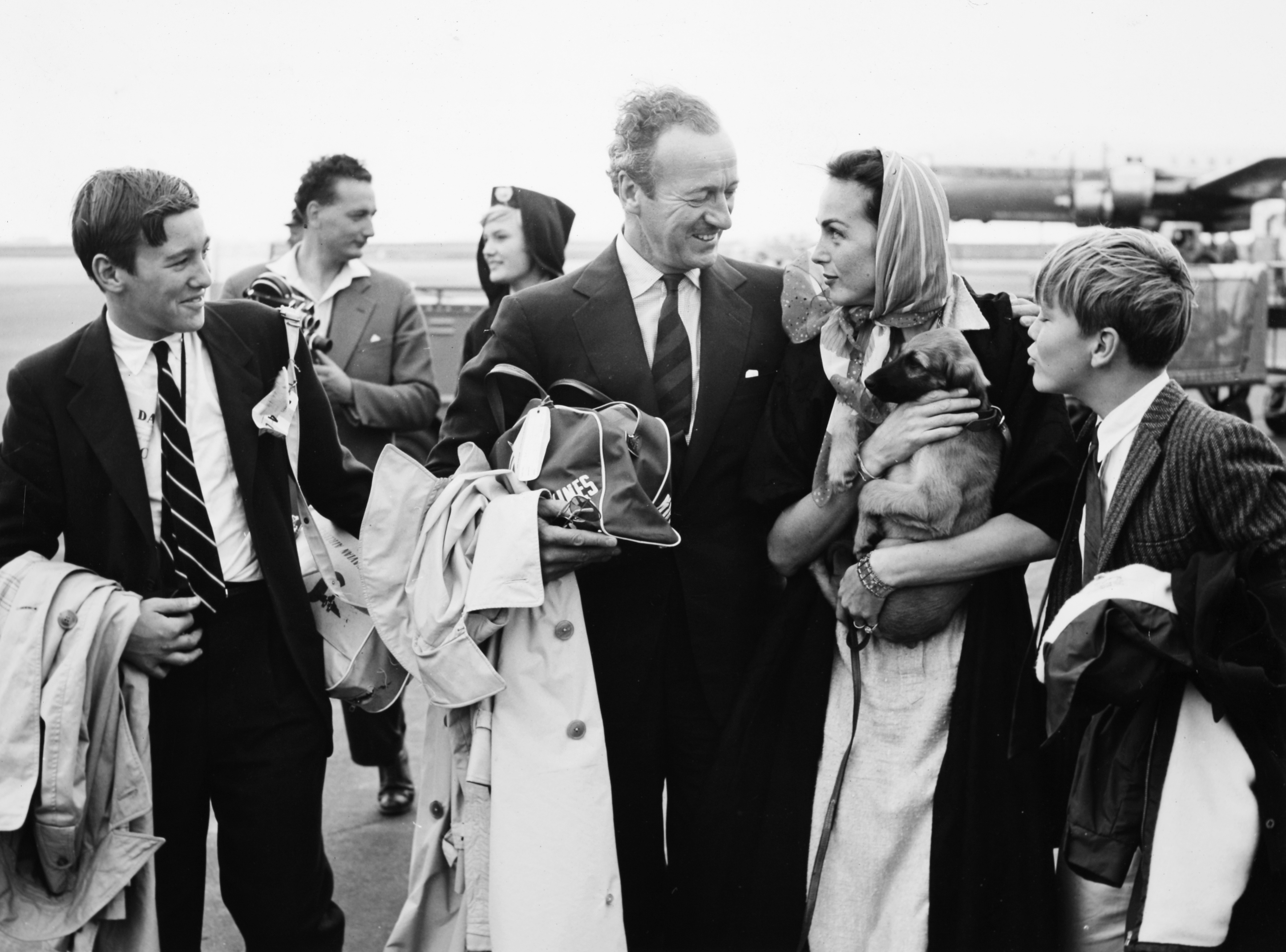
Niven with his family at Copenhagen Airport (5 August 1958)

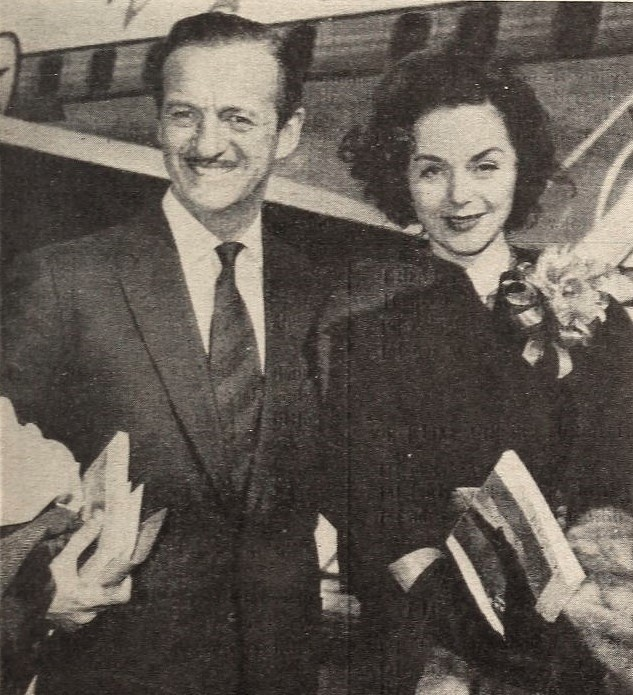
Niven with his wife Hjördis Genberg (Hjördis Tersmeden), 1960

While on leave in 1940, Niven met Primula "Primmie" Susan Rollo (18 February 1918 – 21 May 1946), the daughter of London lawyer William H.C. Rollo and maternal granddaughter of the 6th Marquess of Downshire. After a whirlwind romance, they married on 16 September 1940. A son, David Jr., was born in December 1942 and a second son, James Graham Niven, on 6 November 1945. Primmie died at the age of 28, six weeks after the family moved to the US. She fractured her skull in a fall in the Beverly Hills home of Tyrone Power and Annabella, while playing a game of sardines. She had walked through a door believing it to be a closet, but instead, it led to a stone staircase to the basement.

In 1948, Niven met and married Hjördis Paulina Tersmeden (née Genberg, 1919–1997), a divorced Swedish fashion model. He recounted their meeting:

I had never seen anything so beautiful in my life – tall, slim, auburn hair, up-tilted nose, lovely mouth and the most enormous grey eyes I had ever seen. It really happened the way it does when written by the worst lady novelists ... I goggled. I had difficulty swallowing and had champagne in my knees.

According to friends, the relationship between Niven and Hjördis was turbulent.

In 1960, Niven bought a chalet in Château-d'Œx near Gstaad in Switzerland, living near expatriate friends including Deborah Kerr, Peter Ustinov, and Noël Coward. It is believed that Niven's choice to become a tax exile may have been one reason why he never received a British honour. However, Kerr, Ustinov, and Coward were honoured. A 2009 biography of Niven contained assertions that he had an affair with Princess Margaret, who was 20 years his junior. He also became close friends with William F. Buckley Jr. and his wife Pat; Buckley wrote a memorial tribute to him in Miles Gone By (2004).

Eventually Niven divided his time between his chalet in Château-d'Œx and his home at Cap Ferrat on the Côte d'Azur in the south of France.

== Death and legacy ==
In 1978, Niven began experiencing weight loss, and by 1980 general fatigue, muscle weakness, and slurred speech. His interviews on the talk shows of Michael Parkinson and Merv Griffin alarmed family and friends; viewers wondered if Niven had either been drinking or suffered a stroke. He blamed his slightly slurred voice on the shooting schedule of the film he had been making, Better Late Than Never. He was diagnosed with motor neurone disease (ALS) in 1980. His final appearance in Hollywood was hosting the 1981 American Film Institute tribute to his old friend Fred Astaire.

In February 1983, using a false name to avoid publicity, Niven was hospitalised for 10 days, ostensibly for a digestive problem. Afterwards, he returned to his chalet at Château-d'Œx. Though his condition continued to worsen, he refused to return to the hospital, a decision supported by his family. He died at his chalet on 29 July 1983, aged 73. Niven was buried on 2 August in the local cemetery of Château-d'Œx.

A thanksgiving service for Niven was held at St Martin-in-the-Fields, London, on 27 October 1983. The congregation of 1,200 included Prince Michael of Kent; Margaret Campbell, Duchess of Argyll; John Mills; Richard Attenborough; Trevor Howard; David Frost; Joanna Lumley; Douglas Fairbanks Jr.; and Laurence Olivier. Biographer Graham Lord wrote, "the biggest wreath, worthy of a Mafia Godfather's funeral, was delivered from the porters at London's Heathrow Airport, along with a card that read: 'To the finest gentleman who ever walked through these halls. He made a porter feel like a king.'"

In 1985, Niven was included in a series of British postage stamps, along with Alfred Hitchcock, Charles Chaplin, Peter Sellers, and Vivien Leigh, to commemorate "British Film Year". Niven's appearance was the inspiration for that of Commander Norman in the Thunderbirds franchise, as well as DC Comics villain Sinestro.

Niven's Bonjour Tristesse co-star, Mylène Demongeot, declared about him in a 2015 filmed interview:

He was like a Lord, he was part of those great actors who were extraordinary like Dirk Bogarde, individuals with lots of class, elegance and humour. I only saw David get angry once. Preminger had discharged him for the day but eventually asked to get him. I said, sir, you had discharged him, he left for Deauville to gamble at the casino. So we rented a helicopter so they immediately went and grabbed him. Two hours later, he was back, full of rage. There I saw David lose his British phlegm, his politeness and class. It was royal. [Laughs].

== Acting credits and accolades ==
=== Awards and nominations ===
Year	Association	Category	Nominated work	Result	Ref.
1954	BAFTA Award	Best British Actor	Carrington V.C.	Nominated	
1955	Emmy Awards	Best Actor in a Single Performance	Four Star Playhouse	Nominated	
1957	Emmy Awards	Best Actor in a Single Performance	Four Star Playhouse	Nominated	
1953	Golden Globe Awards	Best Actor in a Motion Picture – Musical or Comedy	The Moon is Blue	Won	
1957	Golden Globe Awards	Best Actor in a Motion Picture – Musical or Comedy	My Man Godfrey	Nominated	
1958	Golden Globe Awards	Best Actor in a Motion Picture – Drama	Separate Tables	Won	
1958	Academy Award	Best Actor	Separate Tables	Won	

== Bibliography ==
- Niven, David (1951). Round the Rugged Rocks. London: The Cresset Press.
- Niven, David (1971). The Moon's a Balloon. London: Hamish Hamilton. ISBN 0-340-15817-4.
- Niven, David (1975). Bring on the Empty Horses. Hamish Hamilton. ISBN 0-241-89273-2.
- Niven, David (1981). Go Slowly, Come Back Quickly. Hamish Hamilton. ISBN 0-241-10690-7.

=== Further reading ===
- Lord, Graham (14 December 2004). NIV: The Authorized Biography of David Niven. Macmillan. ISBN 978-0-312-32863-4.
- Morley, Sheridan (5 September 2016). The Other Side of the Moon: The Life of David Niven. Dean Street Press. ISBN 978-1-911413-63-9.

== See also ==
- List of Academy Award winners and nominees from Great Britain
- List of actors with Academy Award nominations
- List of actors with more than one Academy Award nomination in the acting categories
