= David Niven Jr. =

British actor and film executive (born 1942)

- Born: 15 December 1942 (age 83); London, England
- Occupations: Producer, actor
- Spouses: Barbara Bucholz (m. 1993; div. 1998) Beatrice Anne Reed (m. 2000; div. 2005)
- Father: David Niven

David Niven Jr. (born 15 December 1942) is a British film producer, film actor and script writer who was an executive at Paramount Pictures and Columbia Pictures. He is the son of actor David Niven and Primula Rollo.

== Career ==
Niven was the head of the William Morris Agency in Europe, which he left for Columbia Pictures in 1970. His many clients included Robert Woods. He was managing director of Paramount Pictures England until 1975 when he turned his focus to film production.

In 1976, he produced The Eagle Has Landed, and in 1979, he produced Escape to Athena, which starred his father. He was nominated for a Primetime Emmy Award in 1985 as Executive Producer of The Night They Saved Christmas which he co-wrote with James C. Maloney.

Niven was a regular on the 1990 edition of To Tell the Truth, which was hosted by Gordon Elliott making 14 appearances.

During the 1990s he was the chair emeritus of the Recording Artists, Actors and Athletes against Drunk Driving (R.A.D.D) group in Hollywood, and founder of the bicycle safety group See a Child, Save a Child. In 2002 he successfully campaigned for a Child Safety Day and Week which was accepted by the City of Los Angeles.

At a book launch by Jackie Collins in 1987, Niven was asked if he would ever write a book about his life, to which he replied "But how can I when everything, everything, I have ever done, said or thought appears in Jackie's novels." 'There's nothing left,' he laments. 'I don't know why the headings on some of the chapters shouldn't be, 'I'd like to dedicate this to...' "

Niven's acting credits include Rush Hour 3 and The Cool Surface.

Away from film, Niven invested in the restaurant Drones, in Pont Street, London in 1972, which he recommended being named after Bertie Wooster's fictional club. At his request, a picture of his father was positioned on the wall. The restaurant was later run by Marco Pierre White's restaurant group White Star Group. The location changed under new owners and closed in 2007.

== Personal life ==
Noël Coward was Niven's godfather, and gave him a silver cocktail shaker with the inscription "Because, my Godson dear, I rather / Think you'll turn out like your father."

Niven was married to actress and producer Barbara Niven from 1993 to their divorce in 1998. He had previously had a relationship with Natalie Wood during the 1960s. He married his second wife Beatrice Anne Reed, daughter of Annette de la Renta in 2000, but divorced in 2005. In 2009 he sold his house on Sunset Boulevard for $5 million.

In 1994, Niven and his brother Jamie gave their father's archive to the Academy's Margaret Herrick Library. In 2009, Michael Munn released a biography of his father, David Niven, by which Niven Jr. was horrified. Niven and his brother had been close to their father and they challenged many of the claims in the book.

== Filmography ==
=== Producer and executive producer ===
- The Eagle Has Landed (1976)
- Escape to Athena (1979)
- Monsignor (1982)
- Better Late Than Never (1983)
- Kidco (1984)
- The Night They Saved Christmas (1984)
- That's Dancing! (1985)
- Minnelli on Minnelli: Liza Remembers Vincente (1985)
- The Wonderful Wizard of Oz: 50 Years of Magic (1990)
- The Cool Surface (1993)
- Blue Flame (1993)
- R.A.D.D: Drive My Car (1994)
- The Girl With Hungry Eyes (1995)
- To Oz: Making of a Classic (2009)

=== Acting ===
- Lisa (1989)
- The Cool Surface (1993)
- Rush Hour 3 (2007)

=== Appearances ===
- To Tell the Truth (1990–91)
- Biography (1995)
- The 100 Most Memorable TV Moments (2004)
- The Hollywood Greats (2005)
- Natalie Wood: What Remains Behind (2020)
