= The Night They Saved Christmas =

1984 American fantasy drama television film by Jackie Cooper

- Genre: Drama; Family; Fantasy
- Story by: Jim Moloney & Rudy Dochtermann & David Niven Jr.
- Directed by: Jackie Cooper
- Starring: Jaclyn Smith; Paul Le Mat; Art Carney; Paul Williams
- Theme music composer: Charles Gross; Folliott S. Pierpont
- Country of origin: United States
- Original language: English

Production
- Executive producers: Jack Haley Jr. David Niven Jr. Robert Halmi Jr.
- Producers: David Kappes; Robert Halmi Sr.
- Cinematography: David Worth
- Editor: Eric Albertson
- Running time: 94 minutes
- Production company: RHI Entertainment

Original release
- Network: ABC
- Release: December 13, 1984

The Night They Saved Christmas is a 1984 American made-for-television fantasy drama film directed by Jackie Cooper and executive produced by Jack Haley Jr. and Robert Halmi Jr. The film, about an oil company dynamiting in the North Pole in search of an oil field unaware that they are endangering Santa Claus, stars Jaclyn Smith and Art Carney and premiered on ABC on December 13, 1984.

== Plot ==
A billion-dollar oil company, headed by Sumner Murdock (Mason Adams), sets forth on an exploration project in the North Pole that is recommended and managed by Michael Baldwin (Paul Le Mat).

The film opens with several dynamite blasts to break up the ice that's clogging up the deep-sea drilling rigs. Disappointingly to the company, the drilling rig produces no oil. Baldwin is then picked up from work by an airplane flown by his wife Claudia (Jaclyn Smith). On the way home, Claudia tells Michael that she wants to move the kids back to Los Angeles where they can live in a more civilized environment. Michael argues that he cannot just walk away from the exploration since it was his idea. Upon arriving home, Michael and Claudia must deal with their three children arguing with each other about the existence of Santa Claus. To make matters worse for Michael, Murdock, portrayed as the stereotyped insensitive corporate boss, threatens to terminate his employment if the exploration does not produce results.

The next day, Michael returns to his office, where met Santa Claus’s chief elf Ed (Paul Williams). Ed informs Baldwin that their dynamiting is causing damage to North Pole City, the home of Santa Claus and his elves. He explains that while their activities at "Site A", their primary drilling area, are causing extensive damage, any blasts at their secondary site, known as "Site B", would destroy North Pole City due to the greater proximity of the dynamite blasts. Assuming that Ed was just hired to pull off a practical joke, Baldwin bursts into uncontrollable laughter. The next day, Ed arrives at the Baldwins’ house in a modified World War II-era snowcat, explaining that he intends to take Michael and his family to North Pole City to prove that Santa Claus is real and reveal the damage that is being done. Michael cannot go since he has a meeting at work, but Claudia and the kids agree to go along, continuing to assume that it's just a practical joke.

Ed then takes them to North Pole City. They meet Santa (Art Carney) and Mrs. Claus (June Lockhart). Santa shows them his secrets, including a device that slows time down so he can make all his deliveries in one night and anti-radar devices that protect North Pole City from being sighted. Santa then shows Claudia how North Pole City has sustained damage because of the dynamiting at "Site A" and how the city is right next to "Site B," where the company may also begin to dynamite. He warns them that one blast at Site B would mean the end of the city and, therefore, Christmas as they know it. He then says that the main oil field is actually at Site A and that they will find it if they keep dynamiting there. Claudia initially does not believe Santa and remains unconvinced that he is real, until he proves it by perfectly recounting a Christmas experience from Claudia's childhood that only he could have known about.

Upon returning home, Claudia tells Michael and Murdock what Santa said about where the oil is. Murdock believes that Claudia and the kids were given a hallucinogenic drug by Gaylord, the corrupt head of a rival oil company, to keep them dynamiting in the wrong place. Murdock orders that Site B be dynamited on Christmas Eve so they can get to the oil before Gaylord does.

The kids eavesdrop on this meeting and decide to sneak out of the house in the middle of the night and take a snowmobile to warn Santa. The youngest child, C.B., is left behind to tell the parents where the older two went. When C.B. tells Claudia, the latter takes off in her plane to look for them. She sights snowmobile tracks and follows them into an ice fog. Santa, with his sleigh and reindeer, goes into the fog to rescue them and takes them back to North Pole City. The ice fog keeps Claudia and the kids trapped inside North Pole City, so they must remain there until the fog lifts.

Meanwhile, Michael requests that Murdock postpone the dynamiting until Claudia and the kids are found. Murdock denies the request. However, despite Murdock's orders, Michael continues to dynamite at Site A, believing that the oil field is located there regardless. On Christmas Eve, as the dynamite crew is out at Site B counting down to the time to dynamite, C.B. receives a call at home from a crew member informing him that a gigantic oil field has been discovered on Site A. C.B. rushes out of the house to catch up with his father, who just left for work, and give him the news. He then convinces his father that the dynamiting at Site B should be canceled since the oil has been found. Michael rushes to his office and radios the man in the hut near Site B to terminate the countdown. The man then leaves the hut, jumps on a snowmobile and rides out to the site, arriving just in time to stop the dynamiting.

That night, Santa drops Claudia and the children off at home while making his deliveries and the family is reunited. Murdock then arrives at the door to confront Michael on his refusing to dynamite at Site B. Michael informs him that oil had been found at Site A. Just then, the reindeer bells are heard and the Baldwins and Murdock go out to the porch to see the Santa flying across the sky. A stunned but happy Murdock offers Baldwin a promotion. Baldwin declines, saying that he is going to make Claudia happy by moving them back to Los Angeles.

== Cast ==
- Jaclyn Smith as Claudia Baldwin
- Art Carney as Santa Claus
- Paul Le Mat as Michael Baldwin
- Mason Adams as Sumner Murdock
- June Lockhart as Mrs. Claus
- Paul Williams as Ed, Chief Elf
- Scott Grimes as David
- Laura Jacoby as Marianne
- R.J. Williams as C.B.
- James Staley as Martin
- Albert Hall as Loomis
- Anne Haney as Hedda
- Buddy Douglas as Dr. Fernando
- Billy Curtis as Jack
- Michael Keys Hall as Harold Faulkner
- Randy Crosby as Pilot

== Critical reception ==
The film was nominated for Outstanding Children's Program at the 37th Primetime Emmy Awards alongside Punky Brewster, An Ewok Adventure, and Reading Rainbow - with the award eventually going to an episode of American Playhouse.

In his review for The New York Times, John J. O'Connor noted that even though "the special effects encompassing Santa and his helpers are pleasant enough ... the surrounding story doesn't generate much holiday cheer."

== See also ==
- List of Christmas films
- Santa Claus in film
