= Escape to Athena =

1979 British film by George P. Cosmatos

- Escape to Athena release poster
- Directed by: George P. Cosmatos
- Screenplay by: Edward Anhalt; Richard S. Lochte
- Story by: Richard S. Lochte; George P. Cosmatos
- Produced by: David Niven Jr; Jack Wiener
- Starring: Roger Moore; Telly Savalas; David Niven; Stefanie Powers; Claudia Cardinale; Richard Roundtree; Sonny Bono; Elliott Gould
- Cinematography: Gil Taylor
- Edited by: Ralph Kemplen
- Music by: Lalo Schifrin
- Production company: ITC Entertainment
- Distributed by: Associated Film Distribution
- Release dates: 9 March 1979 (United Kingdom); 6 June 1979 (United States); 19 July 1979 (Argentina); 12 January 1980 (Sweden)
- Running time: 125 minutes (Sweden: 119 minutes) (Argentina: 120 minutes) (United States: 101 minutes)
- Country: United Kingdom
- Language: English
- Budget: $10 million
- Box office: $850,000 (US rentals)

Escape to Athena is a 1979 British war film directed by George P. Cosmatos. It stars Roger Moore, Telly Savalas, David Niven, Stefanie Powers, Claudia Cardinale, Richard Roundtree, Sonny Bono and Elliott Gould. The film is set during the Second World War on a German-occupied Greek island. The music was composed by Lalo Schifrin. It was filmed on location on the island of Rhodes.

== Plot ==
In 1944, Allied prisoners at a POW camp on an unnamed Greek island are forced to excavate ancient artefacts. The camp Commandant, Major Otto Hecht, a former Austrian antiques dealer, is sending some of the valuable pieces to his sister living in Switzerland. However, the prisoners have discovered that the prisoners in the camp will be sent to other camps once the finds run out, so they arrange to keep "discovering" the same pieces. While Hecht is content to sit out the war, the SS Commandant of the nearby town, Major Volkmann, brutally enforces discipline, including reprisal executions of civilians.

Resistance to the Germans is led by Zeno, a former monk, and his few fighters. They use the local brothel, run by his girlfriend Eleana, as an undercover headquarters. Zeno, who is in contact with Allied Headquarters, is ordered to break the prisoners out of their camp and use them to liberate the town and capture the nearby U-boat refuelling depot.

Two captured USO artists, Charlie Dane and Dottie Del Mar, perform a concert as cover, while the Resistance takes over the camp. With the choice of being killed by Zeno or helping them, Hecht joins forces with the Allies, helping them eradicate Volkmann's troops as well as capturing the fuel depot. After completing the mission, Charlie asks Zeno to lead him and two other prisoners, Nat Judson and Bruno Rotelli, to the monastery atop Mount Athena to steal Byzantine treasures. Zeno rejects the offer, stating the treasures belong to the Greek people, but then receives word from Allied intelligence that the planned invasion of the islands is imminent, and the German garrison on Mount Athena must be neutralized. Without revealing the whole truth, Zeno tells Charlie, Rotelli and Judson that in return for their help, they can keep whatever antiquities they find.

The group discover a heavily armed garrison atop the mountain. Zeno uses gas to knock out most of the soldiers, but not before their commander orders a V-2 rocket launch to destroy the invasion fleet. Judson knocks out the control room with grenades, but one of the Germans activates the base's self-destruct mechanism. Not realizing the danger immediately, Charlie and Rotelli scour the monastery for the treasure, while Judson frees the monks. Zeno finds the self-destruct clock, but can't deactivate it. Zeno, the monks and the Americans escape just before the monastery explodes. Charlie escapes with the only treasure the Germans left behind — tin plates adorned with Adolf Hitler's face.

During the victory celebration in the village, Hecht, Charlie, and Dottie plan after the war to capitalise on treasures Hecht has already looted, by selling counterfeit copies to Americans. Professor Blake learns from one of the freed monks that their treasure — Byzantine plates made of gold — is safe, having been hidden in the brothel the entire time.

In the modern day, Zeno's former headquarters has been turned into a state museum housing the treasures of Mount Athena.

== Cast ==
- Roger Moore as Major Otto Hecht: an Austrian who is the Wehrmacht commandant of the POW camp, a former antiques dealer
- Telly Savalas as Zeno: the head of the Greek island's resistance movement
- David Niven as Professor Blake: senior British officer amongst the prisoners and a well-known archaeologist
- Stefanie Powers as Dottie Del Mar: an American USO artist (in fact, stripper), who was shot down with Charlie and detained in the POW camp
- Elliott Gould as Charlie Dane: an American comedian, USO performer and professional partner of Dottie
- Claudia Cardinale as Eleana: a local madame, girlfriend of Zeno
- Richard Roundtree as Sgt. Nat Judson: African-American POW and amateur magician
- Sonny Bono as Bruno Rotelli: an Italian POW, professional chef
- Anthony Valentine as Maj. Volkmann: SS officer, town commandant and Hecht's rival
- Siegfried Rauch as Lt. Braun: SS officer under Volkmann's command
- Richard Wren as Capt. Reistoffer: Volkmann's adjutant
- Michael Sheard as Sgt. Mann: Hecht's senior camp NCO
- Philip Locke as Colonel Vogel
- Steve Ubels as Capt. Lantz
- Paul Picerni as Zeno's Man
- Paul Stassino as Zeno's Man

William Holden, who was in a romantic relationship with Stefanie Powers at the time, makes an uncredited cameo as an American sergeant, commenting that he has not escaped as he has a comfortable life as a prisoner (an inside joke referencing his role in Stalag 17).

== Production ==
The film was based on a script by Dick Lochte who was a former Playboy PR executive. It was financed by Lew Grade's ITC Entertainment, which had previously made The Eagle Has Landed, which had been produced by the team of David Niven Jr and Jack Wiener, and had been successful. Consequently, ITC agreed to finance two more films from the same team, Escape to Athena and Green Ice. Grade gave the job of directing to George P. Cosmatos who had just made The Cassandra Crossing for ITC and who Grade felt "would make a great action movie and as 'action' was in vogue again I was confident we were on to a winner".

In October 1977, ITC announced what was then known as The Athena Boodle as part of a $97 million suite of movies that Lew Grade was making, which also included The Legend of the Lone Ranger, Movie Movie (then called Double Feature), The Boys from Brazil, Raise the Titanic, The Golden Gate from the Alistair MacLean novel (never made), Love and Bullets, The Muppet Movie and Road to the Fountain of Youth with Bing Crosby and Bob Hope (which was never made - Crosby died that month). Grade's first five films had been made in partnership with General Cinema, but Grade would finance these himself. The film was also known as The Athena Crisis.

Filming began in Greece on 21 February 1978. The bulk of the film was shot on the island of Rhodes. David Niven agreed to be in the film because his son produced it and he liked the idea of returning to Rhodes, where he had made The Guns of Navarone. William Holden was visiting his girlfriend Stefanie Powers during filming and was persuaded to make a cameo in the prison camp scene, presumably reprising his role as Stalag 17 escapee Sergeant J.J. Sefton. According to stuntman Vic Armstrong, the crew hated Cosmatos so much that they stole his hat and nailed it to a mast. Armstrong directed the motorcycle chase which he says took two weeks.

== Reception ==
Producer Jack Wiener said during the shoot that the film cost $10 million and needed to make $30 million at the box office to recoup its cost.

The film was partly financed and produced by Lew Grade's ITC Entertainment. Grade had wanted an action film and felt it "did not live up to expectations of the script" turning out to be "a broad comedy with action-adventure sequences and the combination just didn't work." Grade thought "the first eighty minutes were a failure because of these different elements but the last forty, action-packed minutes were wonderful. If only the emphasis had been on action throughout the film would have been a hit. Unfortunately it wasn't. Still, with the pre-sales I'd made we didn't lose nearly as much as we might have". David Niven Jr. said "we had a lot of fun on that picture, I just wish it had been more successful."

According to a number of sources, this film's motorcycle chase scene is, as one critic said, "one of the most memorable motorcycle chase scenes in cinematic history". Another says: "Film is an uneven mix of comedy and military action, but includes a stand out motorcycle chase. During a battle with the resistance, SS Major Volkmann escapes on a motorcycle with Charlie (played by Elliott Gould) chasing after him on a motorcycle with sidecar down narrow village streets. Impressive motorcycle stuntwork featuring some excellent jumps". Author Mark Hinchliff of Motorbike Writer ranks the chase in Escape to Athena as 3rd, only after those in The Great Escape (1st) and Skyfall (2nd). FilmInk called it "a frustrating watch – it’s got great things inside it struggling to get out, but is too flabby. Cardinale is wasted."

== See also ==
- Kelly's Heroes (1970)
- Inside Out (1975)
