= A Kiss in the Dark (1949 film) =

1949 film by Delmer Daves

- Directed by: Delmer Daves
- Screenplay by: Harry Kurnitz
- Story by: Everett Freeman; Devery Freeman
- Produced by: Harry Kurnitz
- Starring: David Niven; Jane Wyman
- Cinematography: Robert Burks
- Edited by: David Weisbart
- Music by: Max Steiner
- Distributed by: Warner Bros. Pictures
- Release date: March 25, 1949
- Running time: 87 minutes
- Country: United States
- Language: English

A Kiss in the Dark is a 1949 American comedy film directed by Delmer Daves and starring David Niven, Jane Wyman, Victor Moore, Wayne Morris and Broderick Crawford. The plot involves a pianist who purchases an apartment house full of eccentric tenants.

== Plot ==
Concert pianist Eric Phillips, who has been on the road touring for 21 years, returns home. He is served a warrant to perform repairs on the building that he owns and learns that his financial advisor Peter Danilo bought the building with Eric's money some time ago as an investment. Eric visits the building and meets some of its tenants, including the young and beautiful model Polly Haines, and Eric is attracted to her. Polly's suitor, insurance salesman Bruce Arnold, sells Eric a policy. Eric and the tenants agree to improve the building together, starting with a roof garden with a day-care center. However, a building inspector tells Eric that the building repairs are insufficient. Eric blames the former owner and present manager Horace Willoughby for the poor quality of the work and fires him. Polly comes to Horace's defense, telling Eric that Horace is a helpful but unfortunate man who was forced to sell the building. Filled with remorse, Eric rehires Horace to lead the repair effort.

Eric and Polly fall in love, and Bruce is jealous. Eric takes advice from their musician friend Madame Karina and works less with his hands. Bruce convinces Eric that Polly is not really interested in him and that she feigns interest so that Bruce can sell him insurance. Eric plans to tour again, but before he has a chance to go, Horace locks him with Polly in his apartment. They talk and discover that both Bruce and Peter want Eric separated from Polly, for different selfish reasons. Eric leaves on the tour with Polly and it becomes their honeymoon trip.

== Cast ==
- David Niven as Eric Phillips
- Jane Wyman as Polly Haines
- Victor Moore as Horace Willoughby
- Wayne Morris as Bruce Arnold
- Broderick Crawford as Mr. Botts
- Joseph Buloff as Peter Danilo
- Maria Ouspenskaya as Madame Karina
- Curt Bois as Hugo Schloss
- Percival Vivian as Benton
- Raymond Greenleaf as Martin Soames

== Production ==
In a contemporary review for The New York Times, critic Bosley Crowther called A Kiss in the Dark "flimsy and unoriginal" and wrote: "No one can take great exception to the formula of boy-meets-girl, so long as some bright contrivance is pleasantly worked into it. And no one can say that Miss Wyman is above a nice frolicsome lark. But the trouble with this standard fiction is that it isn't very bright and Miss Wyman has very little of a frolicsome nature to do in it."

== Reception ==
Variety listed the film as a box office disappointment.
