= Graham Lord =

British biographer and novelist

- Born: 16 February 1943; Southern Rhodesia
- Died: 13 June 2015 (aged 72)
- Education: Churchill College, Cambridge
- Occupations: Biographer; novelist

Graham Lord (16 February 1943 – 13 June 2015) was a British biographer and novelist. His biographies include those of Jeffrey Bernard, James Herriot, Dick Francis, Arthur Lowe, David Niven, John Mortimer and Joan Collins. He was the literary editor of the Sunday Express for 23 years, from 1969 to 1992.

== Life ==
Lord was born in Southern Rhodesia (now Zimbabwe), raised in Mozambique, educated at Falcon College, Zimbabwe and took an honours degree in History at Churchill College, Cambridge, where he edited the university newspaper Varsity.

After working briefly for the Cambridge Evening News, in 1965 he joined the Sunday Express in London as a reporter and feature writer, where he spent 23 years as Literary Editor, wrote a weekly column about books and interviewed almost every major English language author of the 1960s to 1990s, including Graham Greene, Dame Muriel Spark and Ruth Rendell.

From 1982 to 1988 he was vice-chairman of Newbury Mencap, from 1985-87 he represented the Lambourn Valley as a Conservative councillor on Newbury District Council, and in 1987 he launched the £20,000 Sunday Express Book of the Year Award. After leaving the Sunday Express in 1992 to become a full-time author, he wrote regularly for The Daily Telegraph, The Times and the Daily Mail. From 1994 to 1996, he edited the short story magazine Raconteur.

He also published a memoir of the people he met during his forty years in Fleet Street, Lord's Ladies and Gentlemen: 100 Legends of the 20th Century, which includes an unflattering profile of his former editor at the Sunday Express, Sir John Junor. In addition, his other books include an autobiographical portrait of Mozambique and Zimbabwe, nine novels, and a collection of short stories, essays and journalism, Lord of the Files. His books have been translated into French, Italian, Portuguese, Dutch, German, Russian and Chinese.

Graham Lord lived with his wife, Juliet, an artist, on Nevis, West Indies, and also in France.

== Death ==
Lord died of liver cancer on 13 June 2015, at the age of 72.

== Publications ==
=== Biographies ===
- Just The One: The Wives and Times of Jeffrey Bernard, Sinclair-Stevenson, 1992
- James Herriot: The Life of a Country Vet, Headline, 1997.
- Dick Francis: A Racing Life, Little, Brown & Co, 1999
- Arthur Lowe: A Life that Led to Mainwaring, Orion, 2002
- Niv: The Authorised Biography of David Niven, Orion, 2004
- John Mortimer: The Devil's Advocate - The Unauthorised Biography, Orion, 2005
- Joan Collins: The Biography of an Icon, Orion, 2007

=== Novels ===
- Marshmallow Pie, Macmillan, 1970
- A Roof Under Your Feet, Macdonald, 1973
- The Spider and the Fly, Hamish Hamilton, 1974
- God and All His Angels, Hamish Hamilton, 1976
- The Nostradamus Horoscope, Hutchinson, 1981
- Time Out of Mind, Hamish Hamilton, 1986
- A Party to Die For, Little, Brown & Co, 1997
- Sorry - We're Going to Have to Let You Go, Little, Brown & Co, 1999
- Under a Hammock Moon, Fern Hill Books, 2012

=== Memoir ===
- Ghosts of King Solomon's Mines: Mozambique and Zimbabwe. A Quest, Sinclair-Stevenson, 1991
- Lord's Ladies and Gentlemen: 100 Legends of the 20th Century, Fern Hill Books, 2012

=== Anthology ===
• Lord of the Files: Short Stories, Essays and Journalism, Fern Hill Books, 2013

- A Splinter of Ice: Short Stories, Amazon Kindle, 2013
