= Hollywood Star Preview =

American radio dramatic anthology series (1947–1950)

Hollywood Star Preview is an American dramatic anthology radio program that was broadcast on NBC September 28, 1947 - April 1, 1950, with the title changed to Hollywood Star Theater beginning in 1948. It was also known as Tums Hollywood Theater and Anacin Hollywood Star Theater.

== Overview ==
Hollywood Star Preview featured film stars from Hollywood introducing relatively unknown actors and actresses to the radio audience. In a typical episode, the night's guest star introduced the newcomer, who then acted in a drama that had been written for the program. After the dramatic segment ended, the star and the younger personality returned to the microphone. They discussed how they met and the star's feelings regarding the newcomer's ability, and they promoted upcoming films in which the two were involved. Ken Peters and Orval Anderson were the announcers.

== Guests ==
Partial List of Stars and the Newcomers They Presented in Episodes of Hollywood Star Preview
Date	Star	Newcomer
September 28, 1947	Ronald Colman	Vanessa Brown
February 1, 1948	Lionel Barrymore	William Conrad
July 25, 1948	Douglas Fairbanks Jr.	Marie Windsor
June 11, 1949	Claire Trevor	Steve Brodie

== Production ==
Joe Thompson was the producer. Jack Van Nostrand, Nat Wolff, and Jack Johnstone were the directors. Jeff Alexander and Bernard Katz provided music. The program initially was broadcast on Sundays from 6:30 to 7 p.m. Eastern Time, replacing The Adventures of Ellery Queen. In the fall of 1948 it was moved to Saturdays from 8 to 8:30 p.m. E. T. Sponsors were Tums antacid and Whitehall Pharmaceutical Company (promoting Anacin and Kolynos). Whitehall canceled the program in 1950 with plans to transfer to television the amount it had been paying for sponsorship. The company blamed NBC for the program's failure to achieve satisfactory ratings, saying changes in preceding programs disturbed listening habits.

== Critical response ==
A review in The New York Times said that the merits of offering newcomers opportunities to star on a radio program were offset by "indifferent and routine production", so that the program failed to reach its potential. The review concluded, "At best Hollywood Star Preview is bargain basement Lux Theatre."
