= Better Late Than Never (1983 film) =

1983 film by Bryan Forbes

- Theatrical release poster
- Directed by: Bryan Forbes
- Written by: Bryan Forbes
- Story by: Gwen Davis
- Produced by: Raymond Chow; David Niven, Jr.; Jack Haley, Jr.
- Starring: David Niven; Art Carney; Maggie Smith; Kimberley Partridge
- Cinematography: Claude Lecomte
- Edited by: Phillip Shaw
- Music by: Henry Mancini
- Production company: Golden Harvest
- Distributed by: Warner Bros.
- Release date: 15 April 1983
- Running time: 89 minutes
- Country: United Kingdom
- Language: English
- Box office: $24,164

Better Late Than Never is a 1983 British comedy film directed by Bryan Forbes and starring David Niven, Art Carney and Maggie Smith. The soundtrack features songs by Henry Mancini and Noël Coward.

== Plot ==
Nick (Niven) is the supposed grandfather of 10-year-old Bridget (Partridge), who stands to inherit a sizeable fortune. Charley (Carney) shows up and claims that he is the genuine grandpa. Both men once slept with Bridget's grandmother, and she was never certain which of the two produced her child. Neither Nick nor Charley are good prospects, so Bridget must choose from the lesser of two evils.

== Principal cast ==
Actor	Role
David Niven	Nick Hartland
Art Carney	Charley Dunbar
Maggie Smith	Miss Anderson
Catherine Hicks	Sable
Lionel Jeffries	Bertie
Melissa Prophet	Marlene
Kimberley Partridge	Bridget
Jean-Pierre Castaldi	Doctor

== Production ==
Forbes previously offered Carney's role to William Holden, whose agent persuaded him to decline because the fee offered was too small. During the shoot Holden died following an accident while drinking, and Forbes wrote in 1992 that if Holden had made the film he "might have been alive today." Bob Hope was also approached for the role, and Ralph Richardson for the part of the lawyer (ultimately played by Lionel Jeffries).

The working title was Ménage à trois. Filming took place near Niven's home on Cap Ferrat. It was the first time Niven sang on screen, and the last film where his own voice would be heard. (Note: In Curse of the Pink Panther, Niven was dubbed.) Forbes and producer David Niven Jr. both noticed the star's difficulty walking and speaking during production; when it persisted, he underwent tests and was diagnosed with ALS.

== Release ==
The film was first shown in Britain on BBC1 on Christmas Day 1983.

== Reception ==
Leslie Halliwell dismissed the film: "Would-be risqué comedy which fails to spark despite the talents involved." In his autobiography, Forbes refers to it in passing as "a slight comedy". Smith's biographer Michael Coveney calls it "thoroughly mawkish... a strong contender for Maggie's worst film":

The mechanics of the comedy are pretty hopeless and an overall air of shoddiness is not dispelled by some attractive locations in the South of France nor by the Niven character's bottom-chasing antics on the beach... Mixed in with the awful soundtrack by Henry Mancini and a charmless child actor, the film leaves a sour taste in the mouth.

== Bibliography ==
- Forbes, Bryan (1993) [1st pub. Heinemann 1992]. A Divided Life: Memoirs. London: Mandarin. ISBN 0-7493-0884-2.
- Morley, Sheridan (1985). The Other Side of the Moon: The Life of David Niven. Long Preston: Magna Print. ISBN 0-860099-75-X.
