= The Moon's a Balloon =

Book by David Niven

The Moon's a Balloon: Reminiscences
- Author: David Niven
- Language: English
- Genre: Memoir
- Publisher: Hamish Hamilton
- Publication date: 1971
- Publication place: United Kingdom
- Pages: 312
- ISBN: 0-241-02062-X
- OCLC: 59141872
- Dewey Decimal: 791.43/028/0924 B
- LC Class: PN2598.N5 A3 1971

The Moon's a Balloon is a best-selling memoir by British actor David Niven (1910–1983), published in 1971. It details his early life. There have been several editions and many translations of the book over the years. Niven followed it with a sequel, Bring on the Empty Horses, in 1975.

The book has been described as "a funny yet tragic tale, detailing everything from the loss of Niven's father to his knowledge of how to lead a good life".
