= Black Narcissus (disambiguation) =

Black Narcissus is a 1947 film by Powell and Pressburger.

Black Narcissus may also refer to:

== Media ==
- Black Narcissus, or Narcisse noir, a perfume introduced in 1911 by Parfums Caron
- Black Narcissus (novel), a 1939 novel by Rumer Godden
- Black Narcissus (TV series), a 2020 television adaptation of the 1939 novel

== Music ==
- Black Narcissus, a 1970–1976 band with Ricky Wilson
- Black Narcissus (Joe Henderson album), a 1976 album
- "Black Narcissus", a track on the 1998 Noblerot album by Ali Project
- Black Narcissus (Mephista album), a 2002 album
- Black Narcissus, a 2012 album by Nacho Picasso

== See also ==
- Narcissus (disambiguation)
