= Brian Easdale =

British composer (1909–1995)

Brian Easdale (10 August 1909 – 30 October 1995) was a British composer of operatic, orchestral, choral and film music, best known for his ballet film score The Red Shoes of 1948.

== Life ==
Easdale was born in Manchester, and was educated at Westminster Abbey School and the Royal College of Music, where he was a pupil of Armstrong Gibbs (composition) and Gordon Jacob (orchestration). His London introduction as a composer came through a concert of his own music he organised (shared with Herbert Murrill) at the Wigmore Hall on 1 July 1931, which attracted press notices. The concert included the Piano Sonata (1929), String Trio (1931) and five pieces accompanying recited texts by his sister, the poet Joan Adeney Easdale.

By the 1930s Easdale was living in London, in a Hampstead bed-sit. His downstairs neighbour, the poet Louis MacNeice, suggested to him that he should work for John Grierson's GPO Film Unit, where MacNeice's fellow poet W. H. Auden was already working alongside the young composer Benjamin Britten. Easdale also worked with Britten at the Group Theatre just before the war.

Called up early in the war, he was assigned to the Crown Film Unit and sent on special assignment to Information Films of India. While there he became interested in Indian music (in particular the music of Nepal) and its instruments, and also formed a friendship with Rumer Godden, author of Black Narcissus. On his return to the UK this connection helped win him the task of composing the score for the film of the novel in 1947. Percussion instruments he brought back from India were utilised in the music, and enormous bellowing Himalayan trumpets call out at the very beginning of the film.

There followed a decade of successful work as a film composer. When this came to an end in the early 1960s, Easdale returned to writing concert music. But aside from a high-profile choral commission for the consecration of the new Coventry Cathedral in 1962 – where his Missa Coventrensis was inevitably overshadowed by his friend Benjamin Britten's War Requiem – his concert work gained little attention. Following an alcoholic phase in the 1960s, Easdale continued to live in a private room at the Carlton Dene residential care home in Kilburn. He was actively involved in the live performance of his Red Shoes Suite at 1994's Kenwood Music Festival, conducted by Iain Sutherland.

Christopher Palmer described Easdale's musical style as "an eclectic English idiom that owes something to Britten as well as to the Bax-Bridge generations". In general his combination of lush late Romanticism mixed with "ethnic" colour and more austere Modernism suited the world of film music more than the concert hall.

He was twice married, and died at the age of 86, survived by three daughters and two sons.

== Works ==
For the opera house he composed Rapunzel (1927), The Corn King (1935, not performed until November 1950) with a libretto by his friend the Scottish poet and novelist Naomi Mitchison, and The Sleeping Children (1951), which was the first opera to be commissioned by Benjamin Britten's English Opera Group. However, the latter's expressionist/surrealist libretto, by Tyrone Guthrie, "full of dissolving dream images of sex and sadism" alienated the majority of the critics.

His orchestral works included a Death March, conducted by Malcolm Sargent in 1928, Five pieces for orchestra, Six Poems, first given in Vienna in 1936, and Tone Poem (1939). The Concerto Lirico for piano and orchestra was performed at the Cheltenham Festival in 1955. Other works include some chamber music, the Evening Prelude (1951) for organ, a "lyric drama" Seelkie (1954) for chorus and small orchestra, and a song cycle Leaves of Grass, setting Whitman.

Easdale was best known for his film music. His documentary film scores for the GPO Film Unit include Big Money (1937), Job in a Million (1937) and Men in Danger (1939). With a few exceptions (including Outcast of the Islands for Carol Reed in 1951) his mainstream film scores were mostly written for Michael Powell and Emeric Pressburger, including Black Narcissus (1947), The Red Shoes (1948), The Small Back Room (1949), The Elusive Pimpernel (1950), The Battle of the River Plate (1956), Pressburger's Miracle in Soho (1957), and Powell's The Queen's Guards (1961) and Peeping Tom (1960). He was the first British composer to win an Academy Award for Best Original Music Score, for his music for The Red Shoes, and also won the music award at the Venice Film Festival for Gone To Earth in 1950.

== Recording ==
A CD of some of Easdale's film music was released in January 2011. Recorded in 2010 by the BBC National Orchestra of Wales with the BBC National Chorus of Wales. It includes the full ballet sequence from The Red Shoes (from the original score, complete with Ondes Martenot), and extracts from Black Narcissus and Gone to Earth.
