= Amanda Coe =

English screenwriter and novelist

- Born: 1965 (age 60–61); Yorkshire, England
- Education: University of Oxford
- Occupations: Screenwriter, author

Amanda Coe (born 1965) is an English screenwriter and novelist.

== Early life ==
Coe was born in Yorkshire in 1965. She gained an MA in English from the University of Oxford.

== Career ==
Coe's scriptwriting began in the 1990s, working on Dangerfield, The Vet, the Channel 4 series As If, and episodes of Shameless. Filth: The Mary Whitehouse Story (2008) was Coe's version of the battle between the 'Clean Up' TV campaigner Mary Whitehouse and Hugh Greene, then Director General of the BBC. Coe was also due to write an episode of Doctor Who for Russel T. Davies, but it fell through. In 2009, she wrote the BBC 4 feature Margot. She subsequently won a BAFTA in 2013 for the BBC Four television adaptation of John Braine's Room at the Top.

Coe wrote BBC's 2015 three-part series on the Bloomsbury Set, Life in Squares, a biopic about the influential group of artists including Virginia Woolf. The series received positive reviews for risk-taking approach to a period drama. In 2017, she adapted Apple Tree Yard for BBC One, from the 2013 thriller novel of the same name by Louise Doughty.

In 2019, Coe wrote The Trial of Christine Keeler, based on the Profumo affair in the 1960s. Coe explained her attraction to the material, saying, "I’m excited to have the opportunity to bring a fresh lens to a story that has become a powerful fable of our national identity. The astonishing story of Christine Keeler and the so-called Profumo affair is the Salem Witch Trial meets O.J. Simpson – a perfect storm of gender, class, race and power that resonates into the world we’re living in today." In 2020, she wrote a new television adaptation of Black Narcissus, based on the 1939 novel of the same name by Rumer Godden. The series featured one of the final performances of Diana Rigg, who died in September 2020.

Coe has published two novels, the latest, Getting Colder, was published in November 2014 by Hachette UK. Her first novel, What They Do in the Dark, was published in 2011 by Virago. Both novels deal with the messy balance of public and private lives, taking deep looks into families as they deal with life-changing events.

Coe says her writing often has comic tones and frequently explores issues of class. Childhood is also a common theme in both her novels and screenwriting.

== Personal life ==
She lives in London with her husband and two children. In addition to her original work as a writer, she serves as a screenwriting associate at the National Film and Television School.
