= Marx's theory of human nature =

Marx's views on the totality of society, feelings and behaviors

In his works, Karl Marx does not refer to "human nature" as such, but to Gattungswesen, which is generally translated as "species-being" or "species-essence". According to a note from Marx in the Manuscripts of 1844, the term is derived from Ludwig Feuerbach's philosophy, in which it refers both to the nature of each human and of humanity as a whole.

In the sixth Thesis on Feuerbach (1845), Marx criticizes the traditional conception of human nature as a species which incarnates itself in each individual, instead arguing that human nature is formed by the totality of social relations. Marx describes Gattungswesen as neither permanent nor universal, as in classical idealist philosophy, but always determined in a specific social and historical formation, with some aspects being biological.

== Background ==
Philosophers such as Immanuel Kant and Thomas Hobbes believed that humans are naturally selfish, and that it was necessary to constrain human nature in order to achieve a good society. Kant thought rationality ought to be used in achieving this goal, whilst Hobbes placed emphasis on the force of the state. Marxists will argue that this view is an ideological illusion and the effect of commodity fetishism: the fact that people act selfishly is held to be a product of scarcity and capitalism, not an immutable human characteristic.

It is often said that Marx conceived of humans as homo faber, referring to Benjamin Franklin's definition of "man as the tool-making animal" – that is, as "man, the maker", though he never used the term himself.

== Writings of Karl Marx ==
=== Needs and drives ===
In the 1844 Manuscripts, the young Marx wrote:

As a natural being and as a living natural being, [Man] is on the one hand endowed with natural powers, vital powers... These forces exist in him as tendencies and abilities – as instincts. On the other hand, as a natural, corporeal, sensuous objective being he is a suffering, conditioned and limited creature, like animals and plants... [T]he objects of his instincts exist outside him, as objects independent of him; yet these objects are objects that he needs... indispensable to the manifestation and confirmation of his essential powers.

In his later works, Marx continues to conceive of human nature as composed of "tendencies", "drives", "essential powers", and "instincts" to act in order to satisfy "needs" for external objectives: Later, in the Grundrisse (1857–1858), Marx says his nature is a "totality of needs and drives". In The German Ideology (1846), he uses the formulation: "their needs, consequently their nature".

==== Basic needs ====
Some needs are far more important than others. In The German Ideology Marx writes that "life involves before everything else eating and drinking, a habitation, clothing and many other things". All those other aspects of human nature which he discusses (such as "self-activity") are therefore subordinate to the priority given to these. Marx makes explicit his view that humans develop new needs to replace old: "the satisfaction of the first need (the action of satisfying, and the instrument of satisfaction which has been acquired) leads to new needs".

In the 1844 Manuscripts, the young Marx wrote: "It is true that eating, drinking, and procreating, etc., are ... genuine human functions. However, when abstracted from other aspects of human activity, and turned into final and exclusive ends, they are animal."

=== Social relations and historical materialism ===
In the sixth of the Theses on Feuerbach, written in 1845, Marx writes that human nature is no more than what is made by social relations: "[T]he essence of man is no abstraction inherent in each single individual. In reality, it is the ensemble of the social relations." Prior, in The Holy Family (1844), Marx argued that capitalists are not motivated by any essential viciousness, but by the drive toward the bare "semblance of a human existence". At around the same time, Marx wrote The German Ideology (1846), in which he wrote that "[a]s individuals express their life, so they are. Hence what individuals are depends on the material conditions of their production".

Later in 1847, Marx wrote The Poverty of Philosophy, stating his belief that human nature conditions the way in which individuals express their lives, against the background of the productive forces and relations of production, at the same time arguing that history involves "a continuous transformation of human nature". In The Communist Manifesto (1848), Marx criticised the tendency to "transform into eternal laws of nature and of reason, the social forms springing from your present mode of production and form of property".

In Capital (1867–1894), in a footnote critiquing utilitarianism, he says that utilitarians must reckon with "human nature in general, and then with human nature as modified in each historical epoch".

==== Labour ====
Marx's view was that productive activity is an essential human activity, and can be rewarding when pursued freely. However, Marx was always clear that under capitalism, labour was something inhuman, and dehumanising: "[L]abour is external to the worker – i.e., does not belong to his essential being; that he, therefore, does not confirm himself in his work, but denies himself, feels miserable and not happy, does not develop free mental and physical energy, but mortifies his flesh and ruins his mind".

Marx believed that, under communism, "In the individual expression of my life, I would have directly created your expression of your life, and therefore in my individual activity I would have directly confirmed and realised my true nature, my human nature, my communal nature".

==== Theory of history ====
Marx's theory of history attempts to describe the way in which humans change their environments and (in dialectical relation) their environments change them as well. That is:

Not only do the objective conditions change in the act of reproduction, e.g. the village becomes a town, the wilderness a cleared field etc., but the producers change, too, in that they bring out new qualities in themselves, develop themselves in production, transform themselves, develop new powers and ideas, new modes of intercourse, new needs and new language.

Further Marx sets out his "materialist conception of history" in opposition to "idealist" conceptions of history, that of Georg Wilhelm Friedrich Hegel, for instance. He writes that "[t]he first premise of all human history is, of course, the existence of living human individuals. Thus the first fact to be established is the physical organisation of these individuals and their consequent relation to the rest of nature." Thus:

History does nothing, it "possesses no immense wealth", it "wages no battles". It is man, real, living man who does all that, who possesses and fights; "history" is not, as it were, a person apart, using man as a means to achieve its own aims; history is nothing but the activity of man pursuing his aims.

=== Human and animal nature ===
In several passages throughout his work, Marx shows how he believes humans to be essentially different from other animals, as humans produce their physical environment: "Men can be distinguished from animals by consciousness, by religion or anything else you like. They themselves begin to distinguish themselves from animals as soon as they begin to produce their means of subsistence, a step which is conditioned by their physical organisation." At the same time, Marx notes in Estranged Labour that:

It is true that animals also produce. They build nests and dwellings, like the bee, the beaver, the ant, etc. But they produce only their own immediate needs or those of their young; they produce only when immediate physical need compels them to do so, while man produces even when he is free from physical need and truly produces only in freedom from such need... Animals produce only according to the standards and needs of the species to which they belong, while man is capable of producing according to the standards of every species and of applying to each object its inherent standard; hence, man also produces in accordance with the laws of beauty.

In the same work, Marx writes:

The animal is immediately one with its life activity. It is not distinct from that activity; it is that activity. Man makes his life activity itself an object of his will and consciousness. He has conscious life activity. It is not a determination with which he directly merges. Conscious life activity directly distinguishes man from animal life activity. Only because of that is he a species-being. Or, rather, he is a conscious being – i.e., his own life is an object for him, only because he is a species-being. Only because of that is his activity free activity. Estranged labour reverses the relationship so that man, just because he is a conscious being, makes his life activity, his essential being, a mere means for his existence.

Also in the segment on estranged labour:

Man is a species-being, not only because he practically and theoretically makes the species – both his own and those of other things – his object, but also – and this is simply another way of saying the same thing – because he looks upon himself as the present, living species, because he looks upon himself as a universal and therefore free being.

More than twenty years later, in Capital, he wrote:

A spider conducts operations that resemble those of a weaver, and a bee puts to shame many an architect in the construction of her cells. But what distinguishes the worst architect from the best of bees is this, that the architect raises his structure in imagination before he erects it in reality. At the end of every labour-process, we get a result that already existed in the imagination of the labourer at its commencement. He not only effects a change of form in the material on which he works, but he also realises a purpose of his own that gives the law to his modus operandi, and to which he must subordinate his will. And this subordination is no mere momentary act.

== Later interpretations ==
Norman Geras's Marx and Human Nature (1983) is a concise argument against the view that Marx did not believe there was something such as human nature, in particular the confusion surrounding the sixth of the Theses on Feuerbach. Geras offers an argument against Marx's position that social relations determine human nature. He argues that while the social relations are held to "determine" the nature of people, they are not the only such determinant. Geras gives a schedule of some of the needs which Marx says are characteristic of humans:

...for other human beings, for sexual relations, for food, water, clothing, shelter, rest and, more generally, for circumstances that are conducive to health rather than disease. There is another one ... the need of people for a breadth and diversity of pursuit and hence of personal development, as Marx himself expresses these, 'all-round activity', 'all-round development of individuals', 'free development of individuals', 'the means of cultivating [one's] gifts in all directions', and so on.

Geras said of Marx's work that: "Whatever else it is, theory and socio-historical explanation, and scientific as it may be, that work is a moral indictment resting on the conception of essential human needs, an ethical standpoint, in other words, in which a view of human nature is involved."

As regards Marx's theory of human nature against the nature of animals, Allen Wood argues that what is involved in making one's species one's object is more complicated.

=== Historical materialism ===
According to Marx, the expansion of the productive forces is itself the fundamental driving force of history. Some writers believe that it is Marx's conception of human nature which explains the "development thesis" concerning this "development thesis".

In his article, "Reconsidering Historical Materialism", however, Cohen gives an argument to the effect that human nature cannot be the premise on which the plausibility of the expansion of the productive forces is grounded:

Production in the historical anthropology is not identical with production in the theory of history. According to the anthropology, people flourish in the cultivation and exercise of their manifold powers, and are especially productive - which in this instance means creative - in the condition of freedom conferred by material plenty. But, in the production of interest to the theory of history, people produce not freely but because they have to, since nature does not otherwise supply their wants; and the development in history of the productive power of man (that is, of man as such, of man as a species) occurs at the expense of the creative capacity of the men who are agents and victims of that development.

The implication of this is that hence "one might ... imagine two kinds of creature, one whose essence it was to create and the other not, undergoing similarly toilsome histories because of similarly adverse circumstances. In one case, but not the other, the toil would be a self-alienating exercise of essential powers". Hence, "historical materialism and Marxist philosophical anthropology are independent of, though also consistent with, each other". Cohen, however, argues that human nature (and other "asocial premises") were sufficient for the development of the productive forces – it could be that they are only one necessary constituent. By 1988, Cohen appears to have considered that the problem was resolved.

=== Analytical Marxism ===
One important criticism of Marx's "philosophical anthropology" is offered by G.A. Cohen, the leader of analytical Marxism, in "Reconsidering Historical Materialism" (in Callinicos, ed., 1989). Cohen claims:

Marxist philosophical anthropology is one sided. Its conception of human nature and human good overlooks the need for self-identity than which nothing is more essentially human... Marx and his followers have underestimated the importance of phenomena, such as religion and nationalism, which satisfy the need for self-identity... In his anti-Hegelian, Feuerbachian affirmation of the radical objectivity of matter, Marx focused on the relationship of the subject to an object which is in no way subject, and, as time went on, he came to neglect the subject's relationship to itself, and that aspect of the subject's relationship to others which is a mediated (that is, indirect), form of relationship to itself.

Cohen believes that people are driven, typically, not to create identity, but to preserve that which they have in virtue, for example, of "nationality, or race, or religion, or some slice or amalgam thereof". Cohen does not claim that "Marx denied that there is a need for self-definition, but [instead claims that] he failed to give the truth due emphasis." Nor does Cohen say that the sort of self-understanding that can be found through religion etc. is accurate. Of nationalism, he says "identifications [can] take benign, harmless, and catastrophically malignant forms" and does not believe "that the state is a good medium for the embodiment of nationality".

In Cohen's Karl Marx's Theory of History (1978), he argues that human nature is necessary to explain the development of the productive forces, which Marx holds to drive history. This basic view is endorsed by Geras (1983) and (Wood 2004). The view, however, was criticised by Erik Olin Wright and Andrew Levine in an article entitled Rationality and Class Struggle, first published in the New Left Review. It can be found as chapter 1 of Marxist Theory (ed. Alex Callinicos, 1989). It was also criticised by Joshua Cohen, in a review of KMTH in the Journal of Philosophy.

G.A. Cohen draws out some difficulties with his own presentation in KMTH in the article "Reconsidering Historical Materialism". (First published 1983 in Marxism: NOMOS XXVI, ed. Chapman and Pennock; now available in Marxist Theory ed. Alex Callinicos, 1989; and in History, Labour, and Freedom, G.A. Cohen, 1988).

== See also ==
- Antihumanism
- Marx's theory of alienation
- Parametric determinism
