= Ivor R. Davies =

English composer, organist, and organ builder

Ivor R. Davies (1901 – 10 May 1970) was an English composer, organist, and organ builder. He won the Royal Academy of Music's Lucas Prize in 1926. Aside from various anthems for church use, his best known work is the 1967 SATB choral cycle Prayers from the Ark, which sets six of the 27 poems from the collection by Carmen Bernos de Gasztold.
