= Adèle Geras =

English writer

Adèle Geras FRSL
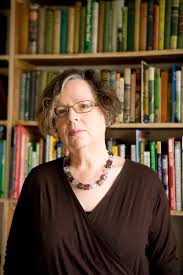
- An English writer for young children, teens and adults
- Born: Adèle Daphne Weston; 15 March 1944 (age 82); Jerusalem
- Occupation: Writer
- Spouse: Norman Geras (m. 1967; died 2013)
- Children: 2, including Sophie Hannah
- Writing career
- Period: 1975–present
- Genres: Adult and children's literature, poetry
- Website: adelegerasbooks.com

Adèle Daphne Geras (née Weston; born 15 March 1944) FRSL is an English writer for young children, teens and adults.

== Early life ==
Geras was born in Jerusalem, British Mandatory Palestine to British Jewish parents. Her father (later a lawyer and High Court judge in Tanganyika) was in the Colonial Service and she had a varied childhood, living in countries such as Nigeria, Cyprus, Tanganyika (now the mainland part of Tanzania), Gambia and British North Borneo in a short span of time. She attended Roedean School in Brighton and then graduated from St Hilda's College, Oxford with a degree in Modern Languages. She was known for her stage and vocal talents, but decided instead to become a full-time writer.

== Work ==
Geras's first book was Tea at Mrs Manderby's, which was published in 1976. Her first full-length novel was The Girls in the Velvet Frame. She has written more than 95 books for children, young adults, and adults. Other works include Troy (shortlisted for the Whitbread Prize and Highly Commended for the Carnegie Medal) Ithaka, Happy Ever After (previously published as the Egerton Hall Trilogy), Silent Snow, Secret Snow, and A Thousand Yards of Sea.

Her novels for adults include: Facing the Light, Hester's Story, Made in Heaven, and A Hidden Life.

In December 2020, Geras appeared as a member of the team from St Hilda's College Oxford in the Christmas Special of BBC Two's University Challenge.

== Awards ==
Geras won two prizes in the United States, the Sydney Taylor Book Award for the My Grandmother's Stories and the National Jewish Book Award for Golden Windows. She has also won prizes for her poetry and was a joint winner of the Smith Doorstop Poetry Pamphlet Award, offered by the publisher of that name. She was elected a Fellow of the Royal Society of Literature in 2014.

== Personal life ==
Geras's husband was the Marxist academic Norman Geras; they had two daughters, the novelist and poet Sophie Hannah, and Jenny, employed at Macmillan Publishers. They married two brothers.

== See also ==
- Paws and Whiskers – 2014 anthology that includes "Mimi's Day", a true poem which Geras wrote in 1999 about her tabby cat.
