= An Episode of Sparrows =

1955 novel by Rumer Godden

- First edition (US)
- Author: Rumer Godden
- Cover artist: George Salter
- Language: English
- Publisher: Viking Books (US); Macmillan (UK)
- Publication date: 1955 (US); 1956 (UK)
- Publication place: United Kingdom
- Media type: Print
- Pages: 247

An Episode of Sparrows is a novel written in 1955 by Rumer Godden. It was re-issued in 2016 in The New York Review Children's Collection.

== Plot summary ==
The novel focuses on children in Catford Street, a working-class street in South London, with much stone and asphalt but only a few patches of green. They are seen through the eyes of a pair of well-situated sisters in middle age, one sympathetic to the children, the other not. The main character is a difficult young girl named Lovejoy Mason, who is unofficially fostered by an aspiring restaurateur and his wife, with whom she has been left by her irresponsible mother, a sub-tenant of theirs.

Lovejoy finds a packet of cornflower seeds and plants a small garden in a wrecked churchyard otherwise filled with rubble from the Blitz. Although some other children dislike and humiliate her, Tip Malone, who heads a gang of local boys, comes to take an interest in Lovejoy and her project. Ultimately, several adults become involved in the children's lives as a result of Lovejoy's garden, with significant consequences for their future.

== Reception ==
The English children's writer Jacqueline Wilson, commenting on the 2014 reissue of the novel, recalled: "Lovejoy, Tip and Sparkey were so real to me that they have stayed alive in my head for more than 50 years.... An Episode of Sparrows was the first book that made me cry when I was ten. I cried all over again at this recent reading of the story — and I closed the book with the same sense of total satisfaction."

Similar praise has been expressed in the American press.

== Film adaptation ==
The British film Innocent Sinners (1958), directed by Philip Leacock, is based on the novel.
