= Filth: The Mary Whitehouse Story =

2008 British television film

- Genre: Drama
- Created by: Patrick Reams
- Written by: Amanda Coe
- Directed by: Andy DeEmmony
- Starring: Julie Walters; Alun Armstrong; Hugh Bonneville
- Composers: Nick Green; Tristin Norwell
- Country of origin: United Kingdom
- Original language: English

Production
- Executive producer: Leanne Klein
- Producer: Richard Burrell
- Running time: 90 minutes

Original release
- Network: BBC Two
- Release: 28 May 2008

Filth: The Mary Whitehouse Story is a 2008 British BBC Television drama written by Amanda Coe. Set in the 1960s, it recounts the initial campaigning activities of the British morality campaigner Mary Whitehouse. Julie Walters plays the part of Whitehouse, Alun Armstrong her husband Ernest, and Hugh Bonneville plays Sir Hugh Greene, the Director-General of the BBC, who is taken as embodying the liberalizing forces of the "permissive society" against which Whitehouse campaigned.

It was broadcast on 28 May 2008 on BBC Two, aired in the United States on 16 November 2008 as part of the Masterpiece series on PBS and was aired in Australia on 31 May 2009 on ABC1.

The script drew heavily on the Max Caulfield biography Mary Whitehouse (1976) and featured a degree of dramatic licence. For example, Whitehouse and others supposedly called their nascent group "Clean Up National TV" until her husband pointed out the unfortunate acronym - they then changed it to "Clean Up TV."

Among the many reviews published in the press were two contrasting examples in The Scotsman and The Sunday Times.

== Additional cast ==
- William Beck – David Turner, British playwright
- Nicholas Woodeson – Harman Grisewood, Assistant Director General of the BBC
- Emily Hamilton – Miss Tate
