= Breakfast with the Nikolides =

1942 novel

- First edition (UK)
- Author: Rumer Godden
- Language: English
- Genre: Drama
- Publisher: Peter Davies (UK); Little, Brown (US)
- Publication date: 1942
- Publication place: United Kingdom
- Media type: Print

Breakfast with the Nikolides is a 1942 novel by the British writer Rumer Godden. Like much of her work the story takes place in British India, where she lived for many years.

== Synopsis ==
After a decade apart, while she has been working in Paris and bringing up the children, a couple are reunited in India during the Second World War. They continue to quarrel as she wants to leave India while he is deeply committed to it.

== Bibliography ==
- Lassner, Phyllis (2004). Colonial Strangers: Women Writing the End of the British Empire. New Brunswick, N.J.: Rutgers University Press. ISBN 9780813534176.
- Le-Guilcher, Lucy; Lassner, Phyllis B., eds. (2010). Rumer Godden: International and Intermodern Storyteller. Farnham, Surrey: Ashgate. ISBN 9780754668282.
