= Troy (novel) =

2000 novel by Adèle Geras

- First edition (publ. Scholastic)
- Author: Adèle Geras
- Language: English
- Genre: Fantasy
- Publisher: Scholastic
- Publication date: 2000
- Publication place: United Kingdom

Troy is a young adult novel by Adèle Geras, published in 2000. It is based on events in The Iliad, incorporating original stories set in the heart of the city towards the end of the Trojan War. The novel was shortlisted for the Carnegie Medal, the Whitbread Award and the Guardian Award.

== Plot summary ==
It starts ten years into the Trojan War. Xanthe and Marpessa are sisters living in Troy, which is besieged by the Greeks. After Paris swept Helen away from her husband in Sparta to his home in Troy, Menelaus started a war to win her back. The Deities have already decided its outcome of the war. The Goddess Aphrodite, who started it all when she promised Paris the love of the most beautiful woman in the world, is tired of the war. Therefore, she turns her attention to the two sisters. When her son Eros, the God of Love, aims his love arrow, neither of the sisters can escape its power. They both fall in love with Alastor, a handsome fallen soldier with power.

The story is filled with encounters with Greek deities, which only Marpessa can remember.
