= Marx and Human Nature =

1983 book by Norman Geras

Marx and Human Nature: Refutation of a Legend
- Cover of the first edition
- Author: Norman Geras
- Language: English
- Subject: Marx's theory of human nature
- Publisher: Verso Books
- Publication date: 1983
- Publication place: United Kingdom
- Media type: Print (Paperback)
- Pages: 126
- ISBN: 978-1784782351

Marx and Human Nature: Refutation of a Legend is a 1983 book by the political theorist Norman Geras, in which the author discusses the philosopher Karl Marx's theory of human nature with reference to Marx's Sixth Thesis on Feuerbach. Geras argues that Marx did not deny the existence of a universal human nature, and maintains that the concept of human nature is compatible with historical materialism.

The book received positive reviews and is considered a classic.

== Summary ==
Geras discusses Karl Marx's Sixth Thesis on Feuerbach, which states of the philosopher Ludwig Feuerbach: "Feuerbach resolves the essence of religion into the essence of man. But the essence of man is no abstraction inherent in each single individual. In its reality it is the ensemble of social relations. Feuerbach, who does not enter upon a criticism of this real essence, is hence obliged: 1. To abstract from the historical process and to define the religious sentiment by itself, and to presuppose an abstract - isolated - human individual. 2. Essence, therefore, can be regarded only as 'species', as an inner, mute, general character which unites the many individuals in a natural way."

Geras maintains that the concept of human nature is compatible with historical materialism, and criticized Louis Althusser and his followers for popularizing a belief to the contrary. Geras is also critical of the Hungarian Marxist philosopher István Mészáros, finding his work Marx's Theory of Alienation (1970) to be an example of the way in which Marxists have illogically denied that human nature exists even while engaging in analysis of Marx that depends on the concept of a human nature.

Philosophers Geras takes a more favorable view of include the Croatian Gajo Petrović, author of Marx in the Mid-Twentieth Century (1965), and the Canadian G. A. Cohen, author of Karl Marx's Theory of History: A Defence (1978). Geras calls Cohen's book the leading philosophical discussion of the way in which the character of human beings in any setting depends upon the nature of the prevailing social relations.

== Publication history ==
Marx and Human Nature was first published by Verso Books in 1983.

== Reception ==
Marx and Human Nature received positive reviews from the political philosopher Steven Lukes in The Times Literary Supplement and the political scientist David McLellan in Political Studies. The book was also discussed by Joseph Fracchia in Historical Materialism.

Lukes found Geras's case that Marx did accept the concept of human nature convincing. McLellan found Geras's interpretation of Marx's Sixth Thesis on Feuerbach convincing, and wrote that his book showed "exemplary analytical rigour" and was a "most welcome and timely addition to the study of Marx." Fracchia argued that, like other authors who have attempted to offer a historical-materialist account of human nature, Geras was unsuccessful because he was "not materialistic enough" and failed to base his depiction of human nature in "human corporeal organisation".

The psychoanalyst Joel Kovel credited Geras with providing a thorough discussion of the Sixth Thesis on Feuerbach. He endorsed Geras's view that Marx had a definite conception of human nature, and unlike adherents of social constructionism did not believe that human being can be reduced to its relation with others. The political theorist Terrell Carver described Marx and Human Nature as a classic study of the question of whether Marx believed in human nature. The critic Terry Eagleton called the book "excellent".
