= Kingfishers Catch Fire =

1953 novel

- First edition (UK)
- Author: Rumer Godden
- Language: English
- Genre: Comedy
- Publisher: Macmillan (UK); Viking Press (US)
- Publication date: 1953
- Publication place: United Kingdom
- Media type: Print

Kingfishers Catch Fire is a 1953 comedy novel by the British writer Rumer Godden. It was partly inspired by her own time living in Kashmir. The title is taken from the poem by Gerard Manley Hopkins.

== Synopsis ==
After she is widowed and left with little money and two children, an independent-minded Englishwoman chooses to live in India rather than return to Britain. She is idealistically attracted to living a peasant lifestyle in a small village. A series of cultural misunderstandings follow with the local inhabitants.

== Bibliography ==
- Lassner, Phyllis (2004). Colonial Strangers: Women Writing the End of the British Empire. New Brunswick, N.J.: Rutgers University Press. ISBN 9780813534176.
- Le-Guilcher, Lucy; Lassner, Phyllis B., eds. (2010). Rumer Godden: International and Intermodern Storyteller. Farnham, Surrey: Ashgate. ISBN 9780754668282.
