= Carmen Bernos de Gasztold =

French poet (1919–1995)

- Born: October 9, 1919; Arcachon, France
- Died: September 23, 1995 (aged 75); Jouques, France
- Occupation: Poet

Carmen Bernos de Gasztold (9 October 1919 – 23 September 1995) was a French poet who lived in a Benedictine abbey.

Her most famous collection is titled Prayers from the Ark. The 1955 publication consists of short poems, each expressing a prayer from some animal on Noah's Ark. The book was translated into at least six languages, including an English version by Rumer Godden. Poet Marianne Moore praised the collection, but X. J. Kennedy criticized them as colorless and dull. Actor Marian Seldes recorded a spoken word album of the poems; composers Ivor R. Davies and Frieder Meschwitz set them to music.

A second volume of similar poems was published in 1965, entitled The Creatures Choir, also translated by Godden.

She spent her childhood in the province of Bordeaux, France. She had five sisters and brothers. After World War II she went to live at the Benedictine Abbaye Saint Louis du Temple at Limon.

Her family were of Lithuanian descent (Gasztold being the Polish rendering of the Lithuanian name Goštautas).

== Works ==
- Prières dans L'Arche, French & European Pubns, 1985, ISBN 978-0-685-11511-4
- Choral de Bêtes, French & European Pubns, 1985, ISBN 978-0-685-11121-5

=== English translation ===
- Prayers from the ark and the Creatures' choir, Carmen Bernos de Gasztold, Translator Rumer Godden, Penguin Books, 1976
  - Prayers from the ark: selected poems, Carmen Bernos de Gasztold, Translator Rumer Godden, Illustrator Barry Moser, Reprint Puffin Books, 1995, ISBN 9780140545852
- Bernos de Gasztold&f=false "The Prayer of the Dog", To absent friends: a collection of stories of the dogs we miss, Editor Jameson Parker, Willow Creek Press, 2004, ISBN 978-1-57223-706-3
