= Paws and Whiskers =

Anthology of dog and cat stories

- First edition cover
- Editor: Jacqueline Wilson
- Illustrator: Nick Sharratt
- Cover artist: Nick Sharratt
- Language: English
- Genre: Children's fiction
- Published: 13 February 2014 Doubleday, Random House Children's Publishers UK
- Publication place: United Kingdom
- Media type: Print (hardback and paperback) eBook (RHCP Digital)
- Pages: 387
- ISBN: 978-0857533524

Paws and Whiskers is a 2014 fundraising anthology for the Battersea Dogs and Cats Home, featuring children's stories about cats and dogs selected by Jacqueline Wilson, with illustrations by Nick Sharratt. Published 13 February 2014 by Doubleday Children's, the stories include new works and extracts from classics, such as The Hundred and One Dalmatians, by Dodie Smith, and Through the Looking Glass by Lewis Carroll.

Also called Battersea Cats and Dogs Anthology before publication, the book is under licence from "Battersea Dogs' Home Ltd.", with royalties from book sales going to support the charity.

Besides the Cat Stories and Dog Stories sections, the Pets' Corner section features new stories by notable children's authors about their pets.

== Extracts from the book ==
Catwings by Ursula K. Le Guin
The Daydreamer by Ian McEwan
Ice Lolly by Jean Ure
The Theatre Cat by Noel Streatfeild
Through the Looking Glass by Lewis Carroll
Gobbolino the Witch's Cat by Ursula Moray Williams
The Cat that Walked by Himself by Rudyard Kipling
Orlando's Invisible Pyjamas by Kathleen Hale
Soffrona and Her Cat Muff by Mary Martha Sherwood
Varjak Paw by S. F. Said
The Diary of a Killer Cat by Anne Fine
The Incredible Journey by Sheila Burnford
Osbert by Noel Streatfeild
A Dog So Small by Philippa Pearce
The Accidental Tourist by Anne Tyler
Love That Dog by Sharon Creech
The Hundred and One Dalmatians by Dodie Smith
Just William by Richmal Crompton
Born to Run by Michael Morpurgo
David Copperfield by Charles Dickens
Shadow, the Sheep-Dog by Enid Blyton
The Knife of Never Letting Go by Patrick Ness
Because of Winn-Dixie by Kate DiCamillo
The Werepuppy by Jacqueline Wilson

== Pets' Corner stories ==
The "Pets' Corner" section of the book is where famous authors (such as Horrid Henry's Francesca Simon and The Magic Faraway Tree's Enid Blyton) talk about their pets.

Title of Article	Name (author)	Name (pet)	Breed	Dog or Cat
Tuffy	Anne Fine	Tuffy	Unknown	Cat (featured in The Diary of a Killer Cat)
Our Dogs	Philip Pullman	Daisy, Hoagy and Nellie	Two Pugs and one Lurcher	Dogs
Pekingese	Rumer Godden	Piers (deceased)	Pekingese	Dog
Mimi's Day	Adéle Geras	Mimi (Meems) (deceased)	Tabby	Cat
Pets I Have Had	Enid Blyton	Bobs, (dog) Sandy (dog), many nameless puppies (last one was Topsy), Lassie (dog), Laddie (dog) Bimbo (dog) and Rufus (cat)	Fox Terrier, Cocker Spaniel and Tabby.	Dogs and Cats
My Pets	Michael Morpurgo	Prynne, Puck, Katie and her puppies, Arthur, Hal and Galadriel, Sophie and Bercelet, Snug and Bottom, Mini, Simpson and Leo	Prynne, (Labrador Retriever-cross) Puck (Shetland Sheepdog Katie (Irish Setter) Sophie (English Setter)	Cats and Dogs
Dog Memory	Malorie Blackman	Taquis (deceased)	German Shepherd	Dog
My Animal Friends	Dick King-Smith	Anna, Dodo and Elsie	Dachshunds	Dog
Cats	Joan Aiken	Gracchus, Hamlet and Darwin	One Tabby cat, others unknown	Cat
Shanti	Francesca Simon	Shanti (deceased)	Tibetan Spaniel	Dog
My Pets	Jean Ure	Thomas, Titch, Bella, (cats), Dolly, Daisy, Minnie, Gertie, Benny, Sasha.	Fox Terrier, Tabby, Mongrel, Jack Russell, Norfolk Terrier, Springer Spaniel, German Shepherd-Collie	Cats and Dogs

== Reception ==
CBBC has done a book club report on it by Katie Thistleton, citing part of it as a "brilliant read". In The Guardian newspaper review, Kat Winter has given it an 8.5 out of ten, commenting on the fact the stories were too short, she wanted to find out more.

== See also ==
- Dogs Trust
- RSPCA
- Blue Cross
