= Marx's theory of alienation =

Social theory developed by Karl Marx

Diagram illustrating Marx's theory of alienation

Marx's theory of alienation describes the estrangement of people from aspects of their essential human nature as a consequence of living in a society structured by private property and wage labour. Developed by the German philosopher Karl Marx and first articulated in his Economic and Philosophic Manuscripts of 1844, the theory is a foundational concept of Marxism. At its core, it posits that under the capitalist mode of production, workers are inevitably separated from the products they create, the activity of production, their fellow human beings, and their own creative potential.

The theory has roots in a long intellectual tradition, particularly in the work of the German idealist philosopher Georg Wilhelm Friedrich Hegel. For Hegel, alienation was a necessary stage in the development of Spirit (Geist), in which it externalises itself in the material world to achieve self-awareness. Marx adapted Hegel's dialectical framework but rejected its idealism, grounding the concept in material reality. Influenced by Ludwig Feuerbach's critique of religious alienation, Marx argued that alienation was not an abstract philosophical condition but a concrete, historical consequence of the capitalist system that could be overcome.

In his analysis, Marx identified four key aspects of alienated labour. First, the worker is alienated from the product of their labour, which is appropriated by the capitalist and confronts the worker as a hostile power. Second, they are alienated from the activity of production itself, which is experienced not as a fulfilling expression of creativity but as coerced, meaningless toil. Third, this leads to alienation from their own human nature, or species-being (Gattungswesen), as free, conscious activity is reduced to a mere means of survival. Finally, the worker is alienated from other people, as social relationships become reified and mediated by market exchange, fostering competition and indifference rather than community.

A long-standing scholarly debate exists over the theory's place in Marx's work, with some arguing he abandoned the humanistic concept in his later, more "scientific" writings. However, many analysts contend that the theory remained a central, unifying concept throughout his intellectual development. They argue that concepts in his mature work, such as the fetishism of commodities in Das Kapital, represent a deeper elaboration of the alienation theme. For Marx, the overcoming of alienation could only be achieved through communism, a revolutionary transformation of society that would abolish private property and allow for the free, collective development of human potential.

== Antecedents of the theory ==
The concept of alienation has a long history in Western thought, reflecting what scholar István Mészáros describes as "objective trends of European development, from slavery to the age of transition from capitalism to socialism".

More primitive forms of alienation, according to George Novack, arose from the disparity between human needs and the lack of control over nature, a helplessness expressed through magic and religion. In religion, the real relationship is reversed: man creates gods in his own image, but then prostrates himself before these creations as if they had created him. In Judeo-Christian mythology, alienation is expressed as separation from God, originating with the "fall of man". In this framework, humanity's self-alienation is a state from which it must be rescued. Christianity proposes an imaginary solution to this alienation through universality, reconciling the contradictions that set people against one another. Marx viewed this as an "abstract-theoretical" universality that contrasted with the "crude realism" of Judaism, which reflects the state of worldly affairs more directly. He argued that the "spirit of Judaism", with its practical, self-centred partiality, provided a vehicle for the development of capitalism, which reaches its perfection in the Christian world where civil society is completely separated from the state.

The secularization of the concept progressed with the rise of capitalism, where all things, no matter how sacred, were converted into saleable objects. Thinkers of the Enlightenment began to frame the problem in social and historical terms. The term was used by social contract theorists such as Hugo Grotius and John Locke to describe the act of "alienating" or surrendering personal sovereignty to the state. Jean-Jacques Rousseau, a major influence, provided a powerful social critique of private property, inequality, and the dehumanising effects of "civilization". Rousseau argued that the "complete alienation" of each individual's rights and liberties to the community as a whole was the necessary basis for a just society. However, he saw the alienation of sovereignty to an individual or small group as a degradation of one's being. Rousseau's solutions remained in the realm of an abstract moral "ought", idealising a state of nature while accepting private property as a sacred foundation of civil society, thereby trapping his critique in an insoluble contradiction.

=== Hegel's theory of alienation ===
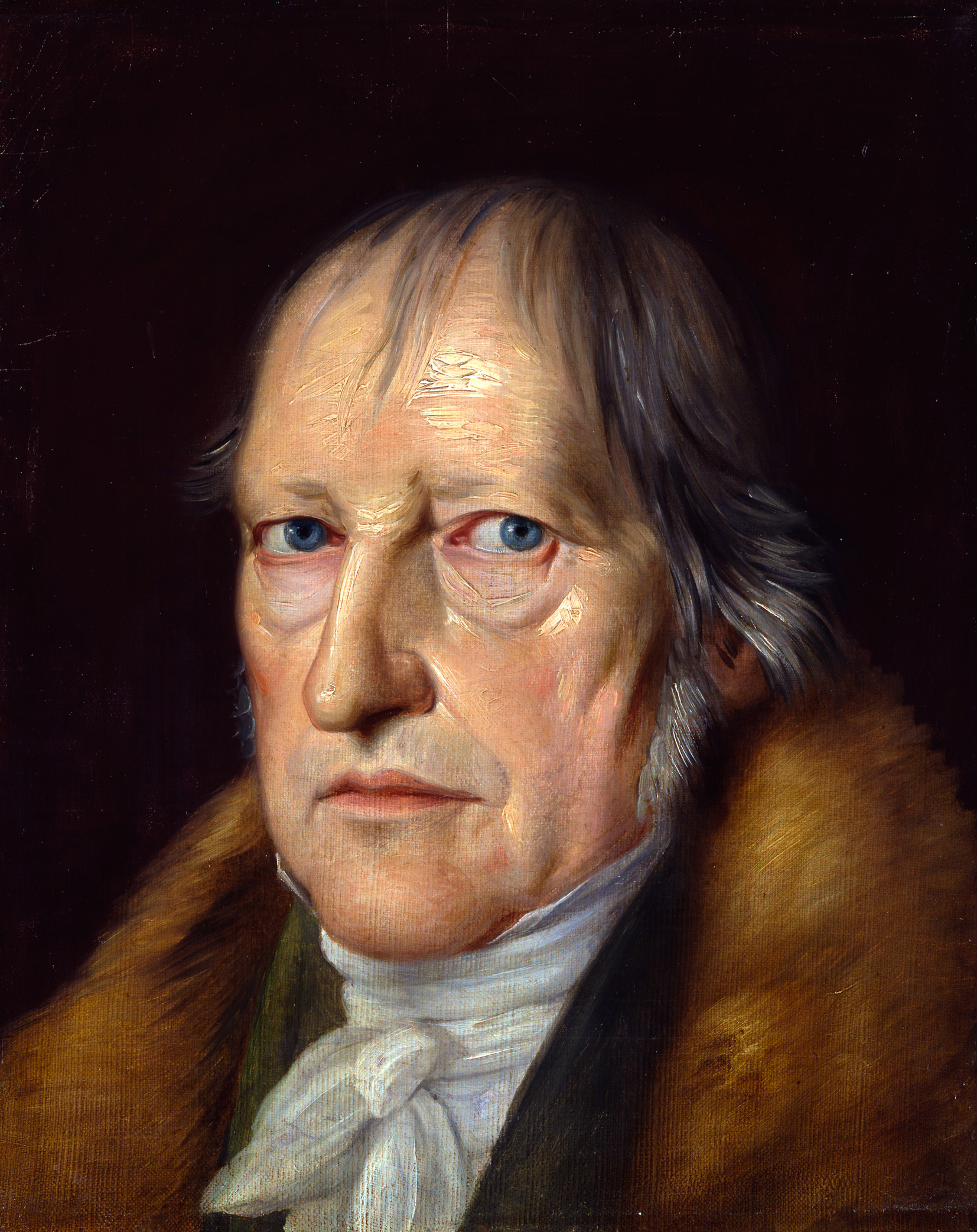
Georg Friedrich Wilhelm Hegel

The German idealist philosopher Georg Wilhelm Friedrich Hegel adapted the concept of alienation (Entfremdung). His predecessors, such as Friedrich Schiller, discussed themes of social fragmentation and the division of humanity. Early in his career, Hegel described industrial society as "a vast system of mutual interdependence, a moving life of the dead. This system moves hither and yon in a blind elementary way, and like a wild animal calls for strong permanent control and curbing." Hegel used Entfremdung in two distinct senses: first, as a sense of separation or discord, such as that between an individual and society, and second, as an act of surrender or sacrifice, such as the individual surrendering their particular will to the universal will of the community. For Hegel, the first sense of alienation (discord) is overcome through the second (surrender), leading to a higher form of unity.

For Hegel, man is alienated because human labour is alienated. He identified two reasons for this: first, the "dialectics of need and labor", where human needs are always one step ahead of the resources to satisfy them, condemning people to a perpetual, unsatisfying cycle of work; and second, the process of "externalization" (Entäusserung), where humans create objects that become separate from them and can never be as much a part of them as the ideas that produced them. For Hegel, this results in an "unhappy consciousness" where man is doomed to frustration unless the severed parts of his world—subject and object, reason and reality—can be reunited.

Hegel also used the term Entäusserung (externalisation or objectification) to describe the process of the Spirit (Geist) becoming aware of itself. For Hegel, alienation was identical to objectification, a necessary stage in the development of the Absolute Idea where the Spirit externalises itself in the objective world. This process culminates in the Spirit's "reconciliation" with itself, overcoming the alienation by recognising the objective world as its own creation. However, according to Mészáros, this supersession (Aufhebung) is a purely conceptual one, an "imaginary transcendence" that leaves the actual material conditions of society unchanged. Hegel's standpoint remains that of political economy, an "uncritical positivism" that accepts the foundations of capitalist society.

While Marx rejected Hegel's idealism, he retained his relational framework, which was based on the philosophy of internal relations, but applied it to the material world of social and economic activity. Marx transformed Hegel's concept from an eternal, anthropological notion into a transitory, historical one, arguing that while objectification is a universal aspect of labour, alienation is a specific result of commodity production and can be overcome.

== Development in Marx's thought ==
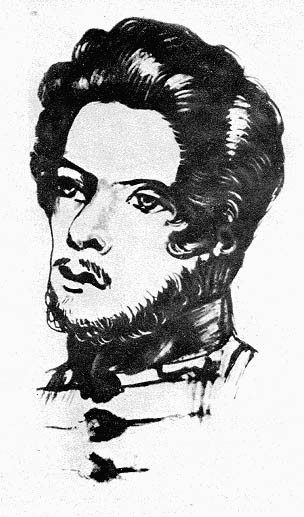
Depiction of the young Karl Marx

Marx developed his theory of alienation over several years of intellectual engagement with philosophy, law, politics, and economics. His fascination with the term "alienation" stemmed from its dual role in Hegelian philosophy, where it described the development of the Spirit, and in political economy, where it referred to the transfer of property. Another significant influence was Ludwig Feuerbach, whose theory of religious alienation, presented in The Essence of Christianity (1841), argued that humans project their own essential qualities onto a divine being, thereby alienating themselves from their own nature. Marx's project was to apply Feuerbach's "transformative method" to Hegel, reducing the abstract concept of alienation to its concrete basis in economic activity.

In his 1841 doctoral thesis, Marx analysed Epicurean philosophy as an expression of a historical stage dominated by the "privatization of life" and the principle of bellum omnium contra omnes ("the war of all against all"), an early formulation of the atomistic nature of bourgeois society. According to Ernest Mandel, Marx's engagement with alienation began with the political alienation of the citizen from the state, to which he shifted his focus in his subsequent journalistic work. Incidents such as new laws criminalising the collection of firewood by peasants in the Rhine province led Marx to conclude that the state represented the interests of private property owners, leading to a forfeiture of rights by the general populace to a hostile institution.

A major turning point occurred in late 1843 and early 1844, when Marx moved to Paris and intensified his studies of the French Revolution and English political economy. In his essay "On the Jewish Question", he expanded his critique beyond the state to the entirety of bourgeois society, identifying money as a key alienating force that mediates all human relations. In his "Critique of Hegel's Philosophy of Right", Marx declared that the critique of religion must become the critique of law and politics, and ultimately, that the emancipation of man required the overthrow of "all those conditions in which man is an abased, enslaved, abandoned, contemptible being". He identified a fundamental contradiction in modern society: the divorce of the individual's "objective being" from the community, reducing social ties to merely external determinations and individual existence to the ultimate end. It was here that he first identified the proletariat as the historical agent of universal human emancipation.

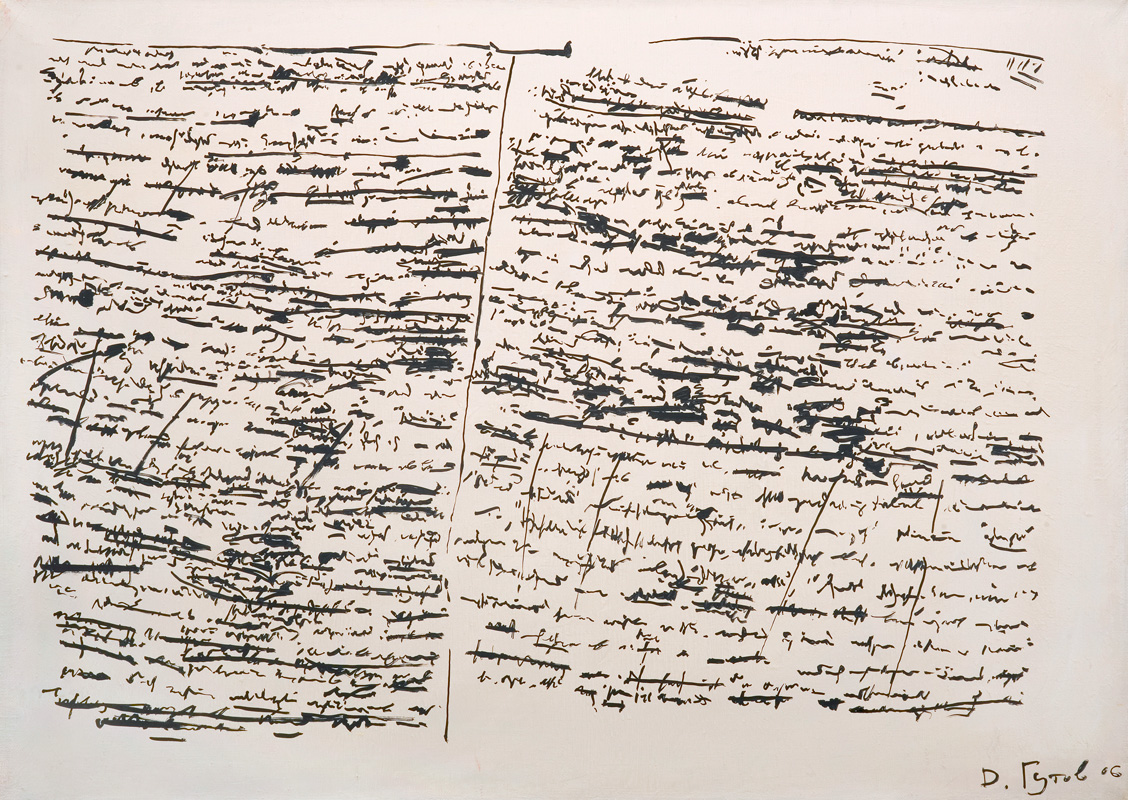
Page from the Economic and Philosophic Manuscripts of 1844

The definitive synthesis of these ideas occurred in the Economic and Philosophic Manuscripts of 1844. Influenced by Friedrich Engels's "Outlines of a Critique of Political Economy", and the writings of Moses Hess, Marx located the root of all forms of alienation in alienated labour (entfremdete Arbeit). This concept became the "Archimedean point" of his entire system, allowing him to ground his critique of capitalism in the concrete, material process of production and to reformulate the problem of transcendence not as a philosophical "ought" but as a practical, historical necessity. The Manuscripts constitute what Mészáros calls Marx's "first comprehensive system" and a "synthesis in statu nascendi" (in a nascent state), which systematically explores the far-reaching implications of the alienation of labour in every sphere of human activity.

== The theory of alienation ==
Marx's theory is grounded in his conception of human nature and its distortion by capitalism. He views man not as an isolated individual but as a social being whose essence is realised through productive activity, or labour. According to scholar Bertell Ollman, to understand alienation, one must first grasp Marx's philosophy of internal relations, which posits that entities are constituted by their connections to other entities in a dynamic, organic whole. From this perspective, alienation is the process by which these internally related components of human nature are "splintered", "separated", and reorganised to appear as independent and even hostile to one another. Fusing Hegel's two senses of alienation, Marx developed a single concept of "separation through surrender", where every form of alienation is rooted in the surrender of control over one's labour to another person.

In contrast to Hegel, Marx conceived of alienation not as an ontological condition of labour, but as a specific phenomenon occurring within the historical context of capitalism and wage labour, which could be overcome through "the emancipation of society from private property". Alienation can only be comprehended as the absence of a future state of unalienation—communism—which serves as the point of reference for the critique. Thus, alienation is not a moral judgment but a "statement of 'fact'" about the separation of humanity from its own potential.

=== Four aspects of alienation ===
In the Economic and Philosophic Manuscripts of 1844, Marx identified four principal aspects of alienated labour in capitalist society.

1. Alienation of the worker from their product: The worker produces an object that they do not own or control. The product of their labour is "but the summary of the activity, of production", and it confronts them as "something alien, as a power independent of the producer". The more the worker produces, the more they are dominated by their creation, capital. This relationship is summed up by Marx as "the devaluation of the world of men" proceeding in direct proportion to "the increasing value of the world of things". The objectification of labour appears as a loss of the object; the worker "puts his life into the object; but now his life no longer belongs to him but to the object". This product stands as an "alien and hostile object" because it belongs to another and because it strengthens the "inhuman power" of economic laws that oppress the worker. According to Mandel, the products of labour can turn against the worker in the form of machines that create a "source of tyranny" or in economic crises where people suffer not because they produce too little, but because they produce too much.
2. Alienation of the worker from the activity of production: The work that the worker performs does not belong to them but is a means to an end. It is "coerced labour", not a voluntary act of self-fulfilment. It is "not the satisfaction of a need; it is merely a means to satisfy needs external to it". The activity itself is alien, "forced labour", and does not offer satisfaction; it "mortifies his body and ruins his mind". Consequently, the worker "only feels himself outside his work, and in his work feels outside himself". This is self-estrangement (Selbstentfremdung). The labour is not spontaneous but is directed by an "alien will", that of the capitalist, making it "the loss of his own self". All the time sold to the employer belongs to the employer, who dictates the worker's every action, a form of control perfected in time and motion studies.
3. Alienation of the worker from their species-being: For Marx, humanity's "species-being" (Gattungswesen) is its essence as a free, conscious, and creative producer. Humans, unlike animals, produce universally and can contemplate themselves in a world they have created. Alienated labour reduces this free, conscious activity to a mere means for individual physical existence. It estranges man's "own body from him, as it does external nature and his spiritual existence, his human being". The human "capacity to perform creative work, becomes thwarted and distorted", as the worker's special traits and abilities are not needed or developed. The "unique configuration of relations which distinguishes the individual as a human being has been transformed into something quite different". The worker is dehumanised, reduced to the level of an animal or a machine in their productive life, a slave in their social life, and possessing a merely brutish, uncultivated sensibility. The critique is not that capitalism violates a pre-existing fixed nature, but that it actively produces an alienated one, as the dominant mode of production gives rise to the very construction of consciousness and personality.
4. Alienation of the worker from other people: Since the worker's own activity and its product are alien to them, their relationship with other people is also alienated. "An immediate consequence of the fact that man is estranged from the product of his labour, from his life-activity, from his species being is the estrangement of man from man." The product of the worker's labour belongs to another person—the capitalist—establishing an inherently antagonistic relationship. More broadly, human relations in general become reified, mediated by the exchange of commodities and money rather than by direct human connection. This leads to a breakdown in human communication and fosters a "tremendous loneliness". In the "war of all against all" of civil society, each person views others not as fellows but as rivals and adversaries.

== Aspects of the theory ==
Marx's theory of alienation extends beyond a purely economic critique to encompass the totality of social existence under capitalism.

=== Economic aspects ===
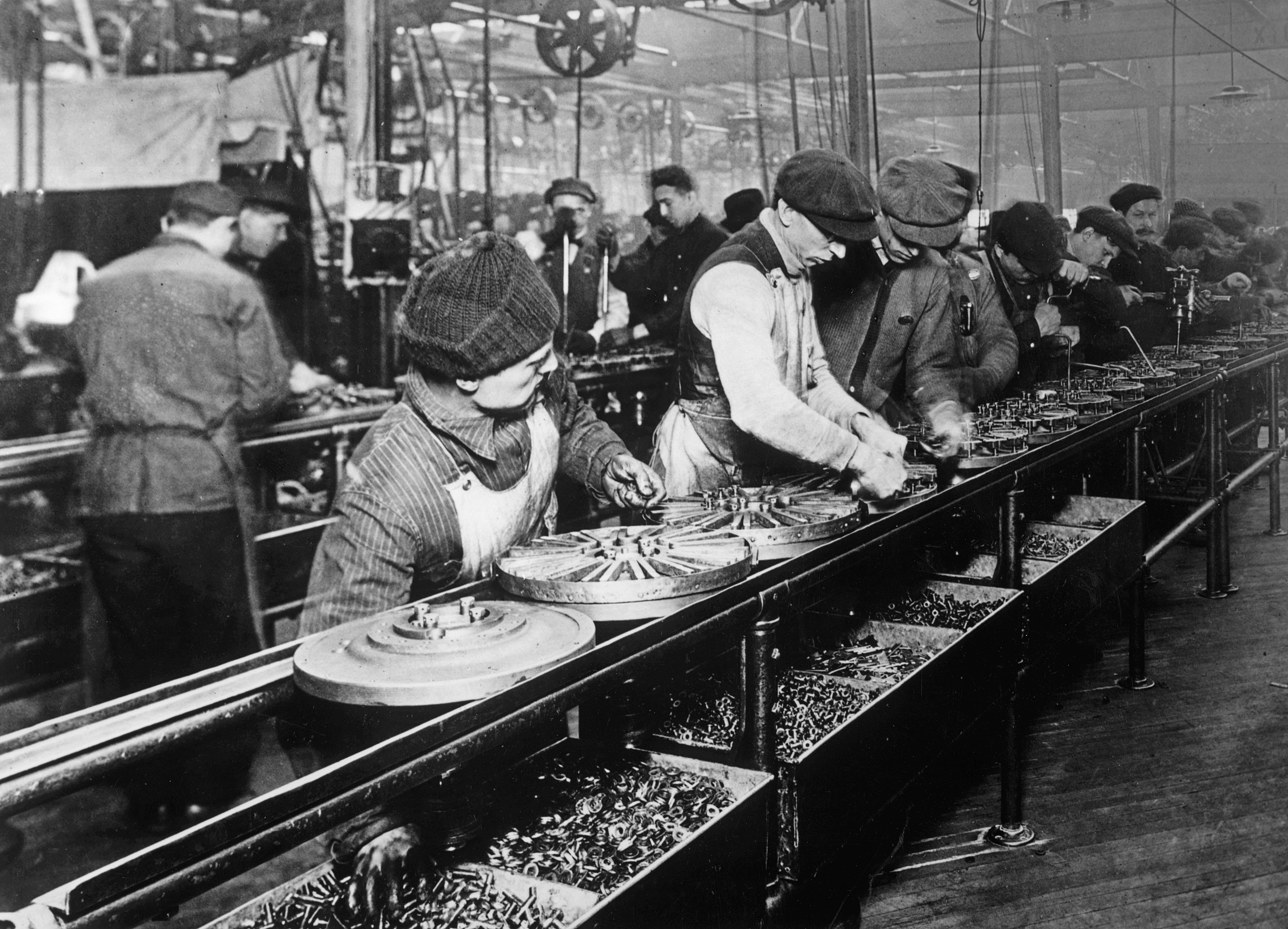
The Ford Motor Company assembly line in 1913, an example of the capitalist division of labour that intensifies alienation. Workers perform repetitive, fragmented tasks, losing control over the production process and the final product.

The economic foundation of alienation lies in the division of labour under the system of private property and exchange. Political economists, Marx argued, mistook the historically specific, alienating division of labour for the universal "social character of labour". For Marx, the division of labour and private property are "identical expressions": the former describes the estranged activity, while the latter describes the estranged product. The historical precondition for alienated labour is the separation of people from free access to the means of production and subsistence, which forces them into wage labour. The system is governed by competition, which necessitates reification (Verdinglichung), the transformation of human beings and their relations into things. Workers become commodities, bought and sold according to the laws of supply and demand. This reification permeates daily life, as when service workers come to see customers not as people but as the orders they represent. Labour itself becomes abstract labour, a one-sided, machine-like activity, and the system fosters "inhuman, refined, unnatural and imaginary appetites" in the consumer that serve the accumulation of wealth rather than human fulfilment.

=== Political and moral aspects ===
Alienation has profound political and moral dimensions. Capitalist property relations negate human freedom. For Marx, this negation is rooted in the principle that a person's labour properly belongs to themselves; its expropriation by another is the basis of exploitation and the loss of freedom. Politically, the modern state is an "illusory community", an "abstracted social power" that stands over and against atomised individuals. While formally guaranteeing "equal rights" for all citizens, the state serves to protect private property and thus sanctions a lack of freedom in real terms. Human activity within this framework becomes "forced labour" under the yoke of another. Morally, alienation overturns human values. The system subordinates "being" to "having"; the "sense of having" replaces the full range of human senses. Money becomes the "universal galvano-chemical power of Society", the ultimate mediator that "transforms fidelity into infidelity, love into hate, hate into love, virtue into vice". The supersession of alienation, therefore, requires a radical political project: the "emancipation of the workers" which coincides with "universal human emancipation".

=== Overcoming alienation ===
For Marx, the overcoming of alienation is synonymous with the establishment of communism. He conceived of this new society not as a utopian ideal, but as the real movement that abolishes the present state of things. The fundamental source of alienation, he argued, was "egoistic need" (both physical need and greed), which was itself a product of the nature of civil society and the institution of private property. Consequently, the eradication of alienation could only be accomplished by changing the socioeconomic system.

This would not be a regression to a primitive state of poverty, but the creation of a society that harnesses the productive forces developed by capitalism for the "full and free development of every individual". The gradual disappearance of alienation requires the withering away of commodity production, economic scarcity, and the social division of labour (particularly between manual and intellectual labour). The abolition of private property and the division of labour would allow for the emergence of an "association of free men, working with the means of production held in common". Labour would be transformed from a coercive means of survival into a "conscious, creative activity", and the reduction of the working day would create disposable time for the "artistic, scientific etc. development of the individuals", moving humanity from the "realm of necessity" to the "true realm of freedom". For Novack, the goal of communism is the achievement of "free time for all", which becomes the measure of wealth and the "annihilator of alienation".

== Role in Marx's corpus ==
A long-standing controversy surrounds the place of the theory of alienation in Marx's work, often framed as an opposition between a "young Marx" (the philosopher of alienation) and a "mature Marx" (the scientific political economist). Proponents of a "break" in Marx's development, such as the philosopher Louis Althusser, argue that he abandoned the humanistic and Hegelian-influenced concept of alienation in his later writings, replacing it with a more "scientific" analysis of economic structures.

However, other scholars argue for a fundamental continuity in Marx's thought, asserting that the theory of alienation is not a youthful aberration but a central idea of his entire system. Scholars such as Barry Padgett contend that the differentiation between a "young" and "mature" Marx, with the suggestion that the latter jettisons the concept, is a "false dichotomy". Mandel argues that there was an "important evolution" in Marx's thought rather than a radical break or simple repetition. Ollman suggests that the apparent change in terminology after 1844 is "overdone" and that even in his later economic works, Marx frequently resorted to the concepts and framework of his early writings when making connections across different disciplines. The ironic remarks about "estrangement" in works like The German Ideology and The Communist Manifesto are not a rejection of the concept itself, but a critique of its abstract, idealist use by Marx's contemporaries, who divorced it from concrete social practice.

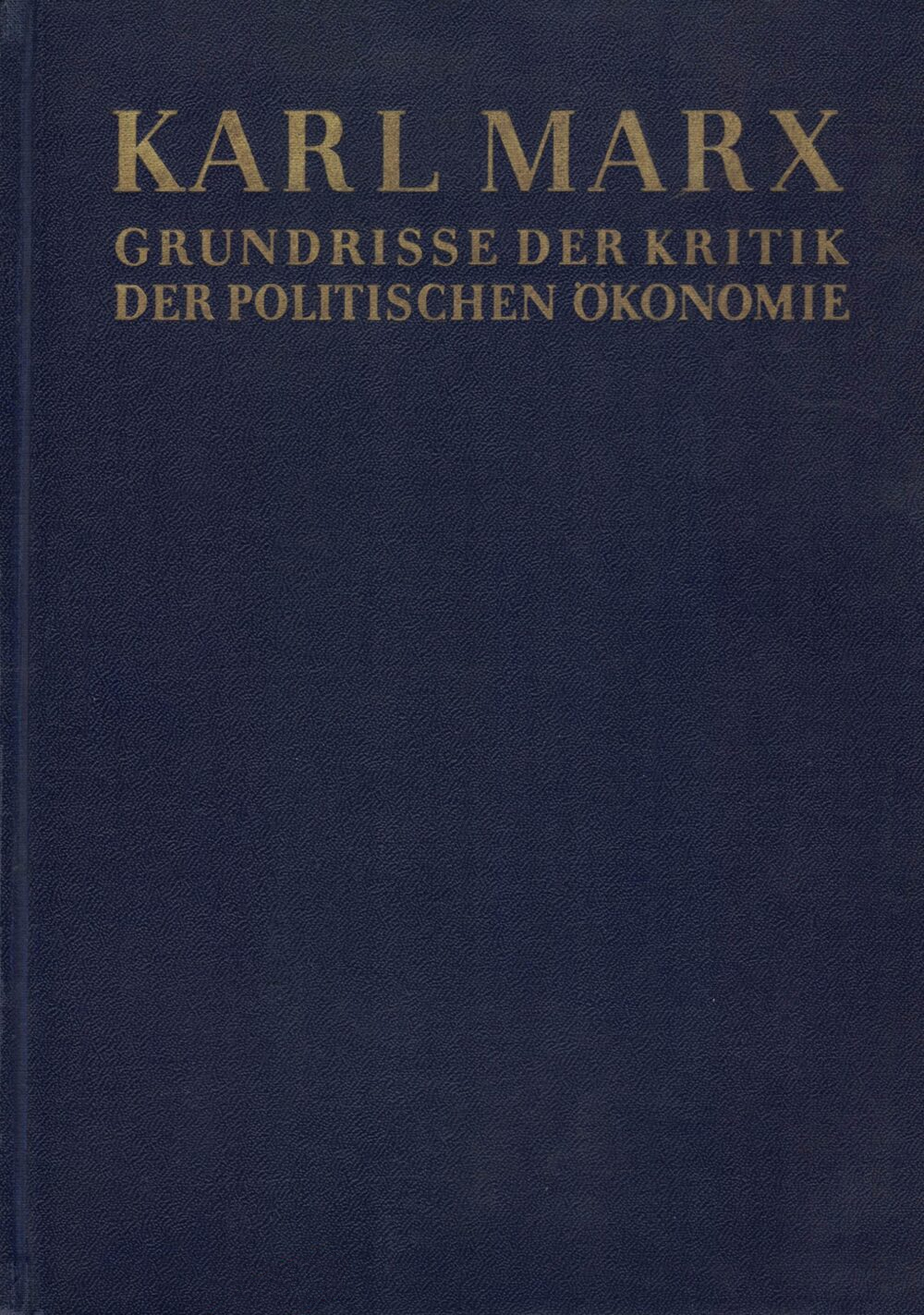
The Grundrisse, written in 1857–58, is frequently cited by scholars as key evidence that alienation remained a central concept in Marx's mature economic writings.

According to these scholars, far from dropping the concept, Marx's later works concretise and elaborate the theory. While the specific term Entfremdung becomes less frequent in his published works like Das Kapital, the underlying conceptual structure remains. In works such as the Grundrisse (the rough draft for Das Kapital), the concept of alienation is massively present, linking the economic categories directly to the alienation of labour. For example, in the Grundrisse, Marx writes that the "immense objective power set up by social labour... does not belong to the worker but to the personified conditions of production, i.e. to capital... this perversion and overturning is real, not imagined". The publication of the notebooks in the mid-20th century was decisive in demonstrating this continuity.

Similarly, in Das Kapital itself, concepts like the fetishism of commodities and the domination of dead labour (capital) over living labour are direct elaborations of the theory of alienation. For Marx, fetishism is not a subjective problem but a "real power, a particular form of domination" that arises in a market economy. As Novack argues, the early concept of "alienated labor" was later developed into more precise economic categories, such as the distinction between concrete and abstract labour. Marx's life's work is thus seen as a single, coherent project: the analysis of the capitalist mode of production as a system of alienated labour and the articulation of the historical possibility of its transcendence.

== See also ==
- Marxist humanism
- Commodification
