= The Diddakoi =

1972 novel for children by Rumer Godden

- First edition
- Author: Rumer Godden
- Illustrator: Creina Glegg
- Genre: Children's novel Domestic fiction
- Publisher: Macmillan (UK); Viking (US)
- Publication date: 1972
- Publication place: United Kingdom
- Pages: 140
- ISBN: 0-333-13848-1
- LC Class: PZ7.G54 Di; PZ3.G5422 Di3

The Diddakoi is a 1972 children's novel by Rumer Godden. Set in England, it features an orphan traveller or Romani girl, seven-year-old Kizzy Lovell, who faces persecution, grief, and loss in a hostile, close-knit, village community. The title is an alternative spelling of "didicoy", the Angloromani term for a person of mixed ancestry.

The Diddakoi won the 1972 Whitbread Award in the Children's Book category, honouring the year's best English-language work by a writer based in Britain or Ireland. It was dramatised as a television serial, Kizzy (1976), which was produced by Dorothea Brooking for the BBC, with Vanessa Furst as Kizzy. Decades later it was adapted as a BBC radio drama of the same name, with Nisa Cole in the lead role.

HarperCollins republished the novel in 2002 under the title Gypsy Girl.
