= Jon Godden =

English novelist (1906–1984)

- Born: Winsome Ruth Key Godden; August 1906; Assam, India
- Died: 1984
- Occupation: Novelist
- Spouse: Roland Oakley
- Relatives: Rumer Godden
- Writing career
- Notable work: The House by the Sea

Winsome Ruth Key Godden (August 1906 – 1984) was an English novelist who wrote under the name Jon Godden. She was born in Assam, India. She was the elder sister of the better-known novelist Rumer Godden.

== Early life ==
The eldest of four daughters of Arthur Leigh Godden, an agent for a British steamer company in what is now Bangladesh, and Katherine Norah Hingley, Jon Godden spent almost all of her childhood and much of her adult life in India. She and her sister Rumer were sent to England for their education at the ages of 7 and 6, but the outbreak of World War I caused their parents to arrange their travel to Narayanganj, to which their father had been transferred from Assam while they were abroad. They remained there until Jon was 13, the experience later forming the basis of Two Under the Indian Sun, an autobiographical work jointly written by Jon and her sister Rumer.

Although all four of the Godden daughters were interested in writing, Jon and Rumer were serious about it from an early age. In addition, Jon revealed substantial artistic talent, winning a gold medal intended for adult entrants at an art exhibition in Gulmarg, in Kashmir. Her parents were advised by the professional who had judged the exhibition that she had a future as an artist and that they should eventually send her to The Slade in London. Jon's abilities and good looks, as well as her position as the eldest daughter in the Godden family, meant that she exercised great emotional power over her younger siblings throughout her life and that she was always regarded within the family as the most talented sister, if not the most productive.

In 1920, the Goddens returned to England—Arthur Godden only temporarily, since he had to return to his position in India—and settled in Eastbourne. The children were enrolled in a series of schools, beginning with a High Anglican convent boarding school, where they were not a good fit, having been privately tutored by an aunt in India. They also had difficulty adjusting to a less lavish lifestyle than they had enjoyed under the British Raj. In 1925, however, now in their late teens (and Jon, though having studied at a provincial art school, apparently having given up on any plans to become a professional artist), Jon and Rumer traveled back to India, where Jon fell in love with Nigel Baughan, an employee of Imperial Tobacco. She became engaged to Baughan, but he could not immediately marry, owing to the terms of his employment (common for young British bachelors in India at the time). However, the couple married in secret during a leave that Baughan took in England, this only revealed when he was dying of septicaemia back in India in 1930.

Devastated by Baughan's death, Jon continued to live with her parents in India; at the time, young, unmarried, British women did not normally live on their own, and Jon did not establish an independent career. However, she began to see Calcutta businessman Roland Oakley. Though she returned to England with her now-retired father and her mother in the spring of 1936 and briefly stayed with them in Totnes, Devon, she soon set off back to India with Rumer, who had married and established a Calcutta dancing school. In October 1936, Jon married Roland Oakley in St. Paul's Cathedral, Calcutta. The couple chose to live in India and, later, to remain there after Indian Independence in 1947.

== Career ==
Unlike her sister Rumer, whose first marriage was financially disastrous and required Rumer to work hard at her writing to support herself and her children, Jon Godden had, at least temporarily, a successful husband able and willing to support her, and she was not enthusiastic about competing in the literary world. She did not publish her first novel, The Bird Escaped, until 1947, and it was Rumer who persuaded her own literary agents, Curtis Brown, to handle it.

Jon's novel, The House by the Sea, was published in the fall of 1948 by Michael Joseph. As Rumer's biographer Anne Chisholm notes, "it was much admired for its psychological insight and morbid, powerful atmosphere. It was, indeed, as Jon's novels continued to be – she published ten in all over the next thirty years – much cooler in style and darker in content than Rumer's later books." As Chisholm further points out, Jon was praised by critics but was little interested in the "market place," since she had no need to earn a living, owing to her financially stable marriage.

However, Jon's life changed drastically when her marriage to Oakley, under strain for some years, suddenly ended. In 1957, she returned to England, inexperienced with handling money and in financial distress. She moved into a cottage on the grounds of the property in Kent that her parents had purchased with Rumer's assistance and remained there until her death.

== Later years ==
In later years, while still producing fiction, Jon collaborated with Rumer on non-fiction books, including the very well received Two Under the Indian Sun (1966) and Shiva's Pigeons (1972), for which the sisters wrote the text to accompany Stella Snead's black-and-white photographs of Indian life, culture, and landscape.

== Death ==
In 1984, after suffering ill-health for an extended period, Jon Godden died at the age of 78. After her death, in 1989, Rumer published Indian Dust, a collection of stories and poems set in India and written by her and by Jon, some as early as 50 years previously.

== Works ==
- 1947 The Bird Escaped
- 1947 The House by the Sea
- 1950 The Peacock
- 1954 The City and the Wave
- 1956 The Seven Islands
- 1959 Mrs. Panopoulis
- 1961 Winter's Tale (also published as Told in Winter)
- 1965 In the Sun
- 1966 Two Under the Indian Sun (written with Rumer Godden)
- 1968 Gone: A Thread of Stories (written with Rumer Godden)
- 1971 Kitten with Blue Eyes (US title: Mrs. Starr Lives Alone)
- 1972 Shiva's Pigeons (written with Rumer Godden)
- 1975 Ahmed and the Old Lady (also published as Ahmed's Lady)
- 1981 In Her Garden
- 1989 Indian Dust (also published as Mercy, Pity, Peace and Love: Stories) (written with Rumer Godden)
