= Kizzy (TV series) =

1976 British children's TV series

- Opening title
- Based on: The Diddakoi by Rumer Godden
- Written by: John Tully
- Directed by: David Tilley
- Starring: Vanessa Furst; Anne Ridler
- Composer: Peter Gosling
- Country of origin: United Kingdom
- Original language: English
- No. of series: 1
- No. of episodes: 6

Production
- Producer: Dorothea Brooking
- Cinematography: John Turner
- Editor: Bill Wright
- Running time: 30 minutes
- Production company: BBC Birmingham

Original release
- Network: BBC1
- Release: 21 January – 25 February 1976

Kizzy is the name given to the 1976 BBC adaptation of Rumer Godden's 1972 novel The Diddakoi (a.k.a. The Gypsy Girl). It starred Vanessa Furst as the title character and was produced by Dorothea Brooking.

It is the story of an orphan traveller or Romani girl called Kizzy, who faces persecution, grief and loss in a hostile, close-knit village community. This is a moving tale of human fallibility and sorrow, but also of strength, courage and redemption.

== Cast ==
- Vanessa Furst as Kizzy
- Anne Ridler as Olivia Brooke
- Melissa Docker as Prue Cuthbert
- John Welsh as Admiral Twiss
- Patrick McAlinney as Peters
- Lisa Welsford as Elizabeth Oliver
- Toby Bridge as Clem Oliver
- Isobel Gordon as Mary Jo
- Angela Browne as Edna Cuthbert
- Meg Ritchie as Mildred Blount
- Paddy Ward as Nat
- Ben Howard as Lumas Doe
- Michael Wardle as Mr. Blount
- Betty Hardy as Gran
- Miriam Margolyes as Mrs. Doe
- Ernest C. Jennings as Uncle Jess
- John Udall as Boyo
- Norah Blaney as Emma Smith
- Francis Sargent as Albert
- Seymour Green as Chairman
- Stella Kemball as Magistrate
- Mary Sheen as Shop Assistant
- Gail MacFarlane as Shop Assistant

== Adaptations ==
The story has also been adapted as a BBC radio drama The Diddakoi. This adaptation features Nisa Cole.
