= Black Narcissus =

1947 British psychological drama film by Michael Powell and Emeric Pressburger

- Theatrical poster
- Directed by: Michael Powell; Emeric Pressburger
- Screenplay by: Michael Powell; Emeric Pressburger
- Based on: Black Narcissus; 1939 novel by Rumer Godden
- Produced by: Michael Powell; Emeric Pressburger
- Starring: Deborah Kerr; Sabu; David Farrar; Flora Robson; Esmond Knight; Jean Simmons; Kathleen Byron
- Cinematography: Jack Cardiff
- Edited by: Reginald Mills
- Music by: Brian Easdale
- Color process: Technicolor
- Production company: The Archers
- Distributed by: General Film Distributors
- Release dates: 24 April 1947 (London); 13 August 1947 (US)
- Running time: 100 minutes
- Country: United Kingdom
- Language: English
- Budget: £280,000 (or $1.2 million)

Black Narcissus is a 1947 British psychological drama film written, directed, and produced jointly by Michael Powell and Emeric Pressburger, based on the 1939 novel Black Narcissus by Rumer Godden. It stars Deborah Kerr, Sabu, David Farrar, and Flora Robson, and features Esmond Knight, Jean Simmons, and Kathleen Byron.

Set during the final years of British colonial rule in India, the film depicts the growing tensions within a small convent of Anglican nuns who have been invited to establish a school and hospital in the old harem of an Indian Raja at the top of an isolated mountain in the Himalayas. The nuns have trouble adapting to the harsh climate and antagonistic population. They come to rely on the help and advice of the Raja's British agent, a cynical Englishman whose attractiveness and panache become a source of temptation for the sisters.

Black Narcissus received acclaim for its technical mastery, with the cinematographer Jack Cardiff winning an Academy Award for Best Cinematography and a Golden Globe Award for Best Cinematography, and Alfred Junge winning an Academy Award for Best Art Direction.

According to film critic David Thomson, "Black Narcissus is that rare thing, an erotic English film about the fantasies of nuns, startling whenever Kathleen Byron is involved".

== Plot ==
Convent of the Order of the Servants of Mary • Calcutta: General Toda Rai, the Rajput ruler of a princely state in the Himalayas, invites an order of Anglican nuns to establish a school and hospital at Mopu, a former harem situated on a high cliff. The ambitious Sister Clodagh is appointed Sister Superior and is sent to Mopu with four other nuns: Sister Philippa for gardening; Sister Briony for the infirmary; Sister Blanche, better known as "Sister Honey", to teach lace-making; and the emotionally unstable Sister Ruth to teach English and maths. All five women are in an unfamiliar, colonial setting.

Mr. Dean, the general's British agent, is deeply sceptical of the project, citing a variety of social and environmental difficulties. He predicts the nuns will leave as soon as the monsoon season begins. It is critical for Clodagh to manage the nuns' well-being, since the Congregation allows every nun to resign at the end of the year.

The sisters struggle to adapt to the local population. The native caretaker, Angu Ayah, dislikes sharing the palace with the nuns. The general's wealthy uncle, now a Hindu holy man, spends all his time meditating on a mountain within the monastery grounds in complete silence. The sisters agree to mentor Kanchi, a local girl with a reputation for erratic behaviour, but Ayah whips her for stealing.

Each convent member starts to experience ill-health and/or emotional problems caused by their surroundings. Clodagh recalls a failed romance which prompted her to leave her home in Ireland and join the order. Ruth grows jealous of Clodagh. Philippa loses herself in the environment and plants the vegetable garden with flowers. Honey's attachment to the local children ends disastrously after she gives ineffective medication to a fatally ill baby. The nuns' failure to save the child's life angers the locals, who abandon the mission. Mr. Dean encourages Clodagh to leave, but she insists on staying.

The sisters also struggle with their vows of chastity. They are constantly tempted by the old harem's erotic wall paintings. In addition, although the sisters planned to educate only girls, they feel compelled to make an exception for the general's boy heir, who needs tutoring in Western culture. He soon falls in love with Kanchi. Ruth grows obsessed with the carnally handsome Mr. Dean and orders an alluring, modern dress to charm him one day. Although Clodagh is irked by Mr. Dean's nonchalance and irreverence, she also finds herself increasingly attracted to him. Philippa requests a transfer to a new convent, complaining that to survive in the colonies, "either you must live like Mr. Dean or like the holy man. Either ignore it or give yourself up to it."

Ruth resigns and announces her intent to go back to Britain. Clodagh visits Ruth to convince her to stay, as the convent is extremely shorthanded. Ruth, who has already changed out of her nun's habit into her new dress, defiantly puts on lipstick in front of Clodagh to signal her personal liberation. She escapes the convent and visits Mr. Dean's house to declare her love, but he rebuffs her advances. Heartbroken, Ruth suffers a mental breakdown and returns to the mission, intent on killing Clodagh. When Clodagh rings the morning service bell, Ruth attempts to push her over the cliff edge. In the ensuing struggle, Ruth falls to her death.

Ruth's death is the last straw for the Congregation, which closes the mission. The remaining nuns leave just as the monsoon season begins, even earlier than Mr. Dean had originally predicted. Mr. Dean meets the caravan to say goodbye, when Clodagh gives him one final request which he accepts: to tend to Ruth's grave. Clodagh and Mr. Dean clasp hands and share a meaningful look, then Clodagh gathers herself and continues on her way.

== Cast ==
- Deborah Kerr as Sister Clodagh
- Sabu as The Young General (Dilip Rai)
- David Farrar as Mr. Dean
- Flora Robson as Sister Philippa
- Esmond Knight as The Old General
- Jean Simmons as Kanchi
- Kathleen Byron as Sister Ruth
- Jenny Laird as Sister Honey
- Judith Furse as Sister Briony
- May Hallatt as Angu Ayah
- Eddie Whaley Jr. as Joseph Anthony
- Shaun Noble as Con
- Nancy Roberts as Mother Dorothea
- Ley On as Phuba

== Production ==
=== Development ===
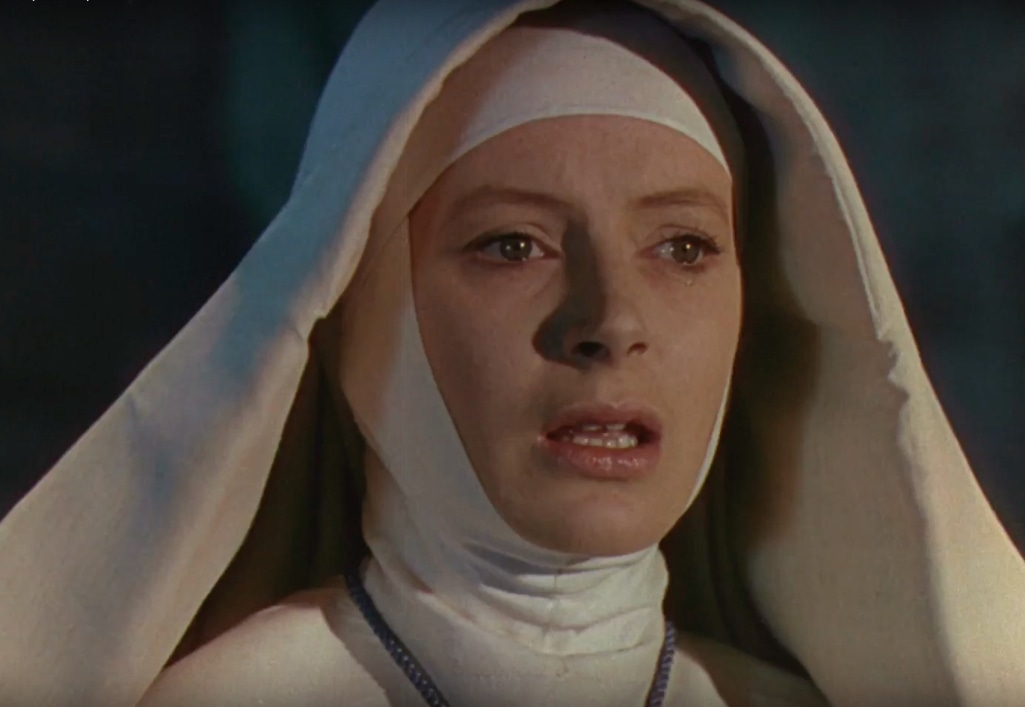
Deborah Kerr as Sister Clodagh

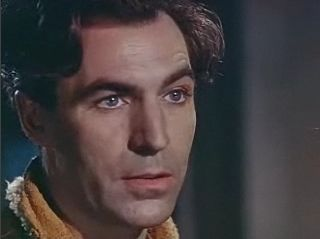
David Farrar as Mr Dean

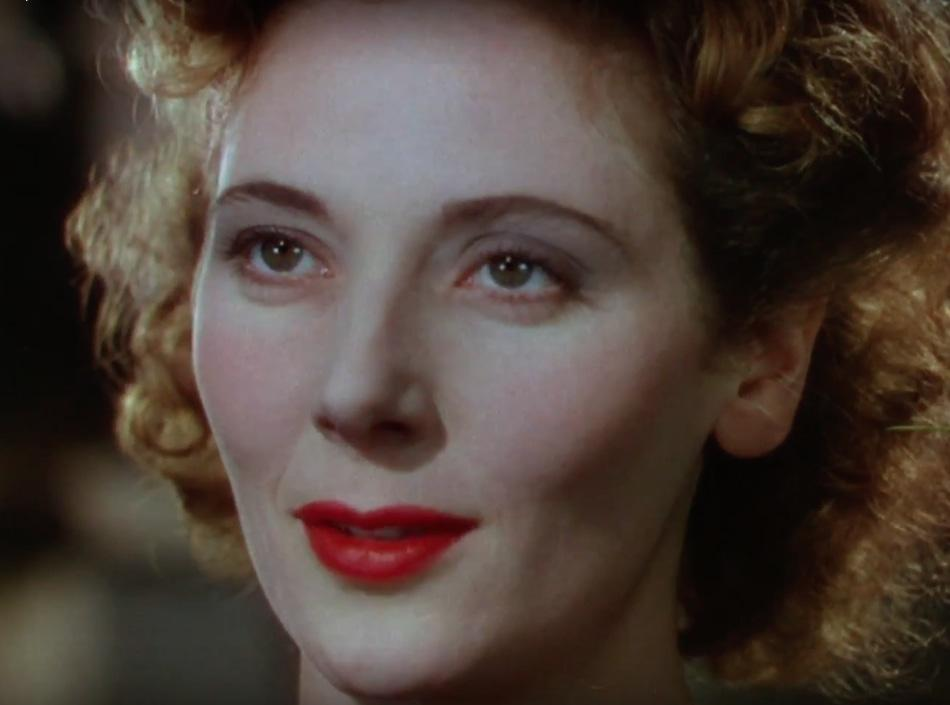
Kathleen Byron as Sister Ruth

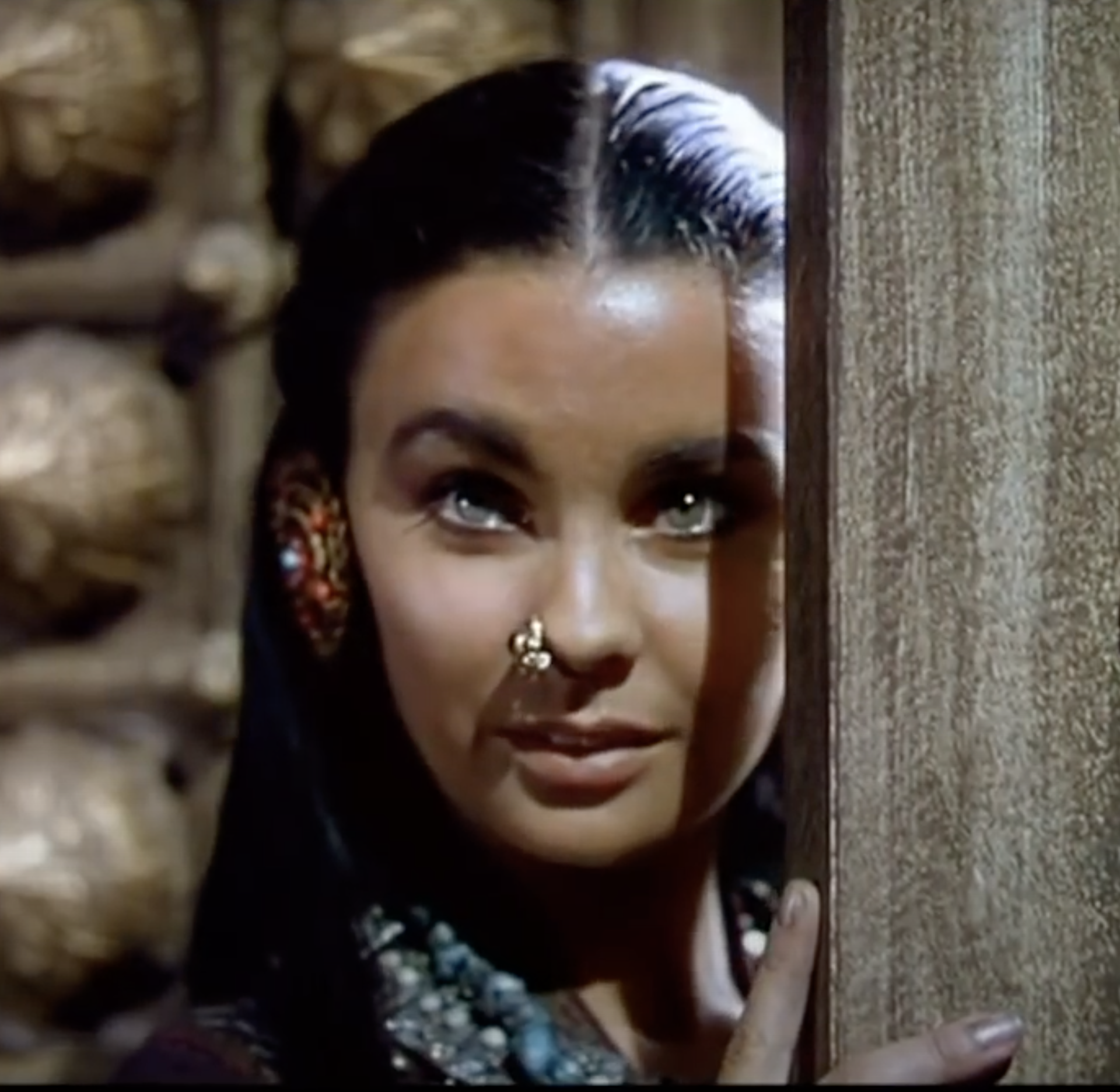
Jean Simmons as Kanchi

Black Narcissus was adapted from Rumer Godden's 1939 novel Black Narcissus. Michael Powell was introduced to the novel by actress Mary Morris, who had appeared in The Thief of Bagdad (1940) and an earlier film where Powell had collaborated with Pressburger, The Spy in Black (1939). Godden had adapted her novel for a stage production for Lee Strasberg in the United States, but allowed Pressburger to write his own screenplay adaptation with Powell.

=== Casting ===
Kathleen Byron was among the first to be cast in the film, in the role of the unstable Sister Ruth. Pressburger described Byron as having a "dreamy voice and great eyes like a lynx", which he felt appropriate for the mentally disturbed character. Deborah Kerr was cast in the role of the leading Sister Superior, Sister Clodagh. Pressburger chose Kerr for the role despite the reservations of Powell, who felt she was too young for the part. At one point, Powell considered Greta Garbo for the part. Kerr was paid £16,000 for fifty-five days of work.

David Farrar was cast as Mr Dean, the virile British agent who becomes the object of Sister Ruth's obsession. Farrar was paid £4,500 for forty-five days of shooting. Flora Robson appears as Sister Philippa, a gardener in the convent.

Of the three principal Indian roles, only the Young General was played by an ethnic Indian, Sabu; the roles of Kanchi, played by Jean Simmons, and the Old General, played by Esmond Knight, were performed by white actors in make-up. Kanchi, 17, is described by Godden as "a basket of fruit, piled high and luscious and ready to eat. Though she looks shyly down, there is something steady and unabashed about her; the fruit is there to be eaten, she does not mean it to rot." Godden approved of Simmons's casting, remarking that she "perfectly fulfilled my description". The Indian extras were cast from workers at Surrey Commercial Docks in Rotherhithe.

=== Filming ===
Before-and-after stills: the top shows the scene as shot, the bottom incorporates W. Percy Day's matte painting, creating the illusion of a deep cliff

Filming of Black Narcissus began on 16 May 1946, and was completed on 22 August. The film was shot primarily at Pinewood Studios but some scenes were shot in Leonardslee Gardens, West Sussex, the home of an Indian army retiree, which had appropriate trees and plants for the Indian setting. While Powell at the time had been known for his love of location shooting, with Black Narcissus he became fascinated with the idea of filming in the studio as much as possible.

The film is known for making extensive use of matte paintings and large-scale landscape paintings (credited to W. Percy Day) to suggest the mountainous environment of the Himalayas, as well as some scale models for motion shots of the convent.

According to Robert Horton, Powell set the climactic sequence, a murder attempt on the cliffs of the cloister, to a pre-existing musical track, staging it as though it were a piece of visual choreography. There was some personal, behind-the-scenes tension, as Kerr was the director's ex-lover and Byron his current one. "It was a situation not uncommon in show business, I was told," Powell later wrote, "but it was new to me."

The film was intended to end with an additional scene in which Sister Clodagh sobs and blames herself for the convent's failure to Mother Dorothea. Mother Dorothea touches and speaks to Sister Clodagh welcomingly as the latter's tears continue to fall. When they filmed the scene with the rainfall on the leaves in what was to have been the penultimate scene, Powell was so impressed with it that he decided to designate that as the last scene and to scrap the Mother Dorothea closing scene. It was filmed but it is not known whether it was printed.

== Release ==
=== Box office ===
Black Narcissus had its world premiere at the Odeon Leicester Square in London on 24 April 1947 attended by Queen Mary, before opening to the public there the following day and being shown in 20 key cities in the UK within 10 days. According to trade papers, the film was a "notable box office attraction" at British cinemas in 1947.

It premiered in the United States on 13 August 1947 in New York City at the Fulton Theatre.

In France, where it was released in 1949, the film sold 1,388,416 tickets. In Japan, it was the fifth top-grossing film of 1950, earning ¥60 million in theatrical rentals.

=== Legion of Decency condemnation ===
In the United States, the Catholic National Legion of Decency condemned the film as "an affront to religion and religious life" for characterising it as "an escape for the abnormal, the neurotic and the frustrated". The version of the film originally shown in the United States had scenes depicting flashbacks of Sister Clodagh's life before becoming a sister edited out at the behest of the Legion of Decency. The 10 cuts to the film, of about 900 feet of film, were supervised by Pressburger, who commented that the cuts were "reasonable, fair and just", and that he made them to further the film's distribution, as the only bookings it had while on the "condemned" list were in New York, Los Angeles and San Francisco. After the cuts were made, the Legion of Decency removed the film from the list, and further bookings were possible.

=== Critical response ===
The Manchester Guardian described the film as possessing "good acting and skilfully built-up atmosphere" and praised the cinematography. Philip Scheuer of the Los Angeles Times gave the film high praise, deeming it an "exquisite cinematic jewel", continuing: "I can't say how authentic Black Narcissus is, but the lotus land to which it carries us is uniquely unforgettable." Jane Corby of the Brooklyn Daily Eagle described the film as a "peculiar recital of religious life" and praised the cinematography, but felt that the "mixed atmosphere of religious seclusion and romantic vagaries is very confusing".

Thomas M. Pryor of The New York Times lauded the creative collaboration of Michael Powell and Emeric Pressburger, the writer-director duo, for their notable artistic achievement in Black Narcissus. Pryor particularly highlighted the groundbreaking use of Technicolor in the movie, noting its exceptional realism and its ability to create a riveting dramatic impact. He further commended the film's adept employment of miniature sets and process shots to authentically evoke the ambience of the Himalayan setting. Pryor found the presentation of the film's dramatic elements to be exceptionally well-executed and praised the overall performance of the cast as commendable. Nevertheless, Pryor observed a subtle undercurrent of detachment and cynicism in the portrayal of the nuns within the narrative, acknowledging that this aspect might prove disconcerting to certain viewers.

Writing in The Nation in 1947, critic James Agee stated, "It is all intended to be very "psychological," "atmospheric," "rueful," and "worldly wise." ... Michael Powell and Emeric Pressburger were badly mistaken in trying to make a movie at all. There is some unusually good color photography, and as movie-making some of it is intelligent and powerful. But the pervasive attitude in and toward the picture makes it as a whole tedious and vulgar."

On the review aggregator website Rotten Tomatoes, the film has an approval rating of 100% based on 36 reviews, with an average rating of 9.1/10. On Metacritic, the film has a score of 86 based on 15 reviews, indicating "universal acclaim". Reviewing the film in 2005, Peter Bradshaw of The Guardian gave it five out of five stars, praising its direction, performances, and production design, and calling it "an all-time top 10 favourite of mine". In another retrospective review, Tim Dirks of Filmsite called the film "provocative, dazzling and rich-colored".

==== Awards and honours ====
Institution	Category	Recipient	Result	Ref.
Academy Awards	Best Color Cinematography	Jack Cardiff	Won	
Academy Awards	Best Color Art Direction	Alfred Junge	Won	
Golden Globe Awards	Best Cinematography	Jack Cardiff	Won	
New York Film Critics Circle	Best Actress	Deborah Kerr	Won	
New York Film Critics Circle	Best Actress	Kathleen Byron	Nominated	

=== Home media ===
The Criterion Collection, an American home media distribution company, released Black Narcissus on LaserDisc in the early 1990s, and issued it on DVD in 2002. A commentary track by Powell with Martin Scorsese is included, the first time a director has participated in a commentary.

In 2008, ITV, the corporate heir to the Rank Organisation's General Film Distributors, released a restored version of the film on Blu-ray in the United Kingdom. The Criterion Collection subsequently issued the restored version on DVD and Blu-ray on 20 July 2010. Network Distributing, under licence from ITV, released another Blu-ray edition in the United Kingdom in 2014.

== Historical relevance ==
Black Narcissus was released only a few months before India achieved independence from Britain in August 1947. Film critic Dave Kehr has suggested that the final images of the film, as the sisters abandon the Himalayas and proceed down the mountain, could have been interpreted by British viewers in 1947 as "a last farewell to their fading empire"; he suggests that for the film-makers, it is not an image of defeat "but of a respectful, rational retreat from something that England never owned nor understood". The story in the film quite closely follows that of the book, which was published in 1939.

== Legacy ==
Black Narcissus achieved acclaim for its pioneering technical mastery and shocked audiences at the time of release with its vibrant colour and the themes of the film. Audiences gasped at some of the scenes, notably the shot of the pink flowers which, shown on the big screen, was a spectacle at the time. The film's lighting and techniques have had a profound impact on later film makers, notably Martin Scorsese who used the extreme close-ups of the sisters as the inspiration for the treatment of Tom Cruise's character around the pool table in The Color of Money. Scorsese has said that the film, particularly in its last quarter, is one of the earliest erotic films. The film was one of his favourites as a boy and one of the greatest experiences he has had with film is viewing Black Narcissus projected on a massive screen at the Directors Guild in 1983. In Michael Powell's own view, this was the most erotic film he ever made. "It is all done by suggestion, but eroticism is in every frame and image from beginning to end. It is a film full of wonderful performances and passion just below the surface, which finally, at the end of the film, erupts." The English film critic Peter Bradshaw, who put it on his list of the ten best films ever made, took Powell's statement further, and said that it was the most erotic film he had ever seen.

In The Great British Picture Show, the writer George Perry stated, "[Powell and Pressburger's] films looked better than they were – the location photography in Technicolor by Jack Cardiff in Black Narcissus was a great deal better than the story and lifted the film above the threatening banality." In contrast, the critic Ian Christie wrote in the Radio Times in the 1980s that "unusually for a British film from the emotionally frozen forties the melodrama works so well it almost seems as if Powell and Pressburger survived the slings and barbs of contemporary criticism to find their ideal audience in the 1980s". Marina Warner, introducing the film on BBC2 (on a nun-themed film evening, with Thérèse), called it a masterpiece.

The film's resonance with populations exploring previously stifled sexual desires and expression extends beyond its contemporary milieu of women in the post-war era. Black Narcissus also influenced the themes and aesthetic of the ground-breaking gay experimental film Pink Narcissus, which portrays a series of pornographic vignettes in vivid colour as the fantasies of a prostitute between visits from his keeper. Although Pink Narcissus was lost in obscurity for some time, in recent years it has resurfaced as a cult classic, due in part to the vivid, fantastical aesthetic inspired by Black Narcissus.

The look and cinematography of the 2013 Disney film Frozen was influenced by Black Narcissus. While working on the look and nature of the film's cinematography, Frozen art director Michael Giaimo was greatly influenced by Jack Cardiff's work in Black Narcissus.

Lucile Hadžihalilović cited Black Narcissus as one of the films that inspired her 2025 fantasy drama film The Ice Tower, with the tension between the two women on the precipice and "the madness that can possess a woman in an icy mountain landscape."

== See also ==
- BFI Top 100 British films
- Black Narcissus (TV series), a 2020 British series based on the same book
- Time Out 100 best British films
