= Norman Geras =

British political theorist (1943–2013)

Norman Geras (/ˈɡɛrəs/ GHERR-əs; 25 August 1943 – 18 October 2013) was a political theorist and Professor Emeritus of Politics at the University of Manchester. He contributed to an analysis of the works of Karl Marx in his book Marx and Human Nature and the article "The Controversy About Marx and Justice". His "Seven Types of Obloquy: Travesties of Marxism", appeared in the Socialist Register in 1990.

== Biography ==
Geras was born in Bulawayo, Southern Rhodesia, to a Jewish family. Arriving in the UK in 1962, he read philosophy, politics and economics at Pembroke College, Oxford, and graduated in 1965. He was a research student from 1965 to 1967 at Nuffield College, Oxford, before joining the University of Manchester as a lecturer in 1967.

He married the children's writer Adèle Geras (born Jerusalem, 1944) in 1967. One of their two daughters is Sophie Hannah, the poet and author.

Connected with the Trotskyist International Marxist Group at the time of writing his study of Rosa Luxemburg's political thought, The Times obituarist wrote of Geras' aim for the book: "He set out to defend (as he would then have seen it) Luxemburg’s Marxist orthodoxy. It may seem perverse to Geras’s later admirers across the political divide that he would then have regarded this as a point in Luxemburg’s favour, but the quality of his scholarship was undeniable. He showed that Luxemburg had largely shared Lenin’s own pre-1917 analysis of the revolutionaries’ task."

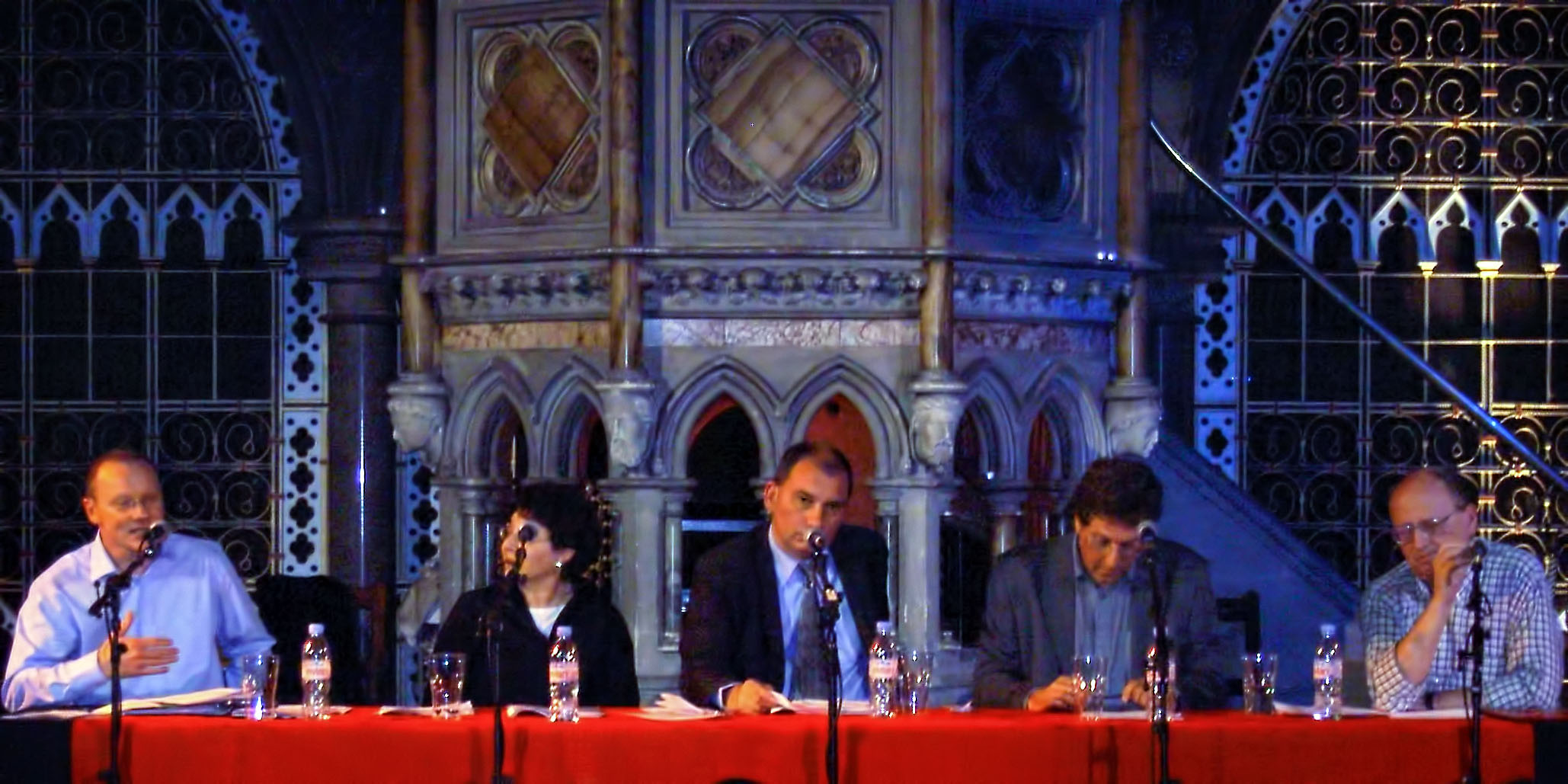
The panel at the public launch of the Euston Manifesto. From left to right: Alan Johnson, Eve Garrard, Nick Cohen, Shalom Lappin, and Norman Geras.

Geras was on the editorial board of New Left Review from 1976 to 1992, and then on the editorial board of Socialist Register from 1995 to 2003. After retiring as a Professor in 2003, he wrote a blog, which focused on political issues, such as the 2003 invasion of Iraq, which he supported, his academic interests, and a range of other topics, including popular music, cricket and films. In 2006, he was one of the principal authors of the Euston Manifesto.

Geras's 1989 essay "Our Morals: The Ethics of Revolution" was on the University of Reading's list of essential reading for the Justice and Injustice politics module in 2017, but the university warned students to read the essay only in a secure setting where it could not be seen by "those who are not prepared to view it", and not to read it on personal devices. This was after the essay was identified by the university as "sensitive" under the "Prevent" counter-terrorism programme. Geras rejected terrorism, but argued that violence could be justified in the case of grave social injustices.

== Bibliography ==
- 1976: The Legacy of Rosa Luxemburg ISBN 0-902308-28-9 (1983 paperback: ISBN 0-86091-780-0)
- 1983: Marx and Human Nature: Refutation of a Legend ISBN 0-86091-767-3
- 1986: Literature of Revolution: Essays on Marxism ISBN 0-86091-859-9
- 1990: Discourses of Extremity ISBN 0-86091-980-3
- 1995: Solidarity in the Conversation of Humankind: Ungroundable Liberalism of Richard Rorty ISBN 0-86091-453-4
- 1997: The Ashes '97: The View from the Boundary (with Ian Holliday and Tom Jenkins, Illustrator) ISBN 1-897626-11-8
- 1998: The Contract of Mutual Indifference: Political Philosophy After the Holocaust ISBN 1-85984-868-0 (1999 paperback: ISBN 1-85984-229-1)
- 2000: Enlightenment and Modernity (edited by Geras and Robert Wokler) ISBN 0-312-22385-4
- 2002: Men of Waugh: Ashes 2001 ISBN 0-9541985-0-6
- 2005: "On the London Bombings". Telos 132 (Fall 2005). New York: Telos Press
- 2011: Crimes against humanity: Birth of a concept ISBN 978-0-7190-8241-2
- 2019: The Norman Geras Reader: What’s There Is There (Manchester University Press). co-editors: Eve Garrard and Ben Cohen.
