= Black Narcissus (TV series) =

British drama series

- Promotional poster
- Genre: Drama
- Based on: Black Narcissus by Rumer Godden
- Written by: Amanda Coe
- Directed by: Charlotte Bruus Christensen
- Starring: Gemma Arterton; Alessandro Nivola; Aisling Franciosi; Diana Rigg; Jim Broadbent; Gina McKee
- Countries of origin: United Kingdom; United States
- Original language: English
- No. of episodes: 3

Production
- Executive producers: Amanda Coe; Andrew Macdonald; Allon Reich; Lucy Richer
- Editor: Jinx Godfrey
- Running time: 57–60 minutes
- Production companies: DNA TV; FXP

Original release
- Network: FX
- Release: November 23, 2020
- Network: BBC One
- Release: December 27, 2020

Black Narcissus is an American-British three-part television drama based on the 1939 novel of the same name by Rumer Godden. The series features one of the final performances of Diana Rigg, who died in September 2020. The drama premiered on November 23, 2020, on FX in the US, and on December 27, 2020, on BBC One in the UK.

== Premise ==
An Anglican nun sent to establish a branch of her order with her fellow sisters in the Himalayas struggles to temper her attractions to a World War I veteran.

== Cast ==
- Gemma Arterton as Sister Clodagh
- Alessandro Nivola as Mr. Dean
- Aisling Franciosi as Sister Ruth
- Diana Rigg as Mother Dorothea
- Jim Broadbent as Father Roberts
- Gina McKee as Sister Adela
- Rosie Cavaliero as Sister Briony
- Patsy Ferran as Sister Blanche
- Karen Bryson as Sister Philippa
- Nila Aalia as Angu Ayah
- Charlie Maher as Con
- Dipika Kunwar as Kanchi
- Chaneil Kular as Dilip Rai
- Gianni Gonsalves as Princess Srimati
- Soumil Malla as Joseph Anthony
- Myat Min Khant as Villager
- Kulvinder Ghir as General Toda Rai

== Episodes ==
No.	Title	Directed by	Written by	Original release date	U.S. viewers (millions)
1	"Episode One"	Charlotte Bruus Christensen	Amanda Coe	November 23, 2020	0.445
In 1914, Princess Srimati commits suicide by jumping off the bell tower at the remote Palace of Mopu in the Himalayas. In 1934, Sister Clodagh leads several hand picked British nuns from her order in Darjeeling to the Palace of Mopu in order to set up a mission school. While establishing the mission, Sister Clodagh works with the housekeeper Angu Ayah and the General's agent Mr. Dean, whose religious skepticism clashes with her Christian faith. Tensions emerge when Sister Ruth resents being reassigned from stitching to teaching the children. Ruth also discovers the late Srimati's former chambers and is haunted by her ghostly presence. Against Dean's advice, the nuns tend to the injuries of a local villager, who was wounded by a knife.
2	"Episode Two"	Charlotte Bruus Christensen	Amanda Coe	November 23, 2020	0.333
Despite her misgivings, Sister Clodagh enrols General Toda Rai's adolescent son Dilip Rai as a student at the school. Rai develops a romantic relationship with a female Dalit student named Kanchi. Following a disagreement about growing flowers in winter, Sister Philippa departs the mission school. The nuns also give cod liver oil to the dying infant child of a local villager. Feelings come to a head between Sister Clodagh, Sister Ruth and Mr Dean at the Christmas celebration. Sister Ruth has feelings for Mr Dean and becomes jealous of Sister Clodagh, who intends to send her back to Darjeeling.
3	"Episode Three"	Charlotte Bruus Christensen	Amanda Coe	November 23, 2020	0.310
After rescuing Father Roberts from a snowstorm, Sister Ruth manages to curry the priest's favour. Sister Clodagh's attempts to regain control of the situation by imposing strict order, causing Sister Adela to question her leadership. After learning that Dilip Rai is fraternising with Kanchi, General Rai demands her expulsion. At the sisters' petition, he settles for Kanchi to be beaten with a rod. After the infant child that the nuns gave cod liver oil to dies, the villagers come to distrust the nuns and abandon the mission school. With tensions reaching a climax, Ruth renounces her oath and flees the mission school. After Dean rebuffs her, Ruth attacks Clodagh at the bell tower but falls to her death. The nuns abandon the mission. Following Ruth's burial, Clodagh reveals her true name to Dean, whom she has feelings for.

== Production ==
In October 2019, filming began on a new three part drama loosely based on the 1939 Rumer Godden novel, which was also adapted into the film Black Narcissus (1947), featuring Deborah Kerr as Sister Clodagh.

The drama is a co-production between the BBC and FX. Alessandro Nivola and Gemma Arterton star in the series, with Amanda Coe writing the screenplay and Charlotte Bruus Christensen directing all three episodes. Filming took place in Jomsom, Nepal, and at Pinewood Studios. The drama premiered on November 23, 2020, on FX.

== Release ==
The series premiered on November 23, 2020, on FX in the United States, and on December 27, 2020, on BBC One in the United Kingdom. In selected international territories, the series was released on Disney+ under the dedicated streaming hub Star as an original series, on March 5, 2021. In New Zealand, the series is distributed by Sky's streaming platform Neon.

== Reception ==
=== Critical response ===
The review aggregator Rotten Tomatoes reported an approval rating of 53% based on 29 critic reviews, with an average rating of 5.69/10. The critics consensus reads "Black Narcissus doesn't quite escape the shadow of its cinematic forebear, but this miniseries sufficiently keeps the faith with excellent performances and visual splendor." Metacritic gave the miniseries a weighted average score of 66 out of 100 based on 16 critic reviews, indicating "generally favorable reviews".

The series was reviewed for The Guardian by Lucy Mangan who gave it three stars and called it "erotic, gothic – and totally unconvincing" and Anita Singh for The Telegraph gave it four stars reporting the first episode as "the hills are alive with the sound of sexually-charged nuns".

== See also ==
- Black Narcissus (1947 film)
