= Rumer Godden =

British author (1907–1998)

Rumer Godden OBE
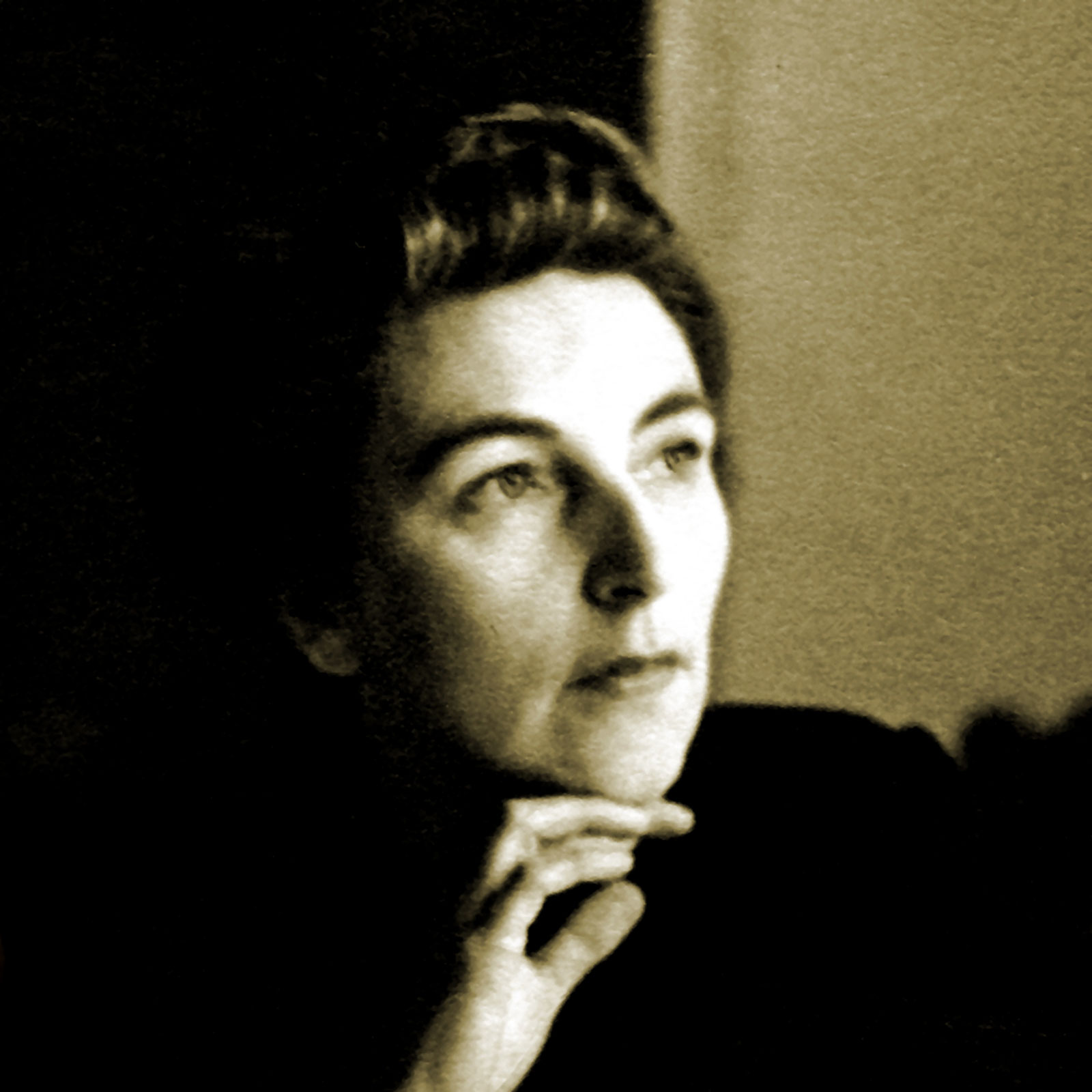
- Rumer Godden, 1940s
- Born: Margaret Rumer Godden; 10 December 1907; Eastbourne, Sussex, England
- Died: 8 November 1998 (aged 90); Moniaive, Dumfries and Galloway, Scotland
- Occupations: Novelist, poet and children's story writer
- Spouses: Laurence Sinclair Foster (1934–1948); James Haynes Dixon (1949–1973, his death)
- Children: 2
- Writing career
- Notable works: Black Narcissus, The River, The Greengage Summer, The Doll's House
- Notable awards: Whitbread Award for Children's Literature (1972)

Margaret Rumer Godden OBE (10 December 1907 – 8 November 1998) was a British author of more than 60 fiction and non-fiction books. Nine of her works have been made into films, most notably Black Narcissus in 1947 and The River in 1951.

A few of her works were co-written with her elder sister, novelist Jon Godden, including Two Under the Indian Sun, a memoir of the Goddens' childhood in a region of India now part of Bangladesh.

== Early life ==
Cover of Black Narcissus (1939), published by Little, Brown & Co.

Godden was born in Eastbourne, Sussex, England. She grew up with her three sisters in Narayanganj, colonial India (later Bangladesh), where her father, a shipping company executive, worked for the Brahmaputra Steam Navigation Company. Her parents sent the girls to England for schooling, as was the custom of the time, but brought them back to Narayanganj when the First World War began.

Godden returned to the United Kingdom with her sisters to continue her interrupted schooling in 1920, spending time at Moira House School in Eastbourne and eventually training as a dance teacher. She went back to Calcutta in 1925 and opened a dance school for English and Indian children. Godden ran the school for 20 years with the help of her sister Nancy. During this time she published her first best-seller, the 1939 novel Black Narcissus.

== Writing career ==
The Greengage Summer (1958), 1962 Pan paperback edition

In 1942, after eight years in an unhappy marriage (one she entered into in 1934 because she was pregnant), she moved with her two daughters, Jane and Paula, (her husband Laurence Foster having joined the army) to Kashmir, living first on a houseboat and then in a rented house where she started a farm. The novel Kingfishers Catch Fire was based on her time in Kashmir. After a mysterious incident, that appeared to be an attempt to poison both her and her daughters, she returned to Calcutta in 1944. She returned to the United Kingdom in 1945 to concentrate on her writing, frequently moving house but living mostly in Sussex and London. She was divorced in 1948. After returning from America to oversee the script for the movie of her book The River, Godden married civil servant James Haynes Dixon on 26 November 1949.

In the early 1950s Godden became interested in the Catholic Church, though she did not officially convert until 1968, and several of her later novels contain sympathetic portrayals of Catholic priests and nuns. In addition to Black Narcissus, two of her books deal with the subject of women in religious communities. In Five for Sorrow, Ten for Joy and In This House of Brede she examined the balance between the mystical, spiritual aspects of religion and the practical, human realities of religious life.

A number of Godden's novels are set in India. She won a 1972 Whitbread award for The Diddakoi, a young adult novel about Gypsies, televised by the BBC as Kizzy.

== Later life and death ==
In 1968 she took the tenancy of Lamb House in Rye, East Sussex, where she lived until the death of her husband in 1973. She moved to Moniaive in Dumfriesshire in 1978, when she was 70, to be near her daughter Jane. She was appointed an Officer of the Order of the British Empire (OBE) in 1993. She visited India once more, in 1994, returning to Kashmir for the filming of a BBC Bookmark documentary about her life and books.

Rumer Godden died on 8 November 1998 at the age of 90 after a series of strokes; her ashes were buried with those of her second husband in Rye.

== Works ==
=== Books for adults ===
==== Fiction ====
- 1936 Chinese Puzzle, her first published book-length work
- 1937 The Lady and the Unicorn
- 1939 Black Narcissus, filmed in 1947; radio adaptation in 2008, BBC mini-series aired 2020.
- 1940 Gypsy, Gypsy
- 1942 Breakfast with the Nikolides
- 1945 A Fugue in Time, published in the US as Take Three Tenses, made into the film Enchantment in 1948 starring David Niven and Teresa Wright
- 1946 The River, made into a film in 1951 directed by Jean Renoir; she collaborated on the screenplay for the film.
- 1947 A Candle for St. Jude
- 1950 A Breath of Air
- 1953 Kingfishers Catch Fire
- 1956 An Episode of Sparrows, made into the film Innocent Sinners in 1958
- 1957 Mooltiki, and Other Stories and Poems of India
- 1958 The Greengage Summer, made into a film in 1961
- 1961 China Court: The Hours of a Country House
- 1963 The Battle of the Villa Fiorita, filmed in 1965
- 1968 Gone: A Thread of Stories (written with Jon Godden)
- 1968 Swans and Turtles (short stories)
- 1969 In This House of Brede, made into a 1975 television film starring Diana Rigg
- 1975 The Peacock Spring, adapted for television in 1995
- 1979 Five For Sorrow, Ten For Joy
- 1981 The Dark Horse
- 1984 Thursday's Children (Viking, New York)
- 1989 Indian Dust (written with Jon Godden)
- 1990 Mercy, Pity, Peace, and Love: Stories (written with Jon Godden)
- 1991 Coromandel Sea Change
- 1994 Pippa Passes
- 1997 Cromartie vs. the God Shiva, her last novel

==== Non-fiction ====
- 1943 Rungli-Rungliot – republished in 1961 as Thus Far and No Further
- 1945 Bengal Journey: A Story of the Part Played by Women in the Province, 1939–1945
- 1955 Hans Christian Andersen (biography)
- 1966 Two Under the Indian Sun (childhood memories – written with Jon Godden)
- 1968 Mrs. Manders' Cook Book
- 1971 The Tale of the Tales: Beatrix Potter Ballet
- 1972 Shiva's Pigeons (written with Jon Godden)
- 1977 The Butterfly Lions
- 1980 Gulbadan: Portrait of a Rose Princess at the Mughal Court
- 1987 A Time to Dance, No Time to Weep, an autobiography
- 1989 A House with Four Rooms, an autobiography

=== Children's books ===
- 1947 The Doll's House, made into an animated series: Tottie: The Story of a Doll's House
- 1951 The Mousewife
- 1952 Mouse House
- 1954 Impunity Jane: The Story of a Pocket Doll
- 1956 The Fairy Doll
- 1958 The Story of Holly and Ivy
- 1960 Candy Floss
- 1961 Saint Jerome and the Lion (retelling of the legend in verse)
- 1961 Miss Happiness and Miss Flower, about Japanese dolls and the house built for them.
- 1963 Little Plum, the sequel to Miss Happiness and Miss Flower
- 1964 Home is the Sailor
- 1967 The Kitchen Madonna: two children make an icon for their Ukrainian housekeeper, a war refugee.
- 1969 Operation Sippacik
- 1972 The Diddakoi (also published as Gypsy Girl), winner of the Whitbread Award. Adapted by the BBC as a radio drama starring Nisa Cole, and for television as Kizzy.
- 1972 The Old Woman Who Lived in a Vinegar Bottle
- 1975 Mr. McFadden's Hallowe'en
- 1977 The Rocking Horse Secret
- 1978 A Kindle of Kittens
- 1981 The Dragon of Og
- 1983 Four Dolls
- 1983 The Valiant Chatti-Maker
- 1984 Mouse Time: Two Stories
- 1990 Fu-Dog
- 1992 Great Grandfather's House
- 1992 Listen to the Nightingale
- 1996 The Little Chair
- 1996 Premlata and the Festival of Lights

=== Poetry ===
- 1949 In Noah's Ark
- 1968 A Letter to the World (based on the works of Emily Dickinson)
- 1996 Cockcrow to Starlight: A Day Full of Poetry (anthology for children)
- 1996 A Pocket Book of Spiritual Poems

=== Translations ===
- 1963 Prayers from the Ark, a translation of a collection of poems by French author Carmen Bernos de Gasztold
- 1967 The Beasts' Choir, a translation of a collection of poems by French author Carmen Bernos de Gasztold - republished in 1970 as The Creatures' Choir.

== See also ==
- Paws and Whiskers – 2014 anthology – includes Godden's story about her dog Piers.
