= Black Narcissus (novel) =

1939 novel by Rumer Godden

- First US edition
- Author: Rumer Godden
- Language: English
- Publisher: Peter Davies (UK); Little, Brown (US)
- Publication date: 1939 (UK)
- Publication place: United Kingdom
- Media type: Print (Hardcover)

Black Narcissus is the third novel by English writer Rumer Godden and was published in 1939. It was adapted into the 1947 film of the same name.

== Plot summary ==
A group of English nuns travel to Mopu (Note: Mopu is a fictional palace in a princely state of the eastern Indian Himalayas.) (near Darjeeling) to create a convent school. They are situated in a palace at the top of an isolated mountain above a valley in the Himalayas. The palace has ancient and erotic artwork on the walls and was once a harem. Although the sisters' intentions are noble, they understand little of the area's people and culture.

Mr. Dean, a local agent, predicts the failure of their mission. Sister Clodagh, the Sister Superior of the group, is ambitious but questions her capabilities. She persists, sometimes clashing with Mr. Dean. Sister Ruth becomes increasingly emotionally unwell.

The sisters often clash with Angu Ayah, the building's caretaker, as well as the local population. A young local girl, Kanchi, becomes involved with "the Young General" who has begun to attend classes at the convent. He wishes to understand Western culture better and improve his English. As each sister begins to suffer emotionally due to her situation, Sister Ruth becomes jealous of Sister Clodagh and obsessed with Mr. Dean.

== Development ==
In her autobiography, A Time to Dance, a Time to Weep, Godden, who grew up in India, describes an event that became an inspiration for Black Narcissus. While exploring the Indian countryside with friends one day, they came across a gravestone, covered with brush. When they cleared it away, all that was on the stone was the name "Sister Ruth".

== Reception ==
A 1939 book review by Kirkus Reviews called the book "Not a book for headline reviews and big sales, but a book whose popularity will spread by word of mouth publicity, a book that discerning readers will make their own. It is a strange and fascinating book." and summarized: "The sort of book that should be read to be sold; definitely a booksellers' find type of book. Don't miss it". Reviewing Godden's India books in 2013 for The Guardian, Rosie Thomas wrote, "For all its convent setting, the novel thrums with sex, portrayed with a subtlety that seems only to intensify its power. The story is simple, but the narrative takes an unshakeable hold, building to a climax involving sexual obsession, insanity and tragic death, which, despite the gothic elements, is handled with masterful restraint."

== Adaptations ==
- Black Narcissus (1947 film) written, produced, and directed by Michael Powell and Emeric Pressburger, and starring Deborah Kerr, Sabu, David Farrar, Flora Robson, Esmond Knight and Jean Simmons.
- Black Narcissus (TV series), a 2020 television adaptation of the novel starring Gemma Arterton as Sister Clodagh, Alessandro Nivola as Mr. Dean, and Aisling Franciosi as Sister Ruth.
- A BBC radio adaptation was also broadcast in 2008.
