= BAFTA Award for Outstanding British Film =

British film industry award

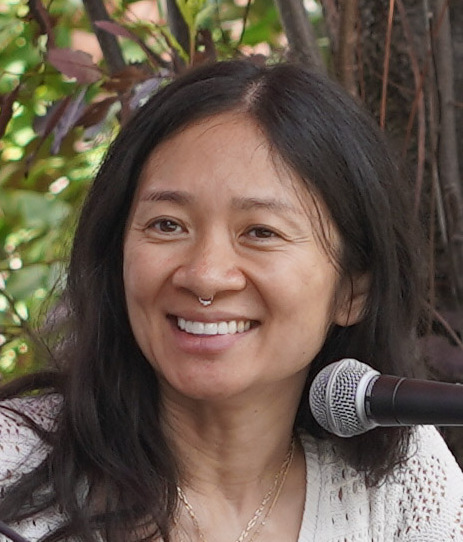
- The 2025 recipient: Chloé Zhao for Hamnet
- Awarded for: Excellence in British cinema
- Location: London
- Country: United Kingdom
- Presented by: British Academy of Film and Television Arts
- First award: 1947
- Currently held by: Hamnet (2025)
- Website: http://www.bafta.org/

The BAFTA Award for Outstanding British Film is a film award given annually by the British Academy of Film and Television Arts and presented at the British Academy Film Awards. The award was first given at the 1st British Academy Film Awards, first recognising the films of 1947, and lasted until the 1968 ceremony. For over two decades a specific category for British cinema did not exist, until it was revived at the 46th British Academy Film Awards, recognising the films of 1992. It was previously known as the Alexander Korda Award for Best British Film; while still given in honour of Korda, the award is now called "Outstanding British Film" and recognises "outstanding and original British filmmaking which shows exceptional creativity and innovation."

To be eligible for nomination as Outstanding British Film, a film "must have significant creative involvement by individuals who are British", including those who have been permanently resident in the UK for ten years or more. The candidates for nomination are the film's directors, writers, and up to three producers; if none of these are British, the film will only be eligible in exceptional circumstances.

In the following lists, the titles and names in bold with a gold background are the winners and recipients respectively; those not in bold are the nominees. The years given are those in which the films under consideration were released, not the year of the ceremony, which always takes place the following year.

== Winners and nominees ==
indicates the winner

=== 1940s ===
Year	Film	Director(s)	Producer(s)
**1947** (1st)	**Odd Man Out**	**Carol Reed**	**Carol Reed**
**1948** (2nd)	**The Fallen Idol**	**Carol Reed**	**Carol Reed**
**1948** (2nd)	Hamlet	Laurence Olivier	Laurence Olivier
**1948** (2nd)	Oliver Twist	David Lean	Ronald Neame
**1948** (2nd)	Once a Jolly Swagman	Jack Lee	Ian Dalrymple
**1948** (2nd)	The Red Shoes	Michael Powell, Emeric Pressburger	Michael Powell, Emeric Pressburger
**1948** (2nd)	Scott of the Antarctic	Charles Frend	Michael Balcon
**1948** (2nd)	The Small Voice	Fergus McDonell	Anthony Havelock-Allan
**1949** (3rd)	**The Third Man**	**Carol Reed**	**Carol Reed**
**1949** (3rd)	Kind Hearts and Coronets	Robert Hamer	Michael Balcon
**1949** (3rd)	Passport to Pimlico	Henry Cornelius	Michael Balcon
**1949** (3rd)	The Queen of Spades	Thorold Dickinson	Anatole de Grunwald
**1949** (3rd)	A Run for Your Money	Charles Frend	Michael Balcon
**1949** (3rd)	The Small Back Room	Michael Powell, Emeric Pressburger	Michael Powell, Emeric Pressburger
**1949** (3rd)	Whisky Galore!	Alexander Mackendrick	Michael Balcon

=== 1950s ===
Year	Film	Director(s)	Producer(s)
**1950** (4th)	**The Blue Lamp**	**Basil Dearden**	**Michael Balcon**
**1950** (4th)	Chance of a Lifetime	Bernard Miles	Bernard Miles
**1950** (4th)	Morning Departure	Roy Ward Baker	Jay Lewis
**1950** (4th)	Seven Days to Noon	John Boulting, Roy Boulting	John Boulting, Roy Boulting
**1950** (4th)	State Secret	Sidney Gilliat	Sidney Gilliat, Frank Launder
**1950** (4th)	The Wooden Horse	Jack Lee	Ian Dalrymple
**1951** (5th)	**The Lavender Hill Mob**	**Charles Crichton**	**Michael Balcon**
**1951** (5th)	The Browning Version	Anthony Asquith	Teddy Baird
**1951** (5th)	The Magic Box	John Boulting	Ronald Neame
**1951** (5th)	The Magic Garden	Donald Swanson	Donald Swanson
**1951** (5th)	The Man in the White Suit	Alexander Mackendrick	Michael Balcon
**1951** (5th)	No Resting Place	Paul Rotha	Colin Lesslie
**1951** (5th)	The Small Miracle	Maurice Cloche, Ralph Smart	Anthony Havelock-Allan
**1951** (5th)	White Corridors	Pat Jackson	John Croydon, Joseph Janni
**1952** (6th)	**The Sound Barrier**	**David Lean**	**David Lean**
**1952** (6th)	Angels One Five	George More O'Ferrall	John W. Gossage, Derek N. Twist
**1952** (6th)	Cry, the Beloved Country	Zoltán Korda	Zoltán Korda, Alan Paton
**1952** (6th)	Mandy	Alexander Mackendrick, Fred F. Sears	Michael Balcon, Leslie Norman
**1952** (6th)	Outcast of the Islands	Carol Reed	Carol Reed
**1952** (6th)	The River	Jean Renoir	Kenneth McEldowney, Jean Renoir
**1953** (7th)	**Genevieve**	**Henry Cornelius**	**Henry Cornelius**
**1953** (7th)	The Cruel Sea	Charles Frend	Leslie Norman
**1953** (7th)	The Heart of the Matter	George More O'Ferrall	Ian Dalrymple
**1953** (7th)	The Kidnappers	Philip Leacock	Sergei Nolbandov, Leslie Parkyn
**1953** (7th)	Moulin Rouge	John Huston	John and James Woolf
**1954** (8th)	**Hobson's Choice**	**David Lean**	**David Lean**
**1954** (8th)	Carrington V.C.	Anthony Asquith	Teddy Baird
**1954** (8th)	The Divided Heart	Charles Crichton	Michael Truman
**1954** (8th)	Doctor in the House	Ralph Thomas	Betty E. Box
**1954** (8th)	For Better, for Worse	J. Lee Thompson	Kenneth Harper
**1954** (8th)	The Maggie	Alexander Mackendrick	Michael Truman
**1954** (8th)	The Purple Plain	Robert Parrish	John Bryan
**1954** (8th)	Romeo and Juliet	Renato Castellani	Sandro Ghenzi, Joseph Janni
**1955** (9th)	**Richard III**	**Laurence Olivier**	**Laurence Olivier**
**1955** (9th)	The Colditz Story	Guy Hamilton	Ivan Foxwell
**1955** (9th)	The Dam Busters	Michael Anderson	Robert Clark, W. A. Whittaker
**1955** (9th)	The Ladykillers	Alexander Mackendrick	Seth Holt, Michael Balcon
**1955** (9th)	The Night My Number Came Up	Leslie Norman	Michael Balcon
**1955** (9th)	The Prisoner	Peter Glenville	Vivian Cox
**1955** (9th)	Simba	Brian Desmond Hurst	Peter De Sarigny
**1956** (10th)	**Reach for the Sky**	**Lewis Gilbert**	**Daniel M. Angel**
**1956** (10th)	The Battle of the River Plate	Michael Powell, Emeric Pressburger	Michael Powell, Emeric Pressburger
**1956** (10th)	The Man Who Never Was	Ronald Neame	André Hakim
**1956** (10th)	A Town Like Alice	Jack Lee	Joseph Janni
**1956** (10th)	Yield to the Night	J. Lee Thompson	Kenneth Harper
**1957** (11th)	**The Bridge on the River Kwai**	**David Lean**	**Sam Spiegel**
**1957** (11th)	The Prince and the Showgirl	Laurence Olivier	Laurence Olivier
**1957** (11th)	The Shiralee	Leslie Norman	Michael Balcon, Jack Rix
**1957** (11th)	Windom's Way	Ronald Neame	John Bryan
**1958** (12th)	**Room at the Top**	**Jack Clayton**	**James Woolf, John Woolf**
**1958** (12th)	Ice Cold in Alex	J. Lee Thompson	W. A. Whittaker
**1958** (12th)	Indiscreet	Stanley Donen	Stanley Donen
**1958** (12th)	Orders to Kill	Anthony Asquith	Anthony Havelock-Allan
**1958** (12th)	Sea of Sand	Guy Green	Robert S. Baker, Monty Berman
**1959** (13th)	**Sapphire**	**Basil Dearden**	**Michael Relph**
**1959** (13th)	Look Back in Anger	Tony Richardson	Harry Saltzman
**1959** (13th)	North West Frontier	J. Lee Thompson	Marcel Hellman
**1959** (13th)	Tiger Bay	J. Lee Thompson	John Hawkesworth, Leslie Parkyn, Julian Wintle
**1959** (13th)	Yesterday's Enemy	Val Guest	Michael Carreras

=== 1960s ===
Year	Film	Director(s)	Producer(s)
**1960** (14th)	**Saturday Night and Sunday Morning**	**Karel Reisz**	**Tony Richardson**
**1960** (14th)	The Angry Silence	Guy Green	Richard Attenborough, Bryan Forbes
**1960** (14th)	The Trials of Oscar Wilde	Ken Hughes	Irving Allen, Albert R. Broccoli, Harold Huth
**1960** (14th)	Tunes of Glory	Ronald Neame	Colin Lesslie
**1961** (15th)	**A Taste of Honey**	**Tony Richardson**	**Tony Richardson**
**1961** (15th)	The Innocents	Jack Clayton	Jack Clayton
**1961** (15th)	The Long and the Short and the Tall	Leslie Norman	Michael Balcon
**1961** (15th)	The Sundowners	Fred Zinnemann	Gerry Blattner
**1961** (15th)	Whistle Down the Wind	Bryan Forbes	Richard Attenborough
**1962** (16th)	**Lawrence of Arabia**	**David Lean**	**Sam Spiegel**
**1962** (16th)	Billy Budd	Peter Ustinov	Peter Ustinov
**1962** (16th)	A Kind of Loving	John Schlesinger	Joseph Janni
**1962** (16th)	The L-Shaped Room	Bryan Forbes	Richard Attenborough, James Woolf
**1962** (16th)	Only Two Can Play	Sidney Gilliat	Leslie Gilliat
**1963** (17th)	**Tom Jones**	**Tony Richardson**	**Tony Richardson**
**1963** (17th)	Billy Liar	John Schlesinger	Joseph Janni
**1963** (17th)	The Servant	Joseph Losey	Joseph Losey, Norman Priggen
**1963** (17th)	This Sporting Life	Lindsay Anderson	Karel Reisz
**1964** (18th)	**Dr. Strangelove or: How I Learned to Stop Worrying and Love the Bomb**	**Stanley Kubrick**	**Stanley Kubrick**
**1964** (18th)	Becket	Peter Glenville	Hal B. Wallis
**1964** (18th)	The Pumpkin Eater	Jack Clayton	James Woolf
**1964** (18th)	The Train	John Frankenheimer	Jules Bricken
**1965** (19th)	**The IPCRESS File**	**Sidney J. Furie**	**Harry Saltzman**
**1965** (19th)	Darling	John Schlesinger	Joseph Janni
**1965** (19th)	The Hill	Sidney Lumet	Kenneth Hyman
**1965** (19th)	The Knack ...and How to Get It	Richard Lester	Oscar Lewenstein
**1966** (20th)	**The Spy Who Came in from the Cold**	**Martin Ritt**	**Martin Ritt**
**1966** (20th)	Alfie	Lewis Gilbert	Lewis Gilbert
**1966** (20th)	Georgy Girl	Silvio Narizzano	Robert A. Goldston, Otto Plaschkes
**1966** (20th)	Morgan – A Suitable Case for Treatment	Karel Reisz	Leon Clore
**1967** (21st)	**A Man For All Seasons**	**Fred Zinnemann**	**Fred Zinnemann**
**1967** (21st)	Accident	Joseph Losey	Joseph Losey, Norman Priggen
**1967** (21st)	Blow-Up	Michelangelo Antonioni	Carlo Ponti
**1967** (21st)	The Deadly Affair	Sidney Lumet	Sidney Lumet

=== 1990s ===
Year	Film	Director(s)	Producer(s)
**1992** (46th)	**The Crying Game**	**Neil Jordan**	**Stephen Woolley**
**1993** (47th)	**Shadowlands**	**Richard Attenborough**	**Brian Eastman**
**1993** (47th)	Tom & Viv	Brian Gilbert	Marc Samuelson, Harvey Kass, Peter Samuelson
**1993** (47th)	Naked	Mike Leigh	Simon Channing Williams
**1993** (47th)	Raining Stones	Ken Loach	Sally Hibbin
**1994** (48th)	**Shallow Grave**	**Danny Boyle**	**Andrew Macdonald**
**1994** (48th)	Backbeat	Iain Softley	Finola Dwyer
**1994** (48th)	Bhaji on the Beach	Gurinder Chadha	Nadine Marsh-Edwards
**1994** (48th)	Priest	Antonia Bird	George S. J. Faber
**1995** (49th)	**The Madness of King George**	**Nicholas Hytner**	**Stephen Evans, David Parfitt**
**1995** (49th)	Carrington	Christopher Hampton	Ronald Shedlo, John McGrath
**1995** (49th)	Trainspotting	Danny Boyle	Andrew Macdonald
**1995** (49th)	Land and Freedom	Ken Loach	Rebecca O'Brien
**1996** (50th)	**Secrets & Lies**	**Mike Leigh**	**Simon Channing Williams**
**1996** (50th)	Richard III	Richard Loncraine	Lisa Katselas Paré, Stephen Bayly
**1996** (50th)	Brassed Off	Mark Herman	Steve Abbott
**1996** (50th)	Carla's Song	Ken Loach	Sally Hibbin
**1997** (51st)	**Nil by Mouth**	**Gary Oldman**	**Luc Besson, Gary Oldman, Douglas Urbanski**
**1997** (51st)	The Full Monty	Peter Cattaneo	Uberto Pasolini
**1997** (51st)	Mrs Brown	John Madden	Sarah Curtis
**1997** (51st)	Regeneration	Gillies MacKinnon	Allan Scott, Peter R. Simpson
**1997** (51st)	The Borrowers	Peter Hewitt	Tim Bevan, Eric Fellner, Rachel Talalay
**1997** (51st)	Twenty Four Seven	Shane Meadows	Imogen West
**1998** (52nd)	**Elizabeth**	**Shekhar Kapur**	**Tim Bevan, Eric Fellner, Alison Owen**
**1998** (52nd)	Hilary and Jackie	Anand Tucker	Andy Paterson, Nicolas Kent
**1998** (52nd)	Little Voice	Mark Herman	Elizabeth Karlsen
**1998** (52nd)	Lock, Stock and Two Smoking Barrels	Guy Ritchie	Matthew Vaughn
**1998** (52nd)	Sliding Doors	Peter Howitt	Sydney Pollack, Philippa Braithwaite, William Horberg
**1999** (53rd)	**East Is East**	**Damien O'Donnell**	**Leslee Udwin**
**1999** (53rd)	Notting Hill	Roger Michell	Duncan Kenworthy
**1999** (53rd)	Topsy-Turvy	Mike Leigh	Simon Channing Williams
**1999** (53rd)	Wonderland	Michael Winterbottom	Michele Camarda, Andrew Eaton
**1999** (53rd)	Ratcatcher	Lynne Ramsay	Gavin Emerson
**1999** (53rd)	Onegin	Martha Fiennes	Ileen Maisel, Simon Bosanquet

=== 2000s ===
Year	Film	Director(s)	Producer(s)
**2000** (54th)	**Billy Elliot**	**Stephen Daldry**	**Greg Brenman, Jon Finn**
**2000** (54th)	Chicken Run	Nick Park	Peter Lord, David Sproxton
**2000** (54th)	Sexy Beast	Jonathan Glazer	Jeremy Thomas
**2000** (54th)	Last Resort	Paweł Pawlikowski	Ruth Caleb
**2000** (54th)	The House of Mirth	Terence Davies	Olivia Stewart
**2001** (55th)	**Gosford Park**	**Robert Altman**	**Bob Balaban, David Levy**
**2001** (55th)	Bridget Jones's Diary	Sharon Maguire	Tim Bevan, Eric Fellner, Jonathan Cavendish
**2001** (55th)	Harry Potter and the Philosopher's Stone	Chris Columbus	David Heyman
**2001** (55th)	Iris	Richard Eyre	Robert Fox, Scott Rudin
**2001** (55th)	Me Without You	Sandra Goldbacher	Finola Dwyer
**2002** (56th)	**The Warrior**	**Asif Kapadia**	**Bertrand Faivre**
**2002** (56th)	The Hours	Stephen Daldry	Scott Rudin, Robert Fox
**2002** (56th)	Dirty Pretty Things	Stephen Frears	Tracey Seaward, Robert Jones
**2002** (56th)	Bend It Like Beckham	Gurinder Chadha	Deepak Nayar
**2002** (56th)	The Magdalene Sisters	Peter Mullan	Frances Higson
**2003** (57th)	**Touching the Void**	**Kevin Macdonald**	**John Smithson**
**2003** (57th)	Cold Mountain	Anthony Minghella	Sydney Pollack, William Horberg, Albert Berger, Ron Yerxa
**2003** (57th)	Girl with a Pearl Earring	Peter Webber	Anand Tucker, Andy Paterson
**2003** (57th)	Love Actually	Richard Curtis	Duncan Kenworthy, Tim Bevan, Eric Fellner
**2003** (57th)	In This World	Michael Winterbottom	Andrew Eaton, Anita Overland
**2004** (58th)	**My Summer of Love**	**Paweł Pawlikowski**	**Chris Collins, Tanya Seghatchian**
**2004** (58th)	Vera Drake	Mike Leigh	Simon Channing Williams, Alain Sarde
**2004** (58th)	Harry Potter and the Prisoner of Azkaban	Alfonso Cuarón	David Heyman, Chris Columbus, Mark Radcliffe
**2004** (58th)	Shaun of the Dead	Edgar Wright	Nira Park
**2004** (58th)	Dead Man's Shoes	Shane Meadows	Mark Herbert
**2005** (59th)	**Wallace & Gromit: The Curse of the Were-Rabbit**	**Steve Box and Nick Park**	**Bob Baker, Claire Jennings, David Sproxton**
**2005** (59th)	The Constant Gardener	Fernando Meirelles	Simon Channing Williams, Jeffrey Caine
**2005** (59th)	Pride & Prejudice	Joe Wright	Tim Bevan, Eric Fellner, Paul Webster, Deborah Moggach
**2005** (59th)	A Cock and Bull Story	Michael Winterbottom	Andrew Eaton, Martin Hardy
**2005** (59th)	Festival	Annie Griffin	Christopher Young
**2006** (60th)	**The Last King of Scotland**	**Kevin Macdonald**	**Lisa Bryer, Andrea Calderwood, Peter Morgan, Charles Steel**
**2006** (60th)	The Queen	Stephen Frears	Tracey Seaward, Christine Langan, Andy Harries, Peter Morgan
**2006** (60th)	Casino Royale	Martin Campbell	Michael G. Wilson, Barbara Broccoli, Robert Wade, Paul Haggis, Neal Purvis
**2006** (60th)	United 93	Paul Greengrass	Tim Bevan, Lloyd Levin
**2006** (60th)	Notes on a Scandal	Richard Eyre	Scott Rudin, Robert Fox
**2007** (61st)	**This Is England**	**Shane Meadows**	**Mark Herbert**
**2007** (61st)	Atonement	Joe Wright	Tim Bevan, Eric Fellner, Paul Webster
**2007** (61st)	The Bourne Ultimatum	Paul Greengrass	Patrick Crowley, Frank Marshall, Paul L. Sandberg, Doug Liman
**2007** (61st)	Control	Anton Corbijn	Tony Wilson, Deborah Curtis
**2007** (61st)	Eastern Promises	David Cronenberg	Paul Webster, Robert Lantos
**2008** (62nd)	**Man on Wire**	**James Marsh**	**Simon Chinn**
**2008** (62nd)	Hunger	Steve McQueen	Laura Hastings-Smith, Robin Gutch
**2008** (62nd)	In Bruges	Martin McDonagh	Graham Broadbent, Peter Czernin
**2008** (62nd)	Mamma Mia!	Phyllida Lloyd	Judy Craymer, Benny Andersson, Björn Ulvaeus, Phyllida Lloyd, Tom Hanks, Rita Wilson
**2008** (62nd)	Slumdog Millionaire	Danny Boyle, Loveleen Tandan	Christian Colson
**2009** (63rd)	**Fish Tank**	**Andrea Arnold**	**Andrea Arnold, Kees Kasander, Nick Laws**
**2009** (63rd)	An Education	Lone Scherfig	Finola Dwyer, Amanda Posey, Lone Scherfig, Nick Hornby
**2009** (63rd)	In the Loop	Armando Iannucci	Kevin Loader, Adam Tandy, Armando Iannucci, Jesse Armstrong, Simon Blackwell, Tony Roche
**2009** (63rd)	Moon	Duncan Jones	Stuart Fenegan, Trudie Styler, Duncan Jones, Nathan Parker
**2009** (63rd)	Nowhere Boy	Sam Taylor-Wood	Robert Bernstein, Douglas Rae, Kevin Loader, Sam Taylor-Johnson, Matt Greenhalgh

=== 2010s ===
Year	Film	Director(s)	Producer(s)
**2010** (64th)	**The King's Speech**	**Tom Hooper**	**Iain Canning, Tom Hooper, Emile Sherman, Gareth Unwin**
**2010** (64th)	127 Hours	Danny Boyle	Danny Boyle, Christian Colson, John Smithson
**2010** (64th)	Another Year	Mike Leigh	Mike Leigh, Georgina Lowe
**2010** (64th)	Four Lions	Chris Morris	Chris Morris, Mark Herbert, Derrin Schlesinger
**2010** (64th)	Made in Dagenham	Nigel Cole	Nigel Cole, Stephen Woolley, Elizabeth Karlsen
**2011** (65th)	**Tinker Tailor Soldier Spy**	**Tomas Alfredson**	**Tomas Alfredson, Tim Bevan, Eric Fellner, Bridget O'Connor, Robyn Slovo, Peter Straughan**
**2011** (65th)	My Week with Marilyn	Simon Curtis	Simon Curtis, Adrian Hodges, David Parfitt, Harvey Weinstein
**2011** (65th)	Senna	Asif Kapadia	Tim Bevan, Eric Fellner, James Gay-Rees, Asif Kapadia, Manish Pandey
**2011** (65th)	Shame	Steve McQueen	Emile Sherman, Abi Morgan, Steve McQueen, Iain Canning
**2011** (65th)	We Need to Talk About Kevin	Lynne Ramsay	Jennifer Fox, Rory Stewart Kinnear, Lynne Ramsay, Luc Roeg, Robert Salerno
**2012** (66th)	**Skyfall**	**Sam Mendes**	**Barbara Broccoli, John Logan, Sam Mendes, Neal Purvis, Robert Wade, Michael G. Wilson**
**2012** (66th)	Anna Karenina	Joe Wright	Joe Wright, Tim Bevan, Eric Fellner, Paul Webster, Tom Stoppard
**2012** (66th)	The Best Exotic Marigold Hotel	John Madden	John Madden, Graham Broadbent, Pete Czernin, Oliver Parker
**2012** (66th)	Les Misérables	Tom Hooper	Tom Hooper, Tim Bevan, Eric Fellner, Debra Hayward, Cameron Mackintosh, William Nicholson, Alain Boublil, Claude-Michel Schönberg, Herbert Kretzmer
**2012** (66th)	Seven Psychopaths	Martin McDonagh	Martin McDonagh, Graham Broadbent, Pete Czernin
**2013** (67th)	**Gravity**	**Alfonso Cuarón**	**Alfonso Cuarón, Jonás Cuarón, David Heyman**
**2013** (67th)	Mandela: Long Walk to Freedom	Justin Chadwick	Justin Chadwick, Anant Singh, David M. Thompson, William Nicholson
**2013** (67th)	Philomena	Stephen Frears	Gabrielle Tana, Steve Coogan, Tracey Seaward
**2013** (67th)	Rush	Ron Howard	Ron Howard, Andrew Eaton, Peter Morgan
**2013** (67th)	Saving Mr. Banks	John Lee Hancock	Alison Owen, Ian Collie, Philip Steuer, Kelly Marcel, Sue Smith
**2013** (67th)	The Selfish Giant	Clio Barnard	Tracy O'Riordan
**2014** (68th)	**The Theory of Everything**	**James Marsh**	**Tim Bevan, Lisa Bruce, Eric Fellner, Anthony McCarten**
**2014** (68th)	'71	Yann Demange	Angus Lamont, Robin Gutch, Gregory Burke
**2014** (68th)	Paddington	Paul King	David Heyman
**2014** (68th)	Pride	Matthew Warchus	David Livingstone, Stephen Beresford
**2014** (68th)	The Imitation Game	Morten Tyldum	Nora Grossman, Ido Ostrowsky, Teddy Schwarzman
**2014** (68th)	Under the Skin	Jonathan Glazer	James Wilson, Nick Wechsler, Walter Campbell
**2015** (69th)	**Brooklyn**	**John Crowley**	**John Crowley, Finola Dwyer, Nick Hornby, Amanda Posey**
**2015** (69th)	45 Years	Andrew Haigh	Andrew Haigh, Tristan Goligher
**2015** (69th)	Amy	Asif Kapadia	James Gay-Rees
**2015** (69th)	The Danish Girl	Tom Hooper	Tom Hooper, Tim Bevan, Eric Fellner, Anne Harrison, Gail Mutrux, Lucinda Coxon
**2015** (69th)	Ex Machina	Alex Garland	Andrew Macdonald, Allon Reich
**2015** (69th)	The Lobster	Yorgos Lanthimos	Ceci Dempsey, Ed Guiney, Lee Magiday, Efthimis Filippou
**2016** (70th)	**I, Daniel Blake**	**Ken Loach**	**Paul Laverty, Ken Loach, Rebecca O'Brien**
**2016** (70th)	American Honey	Andrea Arnold	Andrea Arnold, Lars Knudsen, Pouya Shahbazian, Jay Van Hoy
**2016** (70th)	Denial	Mick Jackson	Mick Jackson, Gary Foster, Russ Krasnoff, David Hare
**2016** (70th)	Fantastic Beasts and Where to Find Them	David Yates	David Yates, J. K. Rowling, David Heyman, Steve Kloves, Lionel Wigram
**2016** (70th)	Notes on Blindness	Peter Middleton, James Spinney	Peter Middleton, James Spinney, Mike Brett, Jo-Jo Ellison, Steve Jamison
**2016** (70th)	Under the Shadow	Babak Anvari	Babak Anvari, Emily Leo, Oliver Roskill, Lucan Toh
**2017** (71st)	**Three Billboards Outside Ebbing, Missouri**	**Martin McDonagh**	**Graham Broadbent, Peter Czernin, Martin McDonagh**
**2017** (71st)	Darkest Hour	Joe Wright	Joe Wright, Tim Bevan, Lisa Bruce, Eric Fellner, Anthony McCarten, Douglas Urbanski
**2017** (71st)	The Death of Stalin	Armando Iannucci	Armando Iannucci, Kevin Loader, Laurent Zeitoun, Yann Zenou, Ian Martin, David Schneider
**2017** (71st)	God's Own Country	Francis Lee	Francis Lee, Manon Ardisson, Jack Tarling
**2017** (71st)	Lady Macbeth	William Oldroyd	William Oldroyd, Fodhla Cronin O'Reilly, Alice Birch
**2017** (71st)	Paddington 2	Paul King	Paul King, David Heyman, Simon Farnaby
**2018** (72nd)	**The Favourite**	**Yorgos Lanthimos**	**Deborah Davis, Ceci Dempsey, Ed Guiney, Yorgos Lanthimos, Lee Magiday, Tony McNamara**
**2018** (72nd)	Beast	Michael Pearce	Michael Pearce, Kristian Brodie, Lauren Dark, Ivana MacKinnon
**2018** (72nd)	Bohemian Rhapsody	Bryan Singer (Note: Bryan Singer was replaced by Dexter Fletcher near the end of principal photography; Singer retained sole director credit in accordance with Directors Guild of America rules. Fletcher is credited as an executive producer.)	Graham King, Anthony McCarten
**2018** (72nd)	McQueen	Ian Bonhôte	Ian Bonhôte, Peter Ettedgui, Andee Ryder, Nick Taussig
**2018** (72nd)	Stan & Ollie	Jon S. Baird	Jon S. Baird, Faye Ward, Jeff Pope
**2018** (72nd)	You Were Never Really Here	Lynne Ramsay	Lynne Ramsay, Rosa Attab, Pascal Caucheteux, James Wilson
**2019** (73rd)	**1917**	**Sam Mendes**	**Pippa Harris, Callum McDougall, Sam Mendes, Jayne-Ann Tenggren, Krysty Wilson-Cairns**
**2019** (73rd)	Bait	Mark Jenkin	Mark Jenkin, Kate Byers, Linn Waite
**2019** (73rd)	For Sama	Waad Al-Khateab & Edward Watts	Waad Al-Khateab, Edward Watts
**2019** (73rd)	Rocketman	Dexter Fletcher	Dexter Fletcher, Adam Bohling, David Furnish, David Reid, Matthew Vaughn, Lee Hall
**2019** (73rd)	Sorry We Missed You	Ken Loach	Ken Loach, Rebecca O'Brien, Paul Laverty
**2019** (73rd)	The Two Popes	Fernando Meirelles	Fernando Meirelles, Jonathan Eirich, Dan Lin, Tracey Seaward, Anthony McCarten

=== 2020s ===
Year	Film	Director(s)	Producer(s)
**2020** (74th)	**Promising Young Woman**	**Emerald Fennell**	**Ben Browning, Emerald Fennell, Ashley Fox, Josey McNamara**
**2020** (74th)	Calm with Horses	Nick Rowland	Nick Rowland, Daniel Emmerson, Joe Murtagh
**2020** (74th)	The Dig	Simon Stone	Simon Stone, Gabrielle Tana, Moira Buffini
**2020** (74th)	The Father	Florian Zeller	Florian Zeller, Philippe Carcassonne, Jean-Louis Livi, David Parfitt, Christopher Hampton
**2020** (74th)	His House	Remi Weekes	Remi Weekes, Martin Gentles, Edward King, Roy Lee
**2020** (74th)	Limbo	Ben Sharrock	Ben Sharrock, Irune Gurtubai, Angus Lamont
**2020** (74th)	The Mauritanian	Kevin Macdonald	Kevin Macdonald, Adam Ackland, Leah Clarke, Beatriz Levin, Lloyd Levin, Rory Haines, Sohrab Noshirvani, M.B. Traven
**2020** (74th)	Mogul Mowgli	Bassam Tariq	Bassam Tariq, Riz Ahmed, Thomas Benski, Bennett McGhee
**2020** (74th)	Rocks	Sarah Gavron	Sarah Gavron, Ameenah Ayub Allen, Faye Ward, Theresa Ikoko, Claire Wilson
**2020** (74th)	Saint Maud	Rose Glass	Rose Glass, Andrea Cornwell, Oliver Kassman
**2021** (75th)	**Belfast**	**Kenneth Branagh**	**Laura Berwick, Kenneth Branagh, Becca Kovacik, Tamar Thomas**
**2021** (75th)	After Love	Aleem Khan	Matthieu de Braconier, Gabrielle Dumon
**2021** (75th)	Ali & Ava	Clio Barnard	Tracy O'Riordan
**2021** (75th)	Boiling Point	Philip Barantini	Hester Ruoff, Bart Ruspoli
**2021** (75th)	Cyrano	Joe Wright	Tim Bevan, Eric Fellner, Guy Heeley
**2021** (75th)	Everybody's Talking About Jamie	Johnathan Butterell	Mark Herbert, Peter Carlton, Arnon Milchan
**2021** (75th)	House of Gucci	Ridley Scott	Ridley Scott, Giannina Facio Scott, Kevin J. Walsh, Mark Huffam
**2021** (75th)	Last Night in Soho	Edgar Wright	Nira Park, Tim Bevan, Eric Fellner, Edgar Wright
**2021** (75th)	No Time to Die	Cary Joji Fukunaga	Michael G. Wilson, Barbara Broccoli
**2021** (75th)	Passing	Rebecca Hall	Nina Yang Bongiovi, Forest Whitaker, Margot Hand, Rebecca Hall
**2022** (76th)	**The Banshees of Inisherin**	**Martin McDonagh**	**Graham Broadbent, Pete Czernin, Martin McDonagh**
**2022** (76th)	Aftersun	Charlotte Wells	
**2022** (76th)	Brian and Charles	Jim Archer	Jim Archer, Rupert Majendie, David Earl, Chris Hayward
**2022** (76th)	Empire of Light	Sam Mendes	Sam Mendes, Pippa Harris
**2022** (76th)	Good Luck to You, Leo Grande	Sophie Hyde	Sophie Hyde, Debbie Gray, Adrian Politowski, Katy Brand
**2022** (76th)	Living	Oliver Hermanus	Oliver Hermanus, Elizabeth Karlsen, Stephen Woolley, Kazuo Ishiguro
**2022** (76th)	Roald Dahl's Matilda the Musical	Matthew Warchus	Matthew Warchus, Tim Bevan, Eric Fellner, Jon Finn, Luke Kelly, Dennis Kelly
**2022** (76th)	See How They Run	Tom George	Tom George, Gina Carter, Damian Jones, Mark Chappell
**2022** (76th)	The Swimmers	Sally El Hosaini	Sally El Hosaini, Jack Thorne
**2022** (76th)	The Wonder	Sebastián Lelio	Sebastián Lelio, Ed Guiney, Juliette Howell, Andrew Lowe, Tessa Ross, Alice Birch, Emma Donoghue
**2023** (77th)	**The Zone of Interest**	**Jonathan Glazer**	**James Wilson, Ewa Puszczyńska**
**2023** (77th)	All of Us Strangers	Andrew Haigh	Graham Broadbent, Pete Czernin, Sarah Harvey
**2023** (77th)	How to Have Sex	Molly Manning Walker	Emily Leo, Ivana MacKinnon, Konstantinos Kontovrakis
**2023** (77th)	Napoleon	Ridley Scott	Ridley Scott, Kevin J. Walsh, Mark Huffam, Joaquin Phoenix
**2023** (77th)	The Old Oak	Ken Loach	Rebecca O'Brien
**2023** (77th)	Poor Things	Yorgos Lanthimos	Yorgos Lanthimos, Ed Guiney, Andrew Lowe, Emma Stone
**2023** (77th)	Rye Lane	Raine Allen-Miller	Yvonne Isimeme Ibazebo, Damian Jones
**2023** (77th)	Saltburn	Emerald Fennell	Emerald Fennell, Josey McNamara, Margot Robbie
**2023** (77th)	Scrapper	Charlotte Regan	Theo Barrowclough
**2023** (77th)	Wonka	Paul King	David Heyman, Alexandra Derbyshire, Luke Kelly
**2024** (78th)	**Conclave**	**Edward Berger**	**Tessa Ross, Juliette Howell, Michael A. Jackman, and Peter Straughan**
**2024** (78th)	Bird	Andrea Arnold	Andrea Arnold, Tessa Ross, Juliette Howell, and Lee Groombridge
**2024** (78th)	Blitz	Steve McQueen	Steve McQueen, Tim Bevan, Eric Fellner, and Anita Overland
**2024** (78th)	Gladiator II	Ridley Scott	Ridley Scott, Douglas Wick, Lucy Fisher, Michael Pruss, David Scarpa, and Peter Craig
**2024** (78th)	Hard Truths	Mike Leigh	Georgina Lowe
**2024** (78th)	Kneecap	Rich Peppiatt	Trevor Birney, Jack Tarling, Naoise Ó Cairealláin, Liam Óg Ó Hannaidh, and JJ Ó Dochartaigh
**2024** (78th)	Lee	Ellen Kuras	Kate Solomon, Kate Winslet, Liz Hannah, Marion Hume, John Collee, and Lem Dobbs
**2024** (78th)	Love Lies Bleeding	Rose Glass	Andrea Cornwell, Oliver Kassman, and Weronika Tofilska
**2024** (78th)	The Outrun	Nora Fingscheidt	Sarah Brocklehurst, Dominic Norris, Jack Lowden, Saoirse Ronan, and Amy Liptrot
**2024** (78th)	Wallace & Gromit: Vengeance Most Fowl	Nick Park & Merlin Crossingham	Richard Beek, and Mark Burton
**2025** (79th)	**Hamnet**	**Chloé Zhao**	**Liza Marshall, Pippa Harris, Nicolas Gonda, Steven Spielberg, Sam Mendes, and Maggie O'Farrell**
**2025** (79th)	28 Years Later	Danny Boyle	Andrew Macdonald, Peter Rice, Bernard Bellew, Danny Boyle and Alex Garland
**2025** (79th)	The Ballad of Wallis Island	James Griffiths	Rupert Majendie, Tom Basden, and Tim Key
**2025** (79th)	Bridget Jones: Mad About the Boy	Michael Morris	Tim Bevan, Eric Fellner, Jo Wallett, Helen Fielding, Dan Mazer, and Abi Morgan
**2025** (79th)	Die My Love	Lynne Ramsay	Martin Scorsese, Jennifer Lawrence, Justine Cirrocchi, Andrea Calderwood, Enda Walsh, and Alice Birch
**2025** (79th)	H Is for Hawk	Philippa Lowthorpe	Dede Gardner, Jeremy Kleiner, and Emma Donoghue
**2025** (79th)	I Swear	Kirk Jones	Georgia Bayliff, Kirk Jones and Piers Tempest
**2025** (79th)	Mr Burton	Marc Evans	Ed Talfan, Josh Hyams, Hannah Thomas, Trevor Matthews, and Tom Bullough
**2025** (79th)	Pillion	Harry Lighton	Emma Norton, Lee Groombridge, Ed Guiney, and Andrew Lowe
**2025** (79th)	Steve	Tim Mielants	Alan Moloney, Cillian Murphy, and Max Porter

== Multiple wins and nominations ==
From 1992 onwards

=== Multiple wins ===
Wins	Winner
4	Tim Bevan
4	Eric Fellner
2	Graham Broadbent
2	Peter Czernin
2	James Marsh
2	Martin McDonagh
2	Sam Mendes
2	Peter Straughan
