= Roy Horniman =

British writer (1868–1930)

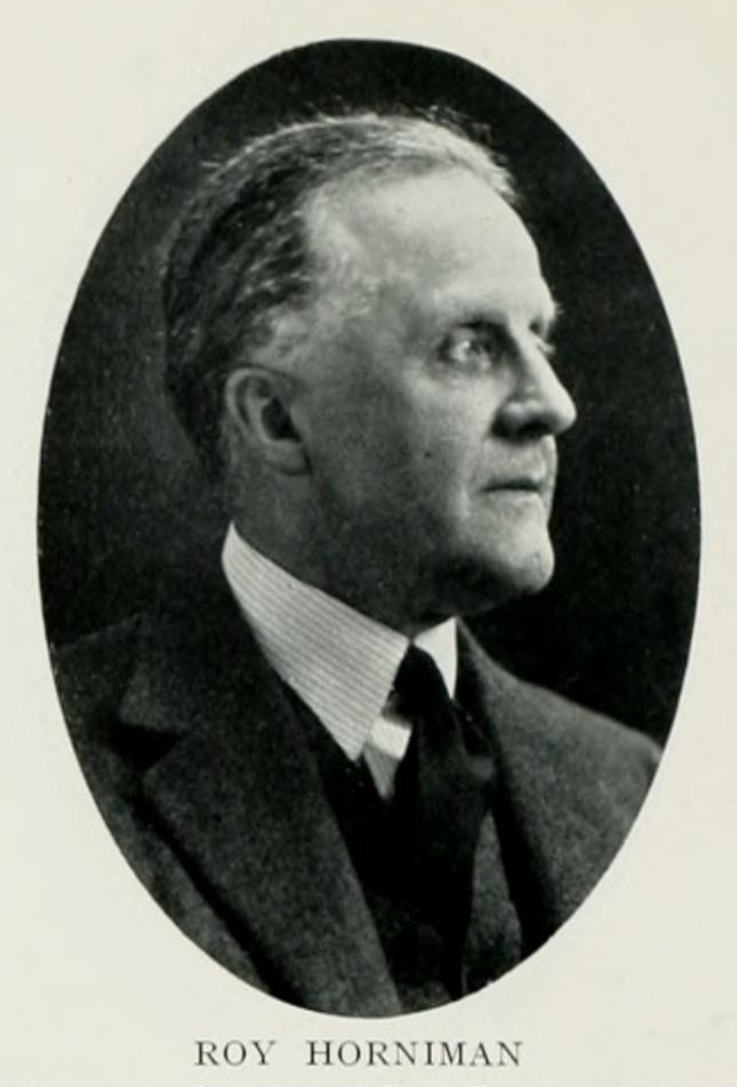
- Photographic portrait of Roy Horniman (about 1922).
- Born: Robert Horniman; 31 July 1868; Southsea, Hampshire
- Died: 11 October 1930 (aged 62); Notting Hill, London
- Occupations: actor, writer
- Writing career
- Pen name: 'Layton Foster', Roy Horniman

Roy Horniman (born Robert Horniman; 31 July 1868 – 11 October 1930) was a prolific British playwright and novelist, most prominently active during the Edwardian era. He published many short stories and novels and wrote original plays, as well as dramatic adaptations of novels and plays by other authors. After World War I, he extended his writing to film screenplays. Horniman was a vegetarian and a nature curist. He was devoted to the cause of animal welfare, in particular the protection and care of working horses, and was opposed to vivisection.

Horniman's 1907 novel, Israel Rank: The Autobiography of a Criminal, was used as the basis of the screenplay of the highly-regarded 1949 black comedy Kind Hearts and Coronets and inspired the 2013 Broadway musical A Gentleman's Guide to Love and Murder.

== Early life ==
Robert Horniman was born on 31 July 1868 at Southsea, near Portsmouth in Hampshire, the eldest son of William Horniman and Sarah Esther (née Foster).^{[A]} His father was an English naval officer and paymaster-in-chief of the British Royal Navy. Robert was educated at Bruges in Belgium and at Southsea Grammar School.

When he was aged thirteen, Horniman wrote a novel that was confiscated by his mother.

== Career ==
=== Playwright and novelist ===
After he left school, Horniman briefly worked in an office. In 1887 he embarked on an acting career calling himself 'Roy' Horniman, a name he retained throughout his life and professional career as an actor, writer and dramatist.

As an actor, Horniman played in a number of dramatic productions in various West End theatres. He was a cast member in the following stage productions: Echo at the Trafalgar Square Theatre (April 1893), The Super at the Criterion Theatre (May 1894), Romeo and Juliet at the Prince of Wales' Theatre (May 1896), Uncle Thatcher at the Court Theatre (June and July 1896), The Littlest Girl at the Court Theatre (July 1896) and Number One Round the Corner at the Court Theatre (October to December 1896). Horniman was also a cast member in Shakespeare's Hamlet at the Lyceum Theatre in late 1897 and late 1898 and the successful original London production of the musical comedy Florodora at the Lyric Theatre from late 1899 to March 1901.

Horniman was described as "a wealthy bachelor and admirer of Oscar Wilde" and "a lesser follower of Wilde in his Dorian Gray mode". Wilde's The Picture of Dorian Gray was published in 1891. Horniman was described by a contemporary as "a well-to-do bachelor who knew what did and what did not suit him, marriage being in the latter category, the social round in the former".

During the 1890s Horniman established himself as a writer, initially contributing short stories to literary magazines. By the end of the decade he had one of his plays produced in a West End theatre. Horniman's play, Judy, was produced at the Prince of Wales' Theatre in May 1899.

Horniman's first novel The Sin of Atlantis, published in 1900, had an occultist theme involving past lives and the submerged continent of Atlantis. A reviewer writing in The Athenæum described Horniman's English as "occasionally slipshod", adding: "but he has ingenuity and imagination, and from most unpromising material has produced a readable story".

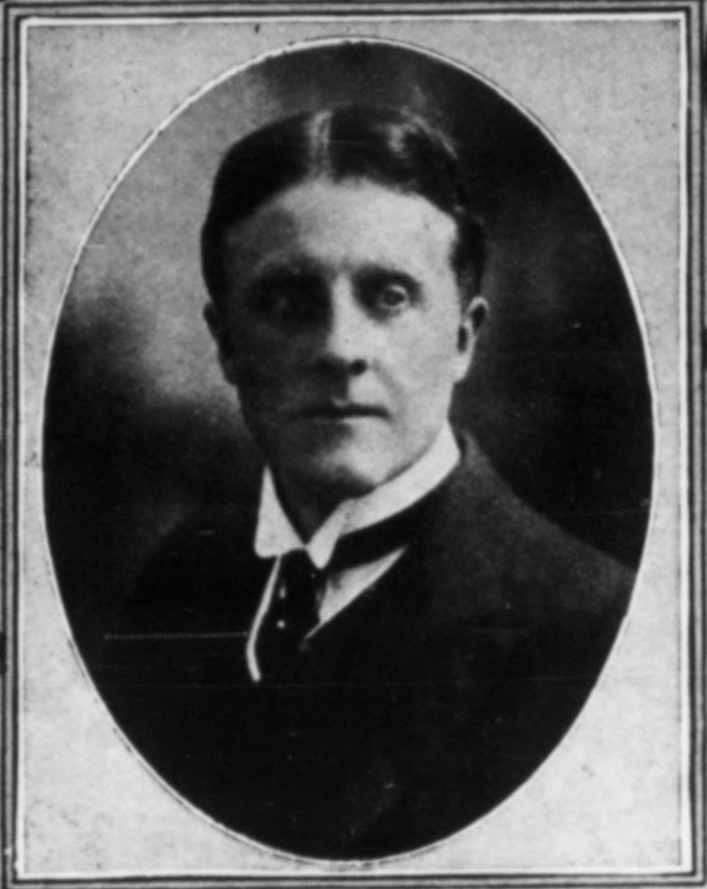
Horniman in 1908

In January 1903 a three-act play called John Lester, Parson was produced in matinee performances at the Lyric Theatre in London's West End. The play was written by 'Knight Rider' and 'Layton Foster', pseudonyms of Archibald Keen and Roy Horniman. The production of Lady Flirt, Horniman's adaptation of the French language Madame Flirt by Paul Gavault and Georges Berr, opened in May 1904 at the Haymarket Theatre in London.

Two novels by Horniman were published by T. Fisher Unwin in 1903, The Living Buddha and That Fast Miss Blount. His novel Bellamy the Magnificent was published in 1904 by Chatto & Windus, which a reviewer described as "extremely diverting, and an easy popularity may safely be predicted for it".

Horniman was devoted to various causes, including anti-vivisection. He was also a vegetarian and a crusader against censorship. He was closely associated with several charities, especially in the field of animal welfare. Horniman served as chairman of Our Dumb Friends' League and the Committee for the Suppression of Cruelty to Performing Animals. Our Dumb Friends League was founded in May 1897 to care for working horses on the streets of London.

In 1907 Horniman was described as "a vegetarian, a nature curist, a Theosophist [and] a public singer". At about that stage he was also the joint-proprietor of The Ladies' Review. Horniman was the founder and part-owner with Kate Emil Behnke of the 'Broadlands Nature Cure Sanatorium' at Medstead in Hampshire, the first 'nature-cure' establishment in England.

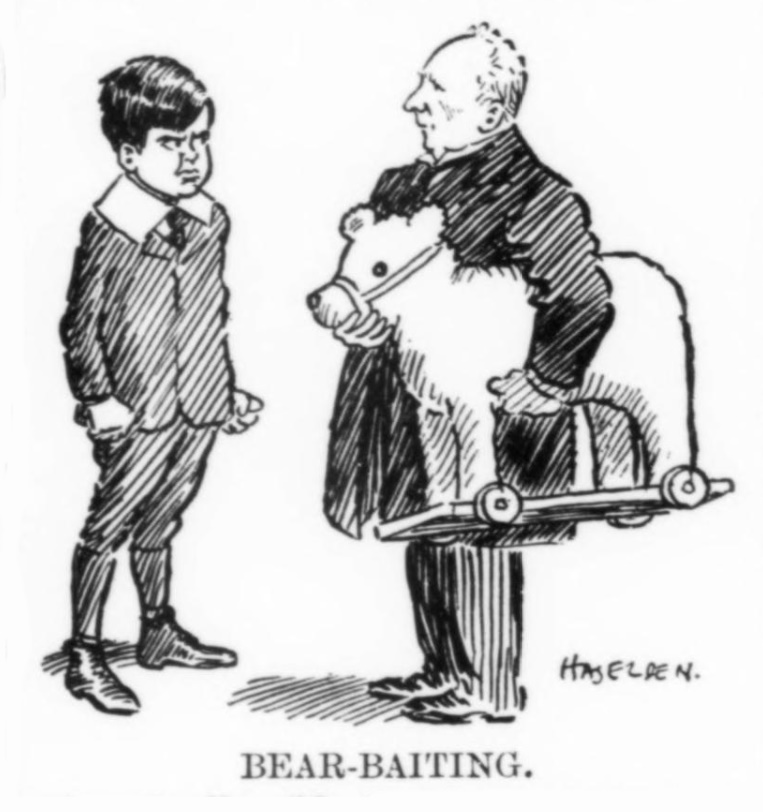
"Bear-Baiting", by William Haselden: a scene from Horniman's Billy's Fortune, 1913

In 1907 Horniman's novel Israel Rank: The Autobiography of a Criminal was published by Chatto & Windus. The plot of the novel, described as "self-consciously decadent", was summarised as "the despised offspring of an aristocratic lady who married beneath her, wreaking his revenge by murdering his way coldbloodedly through his entire family to fortune and a title". The novel's protagonist justifies his actions by taking on the role of "a Nietzschean superman above mere human morality". Two other of Horniman's novels were published in 1907: A Nonconformist Parson and Lord Cammarleigh's Secret: A Fairy Story of To-Day.

A four-act play written by Horniman, The Education of Elizabeth, described as a "blend of domestic melodrama and comedy", was produced in October 1907 at the Apollo Theatre. The Walk, a duologue by Horniman, was produced at the Apollo in January 1908, followed by Thumbs Down, another of his plays. At the Garrick Theatre in September 1908 the melodramatic play Idols was produced, an adaptation by Horniman of W. J. Locke's novel of the same name. Horniman's Bellamy the Magnificent, a five-act play described as a "social extravaganza" (and based on his 1904 novel of the same name), was produced by Sir Charles Wyndham at the New Theatre in October 1908. 1908 had been a successful year for Horniman, Two of his original plays and one adaptation were produced in London, prompting one writer for The Tatler to describe Horniman as a "talented dramatist" and compare "the prodigality of his talents" to those of Somerset Maugham.

Horniman rented and managed the Criterion Theatre in London's West End, possibly in the period 1913 and 1914 when two of his plays were produced at the theatre. Billy's Fortune, written by Horniman, opened in January 1913 at the Criterion. One reviewer wrote: "While there is nothing startlingly original in the plot, it is cleverly treated, and the play forms a capital entertainment". In June 1914 The Blue Mouse, an adaptation by Horniman of a German play by Alex. Engel and Julian Horst, was produced at the Criterion Theatre.

=== The war years ===
During the first years of World War I Horniman was treasurer of the Blue Cross Fund. In 1915 Horniman visited a Blue Cross hospital in France treating injured horses, reporting that the majority of cases were "deep and painful saddle cuts", with sabre and bullet wounds in the minority. Horniman was chairman of the Soldiers' and Sailors' Tobacco Fund, a body that organised to send tobacco to British armed forces.

In the early years of the war Horniman was "prompted by a distaste for profiteering" by private railway companies to write How to Make the Railways Pay for the War, a book that ran to three editions.

The Mystery of John Wake, a drama in three acts written by Horniman and Lechmere Worrall, was produced in April 1916 at the Gaiety Theatre in Hastings, on England's south coast. Horniman's play Three Weeks was an adaptation of Elinor Glyn's controversial novel of the same name. It opened at the Strand Theatre in July 1917.

=== Stage and screen ===
Horniman was an investor in the Gattie Transport Scheme and a director of the associated company, the New Transport Co. The scheme had been proposed in 1918 by the playwright, engineer and inventor Alfred Warwick Gattie, for "the more expeditious and economical handling of goods" by the railways and motor-lorries, based on a large clearing yard and special machinery to lift and sort the goods.^{[B]}

Horniman was a member of the British Committee of the Indian National Congress. Horniman's younger brother, B. G. Horniman, had been working as a journalist in India and in 1913 became founding editor of The Bombay Chronicle. Following the Jallianwala Bagh massacre at Amritsar in April 1919 he strongly condemned the actions of British officials and released photographs of the incident. In 1920 B. G. Horniman was deported from India by George Lloyd, the Governor of Bombay, under the Defence of India Act.

In the post-war years Roy Horniman wrote and adapted for both the stage and screen. The film A Non-conformist Parson (also known as Heart and Soul), based on Horniman's 1907 novel of the same name, was produced in March 1919 by the British Lion Film Corporation. The film starred George Keene, Constance Worth and Evan Thomas. It was directed by A. V. Bramble, with a screenplay written by Horniman and Eliot Stannard. In 1920 Horniman wrote the screenplay of Jennie, a film directed by Alan Crosland and produced by Selznick Pictures.

Horniman co-wrote the screenplay of The Education of Elizabeth with Elmer Harris, a film based on Horniman's 1907 play of the same name. The film starred Billie Burke and was directed by Edward Dillon; it was produced by the Famous Players-Lasky Corporation and released in the United States in January 1921.

In August 1921 the play The Edge O'Beyond, adapted by Horniman and Ruby Miller from a novel by Gertrude Page, opened at the Garrick Theatre in London's West End.

Horniman's play Love in Pawn was produced in March 1923 at the Kingsway Theatre in London. The play was described as a "picture of life in a Jewish home". In April 1923 it was reported that the producer of the play, Lewis Sloden, had returned to the United States, "disheartened at the apparent lack of public interest in the play". Sloden gave the use of the theatre to the players and management rent-free so the performances could continue on a co-operative basis. Love in Pawn was renamed The Money Lender for its production at the Ambassador Theatre in New York from August 1928.

Horniman was credited as one of the writers of A Gentleman of Paris, a Paramount Pictures film directed by Harry d'Abbadie d'Arrast and released in October 1927. The film was loosely based on Horniman's novel Bellamy the Magificent.

== Death and legacy ==
Roy Horniman died on 11 October 1930 at his home at 17 Stanley Crescent in Notting Hill in west London, aged 62.

The director and screenwriter Robert Hamer discovered Horniman's Israel Rank: The Autobiography of a Criminal, a novel written in 1907, and used it as the basis of the screenplay of the highly-regarded 1949 black comedy Kind Hearts and Coronets, directed by Hamer and produced by Michael Balcon of Ealing Studios. The novel was also adapted as the 2026 film How to Make a Killing.

Horniman's novel Israel Rank was also the inspiration for the 2013 Broadway musical A Gentleman's Guide to Love and Murder.

== Publications ==
- Roy Horniman & C. E. Morland (1894), "A Fatal Affinity" (short story), published in The Ludgate Illustrated Magazine, July 1894.
- Roy Horniman (1900), The Sin of Atlantis, London: John Macqueen.
- Roy Horniman (1903), The Living Buddha, London: T. Fisher Unwin.
- Roy Horniman (1903), That Fast Miss Blount: A Novel, London: T. Fisher Unwin.
- Roy Horniman (1904), Bellamy the Magnificent: An Extravaganza, London: Chatto & Windus.
- Roy Horniman (1906), "No Ball: A Phantasy of the Future" (illustrated by Frank Hart), The Xmas Idler, December 1908, pp. 298–307; originally published in June 1906.
- Roy Horniman (1907), A Nonconformist Parson, London: Sisley's Ltd.
- Roy Horniman (1907), Israel Rank: The Autobiography of a Criminal, London: Chatto & Windus.
- Roy Horniman (1907), Lord Cammarleigh's Secret: A Fairy Story of To-Day, London: Chatto & Windus.
- Roy Horniman (1909), Nightshade, London: Sisley's Ltd.
- Roy Horniman (1909), Romance of Beauty, London: Eveleigh Nash.
- Roy Horniman (1911), Captivity, London: Methuen & Co. Ltd.
- Roy Horniman (1913), Jenny: A Novel, London: Hurst & Blackett.
- Roy Horniman (1914), Animal Defence Societies and Horses in Warfare.
- Roy Horniman (1916), How to Make the Railways Pay for the War: Or, The Transport Problem Solved, London: George Routledge & Sons.
- Roy Horniman (1928), The Viper, London: S. Paul & Co. Ltd.
- Roy Horniman (1929), His Private Life, etc., London: Readers Library Publishing Co.

== Notes ==
A.Multiple references regarding Roy Horniman state that he was born in either 1872 or 1874. However, Horniman was actually born on 31 July 1868. Multiple sources confirm 1868 as his year of birth, including his obituary in The Times (13 October 1930) which states he was aged 62 when he died. His birth was registered as Robert Horniman, recorded in the civil registrations in the district of Southsea, county Hampshire (indexed in the July to September 1868 quarter). Information regarding William and Sarah Horniman's family, living at Hastings in county Sussex, was collected for the 1881 Census of England and Wales (collected in April 1881). The household included Robert, recorded as a 12 year-old, along with his parents, maternal grandmother, and five siblings (aged from 18 to 6 years), plus a servant. At least one source describes Horniman's mother as "an aristocratic Greek mother" (unnamed). Horniman's mother was Sarah Esther (née Foster), born in about 1841 on the Greek island of Corfu in the Ionian Sea. She married the Royal Navy officer William Horniman in about 1859 at Pireaus in Greece.

B.Despite government interest and a commission of inquiry, Gattie's scheme for a more efficient goods-handling system was not adopted, which Gattie himself attributed to the vested interests of the existing transport structure. The failure of the Gattie Transport Scheme was the inspiration for George Bernard Shaw's fictional corporation 'Breakages, Limited' in his 1928 play The Apple Cart.
