= How to Make a Killing =

2026 film by John Patton Ford

- Theatrical release poster
- Directed by: John Patton Ford
- Screenplay by: John Patton Ford
- Based on: Israel Rank: The Autobiography of a Criminal by Roy Horniman; Kind Hearts and Coronets by Robert Hamer and John Dighton
- Produced by: Graham Broadbent; Pete Czernin
- Starring: Glen Powell; Margaret Qualley; Jessica Henwick; Bill Camp; Zach Woods; Topher Grace; Ed Harris
- Cinematography: Todd Banhazl
- Edited by: Harrison Atkins
- Music by: Emile Mosseri
- Production company: Blueprint Pictures
- Distributed by: A24 (United States); StudioCanal (United Kingdom and France)
- Release dates: 20 February 2026 (United States); 11 March 2026 (United Kingdom); 25 March 2026 (France)
- Running time: 105 minutes
- Countries: France; United Kingdom
- Language: English
- Budget: $15 million
- Box office: $21.6 million

How to Make a Killing is a 2026 black comedy thriller film written and directed by John Patton Ford, inspired by the 1949 British film Kind Hearts and Coronets by Robert Hamer and John Dighton. Glen Powell stars along with Margaret Qualley, Jessica Henwick, Bill Camp, Zach Woods, Topher Grace, and Ed Harris in the supporting cast.

How to Make a Killing was released in the United States by A24 on 20 February 2026, and was released in the United Kingdom by StudioCanal on 11 March 2026, and in France on 25 March 2026. The film received mixed reviews from critics and grossed $21.6 million against a production budget of $15 million.

== Plot ==
On death row for murder, with only hours to go before his execution, Becket Redfellow speaks with a priest about how he ended up in prison.

Becket is raised by his single mother, Mary, who was disowned from the wealthy Redfellow family for choosing to keep her teenage pregnancy. He befriends the affluent Julia Steinway. Prior to her death, Mary stresses to a young Becket that he should fight for the life he "deserves" to have.

Years later, an adult Becket works as a salesman at a suit store in Manhattan, where he reconnects with Julia, who is about to get married. Due to a loophole in the will, he is still last in line for the $28 billion Redfellow family fortune. Taken aback, he learns that his position at the luxury store has been given to the owner's son, a school dropout, demoting Becket to a warehouse job in New Jersey. Becket decides to claim his inheritance by murdering the remaining Redfellows. Becket first kills his drunk cousin Taylor on an isolated boat by tying his ankle to an anchor, which pulls him into the ocean and drowns him. He meets Taylor's father, Warren, at the funeral, who takes a liking to his long-lost nephew and offers him Taylor's job at Warren's financial investment firm.

While planning the murder of his other cousin Noah, Becket befriends Noah's girlfriend Ruth. After Becket kills Noah by staging a chemical explosion in his darkroom, two FBI agents approach Becket to discuss the two suspicious deaths, but Becket pretends to not know whether he is eligible for the inheritance. Julia appears in Becket's office, claiming her husband Lyle is broke. She asks for a loan, which he denies. Becket and Ruth begin dating and move in together.

Despite being rapidly promoted in his job and happy in his relationship with Ruth, Becket kills three more Redfellows: he poisons his cousin Steven and aunt Cassandra, and slips sedatives in his uncle MacArthur's coffee before a stunt flight, causing him to crash his plane. As he contemplates killing his uncle Warren, he realizes that he has grown to love and respect him, so he decides to abandon his killing spree and becomes engaged to Ruth instead. A few days later, Warren has a heart attack and dies, leaving only one more living Redfellow: Becket's grandfather Whitelaw, who disowned Becket's mother when she was pregnant with him. Whitelaw invites Becket to dinner at his mansion on the night of Becket and Ruth's engagement party.

Julia reveals to Becket that she has photographic evidence of his murders, which she will reveal unless he gives her money immediately—delivered to her husband Lyle. Becket begrudgingly complies, going to Lyle's office to hand-deliver a check. Becket forgoes his engagement party to go to the Redfellow mansion, where he meets Whitelaw. Whitelaw reveals that he knows Becket has played dirty to gain his success, much like he himself did in the past. He then gives Becket an heirloom trench gun used by his late grandfather back in World War I and demands that Becket kill him in order to inherit the Redfellow fortune. When Becket refuses, Whitelaw chases him around the locked-down mansion, firing several shots at him. Becket shoots Whitelaw dead with an arrow in self-defense, making Becket the sole inheritor to the fortune.

At a celebratory party at the mansion, Becket is approached again by the FBI agents, who arrest him for the murder of Julia's husband Lyle. Lyle was found stabbed to death in his office using a letter opener that Becket touched when he delivered the money, leaving fingerprint evidence. Twenty-four hours before he is set to be executed, Julia visits Becket in prison. During the meeting, she hints that there was a suicide note written by Lyle that was withheld from the trial. Becket urges Julia to release the note, which she agrees to only if Becket signs over the entire Redfellow fortune to her. Becket reluctantly agrees.

In the present, the priest leaves. Julia releases the note as promised. With Becket's innocence proven, he is set free. Ruth waits for him outside the prison, only to return his mother's locket to him and leave afterwards without saying a word. Becket sees Julia waiting for him with the Redfellow family driver, and the two drive to the Redfellow family mansion together.

== Cast ==
- Glen Powell as Becket Redfellow
  - Grady Wilson as young Becket
- Margaret Qualley as Julia Steinway, Becket's childhood friend
  - Maggie Toomey as young Julia
- Jessica Henwick as Ruth, Noah's girlfriend
- Bill Camp as Warren Redfellow, Becket's uncle and Taylor's father
- Zach Woods as Noah Redfellow, Becket's cousin
- Topher Grace as Pastor Steven J. Redfellow, Becket's cousin
- Ed Harris as Whitelaw Redfellow, Becket's grandfather
- Raff Law as Taylor Redfellow, Becket's cousin and Warren's son
- Nell Williams as Mary Redfellow, Becket's mother
- Alexander Hanson as MacArthur Redfellow, Becket's uncle
- James Frecheville as Lyle, Julia's husband
- Adrian Lukis as Father James Morris, a prison chaplain interviewing Becket before execution
- Sean Cameron Michael as Charles, Whitelaw's butler
- Phumi Tau as Megan Pinfield, an FBI agent investigating the Redfellow murders
- Stevel Marc as Brad Matthews, an FBI agent investigating the Redfellow murders
- Bianca Amato as Cassandra Redfellow, Becket's aunt

== Production ==
Ford's screenplay originally appeared on the 2014 Black List under the title Rothchild. In 2019, Jon S. Baird signed on to direct the film, with Shia LaBeouf and Mel Gibson starring. Development of the film resumed in March 2023, with plans for Ford to direct the film himself. The film, retitled Huntington, was reportedly inspired by the 1949 film Kind Hearts and Coronets by Robert Hamer and John Dighton.

In January 2024, Glen Powell was cast in the lead role, and Margaret Qualley and Ed Harris joined in May 2024. Jessica Henwick, Topher Grace, Zach Woods, Raff Law and Bill Camp joined the cast in June 2024, with principal photography commencing. The film was shot in Cape Town, employing hundreds of local South African cast, crew, and extras. In November 2025, Powell told The Hollywood Reporter that the film would be getting a new title, which was revealed a week later as How to Make a Killing.

According to Ford, editing the film took 308 days and required drastic reshaping.

== Release ==
How to Make a Killing was released in the United States by A24 on 20 February 2026, and was released in the United Kingdom by StudioCanal on 11 March 2026. The film was released in France on 25 March 2026.

== Reception ==
On the review aggregator website Rotten Tomatoes, 45% of 196 critics' reviews are positive, with an average rating of 5.6/10. The website's consensus reads: "Deploying Glen Powell's magnetic likability to head-scratching ends, this tonally bizarre comedic thriller wants to eat its rich and have it, too." Metacritic, which uses a weighted average, assigned the film a score of 49 out of 100, based on 41 critics, indicating "mixed or average" reviews.

Benjamin Lee of The Guardian called the film "stylishly made", but ultimately "a real mess". Owen Gleiberman of Variety said Glen Powell is "sleek enough to cruise through a movie like... well, Tom Cruise" and that "he carries the audience with his energized sense of play". Ross Bonaime of Collider gave the film a more positive grade of 6 out of 10, adding that "while Ford's film is a good bit of fun, mixing together Scott Pilgrim vs. the World and No Other Choice (although not nearly as good at either), How to Make a Killing is more interested in its 'eat the rich' concept rather than making a solid thriller".
