= Wild Horse Nine =

2026 film by Martin McDonagh

- Theatrical release poster
- Directed by: Martin McDonagh
- Written by: Martin McDonagh
- Produced by: Graham Broadbent; Pete Czernin; Martin McDonagh; Anita Overland
- Starring: John Malkovich; Sam Rockwell; Steve Buscemi; Tom Waits; Parker Posey
- Cinematography: Ben Davis
- Edited by: Mikkel E. G. Nielsen
- Music by: Carter Burwell
- Production companies: Blueprint Pictures; Film4; TSG Entertainment
- Distributed by: Searchlight Pictures
- Release dates: 3 September 2026 (Venice); 6 November 2026 (United Kingdom and United States)
- Running time: 117 minutes
- Countries: United Kingdom; United States; Chile
- Language: English
- Budget: $13–15 million
- Box office: $39 million

Wild Horse Nine is a 2026 black comedy film written and directed by Martin McDonagh. A co-production of the United Kingdom, United States, and Chile, it stars John Malkovich, Sam Rockwell, Steve Buscemi, Mariana di Girolamo, Ailín Salas, Tom Waits, and Parker Posey. The film follows two CIA officers in 1973 who travel to Easter Island for an assignment and wrestle with their dark pasts.

Wild Horse Nine premiered in the main competition of the 83rd Venice International Film Festival on 3 September 2026, where Malkovich won the Volpi Cup for Best Actor. It was widely released by Searchlight Pictures on November 6. The film received positive reviews from critics.

== Plot ==
In 1973, CIA officers Chris Carlisle and Lee Chesterfield vacation to Easter Island from their station in Santiago, Chile. At the airport, they encounter Monica and Alicia, two young left-wing students. Chris jokes to them that they are CIA agents there to destabilize their government, which is quickly brushed aside by Lee.

During their trip, Chris's crude behavior and morphine addiction is of constant annoyance to Lee, though it is mostly tolerated. Chris is aging and has begun recording a memoir on his voice recorder of his various involvements during his career (including the Guatemalan coup d'etat, the Bay of Pigs invasion, the assassination of Patrice Lumumba and the Kennedy assassination, among others). However, this is opposed by bureau chief MJ, who, it is later revealed, has instructed Lee to kill Chris lest he reveal confidential information.

The pair travel to various destinations on the island. It is revealed that Chris has dementia and terminal cancer with a week to live; he has asked Lee to kill him at the end of their trip, though he himself no longer remembers this fact. Chris believes that they are being followed and becomes increasingly paranoid and volatile. When Lee tries to confirm their plans with Chris, a confused Chris responds that he would rather visit Venice and insists that Lee books a new itinerary. A frustrated Lee relents.

Meanwhile, MJ pressures Lee, who is torn between his duty and his loyalty to Chris, to tie up loose ends. He needs Lee to locate a rifle which was used to assassinate Kennedy. Lee finds their hotel receptionist rummaging through Chris's belongings and discovers that she is acting on instructions from MJ. MJ coerces Lee by kidnapping his wife and children, and decides to travel to Easter Island himself.

Chris meets Monica again and apologizes for his earlier remarks. In the evening, while attending a Victor Jara concert, he informs her that Chilean president Salvador Allende will be overthrown and activists like her and Alicia will be persecuted. He warns her to flee and advises her to never stop fighting if she is being made to get into a car, but she angrily rebuffs him. Whilst leaving, Chris realizes that Monica's car had been the one following him.

MJ arrives on the island, and Lee goes alone to meet him. He pleads with MJ to spare Chris and let them go in peace to Venice. However, MJ refuses and insists Chris is to be killed on the island. MJ, Alicia (a CIA mole who was working for MJ all along), and Lee head to find Chris, who has forced Monica at gunpoint to drive him away from the hotel. After confirming that she is not a spy, he advises her on how to possibly prevent the upcoming Chilean regime, telling her to kill any person she sees in uniform, while acknowledging that even then there will be more people; the regime is inevitable. Still, this sparks a spirit of resistance in Monica.

As Monica drives away, she is stopped by MJ. As his men drag Monica towards a car, she struggles to resist them with all her might until they are shot dead by Chris with the rifle used to kill Kennedy. She escapes after running over Alicia. MJ orders Lee to kill Chris, but Lee, disillusioned, shoots MJ instead. Lee and Chris share one final conversation, during which Chris gives Lee a film reel of the Kennedy assassination to be used as leverage to save Lee's family. Chris finally gives Lee the code word to kill him, which he does. In his final voice recording, Chris briefly reflects that he "could have killed a lot less people" and "should've hung out with a lot more horses".

== Cast ==
- John Malkovich as Chris Carlisle, a veteran CIA officer with terminal cancer and Lee's mentor
- Sam Rockwell as Lee Chesterfield, a CIA officer and Chris's protégé
- Steve Buscemi as MJ, a CIA bureau chief stationed in Chile and Chris and Lee's boss
- Mariana di Girolamo as Monica, a Chilean college student Chris befriends and Alicia's friend
- Ailín Salas as Alicia, Monica's travel companion
- Tom Waits as Jim Carlisle, Chris's brother
- Parker Posey as Marge Chesterfield, Lee's wife
- Paola Giannini as Rosa, hotel receptionist

== Production ==
McDonagh has said that he first learned about the 1973 Chilean coup, and the torture and murder of detainees at Estadio Chile – events referenced throughout the film – in The Clash’s song "Washington Bullets", from their 1980 album Sandinista!.

In February 2025, it was reported that a film written and directed by Martin McDonagh was in development for Searchlight Pictures with Blueprint Pictures and Film4 co-producing and Taylor Friedman and Peter Spencer overseeing the project. It would be produced by Graham Broadbent, Pete Czernin, and Anita Overland. The film was set to star Sam Rockwell, John Malkovich, and Mark Ruffalo. The same month, Parker Posey joined the cast. In March 2025, Steve Buscemi joined the cast, replacing Ruffalo after he left the project. Mariana di Girolamo, Tom Waits, Ailín Salas, and Paola Giannini are also part of the cast. Ben Davis was announced as the film's cinematographer.

Principal photography began that month, on Rapa Nui, and then, in April, continued at a rayuela club in Conchalí, the Arturo Merino Benítez International Airport, and the center of Santiago city. Filming wrapped on 28 April.

== Release ==
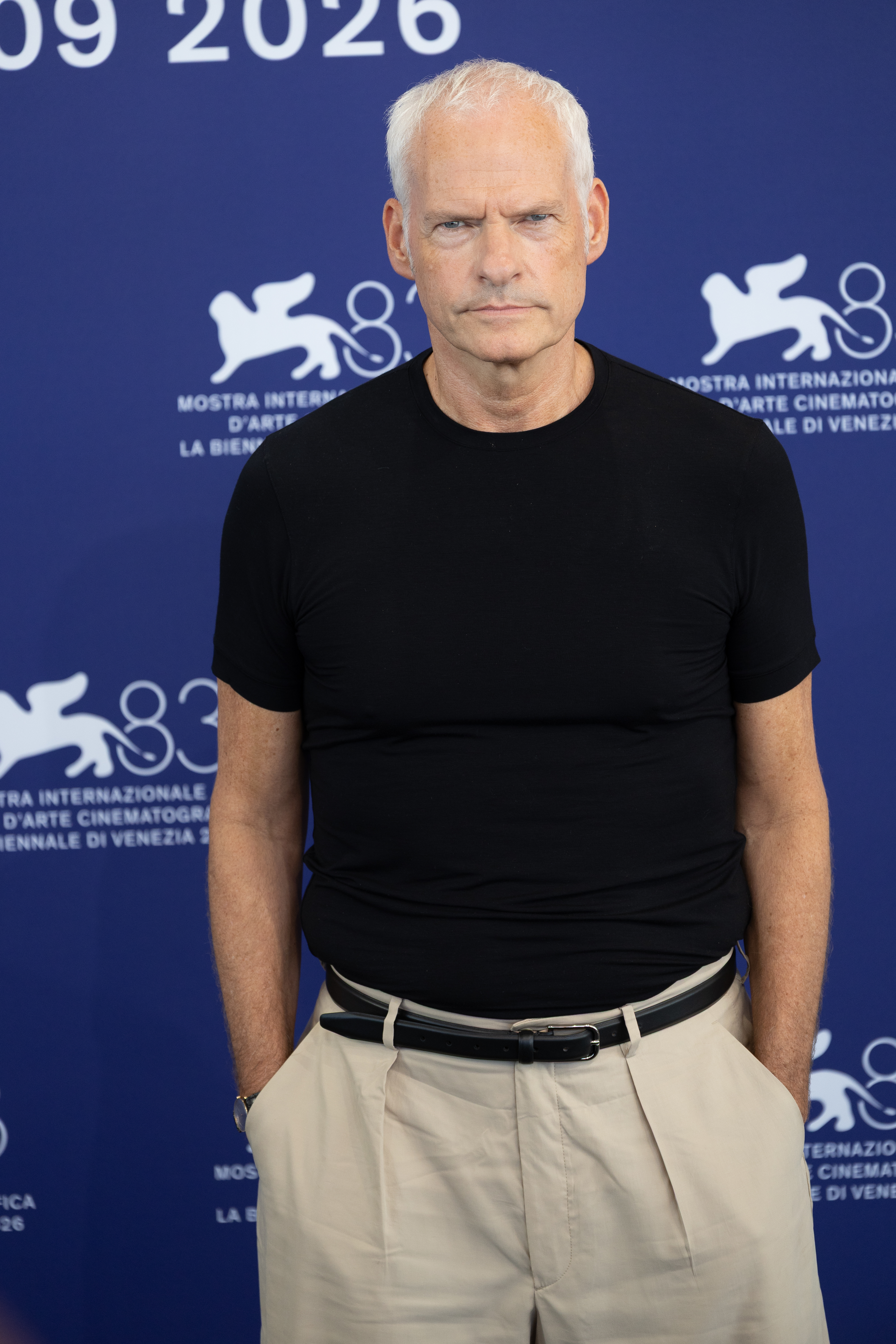
McDonagh at the 83rd Venice International Film Festival

The film had its world premiere in the main competition of the 83rd Venice International Film Festival on 3 September 2026. It had its North American premiere at the 53rd Telluride Film Festival. It was also programmed in the 'Perlak' sidebar section of the 74th San Sebastián International Film Festival. It screened in the Gala section of 39th Tokyo International Film Festival on 2 November 2026. It also screened at the 15th Montclair Film Festival as the opening night film on October 16th. It opened the 2026 Stockholm International Film Festival on November 11, 2026.

It was released theatrically on 6 November 2026 by Searchlight Pictures.

== Reception ==
=== Box office ===
Wild Horse Nine has grossed $31 million worldwide. It has grossed $16 million in North America.

=== Critical response ===
On the review aggregator website Rotten Tomatoes, 93% of 270 critics' reviews are positive, with an average rating of 8.2/10. The website's consensus reads: "John Malkovich is at his cantankerous best in Wild Horse Nine, an uproariously funny espionage comedy with crackling dialogue and biting political commentary that practically bleeds from writer-director Martin McDonagh's pen." Metacritic, which uses a weighted average, assigned the film a score of 77 out of 100, based on 52 critics, indicating "generally favorable" reviews. Audiences surveyed by PostTrak gave the film an average of 5 out of 5 stars, with 72% saying they would definitely recommend it.

David Ehrlich of IndieWire gave the film a 'B-' score, calling it "prickly but unconvincing". Guy Lodge of Variety wrote that it had been a long time since Malkovich was "this engaged and affecting, in a part this perfectly tailored to his weary, wary onscreen demeanor". Peter Bradshaw of The Guardian gave the film 3 out of 5 stars, lamenting that, as in Seven Psychopaths, Americanness can bring "more violence, more strenuous sweary machismo, less comedy, less charm" to the film. Nikki Baughan of ScreenDaily deemed the film a "solid all-rounder", highlighting the "electric performances from John Malkovich and Sam Rockwell". David Rooney of The Hollywood Reporter called Malkovich's performance "the real revelation", "building infinite layers into a plum role that is his best in years, ranking with his finest work". Matt Zoller Seitz of RogerEbert.com gave the film three and a half out of four stars, praising the "stuttering, jabbing, weaving rhythm" of the screenplay, and the performances as "some of the best acting ever done by Malkovich, Rockwell and Buscemi".

=== Accolades ===
Award	Date of ceremony	Category	Recipient(s)	Result	Ref.
Venice Film Festival	12 September 2026	Golden Lion	Martin McDonagh	Nominated	
Venice Film Festival	12 September 2026	Volpi Cup for Best Actor	John Malkovich	Won	
Venice Film Festival	12 September 2026	Fanheart3 Award - Silver Ship for Best OTP (One True Pairing)	Chris and Lee	Won	
Camerimage	14 November 2026	Audience Award	Ben Davis	Won	
Hollywood Music in Media Awards	18 November 2026	Best Original Score – Feature Film	Carter Burwell	Nominated	
Gotham Independent Film Awards	30 November 2026	Outstanding Lead Performance	John Malkovich	Pending	
Gotham Independent Film Awards	30 November 2026	Best Original Screenplay	Martin McDonagh	Pending	
