= Blueprint Pictures =

Film production company

Blueprint Pictures Limited
- Formerly: Carevalley Limited (February–July 2004)
- Industry: Motion pictures
- Founded: 2005; 21 years ago (London, England)
- Founder: Graham Broadbent; Peter Czernin
- Headquarters: London, England, UK
- Products: Feature films Television programs
- Divisions: Blueprint Television
- Website: blueprintpictures.com

Blueprint Pictures Limited is an indie film and television production company founded in 2005 by producers Graham Broadbent and Peter Czernin. Sony Pictures Television has owned a small stake in Blueprint Television since 2016.

In 2008, Blueprint Pictures produced Martin McDonagh’s film In Bruges, starring Colin Farrell and Brendan Gleeson, in conjunction with Film4. Blueprint also produced McDonagh's second feature Seven Psychopaths, starring Colin Farrell, Woody Harrelson, and Sam Rockwell.

In 2017, Blueprint produced Martin McDonagh's Three Billboards Outside Ebbing, Missouri with Film4, starring Frances McDormand, Woody Harrelson, Sam Rockwell, and Peter Dinklage. The film was nominated for seven Academy Awards, won two, and won 5 BAFTAs as well as 4 Golden Globes.

2018 saw the release of Mike Newell’s The Guernsey Literary and Potato Peel Pie Society starring Lily James and Michiel Huisman, and the BBC television show A Very English Scandal, starring Hugh Grant and Ben Whishaw and directed by Stephen Frears.

Other Blueprint productions include The Best Exotic Marigold Hotel and its sequel The Second Best Exotic Marigold Hotel starring Judi Dench and Bill Nighy, The Riot Club starring Sam Claflin, Max Irons, and Douglas Booth and directed by Lone Scherfig, and Becoming Jane starring Anne Hathaway and James McAvoy. Blueprint's first television drama, The Outcast, was shown on BBC1 in 2015.

== Filmography ==
=== Film ===
| Year | Film title | Director | Distributor | Co-production with |
|---|---|---|---|---|
| 2007 | Wind Chill | Gregory Jacobs | Sony Pictures Releasing | TriStar Pictures and Section Eight Productions |
| 2007 | Becoming Jane | Julian Jarrold | Buena Vista International | Miramax Films, BBC Films, HanWay Films, UK Film Council, Irish Film Board, Ecosse Films, 2 Entertain and Scion Pictures |
| 2008 | In Bruges | Martin McDonagh | Universal Pictures; Focus Features (United States) | Film4 and Scion Films |
| 2011 | The Best Exotic Marigold Hotel | John Madden | Fox Searchlight Pictures | Participant Media and Image Nation Abu Dhabi |
| 2012 | Seven Psychopaths | Martin McDonagh | CBS Films; Momentum Pictures | Film4, BFI and HanWay Films |
| 2012 | Now Is Good | Ol Parker | Warner Bros. Pictures; StudioCanal (France) | BBC Films, BFI, TF1 Droits Audiovisuel, Lipsync Productions and Rising Sun Film |
| 2014 | The Riot Club | Lone Scherfig | Universal Pictures; IFC Films | Film4, BFI and Pinewood Films |
| 2015 | The Second Best Exotic Marigold Hotel | John Madden | Fox Searchlight Pictures | Participant Media and Image Nation Abu Dhabi |
| 2017 | Three Billboards Outside Ebbing, Missouri | Martin McDonagh | Fox Searchlight Pictures | Fim4 |
| 2017 | The Mercy | James Marsh | StudioCanal | BBC Films and Galatée Films |
| 2018 | The Guernsey Literary and Potato Peel Pie Society | Mike Newell | StudioCanal | Mazur/Kaplan Company and Miracle Pictures |
| 2020 | Emma. | Autumn de Wilde | Focus Features | Working Title Films and Perfect World Pictures |
| 2021 | The Last Letter from Your Lover | Augustine Frizzell | StudioCanal; Netflix | The Film Farm |
| 2021 | A Boy Called Christmas | Gil Kenan | StudioCanal; Netflix | |
| 2022 | The Banshees of Inisherin | Martin McDonagh | Searchlight Pictures | Film4 |
| 2022 | Lady Chatterley's Lover | Laure de Clermont | Netflix | 3000 Pictures, Laurence Mark Productions and HarperCollins |
| 2023 | All of Us Strangers | Andrew Haigh | Searchlight Pictures | Film4 |
| 2023 | Wicked Little Letters | Thea Sharrock | Sony Pictures Classics | StudioCanal, Film4, South of the River Pictures, and People Person Pictures |
| 2024 | The Beautiful Game | Thea Sharrock | Netflix | Film4 |
| 2026 | How to Make a Killing | John Patton Ford | A24 | StudioCanal |
| 2026 | Wild Horse Nine | Martin McDonagh | Searchlight Pictures | Film4 |
| 2027 | Jack of Spades | Joel Coen | Netflix | Indian Paintbrush |

=== Television ===
| Year | Series title | Director | Broadcaster | Co-production with |
|---|---|---|---|---|
| 2015 | The Outcast | Iain Softley | BBC One | |
| 2016 | The Last Dragonslayer (TV film) | Jamie Magnus Stone | Sky One | GroupM Entertainment |
| 2018 | A Very English Scandal | Stephen Frears | BBC One | Sony Pictures Television |
| 2021 | A Very British Scandal | Anne Sewitsky | BBC One; Amazon Prime Video | Sony Pictures Television and Amazon Studios |
| 2024 | A Very Royal Scandal | Julian Jarrold | Amazon Prime Video | Sony Pictures Television and Amazon MGM Studios |
