= Kind Hearts and Coronets =

1949 British film directed by Robert Hamer

- Original British film poster by James Fitton
- Directed by: Robert Hamer
- Screenplay by: Robert Hamer; John Dighton
- Based on: Israel Rank: The Autobiography of a Criminal by Roy Horniman
- Produced by: Michael Balcon; Michael Relph
- Starring: Valerie Hobson; Dennis Price; Joan Greenwood; Alec Guinness
- Cinematography: Douglas Slocombe
- Edited by: Peter Tanner
- Music by: Ernest Irving
- Production company: Ealing Studios
- Distributed by: General Film Distributors
- Release date: 14 June 1949
- Running time: 106 minutes
- Country: United Kingdom
- Language: English
- Box office: £224,853

Kind Hearts and Coronets is a 1949 British crime black comedy film directed by Robert Hamer. It features Dennis Price, Joan Greenwood, Valerie Hobson and Alec Guinness; Guinness plays eight characters. The plot is loosely based on the novel Israel Rank: The Autobiography of a Criminal (1907) by Roy Horniman. It concerns Louis D'Ascoyne Mazzini, the son of a woman disowned by her aristocratic family for marrying out of her social class. After her death, a vengeful Louis decides to take the family's dukedom by murdering the eight people ahead of him in the line of succession to the title.

Michael Balcon, the head of Ealing Studios and the producer of Kind Hearts and Coronets, appointed Hamer as director. Filming took place from September 1948 at Leeds Castle and other locations in Kent, and at Ealing Studios. Themes of class and sexual repression run through the film, particularly love between classes.

Kind Hearts and Coronets was released on 14 June 1949 in the United Kingdom, and was well received by critics. It has continued to receive favourable reviews over the years and, in 1999, it was number six in the British Film Institute's ranking of the Top 100 British films. In 2005, it was included in Time's list of the top 100 films since 1923.

== Plot ==
In Edwardian England, Louis D'Ascoyne Mazzini, 10th Duke of Chalfont, is in prison awaiting his hanging for murder, to be carried out the following morning. He writes an account of the events that led him to this point which forms the basis for the narration of the film told in flashback.

His mother, the youngest daughter of the 7th Duke of Chalfont, eloped with an Italian opera singer named Mazzini and was disowned by her family for marrying beneath her station. The Mazzinis were poor, but happy until Mazzini died shortly after Louis was born. Louis's mother brings him up among stories of the history of her family and tells him how, unlike most other peerages, the dukedom of Chalfont can descend through female as well as male heirs. Louis's only childhood friends are Sibella Hallward and her brother, the children of a local doctor.

When Louis leaves school, his mother writes to her kinsman, Lord Ascoyne D'Ascoyne, head of a private bank, for assistance in launching her son's career, but is rebuffed. Louis is forced to work as an assistant to a draper. When his mother dies, her last request to be interred in the family burial vault at Chalfont Castle, is denied. Louis proposes marriage to Sibella, but she ridicules him, and marries Lionel Holland, a former school friend of her brother who has a rich father. Soon after this, Louis quarrels with a customer, Ascoyne D'Ascoyne, the banker's arrogant only child, who has him dismissed from his job.

Louis resolves to kill Ascoyne D'Ascoyne and the other seven family members ahead of him in the order of succession to the dukedom. After arranging a fatal boating accident for Ascoyne D'Ascoyne and his mistress, Louis writes a letter of condolence to his victim's father, Lord Ascoyne D'Ascoyne, who employs him as a clerk. Upon his later promotion, Louis takes a bachelor flat in St James's, London, for assignations with Sibella, who is unhappy in her marriage to the dull Lionel.

Louis next targets Henry D'Ascoyne, a keen amateur photographer. He meets Henry and is charmed by his wife, Edith. He substitutes petrol for paraffin in the lamp in Henry's darkroom, with fatal results. Louis decides that Edith is fit to be his duchess. The Reverend Lord Henry D'Ascoyne is the next victim and Louis, posing as the Bishop of Matabeleland, poisons Lord Henry's after-dinner port. From the window of his flat, Louis then uses a bow and arrow to shoot down the balloon from which the suffragette Lady Agatha D'Ascoyne is dropping leaflets over London. Admiral Lord Horatio D'Ascoyne presents a challenge, as he rarely sets foot on land. However, by chance he conveniently insists on going down with his ship after causing a collision at sea. Louis next sends General Lord Rufus D'Ascoyne a jar of caviar which contains a bomb.

When Edith agrees to marry Louis, they notify Ethelred, the childless, widowed eighth duke. He invites them to spend a few days at Chalfont Castle. When Ethelred casually informs Louis that he intends to remarry in order to produce an heir, Louis arranges a "accident" with a shotgun. Before shooting the duke, he reveals his motive. Lord Ascoyne D'Ascoyne dies from the shock of learning that he has become the ninth duke, sparing Louis from having to murder his kindly employer. Louis inherits the dukedom, but his triumph proves short-lived.

Sibella's husband, Lionel, had made a drunken plea to Louis for financial help to avoid bankruptcy, but Louis had turned him down. Lionel is later found dead and a Scotland Yard detective arrests Louis on suspicion of murder. Louis elects to be tried by his peers in the House of Lords. (Note: At the time of the film's release, this privilege had just been abolished by the Criminal Justice Act 1948, after it had been claimed in 1935 by Lord de Clifford.) During the trial, Louis and Edith are married. Sibella falsely testifies both that Lionel was about to seek a divorce and name Louis as co-respondent and that no suicide note was found. Ironically, Louis is convicted of a murder he had never even contemplated.

While in prison awaiting his hanging, Louis is visited by Sibella, who observes that the belated "discovery" of Lionel's suicide note together with Louis's promise to dispose of Edith would free Louis and enable them to marry, a proposal to which, facing the gallows, he is forced to agree. Moments before his hanging, the discovery of the note secures his release. Louis finds both Edith and Sibella waiting for him outside the prison, but is undecided which to choose. When a reporter tells him that Tit-Bits magazine wishes to publish his memoirs, Louis suddenly remembers that he has left them behind in his cell (thereby providing the authorities with a complete confession to the murders).

== Cast ==
- Dennis Price as Louis Mazzini and his father
- Alec Guinness as eight members of the D'Ascoyne family:
  - Ethelred, 8th Duke of Chalfont
  - The Reverend Lord Henry
  - General Lord Rufus
  - Admiral Lord Horatio
  - Lord Ascoyne, the banker
  - Young Ascoyne, the banker's son
  - Lady Agatha, the suffragette
  - Young Henry, the photographer
- Valerie Hobson as Edith D'Ascoyne
- Joan Greenwood as Sibella Hallward
- Audrey Fildes as Mama
- Miles Malleson as the hangman
- Clive Morton as the prison governor
- John Penrose as Lionel Holland
- Cecil Ramage as the prosecution barrister
- Hugh Griffith as the Lord High Steward, who presides over Louis's trial
- John Salew as Mr Perkins
- Eric Messiter as Inspector Burgoyne of Scotland Yard
- Lyn Evans as the farmer
- Barbara Leake as the schoolmistress
- Peggy Ann Clifford as Maud Redpole
- Anne Valery as the girl in the punt
- Arthur Lowe as the Tit-Bits reporter
- Richard Wattis as the defence barrister (uncredited)
- Laurence Naismith as warder in jail (uncredited)
- Jeremy Spenser as Louis as a child (uncredited)
- Carol White as Sibella as a child (uncredited)

== Production ==
=== Pre-production ===
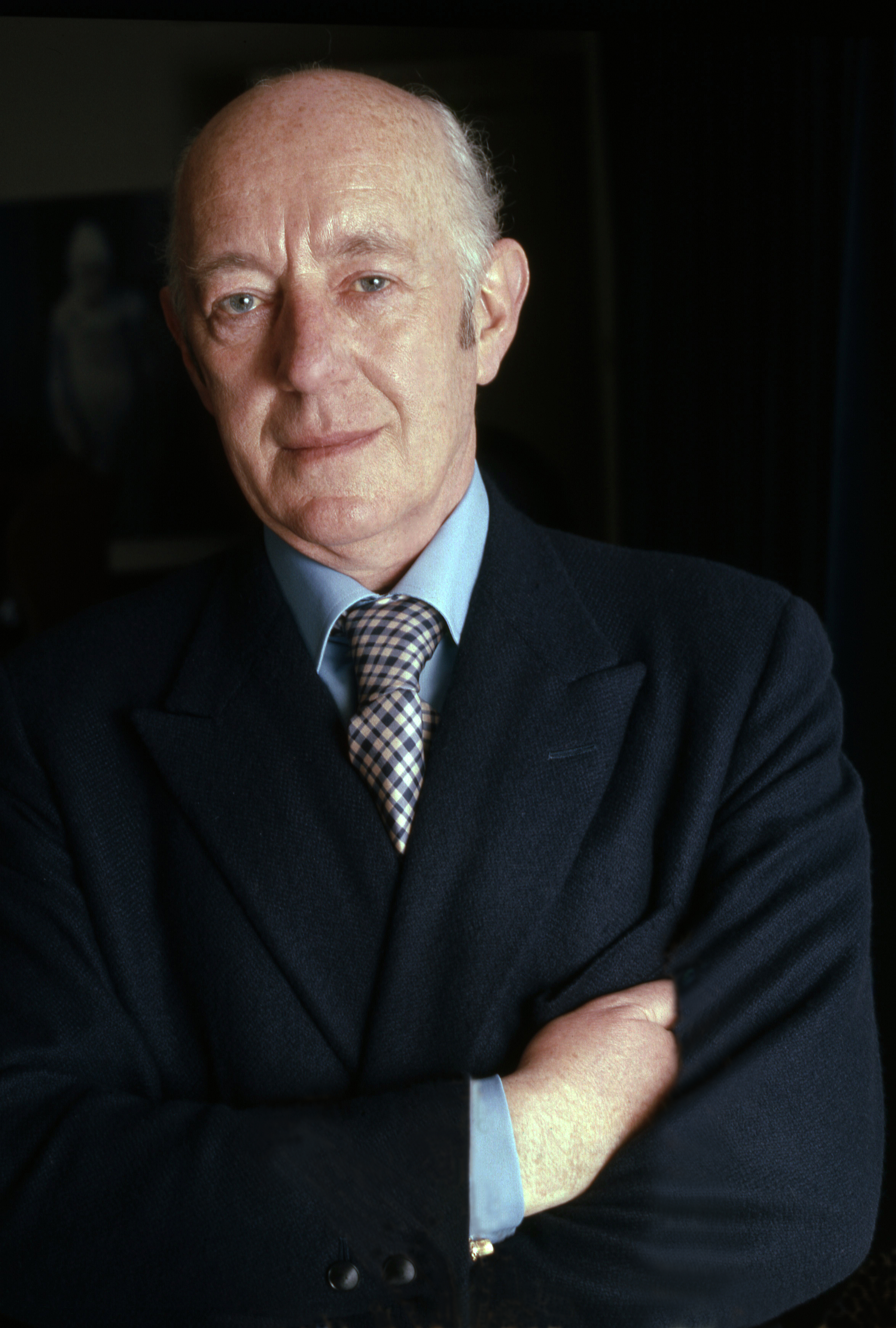
Alec Guinness in 1972

In 1947 Michael Pertwee, a scriptwriter at Ealing Studios, suggested an adaptation of a 1907 Roy Horniman novel, Israel Rank: The Autobiography of a Criminal. The writer Simon Heffer observes that the plot of the source novel was dark in places—it includes the murder of a child—and differed in several respects from the resulting film. A major difference was that the main character was the half-Jewish (as opposed to half-Italian) Israel Rank, and Heffer writes that Mazzini's "ruthless using of people (notably women) and his greedy pursuit of position all seem to conform to the stereotype that the anti-semite has of the Jew".

The change from Israel Rank to Louis Mazzini was brought about by the "post-war sensitivity about anti-Semitism", and the moral stance of the films produced by Ealing. According to the British Film Institute (BFI), the novel is "self-consciously in the tradition" of Oscar Wilde, which is reflected in the snobbery and dandyism portrayed in the film.

The head of Ealing Studios, Michael Balcon, was initially unconvinced by the idea of the film, stating that "I'm not going to make a comedy about eight murders"; the studio's creative staff persuaded him to reconsider. Balcon, who produced the film, chose Robert Hamer as director and warned him that "You are trying to sell that most unsaleable commodity to the British – irony. Good luck to you." Hamer disliked Pertwee, who withdrew from the project, leaving the scriptwriting to Hamer and John Dighton. Hamer saw the potential of the story and later wrote:

What were the possibilities which thus presented themselves? Firstly, in that of making a film not noticeably similar to any previously made in the English language. Secondly, that of using this English language ... in a more varied and, to me, more interesting way than I had previously had the chance of doing in a film. Thirdly, that of making a picture which paid no regard whatever to established, although not practised, moral convention.

The film was produced at the same time as two other Ealing comedies, Passport to Pimlico and Whisky Galore!; all three were released into British cinemas over two months. (Note: Brian McFarlane, writing for the Oxford Dictionary of National Biography, states that although it was not an aim of releasing the three films together, together they "established the brand name of 'Ealing comedy'".) The film's title was taken from the 1842 poem "Lady Clara Vere de Vere" by Alfred, Lord Tennyson. The full couplet reads

Kind hearts are more than coronets,
And simple faith than Norman blood.

Scene showing Alec Guinness in six of the roles he portrayed (second from the left is Valerie Hobson as the recently widowed Edith). The cinematographer Douglas Slocombe masked the lens and filmed over several days to achieve the shot.

Alec Guinness was originally offered only four D'Ascoyne parts, recollecting "I read [the screenplay] on a beach in France, collapsed with laughter on the first page, and didn't even bother to get to the end of the script. I went straight back to the hotel and sent a telegram saying, 'Why four parts? Why not eight!?'"

=== Filming ===
Production began on 1 September 1948. Exterior filming was undertaken in the Kent villages of Harrietsham and Boughton Monchelsea. Leeds Castle, also in Kent, was used for Chalfont, the family home of the D'Ascoynes. Additional filming was undertaken at Ealing Studios. (Note: Although there were reports that part of the film was shot at Pinewood Studios, Balcon wrote to Sight and Sound magazine to state that, with the exception of the location filming, it was shot at Ealing.)

The costumes were designed by Anthony Mendleson, who matched Louis's rise through the social ranks with his changing costumes. When employed as a shop assistant, Louis's suit was ill-fitting and drab; he is later seen in tailored suits with satin lapels, wearing a brocade dressing gown and waiting for his execution in a quilted-collar velvet jacket. Mendleson later recounted that to dress Guinness in his many roles, the costumes were of less importance than make-up and the actor's nuances.

In one shot Guinness appears as six of his characters at once in a single frame. This was accomplished by masking the lens. The film was re-exposed several times with Guinness in different positions over several days. Douglas Slocombe, the cinematographer in charge of the effect, recalled sleeping in the studio to make sure nobody touched the camera.

The death of Admiral Horatio D'Ascoyne was inspired by the collision between HMS Victoria and HMS Camperdown off Tripoli in 1893 because of an order given by Vice-Admiral Sir George Tryon. Victoria was sunk with the loss of over 350 men.

While filming the scene Hamer asked Guinness if he could hold his pose—a salute, facing the camera while the water rose around him—so that the water went over his head; Hamer wanted to show the admiral's cap floating on the surface. Guinness agreed, telling Hamer that as he practised yoga, he could hold his breath for four minutes. Guinness was attached to the deck by wires to keep him steady and the shot was taken; when Hamer called "cut", the crew began packing up and forgot to release Guinness until four minutes after the scene ended.

The music of the film, played by the Philharmonia Orchestra, is conducted by theatre and film conductor and arranger Ernest Irving who "plunders the works of W.A. Mozart to winning effect; the elegance, refinement, and inherent propriety" of the pieces used offering both a metaphor of an ordered society and a "counterpoint for murder most foul".

== Themes ==
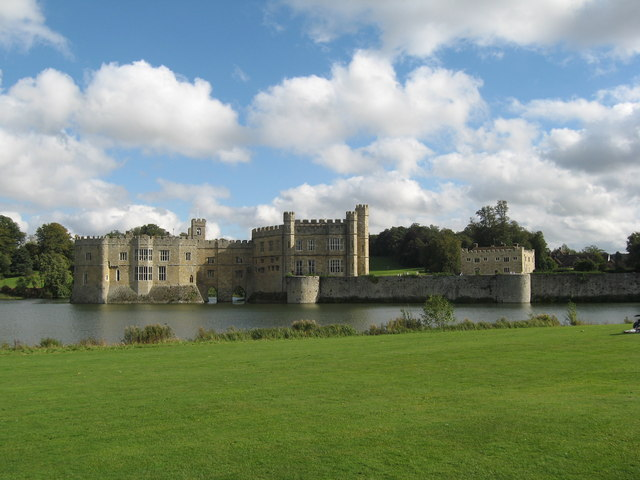
Leeds Castle, which served as the ancestral home of the D'Ascoyne family.

The British Film Institute see Kind Hearts and Coronets as "less sentimental" than many of the other Ealing films. Along with The Man in the White Suit (1951) and The Ladykillers (1955), Kind Hearts and Coronets "unleash[es] transgressive nightmares, fables of subversive, maverick masculine obsession and action, where the repressed and vengeful bubble up to the surface and lead to a resolutions which were only just contained in the moral strictures permissible in (Balcon's) Ealing cinema at the time".

The film historian Sarah Street identifies the theme of sexual repression running through the film, shown with Louis's relationship with the manipulative Sibella. The historian Ross McKibbin sees the film as a "sustained satire" in its portrayal of the upper classes, partly because of the intended absurdity of the D'Ascoyne family being portrayed by Guinness. "Lady Clara Vere de Vere", the poem from which the film's title derived, concerns class tensions surrounding love between classes.

== Release and reception ==
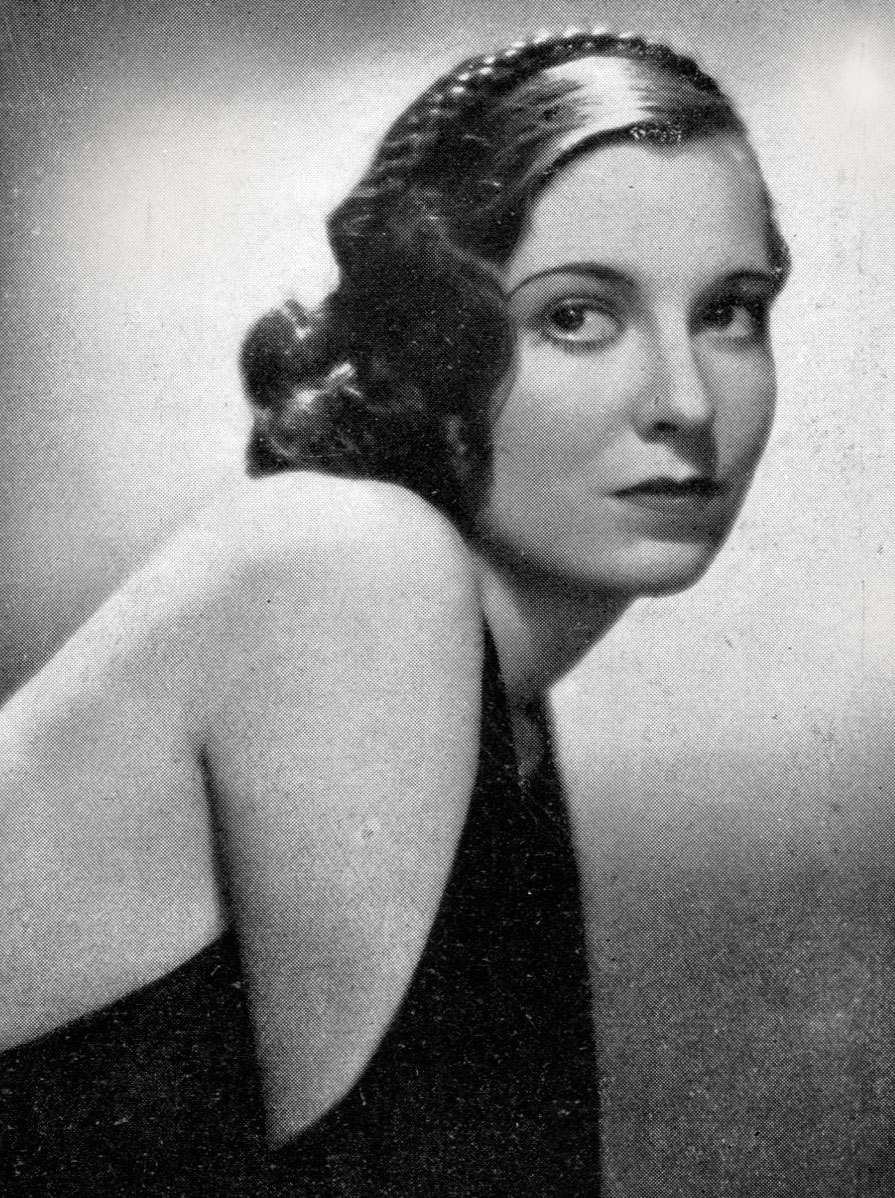
Valerie Hobson in 1934

Kind Hearts and Coronets premiered in London on 13 June 1949. In France, the film was released in 1950, selling 1,310,205 tickets. When the film was released in the US in 1950, it was edited to satisfy the Hays Code. A new ending was added, showing Louis's memoirs being discovered before he can retrieve them; the dialogue between Louis and Sibella was altered to play down their adultery; derogatory lines aimed at the Reverend Henry D'Ascoyne were deleted; and in the nursery rhyme "Eeny, meeny, miny, moe", "sailor" replaced the word "nigger". The American version is six minutes shorter than the British original.

Kind Hearts and Coronets received a warm reception from the critics. Although they thought the film slightly too long, the critic for The Manchester Guardian thought that overall it was very enjoyable "because of the light satirical touch with which mass-murder is handled, ... words are so seldom treated with any respect in the cinema". Bosley Crowther, the critic for The New York Times, called the film a "delicious little satire on Edwardian manners and morals", while the unnamed reviewer for Time called it "one of the best films of the year".

Several reviewers, including C. A. Lejeune of The Observer, praised Guinness's nine roles. The unknown reviewer from The Monthly Film Bulletin wrote that Guinness played his roles "with intelligence and restraint and show[ed] his power as a character actor", while Crowther considered that Guinness acted with "such devastating wit and variety that he naturally dominates the film". Price's performance was appreciated by a number of critics, including The Monthly Film Bulletin, who considered he gave a "brilliant performance", and Richard L. Coe, the critic for The Washington Post thought Price was "splendid"; Crowther wrote that Price was "as able as Mr. Guinness in his single but most demanding role". Lejeune in The Observer dissented, and thought he "seems pitifully outclassed every time he comes up against a Guinness" character.

Kind Hearts and Coronets was nominated for the British Academy Film Award for Best British Film, alongside Passport to Pimlico and Whisky Galore!, although they lost to The Third Man (1949). The film was screened as one of Britain's entries to the 10th Venice International Film Festival; William Kellner won an award for Best Production Design.

According to Michael Newton, writing for the BFI, Kind Hearts and Coronets has retained the high regard of film historians. In 1964 The Spectator called it "the most confident comedy ever to come out of a British studio", and the actor Peter Ustinov considered it the "most perfect achievement" of Ealing Studios, "a film of exquisite construction and literary quality". Kind Hearts and Coronets is listed in Time's top 100 and also at number six in the BFI Top 100 British films. Thirteen critics and directors voted for Kind Hearts and Coronets in the 2012 BFI poll of The Greatest Films of All Time, including Terence Davies, Peter Bradshaw and Philip French.

== Adaptations ==
The film has been adapted for radio three times. In March 1965, the BBC Home Service broadcast an adaptation by Gilbert Travers-Thomas, with Dennis Price reprising his role as Louis D'Ascoyne Mazzini. BBC Radio 4 produced a new adaptation in 1980 featuring Robert Powell as the entire D'Ascoyne clan, including Louis, and Timothy Bateson as the hangman, and another in 1996 featuring Michael Kitchen as Mazzini and Harry Enfield as the D'Ascoyne family.

In May 2012, BBC Radio 4 broadcast a sequel to the film called Kind Hearts and Coronets – Like Father, Like Daughter, written by David Spicer. In it, Unity Holland, the illegitimate daughter of Louis and Sibella, is written out of the title by Edith Duchess of Chalfont. Unity then murders the entire D'Ascoyne family, with all seven members played by Alistair McGowan.

In September 2004, it was announced that a musical adaption was to be workshopped featuring Raúl Esparza, Rebecca Luker, Nancy Anderson and Sean Allan Krill. The workshop had music and lyrics by Steven Lutvak with the book and lyrics by Robert L. Freedman. The musical was produced under the title A Gentleman's Guide to Love and Murder and opened in 2013 at the Walter Kerr Theatre on Broadway. The show has all the victims played by the same actor, in the original company Jefferson Mays. Though the plot remains essentially the same, most of the names are different: half-Italian Louis Mazzini becomes half-Castilian Montague "Monty" Navarro, the D'Ascoynes become the D'Ysquiths and Henry's wife Edith becomes Henry's sister Phoebe. The musical won four Tony Awards, including Best Musical.

In July 1975 EMI Films announced they would film a remake starring Dick Emery but this did not happen.

The movie was loosely adapted into the 2018 book How to Kill Your Family by Bella Mackie. A Netflix adaptation is in production with Anya Taylor-Joy in the lead role.

In May 2024, A24 announced they would distribute the film How to Make A Killing, whose original screenplay was heavily inspired by Kind Hearts and Coronets. Written and directed by John Patton Ford, and starring Glen Powell, Ed Harris, and Margaret Qualley, production began in June 2024 with principal photography taking place in South Africa. It was released in the USA on February 20, 2026.

== Digital restoration ==
The Criterion Collection released a two-DVD disc set. Disc one featured the standard version of the film released in the UK and, as a bonus feature, includes the final scene with the American ending. Disc two includes a 75-minutes BBC Omnibus documentary "Made in Ealing", plus a 68-minute talk-show appearance with Guinness on the BBC's Parkinson television programme. The British distributor Optimum Releasing released a digitally restored version for both DVD and Blu-ray in September 2011.

To mark the film's 70th anniversary in June 2019, a new 4k restoration scanned from the 35 mm nitrate original negative was released by Studiocanal in British cinemas, along with DVD and Blu-Ray versions. Kino Lorber released the film in the U.S. on Blu-ray in September 2019.

== See also ==
- BFI Top 100 British films
- Splitting Heirs
- How to Make a Killing

== Sources ==
- Barr, Charles (1977). Ealing Studios. Newton Abbot, Devon: David & Charles Publishers. ISBN 978-0-7153-7420-7.
- Duguid, Mark; Freeman, Lee; Johnston, Keith M.; Williams, Melanie (2012). Ealing Revisited. London: Palgrave Macmillan. ISBN 978-1-84457-510-7.
- Ellis, David A. (2012). Conversations with Cinematographers. Lanham, MD: Scarecrow Press. ISBN 978-0-8108-8126-6.
- Mackillop, Ian; Sinyard, Neil, eds. (2003). British Cinema of the 1950s: A Celebration. Manchester: Manchester University Press. ISBN 978-0-7190-6489-0. Archived from the original on 25 February 2017 – via Questia.
- McKibbin, Ross (1998). Classes and Cultures: England 1918–1951. Oxford: Oxford University Press. ISBN 978-0-19-820672-9. Archived from the original on 28 February 2017 – via Questia.
- Newton, Michael (2003). Kind Hearts and Coronets. London: British Film Institute. ISBN 978-0-85170-964-2.
- Perry, George (1981). Forever Ealing. London: Pavilion Books. ISBN 978-0-907516-60-6.
- Sellers, Robert (2015). The Secret Life of Ealing Studios. London: Aurum Press. ISBN 978-1-78131-397-8.
- Slide, Anthony (1998). Banned in the U.S.A.: British Films in the United States and Their Censorship, 1933–1966. London: I.B.Tauris. ISBN 978-1-86064-254-8.
- Street, Sarah (1997). British National Cinema. London: Routledge. ISBN 978-0-415-06735-5. Archived from the original on 28 February 2017 – via Questia.
