= Emily the Criminal =

2022 film by John Patton Ford

- Theatrical release poster
- Directed by: John Patton Ford
- Written by: John Patton Ford
- Produced by: Tyler Davidson; Aubrey Plaza; Drew Sykes
- Starring: Aubrey Plaza; Theo Rossi; Megalyn Echikunwoke; Gina Gershon
- Cinematography: Jeff Bierman
- Edited by: Harrison Atkins
- Music by: Nathan Halpern
- Production companies: Low Spark Films; Fear Knot Productions; Evil Hag Productions
- Distributed by: Roadside Attractions; Vertical Entertainment (North America); Universal Pictures (international)
- Release dates: January 24, 2022 (Sundance); August 12, 2022 (United States)
- Running time: 97 minutes
- Country: United States
- Language: English
- Budget: $1.5–2 million
- Box office: $2.2 million

Emily the Criminal is a 2022 American crime thriller film written and directed by John Patton Ford in his feature directorial debut. It stars Aubrey Plaza as the titular character, alongside Theo Rossi, Megalyn Echikunwoke, and Gina Gershon in supporting roles. The film follows Emily Benetto, a young woman saddled with student debt and locked out of the job market due to a criminal record, who gets involved in a credit card scam that pulls her into the criminal underworld of Los Angeles.

Emily the Criminal had its world premiere at the 38th Sundance Film Festival on January 24, 2022, and was released theatrically in the United States on August 12, 2022, by Roadside Attractions and Vertical Entertainment. The film received positive reviews from critics, with praise for its screenplay and Plaza's performance. It earned four nominations at the 38th Independent Spirit Awards, including Best First Feature, with Ford winning Best First Screenplay.

== Plot ==
Emily Benetto lives in Los Angeles and works as an independent contractor delivering food for a catering company. She is deeply in debt as she struggles to pay student loans. A felony conviction for aggravated assault prevents her from obtaining a well-paying job.

A co-worker connects Emily to a "dummy shopper" service that promises to make her $200 in one hour. The service is revealed to be a credit card fraud ring. Emily meets Youcef, one of its organizers, who instructs her to purchase a flat-screen TV using a fake card and ID. The next day, Emily is sent to purchase a car. However, the dealer discovers the scam, leading to a physical altercation and Emily being injured.

As Youcef tends to her wounds, they discuss their aspirations. Emily, an aspiring artist, wishes to visit South America, while Youcef plans to purchase a rental property. Emily asks for a bigger role in his operation, and Youcef teaches her how to make fake credit cards. He gives her a taser for protection and instructs her not to sell stolen goods at her home or scam the same store twice in a week. When Youcef's partner and cousin Khalil discovers them together, Youcef denies working with Emily. While Emily dogsits for her childhood friend Liz, a buyer finds her apartment and robs her earnings, taking the dog as well. She tases the buyer and reclaims both.

Emily invites Youcef to a party, which sparks a romance between them. When there is an opening at Liz's advertising agency, she gets Emily an interview with her boss Alice. However, at the interview, Emily discovers that the "job" is an unpaid internship and walks out.

At a dinner with Youcef's family, Khalil reveals that Emily has been caught hitting the same store twice within a week, prompting the store to post security footage of her online. This leads to a falling-out between Youcef and Khalil, who cuts him out of the fraud ring and refuses to pay him for his past work. Youcef decides to rob the fraud ring itself. He and Emily arrive at the ring's storage unit to find that Khalil has taken everything and emptied their shared business bank account. Emily then convinces Youcef to ambush Khalil at his safehouse.

Ambushing a guy on lookout and luring out the other ring members with a fake carjacking, they enter the safehouse, where Khalil severely injures Youcef before Emily can subdue him. Taking the ring's money and assisting Youcef to his car, she realizes they have lost his keys and cannot drive away. As police and ambulance sirens draw closer, Emily abandons Youcef in his car and flees with the money.

The police raid Emily's apartment and find it empty. Now living in South America, she returns to making art. She also establishes a credit card fraud ring of her own, recruiting dummy shoppers with the promise of making $200 in one hour.

== Cast ==
- Aubrey Plaza as Emily Benetto
- Theo Rossi as Youcef Haddad, Emily's criminal mentor who becomes her love interest
- Megalyn Echikunwoke as Liz, Emily's best friend
- Gina Gershon as Alice, Liz's boss
- Jonathan Avigdori as Khalil Haddad, Youcef's cousin
- Bernardo Badillo as Javier Santos, Emily's co-worker
- John Billingsley as office manager
- Brandon Sklenar as Brent

== Production ==
In August 2021, Aubrey Plaza, Gina Gershon, Megalyn Echikunwoke, and Theo Rossi were confirmed to star. Filming took place over the course of twenty days in Los Angeles with an additional day of shooting in Mexico. Nathan Halpern composed the musical score.

Emily the Criminal is writer and director John Patton Ford's first feature film. His thesis film at the American Film Institute, Patrol, premiered at the 2010 Sundance Film Festival and made the short list for the 84th Academy Awards. In writing Emily the Criminal, Ford drew on his own experiences with student debt and working at restaurants. After Plaza read the script, she came on board as a producer, in addition to agreeing to star in the film.

== Release ==
The film premiered at the 2022 Sundance Film Festival on January 24. In February 2022, Vertical Entertainment and Roadside Attractions acquired distribution rights for the United States and Canada, and Universal Pictures acquired international rights. It was released on August 12, 2022. Netflix began carrying the film in the United States on December 7, 2022.

The film was released on VOD platforms on September 27, 2022, followed by a Blu-ray and DVD release on November 29.

== Reception ==
=== Box office ===
Emily the Criminal grossed $2.2 million in North America, against a production budget of $2 million.

=== Critical response ===
On the review aggregator website Rotten Tomatoes, 93% of 209 critics' reviews are positive. The website's consensus reads: "A taut thriller that contains a wealth of social commentary, Emily the Criminal is stolen by Aubrey Plaza's terrific work in the title role." Metacritic, which uses a weighted average, assigned the film a score of 75 out of 100, based on 38 critics, indicating "generally favorable" reviews.

Deadline Hollywood's Damon White wrote: "[While] Ford doesn't insult us with clichés about kick-ass heroines, he does give us a deceptively rich script that explains where Emily has come to—and where she will go, ensuring a satisfying ending that, while dark, doesn't feel too sugar-coated."

Kate Erbland from IndieWire gave the film an A− and wrote of Plaza's character Emily: "Is she likable? Is she redeemable? Is she a hero? As Emily might ask, who gives a fuck? With a film and a star this in control of its pitch-black material, she's not wrong. We're just along for the ride, and wouldn't have it any other way."

Benjamin Lee of The Guardian gave the film four out of five stars and praised Ford's direction, calling it "an undeniably striking debut, slick and involving enough to have us curiously excited for whatever he decides to do next".

== TV series ==
In May 2024, it was announced that Legendary Television had acquired the rights to adapt the film into a TV series. Plaza and Ford will serve as executive producers alongside the film's producers, with the latter returning as director, although Plaza will not reprise her role.
