= The Second Best Exotic Marigold Hotel =

2015 film directed by John Madden

- UK release poster
- Directed by: John Madden
- Written by: Ol Parker
- Produced by: Graham Broadbent; Peter Czernin
- Starring: Judi Dench; Maggie Smith; Bill Nighy; Dev Patel; Celia Imrie; Penelope Wilton; Ronald Pickup; David Strathairn; Richard Gere
- Cinematography: Ben Smithard
- Edited by: Victoria Boydell
- Music by: Thomas Newman
- Production companies: Participant Media; Image Nation Abu Dhabi; Blueprint Pictures
- Distributed by: Fox Searchlight Pictures
- Release dates: 17 February 2015 (United Kingdom); 6 March 2015 (United States)
- Running time: 122 minutes
- Countries: United Kingdom; United States; United Arab Emirates
- Language: English
- Budget: $10 million
- Box office: $89.4 million

The Second Best Exotic Marigold Hotel is a 2015 comedy drama film that is the sequel to The Best Exotic Marigold Hotel. The motion picture starred ensemble cast consisting of Judi Dench, Maggie Smith, Dev Patel, Bill Nighy, Celia Imrie, Penelope Wilton, Ronald Pickup, David Strathairn, and Richard Gere. The film was directed by John Madden and written by Ol Parker.

== Plot ==
Muriel Donnelly and Sonny Kapoor travel to San Diego, California to propose a plan to hotel magnate Ty Burley for buying and opening a second hotel in India as a companion to the Best Exotic Marigold Hotel. They are told that a company inspector will anonymously visit India to evaluate the project.

Back in Jaipur, Evelyn Greenslade is offered a job as a fabric buyer. She is concerned that at age 79, the job will require many responsibilities and considerable travel. Douglas Ainslie, who is in love with Evelyn, is worried about losing time with her as well, and also eager to introduce her to his daughter.

Sonny's life becomes complicated by plans for his upcoming wedding to Sunaina, plus a possible rival for her affections and his business interests. He is also desperate to impress American visitor Guy Chambers, whom he immediately identifies as the American hotel chain's anonymous inspector. Noting the interest Guy has taken in Sonny's mother, he encourages a romantic relationship between them at first, then angrily resents it when he concludes Guy is not the inspector after all.

Madge Hardcastle's dilemma is deciding between two suitors from India and which to wed. Norman Cousins becomes frantic when he believes a local taxi driver mistakenly assumed Norman wanted a fatal accident to befall his current sweetheart, Carol, but then discovers that she has been sleeping with other men. And Douglas' daughter arrives for a visit together with his estranged wife Jean (who returned to the UK at the end of the previous film) seeking a divorce so that she can remarry.

Muriel, while having received bad news from a medical appointment, struggles to keep Sonny from ruining his wedding, his business and his future, having become quite fond of him. Decisions come to a head for all during the colourful wedding of Sonny and Sunaina.

== Cast ==
- Dev Patel as Sonny Kapoor
- Judi Dench as Evelyn Greenslade
- Maggie Smith as Muriel Donnelly
- Bill Nighy as Douglas Ainslie
- Celia Imrie as Madge Hardcastle
- Tina Desai as Sunaina
- Penelope Wilton as Jean Ainslie
- Ronald Pickup as Norman Cousins
- Diana Hardcastle as Carol Parr
- Claire Price as Laura Ainslie
- Lillete Dubey as Mrs. Kapoor
- Richard Gere as Guy Chambers
- David Strathairn as Ty Burley
- Tamsin Greig as Lavinia Beech/Theresa
- Shazad Latif as Kushal
- Rajesh Tailang as Babul
- Denzil Smith as Mr Dhurana, the Viceroy Club Secretary
- Sid Makkar as Jay
- Tom Wilkinson as Graham

== Production ==
The director and writer of the first film, John Madden and Ol Parker, returned for the sequel. In October 2012, Parker was consulted to deliver a treatment to Fox Searchlight Pictures executives for a sequel titled The Best Exotic Marigold Hotel 2. Most of the cast agreed to come back. On 28 October 2013, Radio Times revealed that the cast would be flying to India to shoot the sequel film in January 2014.

On 28 October 2013 Radio Times stated that Penelope Wilton confirmed the cast, including Judi Dench, Bill Nighy, Maggie Smith, Ronald Pickup and Celia Imrie, would return for the sequel, set to start filming in January 2014. On 30 October, Deadline reported that Richard Gere was in talks to join the ensemble cast of the sequel. Later on 10 January 2014, Gere confirmed his new role in the film; other newcomers added to the film include Tamsin Greig and David Strathairn.

Principal photography began on 10 January 2014 in Jaipur, India. The film was produced for under $10 million.

== Release ==
The Second Best Exotic Marigold Hotel had its world premiere at the Royal Film Performance on Tuesday 17 February 2015, an event held in aid of the Film & TV Charity. Subsequently, the film was released in the United Kingdom, Australia, New Zealand and Ireland on 26 February 2015, and in the United States on 6 March 2015. It grossed $33.1 million in the United States and Canada and $52.9 million in other territories for a total gross of $86 million. Opening-weekend audiences in the US polled by CinemaScore gave the film a grade of "B+" on an A+ to F scale.

The film topped the UK box office during its first week, earning £3.8 million. It stayed top of the UK box office chart for a second week, grossing over £1.9 million and held on to the top spot for the third week in a row, fended off competition from latest Liam Neeson actioner, Run All Night, and claimed £1.4 million in total. In the United States, it opened strong at number three at the US box office with an estimated $8.6 million in its first weekend of release. During its opening weekend, the film also scored the highest average gross of any film in wide release, averaging $5,467 from 1,573 theaters.

== Critical reception ==
The review aggregator Metacritic gave the film a weighted average score of 51 out of 100, indicating "mixed or average reviews", based on 36 reviews, of which it classified 18 as mixed, 16 as positive, and 2 as negative. Rotten Tomatoes, categorizing reviews as positive or negative, assessed 183 reviews and categorized 122 as positive and 61 as negative for a score of 67%. Of the subset of reviews that had scores, the average rating was 6.1 out of 10. Rotten Tomatoes summarized the critics' consensus, "The Second Best Exotic Marigold Hotel is about as original as its title—but with a cast this talented and effortlessly charming, that hardly matters."

Peter Debruge of Variety wrote: "It's not so common to find an ensemble of this caliber so enthusiastic to work together, and that chemistry comes across." Leslie Felper of The Hollywood Reporter called it "sluggish compared to its predecessor".

== See also ==
- List of British films of 2015
