= Graham Broadbent =

British film and television producer

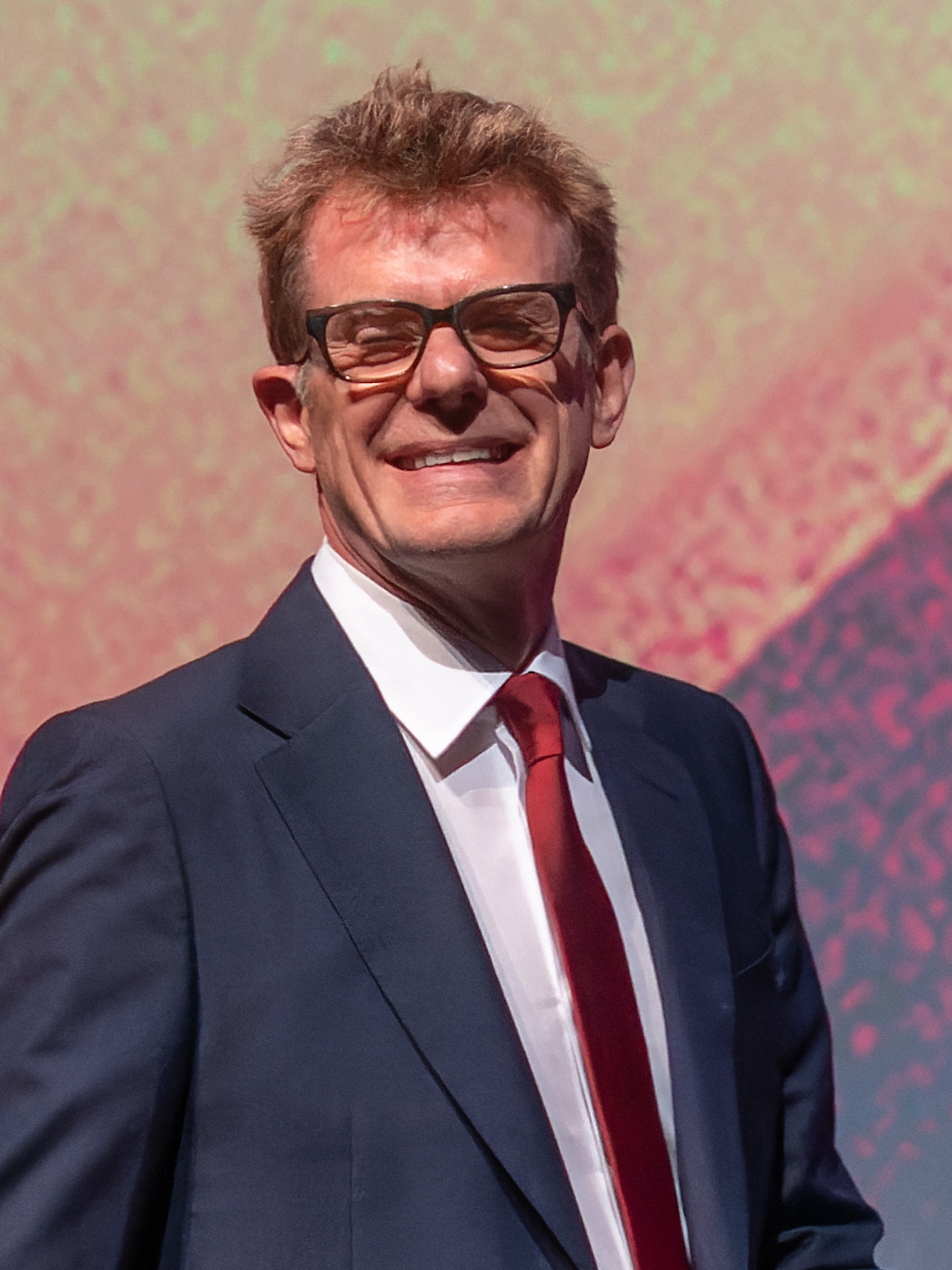
- Broadbent in 2022
- Born: Graham Neil Broadbent; England
- Occupations: Film and television producer
- Years active: 1997–present

Graham Neil Broadbent is a British film and television producer.

== Career ==
Broadbent co-founded Mission Pictures with Andrew Hauptman and Damian Jones.

Broadbent produced Welcome to Sarajevo (1996) by Michael Winterbottom, which was shown in the Festival de Cannes 1997 and cited by Time magazine as one of the ten best films of the year.

In 2004 Broadbent, with Peter Czernin, founded the production company Blueprint Pictures.

He produced Millions by Danny Boyle, winner of the British Independent Film Award 2005 for Best Screenplay.

== Filmography ==
- Jack of Spades (2027) (producer)
- Wild Horse Nine (2026) (producer)
- How to Make a Killing (2026) (producer)
- All Of Us Strangers (2023) (producer)
- The Banshees of Inisherin (2022) (producer)
- A Boy Called Christmas (2021) (producer)
- The Last Letter from Your Lover (2021) (producer)
- Emma. (2020) (producer)
- The Guernsey Literary and Potato Peel Pie Society (2018) (producer)
- Three Billboards Outside Ebbing, Missouri (2017) (producer)
- The Mercy (2016) (producer)
- The Second Best Exotic Marigold Hotel (2015) (producer)
- The Riot Club (2014) (producer)
- Seven Psychopaths (2012) (producer)
- Now Is Good (2012) (producer)
- The Best Exotic Marigold Hotel (2011) (producer)
- In Bruges (2008) (producer)
- Wind Chill (2007) (producer)
- Becoming Jane (2007) (producer)
- Millions (2004) (producer)
- Gladiatress (2004) (producer)
- Piccadilly Jim (2004) (producer)
- Thunderpants (2002) (producer)
- Very Annie Mary (Annie-Mary à la folie! in France) (2001) (TV) (producer)
- Dancing at the Blue Iguana (2000) (producer)
- Some Voices (2000) (producer)
- A Texas Funeral (1999) (producer)
- The Debt Collector (1999) (producer)
- Splendor (1999) (producer)
- Welcome to Sarajevo (1997) (producer)

== See also ==
- List of Academy Award winners and nominees from Great Britain
