= Nature cure =

Nature cure, or natural care refer to methods of self-healing, often using fasting, dieting, rest, or hydrotherapy. Some of these are, for example, used in the following systems of alternative medicine:

- Orthopathy
- Naturopathy
