= Seven Psychopaths =

2012 film by Martin McDonagh

- Theatrical release poster
- Directed by: Martin McDonagh
- Written by: Martin McDonagh
- Produced by: Graham Broadbent; Peter Czernin; Martin McDonagh
- Starring: Colin Farrell; Sam Rockwell; Woody Harrelson; Christopher Walken
- Cinematography: Ben Davis
- Edited by: Lisa Gunning
- Music by: Carter Burwell
- Production companies: Blueprint Pictures; Film4; BFI; HanWay Films
- Distributed by: Momentum Pictures (United Kingdom); CBS Films (United States)
- Release dates: 7 September 2012 (TIFF); 12 October 2012 (United States); 5 December 2012 (United Kingdom)
- Running time: 110 minutes
- Country: United Kingdom
- Language: English
- Budget: $13.5–15 million
- Box office: $33 million

Seven Psychopaths is a 2012 British satirical crime comedy-drama film directed, written, and co-produced by Martin McDonagh and starring Colin Farrell, Sam Rockwell, Woody Harrelson, and Christopher Walken, with Tom Waits, Abbie Cornish, Olga Kurylenko, and Željko Ivanek in supporting roles. The film marks the second collaboration among McDonagh, Farrell, and Ivanek, following the director's In Bruges (2008).

Seven Psychopaths had its world premiere on 7 September 2012 at the Toronto International Film Festival, and was theatrically released in the United States and Canada on 12 October 2012, and in the United Kingdom on 5 December 2012. The film received positive reviews from critics.

== Plot ==
Marty is an alcoholic writer in Los Angeles stuck on his new screenplay, Seven Psychopaths—he has the title, but not the title characters. His best friend Billy is a struggling actor who makes a living kidnapping dogs and collecting rewards for their safe return. Billy's partner-in-crime Hans is a religious man whose wife Myra has cancer. Billy wants to work with Marty as a screenwriting duo, but is too embarrassed to ask Marty directly.

Billy shows Marty a newspaper story about "The Jack of Diamonds Killer", who leaves playing cards on his mafia victims, and Marty agrees to use him as one of the seven psychopaths. Billy also tells Marty a story he heard from a friend about "The Quaker", who stalked his daughter's killer for decades to drive him to suicide, but Marty is so drunk that he believes it was his own idea, leaving Billy frustrated. Billy puts an ad in the paper inviting psychopaths to share their stories with Marty, and Zachariah Rigby tells them about being half of a serial killer duo (with Maggie, his now-ex-lover) who killed other serial killers: the Texarkana Moonlight Murderer, the Cleveland Torso Murderer, and the Zodiac Killer. Zachariah implores Marty to include his phone number in the credits in the hope that Maggie will see the movie and seek him out again, and Marty agrees. He also comes up with a fourth psychopath: a former Viet Cong fighter who travels to the U.S. dressed as a priest, to take revenge on the soldiers responsible for killing his family in the My Lai massacre.

Billy is sleeping with Angela, the girlfriend of gangster Charlie Costello, and he and Hans steal Bonny, Charlie's beloved Shih Tzu dog. Charlie's men, led by Paulo, track Hans to his hideout and threaten to kill him and Marty, but the Jack of Diamonds Killer arrives, kills Paulo's men, then leaves. Hans and Marty flee, but Charlie finds Myra at the hospital and kills her when she refuses to give up Hans. When Billy hears of Myra's death from Hans, he shoots Angela in retaliation. Charlie and Paulo break into Billy's house to discover dozens of packs of cards, and realize that Billy is the Jack of Diamonds Killer.

Marty, Billy, and Hans hide out in the desert with Bonny. After Marty retells "his" Quaker story over dinner, Hans reveals that he is the real-life Quaker whom Billy originally heard the story from. Hans is impressed with Marty's screenplay draft, especially the Viet Cong fake-priest, but Marty—disillusioned with violence—admits that he would prefer to leave it unfinished. They pass the time discussing how to end the movie, with Billy suggesting a shootout where the Jack of Diamonds Killer dies a tragic hero.

While buying supplies, Marty and Hans see a headline that names Billy as the Jack of Diamonds Killer. Shaken, Marty gets drunk, while Billy and Hans take peyote. When confronted, Billy says that he merely wanted to inspire Marty, but Marty rejects Billy; they must return Bonny and face the consequences to end the cycle of violence. Billy, determined to force his dramatic shootout ending, sets their car on fire and calls Charlie to reveal their location. However, during the argument Hans has a vision of Myra in a "grey place", leading him to doubt his belief in the afterlife. He ignores Marty's and Billy's reassurances that it was a peyote-induced hallucination and wanders into the desert.

Charlie arrives alone, armed with only a flare gun. Billy shoots him, feeling cheated, and Marty—determined to prevent yet another death—drives Charlie to the nearest hospital. Meanwhile, Hans stumbles across Charlie's men, led by Paulo, at a nearby truck stop, but a patrol cruiser shows up and they cannot immediately grab him. Billy then realizes the flare gun's purpose and fires it into the air. Paulo and his men prepare to drive towards the signal, but Hans pretends to draw a weapon, causing Paulo to shoot him in front of the police and instigate a chase.

Paulo's men intercept Marty with Charlie, who returns to face Billy for a stand-off. Charlie shoots Billy as the police arrive. The gangsters are arrested, but Bonny stays at the dying Billy's side. Marty finds Hans' body, and a tape recorder with a suggestion for how to end the Viet Cong fighter's story with hope: his revenge is revealed as the dying dream of the first Buddhist monk to self-immolate in peaceful protest of the Vietnam War.

Marty adopts Bonny and finishes the screenplay. After Seven Psychopaths is released, Zachariah calls and threatens Marty for not including the message to Maggie in the credits as he promised. On hearing Marty's resigned acceptance of his fate, Zachariah realizes the experience of writing the movie has left him a changed man, and decides to spare him.

== Cast ==
- Colin Farrell as Marty Faranan
- Sam Rockwell as Billy Bickle
- Woody Harrelson as Charlie Costello
- Christopher Walken as Hans Kieslowski / The Quaker
  - Harry Dean Stanton as The Imagined Quaker
- Tom Waits as Zachariah Rigby
  - Brendan Sexton III as Young Zachariah Rigby
- Abbie Cornish as Kaya
- Olga Kurylenko as Angela
- Željko Ivanek as Paulo
- Linda Bright Clay as Myra Kieslowski
- Amanda Warren as Maggie Rigby
- Long Nguyen as the Vietnamese Priest / Thích Quảng Đức
- James Landry Hébert as Killer
- Christine Marzano as The Hooker
- Kevin Corrigan as Dennis
- Gabourey Sidibe as Sharice
- Michael Pitt as Larry
- Michael Stuhlbarg as Tommy
- Helena Mattsson as Blonde Lady

== Production ==
The first casting announcements were made on 12 May 2011. Mickey Rourke left The Expendables 2 to co-star in the film. He later dropped out of Seven Psychopaths after disagreements with McDonagh, calling him a "jerk-off". He was replaced by Woody Harrelson. Of the incident, McDonagh said "I was fine with it. Mickey's a great actor [...] I've known Woody [Harrelson] for years and years, and he was a perfect choice for this too. He's got those great dramatic elements which he's shown in Rampart recently, and he's always been a fantastic comedian. You need that in this – someone who can be out-and-out funny, but also turn sinister on a dime."

The film was shot in Los Angeles and Joshua Tree National Park, Twentynine Palms, California. Filming was completed late 2011.

=== Music ===
The film's score was composed by Carter Burwell, who previously composed the score to McDonagh's In Bruges. Lakeshore Records released the soundtrack digitally on 23 October 2012, with a physical release date of 20 November 2012.

== Reception ==
=== Box office ===
Seven Psychopaths was released in North America on 12 October 2012 and opened in 1,480 theaters in the United States. It grossed $1,360,000 on its opening day and $4,275,000 in its opening weekend, ranking #9 with a per theater average of $2,889. During its second weekend, it dropped down to #11 and grossed $3,273,480, with a per theater average of $2,212. By its third weekend, it dropped to #15 and made $1,498,350, with a per theater average of $1,494. It was released 5 December 2012 in the United Kingdom.

=== Critical response ===
Seven Psychopaths received positive reviews from critics. Review aggregator Rotten Tomatoes gives the film a score of 82%, based on 216 reviews, with an average rating of 7.1/10. The site's critical consensus reads, "Seven Psychopaths delivers sly cinematic commentary while serving up a heaping helping of sharp dialogue and gleeful violence." At Metacritic, which assigns a weighted mean rating out of 100 to reviews from mainstream critics, the film holds a score of 66 out of 100, based on 43 critics, indicating "generally favorable reviews". Audiences surveyed by CinemaScore gave the film an average grade of "B+" on an A+ to F scale.

Eric Kohn of IndieWire gave the film a positive review and an "A−" grade, praising McDonagh's writing, and stating that it "hits a unique pitch between dark, bloody satire and interpersonal conflicts that makes his finest work play like a combination of Quentin Tarantino and Aaron Sorkin." About the film itself, he wrote, "A less controlled and slapdash character piece than In Bruges, McDonagh's new movie benefits greatly from a plethora of one-liners that toy with crime movie clichés in the unlikely context of writerly obsessions." Claudia Puig of USA Today also gave the film a positive review, writing that "men in movies are often just overgrown boys, and Seven Psychopaths is out to prove it – in the most twisted, hilarious way possible."

Roger Ebert of Chicago Sun-Times gave the film three-and-a-half stars out of four. He praised the performances of main cast members and McDonagh's writing, stating that "Walken sometimes leans toward self-parody, but here his performance has a delicate, contained strangeness. All of the actors are good, and Farrell wisely allows the showier performances to circle around him. Like any screenwriter – like Tarantino, for example, who is possibly McDonagh's inspiration here – he brings these people into being and stands back in amazement." About the film, he added, "This is a delightfully goofy, self-aware movie that knows it is a movie."

Lisa Schwarzbaum of Entertainment Weekly gave the film a "B+" grade, stating, "An energetically demented psycho-killer comedy set in faux-noir L.A., Seven Psychopaths rollicks along to the unique narrative beat and language stylings of Anglo-Irish writer-director Martin McDonagh (In Bruges), channeling Quentin Tarantino." David Rooney of The Hollywood Reporter praised the performances of the main cast members, stating, "As creatively bankrupt Marty, Farrell is in subdued mode here, his performance largely defined by the endless expressivity of his eyebrows. He serves as an excellent foil for Rockwell, whose line readings continually dance between knowingness and idiocy, and Walken, who ventures as far into deadpan as you can go while remaining conscious. And Harrelson has fun contrasting his devotion to Bonny with his contempt for humanity." He wrote about the film that "while it's way behind the Pulp Fiction curve, Seven Psychopaths can be terrifically entertaining."

Catherine Shoard of The Guardian gave the film four stars out of five, and wrote, "There are scenes of complete brilliance, Walken is better than he's been in years, cute plot loops and grace notes." Peter Travers of Rolling Stone gave the film three stars out of four, stating, "Blood splatters, heads explode, and McDonagh takes sassy, self-mocking shots at the very notion of being literary in Hollywood. It's crazy-killer fun." Ty Burr of Boston Globe also gave the film three stars out of four, stating that the film is "absurdly entertaining even after it disappears up its own hindquarters in the last act, and it gives some of our weirder actors ample room to play." Michael Phillips of Chicago Tribune gave the film three stars out of four, writing that "the result is a clever, violent daydream. But McDonagh's skill behind the camera has grown considerably since In Bruges. And the way he writes, he's able to attract the ideal actors into his garden of psychopathology."

Dana Stevens of Slate magazine gave the film a positive review, stating, "It's at once a gangster movie, a buddy comedy, and a meta-fictional exploration of the limits of both genres - and if that sounds impossible to pull off, well, McDonagh doesn't, quite. But the pure sick brio of Seven Psychopaths takes it a long way." Richard Corliss of Time magazine also gave the film a positive review, writing that "small in stature but consistently entertaining, Seven Psychopaths is a vacation from consequence for the Tony- and Oscar-winning author, and an unsupervised play date for his cast of screw-loose stars."

James Berardinelli of ReelViews gave the film two-and-a-half stars out of four, stating, "On balance, one could argue that Seven Psychopaths warrants a better rating than a mediocre **1/2, but the aftertaste is so bitter that it diminishes the sweetness that started off the meal." Kevin Jagernauth of The Playlist also gave the film a mixed review, stating, "somewhat spastic and overcooked, Seven Psychopaths might have a few too many." Peter Debruge of Variety magazine also gave the film a mixed review, writing that "the film's overall tone is so cartoony, it's easy to imagine someone spinning off a macabre animated series of the same name....." and that "compared to McDonagh's best work for stage (The Lieutenant of Inishmore) and screen (In Bruges), Seven Psychopaths feels like either an older script knocking around the bottom of a drawer or a new one hastily tossed off between more ambitious projects."

=== Awards and nominations ===
Date	Group	Category	Recipients	Result
6–16 September 2012	Toronto International Film Festival	People Choice Award – Midnight Madness	Martin McDonagh	Won
10–21 October 2012	London Film Festival	Best Film	Martin McDonagh	Nominated
9 December 2012	Boston Society of Film Critics	Best Cast		Won
11 December 2012	San Diego Film Critics Society	Best Performance by an Ensemble		Nominated
11 December 2012	San Diego Film Critics Society	Best Supporting Actor	Christopher Walken	Nominated
10 February 2013	BAFTA Awards	Best British Film	Martin McDonagh, Graham Broadbent and Pete Czernin	Nominated
9 February 2013	Irish Film & Television Awards	Best Actor in a Lead Role in a Feature Film	Colin Farrell	Nominated
9 February 2013	Irish Film & Television Awards	Best Director – Film	Martin McDonagh	Nominated
9 February 2013	Irish Film & Television Awards	Best Script – Film	Martin McDonagh	Nominated
23 February 2013	Independent Spirit Awards	Best Screenplay	Martin McDonagh	Nominated
23 February 2013	Independent Spirit Awards	Best Supporting Male	Sam Rockwell	Nominated
26 June 2013	Saturn Awards	Best Horror or Thriller Film		Nominated
26 June 2013	Saturn Awards	Best Writing	Martin McDonagh	Nominated
