= John Patton Ford =

American film director

- Born: December 30, 1981 (age 44); Sumter, South Carolina, U.S.
- Occupations: Film director; screenwriter

John Patton Ford is an American film director and screenwriter. He wrote and directed the films Emily the Criminal (2022) and How to Make a Killing (2026).

== Early life and education ==
Ford was born in Sumter, South Carolina. He attended the University of South Carolina, and has a Master of Fine Arts from the American Film Institute.

== Career ==
Ford directed commercials for brands including Audi, Pepsi, Tide and Toyota. He also directed the music video for the song "Enemies" by Hannah Georgas. He wrote scripts for Disney, Universal, and Sony. He mentions Jacques Audiard and Michael Mann as some as his biggest influences.

After graduating, he spent years writing and trying to sell scripts. As he had hundreds of thousands of dollars of student debt, he took many jobs, including at a catering company. Before finally getting the chance to direct a movie, he had four other projects fall apart.

His first feature film was 2022's Emily the Criminal, starring Aubrey Plaza. The film received positive reviews, and for his work on it, Ford won the Independent Spirit Award for Best First Screenplay.

His next project was the dark comedy thriller How to Make a Killing, starring Glen Powell.

== Filmography ==
Short film

Year	Title	Director	Writer
2010	Patrol	Yes	Yes

Feature film

Year	Title	Director	Writer
2022	Emily the Criminal	Yes	Yes
2026	How to Make a Killing	Yes	Yes
