= Peter Czernin =

British-born film producer

The Right Honourable The Lord Howard de Walden
- Born: 1 January 1966 (age 60)
- Other name: Pete Czernin
- Occupation: Film producer
- Years active: 2005–present
- Family: Czernin family
- Website: www.blueprintpictures.com

Peter John Joseph Czernin, 11th Baron Howard de Walden (born 1 January 1966), also known as Peter Czernin or Count Peter Czernin von und zu Chudenitz, is a British-born film producer.

== Ancestry and early life ==
Czernin is the only son of Count Joseph Czernin von und zu Chudenitz (1924–2015) and Hazel Czernin, née Scott-Ellis, 10th Baroness Howard de Walden (1935–2024). He succeeded to the English peerage title of Baron Howard de Walden, which was created in 1597 by Queen Elizabeth I for Admiral Lord Thomas Howard, a younger son of Thomas Howard, 4th Duke of Norfolk.

== Career ==
He is the co-founder of production company Blueprint Pictures with Graham Broadbent.

As a producer, his work includes In Bruges (2008), The Best Exotic Marigold Hotel (2011), Seven Psychopaths (2012) and Three Billboards Outside Ebbing, Missouri (2017), a critically acclaimed film for which he was co-nominated for the Academy Award for Best Picture at the 90th Academy Awards.

== Personal life ==
He married on 17 September 1994, in Cambridge, Lucinda Suzanne Wright (born 1965). They have one daughter and one son:

- The Honourable Audrey Serena Angela (born 1997)
- The Honourable Alexander John Peter (born 1999)

== Filmography ==
- 2027: Jack of Spades (producer)
- 2026: Wild Horse Nine (producer)
- 2022: The Banshees of Inisherin (producer)
- 2022: Lady Chatterley's Lover (producer)
- 2021: A Boy Called Christmas (producer)
- 2021: The Last Letter from Your Lover (producer)
- 2020: Emma (producer)
- 2018: The Guernsey Literary and Potato Peel Pie Society (producer) (post-production)
- 2018: A Very English Scandal (TV movie) (executive producer) (post-production)
- 2018: The Mercy (producer)
- 2017: Three Billboards Outside Ebbing, Missouri (producer – produced by)
- 2016: The Last Dragonslayer (TV movie) (executive producer)
- 2015: The Outcast (TV mini-series) (producer – 2 episodes)
- 2015: The Second Best Exotic Marigold Hotel (producer – as Pete Czernin)
- 2014: The Riot Club (producer)
- 2012: Seven Psychopaths (producer)
- 2012: Now Is Good (producer – as Pete Czernin)
- 2011: The Best Exotic Marigold Hotel (producer as Pete Czernin)
- 2008: In Bruges (producer – as Pete Czernin, produced by)
- 2007: Wind Chill (producer)
- 2005: Piccadilly Jim (producer)
- 2004: Gladiatress (co-producer)
- 2001: Happy Campers (associate producer – as Pete Czernin)

Czech nobility
Preceded by Joseph Czernin	Count Czernin von und zu Chudenitz; 2015–present	Incumbent; Heir apparent: Hon. Alexander Czernin
Peerage of England
Preceded by Hazel Czernin	Baron Howard de Walden; 2024–present	Incumbent; Heir apparent: Hon. Alexander Czernin
