= BAFTA Award for Best Film =

British film industry award

- Awarded for: Excellence in cinema
- Location: United Kingdom
- Presented by: British Academy of Film and Television Arts
- Currently held by: One Battle After Another (2025)
- Website: bafta.org

The BAFTA Award for Best Film is a film award given annually by the British Academy of Film and Television Arts and presented at the British Academy Film Awards. It has been given since the 1st BAFTA Awards, representing the best films of 1947, but until 1969 it was called the BAFTA Award for Best Film From Any Source. It is possible for films from any country to be nominated, although British films are also recognised in the category BAFTA Award for Outstanding British Film and (since 1983) foreign-language films in BAFTA Award for Best Film Not in the English Language. As such, there have been multiple occasions of a film being nominated in two of these categories (and even winning both, for example Conclave).

There has been one tie for the Best Film Award when, in 1962, Ballad of a Soldier tied with The Hustler for Best Film From Any Source. Throughout the history of the category, the award has been given to the director(s), the producer(s) or both.

- Between 1949 and 1959, 1962–1965, 1970–1976, and in 1979; Only the film itself and not producers or directors received the award and nomination.
- Between 1960 and 1961, 1966–1969, and in 1980; Only directors received the award and nomination.
- Between 1988 and 1997; Both producers and directors received the award and nomination.
- Between 1977 and 1978, 1981–1987, and since 1998; Only producers counted as winners and nominees in this category.

In the following lists, the titles and names in bold with a gold background are the winners and recipients respectively; those not in bold are the nominees. The years given are those in which the films under consideration were released, not the year of the ceremony, which always takes place the following year.

== Winners and nominees ==
indicates the winner

=== 1940s ===
Year	Film	Director(s)	Producer(s)	Country
Best Film from Any Source
**1947** (1st)	**The Best Years of Our Lives** †	**William Wyler**	**Samuel Goldwyn**	**United States**
**1948** (2nd)	**Hamlet** †	**Laurence Olivier**	**Laurence Olivier**	**United Kingdom**
**1948** (2nd)	Crossfire	Edward Dmytryk	Adrian Scott	United States
**1948** (2nd)	The Fallen Idol	Carol Reed	Carol Reed	United Kingdom
**1948** (2nd)	Monsieur Vincent	Maurice Cloche	Viscount George de la Grandiere	France
**1948** (2nd)	The Naked City	Jules Dassin	Mark Hellinger	United States
**1948** (2nd)	Paisan (Paisà)	Roberto Rossellini	Rod E. Geiger, Roberto Rossellini	Italy
**1948** (2nd)	Four Steps in the Clouds (Quattro passi fra le nuvole)	Alessandro Blasetti	Giuseppe Amato	Italy
**1949** (3rd)	**Bicycle Thieves** (Ladri di biciclette)	**Vittorio De Sica**	**Giuseppe Amato**	**Italy**
**1949** (3rd)	The Berliner (Berliner Ballade)	R. A. Stemmle	Alf Teichs	Germany
**1949** (3rd)	The Last Stage (Ostatni etap)	Wanda Jakubowska	Wanda Jakubowska, Gerda Schneider	Poland
**1949** (3rd)	The Set-Up	Robert Wise	Richard Goldstone	United States
**1949** (3rd)	The Third Man	Carol Reed	Carol Reed	United Kingdom
**1949** (3rd)	The Treasure of the Sierra Madre	John Huston	Henry Blanke	United States
**1949** (3rd)	The Window	Ted Tetzlaff	Frederic Ullman Jr.	United States

=== 1950s ===
Year	Film	Director(s)	Producer(s)	Country
**1950** (4th)	**All About Eve** †	**Joseph L. Mankiewicz**	**Darryl F. Zanuck**	**United States**
**1950** (4th)	The Asphalt Jungle	John Huston	Arthur Hornblow Jr.	United States
**1950** (4th)	Beauty and the Devil (La Beauté du diable)	René Clair	Salvo D'Angelo	France
**1950** (4th)	Intruder in the Dust	Clarence Brown	Clarence Brown	United States
**1950** (4th)	The Men	Fred Zinnemann	Stanley Kramer	United States
**1950** (4th)	On the Town	Stanley Donen, Gene Kelly	Arthur Freed	United States
**1950** (4th)	Orphée (US: Orpheus)	Jean Cocteau	André Paulvé	France
**1951** (5th)	**La Ronde**	**Max Ophüls**	**Ralph Baum, Sacha Gordine**	**France**
**1951** (5th)	An American in Paris †	Vincente Minnelli	Arthur Freed	United States
**1951** (5th)	The Browning Version	Anthony Asquith	Teddy Baird	United Kingdom
**1951** (5th)	Detective Story	William Wyler	William Wyler	United States
**1951** (5th)	Sunday in August (Domenica d'agosto)	Luciano Emmer	Sergio Amidei	Italy
**1951** (5th)	Fourteen Hours	Henry Hathaway	Sol C. Siegel	United States
**1951** (5th)	Miss Julie (Fröken Julie)	Alf Sjöberg	Rune Waldekranz	Sweden
**1951** (5th)	The Lavender Hill Mob	Charles Crichton	Michael Balcon	United Kingdom
**1951** (5th)	The Magic Box (1951)	John Boulting	Ronald Neame	United Kingdom
**1951** (5th)	The Magic Garden	Donald Swanson	Donald Swanson	United Kingdom
**1951** (5th)	The Man in the White Suit	Alexander Mackendrick	Michael Balcon	United Kingdom
**1951** (5th)	No Resting Place	Paul Rotha	Colin Lesslie	United Kingdom
**1951** (5th)	The Red Badge of Courage	John Huston	Gottfried Reinhardt	United States
**1951** (5th)	The Small Miracle	Maurice Cloche, Ralph Smart	Anthony Havelock-Allan	United Kingdom
**1951** (5th)	The Sound of Fury	Cyril Endfield	Robert Stillman	United States
**1951** (5th)	A Walk in the Sun	Lewis Milestone	Lewis Milestone	United States
**1951** (5th)	White Corridors	Pat Jackson	John Croydon, Joseph Janni	United Kingdom
**1951** (5th)	Edward and Caroline (Édouard et Caroline)	Jacques Becker	Raymond Borderie	France
**1952** (6th)	**The Sound Barrier**	**David Lean**	**David Lean**	**United Kingdom**
**1952** (6th)	The African Queen	John Huston	Sam Spiegel	United Kingdom
**1952** (6th)	Angels One Five	George More O'Ferrall	John W. Gossage, Derek N. Twist	United Kingdom
**1952** (6th)	The Boy Kumasenu	Sean Graham		Ghana
**1952** (6th)	Carrie	William Wyler	William Wyler	United States
**1952** (6th)	Casque d'Or	Jacques Becker	Robert and Raymond Hakim	France
**1952** (6th)	Cry, the Beloved Country	Zoltán Korda	Zoltán Korda, Alan Paton	United Kingdom
**1952** (6th)	Death of a Salesman	László Benedek	Stanley Kramer	United States
**1952** (6th)	Limelight	Charles Chaplin	Charles Chaplin	United States
**1952** (6th)	Mandy	Alexander Mackendrick, Fred F. Sears	Michael Balcon, Leslie Norman	United Kingdom
**1952** (6th)	Miracle in Milan (Miracolo a Milano)	Vittorio De Sica	Vittorio De Sica	Italy
**1952** (6th)	The Young and the Damned (Los olvidados)	Luis Buñuel	Óscar Dancigers, Sergio Kogan, Jaime A. Menasce	Mexico
**1952** (6th)	Outcast of the Islands	Carol Reed	Carol Reed	United Kingdom
**1952** (6th)	Rashomon (羅生門, Rashōmon)	Akira Kurosawa	Minoru Jingo	Japan
**1952** (6th)	The River	Jean Renoir	Kenneth McEldowney, Jean Renoir	United Kingdom
**1952** (6th)	Singin' in the Rain	Stanley Donen, Gene Kelly	Arthur Freed	United States
**1952** (6th)	A Streetcar Named Desire	Elia Kazan	Charles K. Feldman	United States
**1952** (6th)	Viva Zapata!	Elia Kazan	Darryl F. Zanuck	United States
**1953** (7th)	**Forbidden Games** (Jeux interdits)	**René Clément**	**Robert Dorfmann**	**France**
**1953** (7th)	The Bad and the Beautiful	Vincente Minnelli	John Houseman	United States
**1953** (7th)	Come Back, Little Sheba	Daniel Mann	Hal B. Wallis	United States
**1953** (7th)	The Cruel Sea	Charles Frend	Leslie Norman	United Kingdom
**1953** (7th)	Two Cents Worth of Hope (Due soldi di speranza)	Renato Castellani	Sandro Ghenzi	Italy
**1953** (7th)	From Here to Eternity †	Fred Zinnemann	Milo Adler-Gillies	United States
**1953** (7th)	Genevieve	Henry Cornelius	Henry Cornelius	United Kingdom
**1953** (7th)	The Heart of the Matter	George More O'Ferrall	Ian Dalrymple	United Kingdom
**1953** (7th)	Julius Caesar	Joseph L. Mankiewicz	John Houseman	United States
**1953** (7th)	The Kidnappers (US: The Little Kidnappers)	Philip Leacock	Sergei Nolbandov, Leslie Parkyn	United Kingdom
**1953** (7th)	Lili	Charles Walters	Edwin H. Knopf	United States
**1953** (7th)	The Medium (Il medium)	Gian-Carlo Menotti	Walther Lowendahl	Italy
**1953** (7th)	Mogambo	John Ford	Sam Zimbalist	United States
**1953** (7th)	Moulin Rouge	John Huston	John and James Woolf	United Kingdom
**1953** (7th)	Are We All Murderers? (Nous sommes tous des assassins)	André Cayatte	François Carron	France
**1953** (7th)	Little World of Don Camillo (Don Camillo)	Julien Duvivier	Giuseppe Amato	Italy; France
**1953** (7th)	Roman Holiday	William Wyler	William Wyler	United States
**1953** (7th)	Shane	George Stevens	George Stevens	United States
**1953** (7th)	The Sun Shines Bright	John Ford	Merian C. Cooper, John Ford	United States
**1954** (8th)	**The Wages of Fear** (Le salaire de la peur)	**Henri-Georges Clouzot**	**Raymond Borderie**	**France**
**1954** (8th)	The Caine Mutiny	Edward Dmytryk	Stanley Kramer	United States
**1954** (8th)	Carrington V.C.	Anthony Asquith	Teddy Baird	United Kingdom
**1954** (8th)	The Divided Heart	Charles Crichton	Michael Truman	United Kingdom
**1954** (8th)	Doctor in the House	Ralph Thomas	Betty E. Box	United Kingdom
**1954** (8th)	Executive Suite	Robert Wise	John Houseman	United States
**1954** (8th)	For Better, for Worse	J. Lee Thompson	Kenneth Harper	United Kingdom
**1954** (8th)	Hobson's Choice	David Lean	David Lean	United Kingdom
**1954** (8th)	How to Marry a Millionaire	Jean Negulesco	Nunnally Johnson	United States
**1954** (8th)	Gate of Hell (地獄門, Jigokumon)	Teinosuke Kinugasa	Masaichi Nagata	Japan
**1954** (8th)	The Maggie	Alexander Mackendrick	Michael Truman	United Kingdom
**1954** (8th)	The Moon Is Blue	Otto Preminger	Otto Preminger	United States
**1954** (8th)	On the Waterfront †	Elia Kazan	Sam Spiegel	United States
**1954** (8th)	Bread, Love and Dreams (Pane, amore e fantasia)	Luigi Comencini	Marcello Girosi	Italy
**1954** (8th)	The Purple Plain	Robert Parrish	John Bryan	United Kingdom
**1954** (8th)	Rear Window	Alfred Hitchcock	Alfred Hitchcock	United States
**1954** (8th)	Riot in Cell Block 11	Don Siegel	Walter Wanger	United States
**1954** (8th)	Robinson Crusoe (Aventuras de Robinson Crusoe)	Luis Buñuel	Óscar Dancigers, Henry F. Ehrlich	Mexico
**1954** (8th)	Romeo and Juliet	Renato Castellani	Sandro Ghenzi, Joseph Janni	United Kingdom
**1954** (8th)	Seven Brides for Seven Brothers	Stanley Donen	Jack Cummings	United States
**1955** (9th)	**Richard III**	**Laurence Olivier**	**Laurence Olivier**	**United Kingdom**
**1955** (9th)	Bad Day at Black Rock	John Sturges	Dore Schary	United States
**1955** (9th)	Carmen Jones	Otto Preminger	Otto Preminger	United States
**1955** (9th)	The Colditz Story	Guy Hamilton	Ivan Foxwell	United Kingdom
**1955** (9th)	The Dam Busters	Michael Anderson	Robert Clark, W. A. Whittaker	United Kingdom
**1955** (9th)	East of Eden	Elia Kazan	Elia Kazan	United States
**1955** (9th)	The Ladykillers	Alexander Mackendrick	Seth Holt, Michael Balcon	United Kingdom
**1955** (9th)	Marty †	Delbert Mann	Harold Hecht	United States
**1955** (9th)	The Night My Number Came Up	Leslie Norman	Michael Balcon	United Kingdom
**1955** (9th)	The Prisoner	Peter Glenville	Vivian Cox	United Kingdom
**1955** (9th)	Seven Samurai (七人の侍, Shichinin no Samurai)	Akira Kurosawa	Sojiro Motoki	Japan
**1955** (9th)	Simba	Brian Desmond Hurst	Peter De Sarigny	United Kingdom
**1955** (9th)	La Strada	Federico Fellini	Dino De Laurentiis, Carlo Ponti	Italy
**1955** (9th)	Summertime	David Lean	Ilya Lopert	United Kingdom; United States
**1956** (10th)	**Gervaise**	**René Clément**	**Annie Dorfmann**	**France**
**1956** (10th)	Friends for Life (Amici per la pelle)	Franco Rossi	Carlo Civallero	Italy
**1956** (10th)	Baby Doll	Elia Kazan	Elia Kazan, Tennessee Williams	United States
**1956** (10th)	The Battle of the River Plate	Michael Powell, Emeric Pressburger	Michael Powell, Emeric Pressburger	United Kingdom
**1956** (10th)	The Unfrocked One (Le Défroqué)	Léo Joannon	Alain Poiré, Roger Ribadeau-Dumas	France
**1956** (10th)	Guys and Dolls	Joseph L. Mankiewicz	Samuel Goldwyn	United States
**1956** (10th)	The Killing	Stanley Kubrick	James B. Harris	United States
**1956** (10th)	The Man Who Never Was	Ronald Neame	André Hakim	United Kingdom
**1956** (10th)	The Man with the Golden Arm	Otto Preminger	Otto Preminger	United States
**1956** (10th)	Picnic	Joshua Logan	Fred Kohlmar	United States
**1956** (10th)	The Grasshopper (Попрыгунья, Poprygunya)	Samson Samsonov	Tatyana Berezantseva, Anatoliy Bobrovskiy	Soviet Union
**1956** (10th)	Reach for the Sky	Lewis Gilbert	Daniel M. Angel	United Kingdom
**1956** (10th)	Rebel Without a Cause	Nicholas Ray	David Weisbart	United States
**1956** (10th)	Shadow (Cień)	Jerzy Kawalerowicz		Poland
**1956** (10th)	Smiles of a Summer Night (Sommarnattens leende)	Ingmar Bergman	Allan Ekelund	Sweden
**1956** (10th)	A Town Like Alice	Jack Lee	Joseph Janni	United Kingdom
**1956** (10th)	The Trouble with Harry	Alfred Hitchcock	Alfred Hitchcock	United States
**1956** (10th)	War and Peace	King Vidor	Dino De Laurentiis	United States; Italy
**1956** (10th)	Yield to the Night	J. Lee Thompson	Kenneth Harper	United Kingdom
**1957** (11th)	**The Bridge on the River Kwai** †	**David Lean**	**Sam Spiegel**	**United Kingdom**; **United States**
**1957** (11th)	12 Angry Men	Sidney Lumet	Henry Fonda, Reginald Rose	United States
**1957** (11th)	3:10 to Yuma	Delmer Daves	David Heilweil	United States
**1957** (11th)	The Bachelor Party	Delbert Mann	Harold Hecht	United States
**1957** (11th)	He Who Must Die (Celui qui doit mourir)	Jules Dassin	Henri Bérard	France
**1957** (11th)	Edge of the City	Martin Ritt	David Susskind	United States
**1957** (11th)	Heaven Knows, Mr. Allison	John Huston	Buddy Adler, Eugene Frenke	United States
**1957** (11th)	Pather Panchali (পথের পাঁচালী, Pôther Pãchali)	Satyajit Ray	Government of West Bengal	India
**1957** (11th)	Paths of Glory	Stanley Kubrick	Kirk Douglas, James B. Harris, Stanley Kubrick	United States
**1957** (11th)	Gates of Paris (Porte des Lilas )	René Clair	René Clair	France
**1957** (11th)	The Prince and the Showgirl	Laurence Olivier	Laurence Olivier	United Kingdom
**1957** (11th)	The Shiralee	Leslie Norman	Michael Balcon, Jack Rix	United Kingdom
**1957** (11th)	That Night!	John Newland	Himan Brown	United States
**1957** (11th)	The Tin Star	Anthony Mann	William Perlberg, George Seaton	United States
**1957** (11th)	A Man Escaped (Un condamné à mort s'est échappé)	Robert Bresson	Alain Poiré, Jean Thuillier	France
**1957** (11th)	Windom's Way	Ronald Neame	John Bryan	United Kingdom
**1958** (12th)	**Room at the Top**	**Jack Clayton**	**John and James Woolf**	**United Kingdom**
**1958** (12th)	Aparajito (অপরাজিত, Ôporajito)	Satyajit Ray	Satyajit Ray	India
**1958** (12th)	Cat on a Hot Tin Roof	Richard Brooks	Lawrence Weingarten	United States
**1958** (12th)	The Defiant Ones	Stanley Kramer	Stanley Kramer	United States
**1958** (12th)	Ice Cold in Alex	J. Lee Thompson	W.A. Whittaker	United Kingdom
**1958** (12th)	Indiscreet	Stanley Donen	Stanley Donen	United Kingdom
**1958** (12th)	The Cranes Are Flying (Летят журавли, Letyat zhuravli)	Mikhail Kalatozov	Mikhail Kalatozov	Soviet Union
**1958** (12th)	No Down Payment	Martin Ritt	Jerry Wald	United States
**1958** (12th)	Nights of Cabiria (Le notti di Cabiria)	Federico Fellini	Dino De Laurentiis	Italy
**1958** (12th)	Orders to Kill	Anthony Asquith	Anthony Havelock-Allan	United Kingdom
**1958** (12th)	Sea of Sand	Guy Green	Robert S. Baker, Monty Berman	United Kingdom
**1958** (12th)	The Sheepman	George Marshall	Edmund Grainger	United States
**1958** (12th)	Wild Strawberries (Smultronstället)	Ingmar Bergman	Allan Ekelund	Sweden
**1958** (12th)	The Young Lions	Edward Dmytryk	Al Lichtman	United States
**1959** (13th)	**Ben-Hur** †	**William Wyler**	**Sam Zimbalist**	**United States**
**1959** (13th)	Anatomy of a Murder	Otto Preminger	Otto Preminger	United States
**1959** (13th)	The Magician (Ansiktet)	Ingmar Bergman	Allan Ekelund	Sweden
**1959** (13th)	The Big Country	William Wyler	Gregory Peck, William Wyler	United States
**1959** (13th)	Compulsion	Richard Fleischer	Richard D. Zanuck	United States
**1959** (13th)	Gigi †	Vincente Minnelli	Arthur Freed	United States
**1959** (13th)	Look Back in Anger	Tony Richardson	Harry Saltzman	United Kingdom
**1959** (13th)	Maigret Sets a Trap (Maigret tend un piège)	Jean Delannoy	J.P. Guibert	France
**1959** (13th)	North West Frontier	J. Lee Thompson	Marcel Hellman	United Kingdom
**1959** (13th)	The Nun's Story	Fred Zinnemann	Henry Blanke	United States
**1959** (13th)	Ashes and Diamonds (Popiół i diament)	Andrzej Wajda		Poland
**1959** (13th)	Sapphire	Basil Dearden	Michael Relph	United Kingdom
**1959** (13th)	Some Like It Hot	Billy Wilder	Billy Wilder	United States
**1959** (13th)	Tiger Bay	J. Lee Thompson	John Hawkesworth, Leslie Parkyn, Julian Wintle	United Kingdom
**1959** (13th)	Yesterday's Enemy	Val Guest	Michael Carreras	United Kingdom

=== 1960s ===
Year	Film	Director(s)	Producer(s)	Country
**1960** (14th)	**The Apartment** †	**Billy Wilder**	**Billy Wilder**	**United States**
**1960** (14th)	The 400 Blows (Les quatre cents coups)	François Truffaut	François Truffaut, Georges Charlot	France
**1960** (14th)	The Angry Silence	Guy Green	Richard Attenborough, Bryan Forbes	United Kingdom
**1960** (14th)	The Adventure (L'avventura)	Michelangelo Antonioni	Cino Del Duca, Robert and Raymond Hakim, Amato Pennasilico, Luciano Perugia	Italy
**1960** (14th)	La Dolce Vita	Federico Fellini	Giuseppe Amato, Angelo Rizzoli	Italy; France
**1960** (14th)	Elmer Gantry	Richard Brooks	Bernard Smith	United States
**1960** (14th)	Hiroshima mon amour (二十四時間の情事, Nijūyojikan'nojōji)	Alain Resnais	Anatole Dauman, Samy Halfon	France; Japan
**1960** (14th)	Inherit the Wind	Stanley Kramer	Stanley Kramer	United States
**1960** (14th)	Let's Make Love	George Cukor	Jerry Wald	United States
**1960** (14th)	Black Orpheus (Orfeu Negro)	Marcel Camus	Sacha Gordine	Brazil; France
**1960** (14th)	Never on Sunday (Ποτέ την Κυριακή, Poté tin Kyriakí)	Jules Dassin	Jules Dassin	Greece; United States
**1960** (14th)	Saturday Night and Sunday Morning	Karel Reisz	Tony Richardson	United Kingdom
**1960** (14th)	Shadows	John Cassavetes	Maurice McEndree	United States
**1960** (14th)	Spartacus	Stanley Kubrick	Edward Lewis	United States
**1960** (14th)	The Testament of Orpheus (Le testament d'Orphée)	Jean Cocteau	Jean Thuillier	France
**1960** (14th)	The Trials of Oscar Wilde	Ken Hughes	Irving Allen, Albert R. Broccoli, Harold Huth	United Kingdom
**1960** (14th)	Tunes of Glory	Ronald Neame	Colin Lesslie	United Kingdom
**1961** (15th)	**Ballad of a Soldier** (Баллада о солдате, Ballada o soldate) (ex-æquo)	**Grigori Chukhrai**	**M. Chernova**	**Soviet Union**
**1961** (15th)	**The Hustler** (ex-æquo)	**Robert Rossen**	**Robert Rossen**	**United States**
**1961** (15th)	The World of Apu	Satyajit Ray	Satyajit Ray	India
**1961** (15th)	The Innocents	Jack Clayton	Jack Clayton	United Kingdom
**1961** (15th)	Judgment at Nuremberg	Stanley Kramer	Stanley Kramer	United States
**1961** (15th)	The Long and the Short and the Tall	Leslie Norman	Michael Balcon	United Kingdom
**1961** (15th)	Rocco and His Brothers (Rocco e i suoi fratelli)	Luchino Visconti	Goffredo Lombardo	Italy
**1961** (15th)	The Sundowners	Fred Zinnemann	Gerry Blattner	United Kingdom
**1961** (15th)	A Taste of Honey	Tony Richardson	Tony Richardson	United Kingdom
**1961** (15th)	The Hole (Le Trou; US: The Night Watch)	Jacques Becker	Serge Silberman	France
**1961** (15th)	Whistle Down the Wind	Bryan Forbes	Richard Attenborough	United Kingdom
**1962** (16th)	**Lawrence of Arabia** †	**David Lean**	**Sam Spiegel**	**United Kingdom**
**1962** (16th)	Last Year at Marienbad (L'Année dernière à Marienbad)	Alain Resnais	Pierre Courau, Raymond Froment	France; Italy
**1962** (16th)	Billy Budd	Peter Ustinov	Peter Ustinov	United Kingdom
**1962** (16th)	The Elusive Corporal (Le Caporal épinglé)	Jean Renoir	Adry De Carbuccia, Roland Girard	France
**1962** (16th)	The Lady with the Dog ( Дама с собачкой, Dama s sobachkoy)	Iosif Kheifits		Soviet Union
**1962** (16th)	The Naked Island (裸の島, Hadaka no Shima)	Kaneto Shindō	Kaneto Shindo, Matsuura Eisaku	Japan
**1962** (16th)	Jules and Jim (Jules et Jim)	François Truffaut	Marcel Berbert, François Truffaut	France
**1962** (16th)	A Kind of Loving	John Schlesinger	Joseph Janni	United Kingdom
**1962** (16th)	The L-Shaped Room	Bryan Forbes	Richard Attenborough, James Woolf	United Kingdom
**1962** (16th)	Lola	Jacques Demy	Georges de Beauregard, Carlo Ponti	France; Italy
**1962** (16th)	The Manchurian Candidate	John Frankenheimer	George Axelrod, John Frankenheimer	United States
**1962** (16th)	The Miracle Worker	Arthur Penn	Fred Coe	United States
**1962** (16th)	Only Two Can Play	Sidney Gilliat	Leslie Gilliat	United Kingdom
**1962** (16th)	Phaedra (Φαίδρα)	Jules Dassin	Jules Dassin	Greece; United States
**1962** (16th)	Through a Glass Darkly (Såsom i en spegel)	Ingmar Bergman	Allan Ekelund	Sweden
**1962** (16th)	Thou Shalt Not Kill (Tu ne tueras point)	Claude Autant-Lara	Moris Ergas	France; Yugoslavia
**1962** (16th)	The Long Absence (Une aussi longue absence)	Henri Colpi	Alberto Barsanti, Claude Jaeger, Jacques Nahum	France; Italy
**1962** (16th)	West Side Story †	Jerome Robbins, Robert Wise	Robert Wise	United States
**1963** (17th)	**Tom Jones** †	**Tony Richardson**	**Tony Richardson**	**United Kingdom**
**1963** (17th)	8½ (Otto e mezzo)	Federico Fellini	Angelo Rizzoli	Italy
**1963** (17th)	Billy Liar	John Schlesinger	Joseph Janni	United Kingdom
**1963** (17th)	David and Lisa	Frank Perry	Paul Heller	United States
**1963** (17th)	Days of Wine and Roses	Blake Edwards	Martin Manulis	United States
**1963** (17th)	Divorce Italian Style (Divorzio all'italiana)	Pietro Germi	Franco Cristaldi	Italy
**1963** (17th)	Hud	Martin Ritt	Irving Ravetch, Martin Ritt	United States
**1963** (17th)	Knife in the Water (Nóż w wodzie)	Roman Polanski	Stanislaw Zylewicz	Poland
**1963** (17th)	The Four Days of Naples (Le quattro giornate di Napoli)	Nanni Loy	Goffredo Lombardo	Italy
**1963** (17th)	The Servant	Joseph Losey	Joseph Losey, Norman Priggen	United Kingdom
**1963** (17th)	This Sporting Life	Lindsay Anderson	Karel Reisz	United Kingdom
**1963** (17th)	To Kill a Mockingbird	Robert Mulligan	Alan J. Pakula	United States
**1964** (18th)	**Dr. Strangelove or: How I Learned to Stop Worrying and Love the Bomb**	**Stanley Kubrick**	**Stanley Kubrick**	**United Kingdom**; **United States**
**1964** (18th)	Becket	Peter Glenville	Hal B. Wallis	United Kingdom
**1964** (18th)	The Pumpkin Eater	Jack Clayton	James Woolf	United Kingdom
**1964** (18th)	The Train	John Frankenheimer	Jules Bricken	United Kingdom
**1965** (19th)	**My Fair Lady** †	**George Cukor**	**Jack L. Warner**	**United States**
**1965** (19th)	Hamlet (Гамлет, Gamlet)	Grigori Kozintsev		Soviet Union
**1965** (19th)	The Hill	Sidney Lumet	Kenneth Hyman	United Kingdom
**1965** (19th)	The Knack ...and How to Get It	Richard Lester	Oscar Lewenstein	United Kingdom
**1965** (19th)	Zorba the Greek (Αλέξης Ζορμπάς, Alexis Zorbas)	Michael Cacoyannis	Michael Cacoyannis	Greece; United States
**1966** (20th)	**Who's Afraid of Virginia Woolf?**	**Mike Nichols**	**Ernest Lehman**	**United States**
**1966** (20th)	Doctor Zhivago	David Lean	David Lean, Carlo Ponti	United Kingdom; Italy
**1966** (20th)	Morgan – A Suitable Case for Treatment	Karel Reisz	Leon Clore	United Kingdom
**1966** (20th)	The Spy Who Came in From The Cold	Martin Ritt	Martin Ritt	United Kingdom
**1967** (21st)	**A Man For All Seasons** †	**Fred Zinnemann**	**Fred Zinnemann**	**United Kingdom**
**1967** (21st)	Bonnie and Clyde	Arthur Penn	Warren Beatty	United States
**1967** (21st)	In the Heat of the Night †	Norman Jewison	Walter Mirisch	United States
**1967** (21st)	A Man and a Woman (Un homme et une femme)	Claude Lelouch	Claude Lelouch	France
Best Film
**1968** (22nd)	**The Graduate**	**Mike Nichols**	**Mike Nichols**	**United States**
**1968** (22nd)	2001: A Space Odyssey	Stanley Kubrick	Stanley Kubrick	United Kingdom
**1968** (22nd)	Oliver! †	Carol Reed	John Woolf	United Kingdom
**1968** (22nd)	Closely Observed Trains (Ostře sledované vlaky)	Jiří Menzel	Dr. Zdenek Oves	Czechoslovakia
**1969** (23rd)	**Midnight Cowboy** †	**John Schlesinger**	**Jerome Hellman**	**United States**
**1969** (23rd)	Oh! What a Lovely War	Richard Attenborough	Richard Attenborough, Brian Duffy	United Kingdom
**1969** (23rd)	Women in Love	Ken Russell	Larry Kramer	United Kingdom
**1969** (23rd)	Z	Costa Gavras	Jacques Perrin, Ahmed Rachedi	Algeria; France

=== 1970s ===
Year	Film	Director(s)	Producer(s)	Country
**1970** (24th)	**Butch Cassidy and the Sundance Kid**	**George Roy Hill**	**John Foreman**	**United States**
**1970** (24th)	Kes	Kenneth Loach	Tony Garnett	United Kingdom
**1970** (24th)	M*A*S*H	Robert Altman	Ingo Preminger	United States
**1970** (24th)	Ryan's Daughter	David Lean	Anthony Havelock-Allan	United Kingdom
**1971** (25th)	**Sunday Bloody Sunday**	**John Schlesinger**	**Joseph Janni**	**United Kingdom**
**1971** (25th)	The Go-Between	Joseph Losey	John Heyman, Denis Johnson, Norman Priggen	United Kingdom
**1971** (25th)	Death in Venice (Morte a Venezia)	Luchino Visconti	Luchino Visconti	Italy; France
**1971** (25th)	Taking Off	Miloš Forman	Alfred W. Crown	United States
**1972** (26th)	**Cabaret**	**Bob Fosse**	**Cy Feuer**	**United States**
**1972** (26th)	A Clockwork Orange	Stanley Kubrick	Stanley Kubrick	United Kingdom
**1972** (26th)	The French Connection †	William Friedkin	Philip D'Antoni	United States
**1972** (26th)	The Last Picture Show	Peter Bogdanovich	Stephen J. Friedman	United States
**1973** (27th)	**Day for Night** (La Nuit américaine)	**François Truffaut**	**Marcel Berbert**	**France**
**1973** (27th)	The Day of the Jackal	Fred Zinnemann	John Woolf	United Kingdom; France
**1973** (27th)	The Discreet Charm of the Bourgeoisie (Le Charme discret de la bourgeoisie)	Luis Buñuel	Serge Silberman	France; Italy; Spain
**1973** (27th)	Don't Look Now	Nicolas Roeg	Peter Katz	United Kingdom; Italy
**1974** (28th)	**Lacombe, Lucien**	**Louis Malle**	**Louis Malle, Claude Nedjar**	**France**; **West Germany**; **Italy**
**1974** (28th)	Chinatown	Roman Polanski	Robert Evans	United States
**1974** (28th)	The Last Detail	Hal Ashby	Gerald Ayres	United States
**1974** (28th)	Murder on the Orient Express	Sidney Lumet	John Brabourne, Richard B. Goodwin	United Kingdom
**1975** (29th)	**Alice Doesn't Live Here Anymore**	**Martin Scorsese**	**Audrey Maas, David Susskind**	**United States**
**1975** (29th)	Barry Lyndon	Stanley Kubrick	Stanley Kubrick	United Kingdom
**1975** (29th)	Dog Day Afternoon	Sidney Lumet	Martin Bregman, Martin Elfand	United States
**1975** (29th)	Jaws	Steven Spielberg	David Brown, Richard D. Zanuck	United States
**1976** (30th)	**One Flew Over the Cuckoo's Nest** †	**Miloš Forman**	**Michael Douglas, Saul Zaentz**	**United States**
**1976** (30th)	All the President's Men	Alan J. Pakula	Walter Coblenz	United States
**1976** (30th)	Bugsy Malone	Alan Parker	Alan Marshall	United Kingdom
**1976** (30th)	Taxi Driver	Martin Scorsese	Julia Phillips, Michael Phillips	United States
**1977** (31st)	**Annie Hall** †	**Woody Allen**	**Charles H. Joffe, Jack Rollins**	**United States**
**1977** (31st)	A Bridge Too Far	Richard Attenborough	Joseph E. Levine, Richard P. Levine	United Kingdom; United States
**1977** (31st)	Network	Sidney Lumet	Howard Gottfried	United States
**1977** (31st)	Rocky †	John G. Avildsen	Robert Chartoff, Irwin Winkler	United States
**1978** (32nd)	**Julia**	**Fred Zinnemann**	**Richard Roth**	**United States**
**1978** (32nd)	Close Encounters of the Third Kind	Steven Spielberg	Julia Phillips, Michael Phillips	United States
**1978** (32nd)	Midnight Express	Alan Parker	Alan Marshall, David Puttnam	United Kingdom
**1978** (32nd)	Star Wars	George Lucas	Gary Kurtz	United States
**1979** (33rd)	**Manhattan**	**Woody Allen**	**Charles H. Joffe**	**United States**
**1979** (33rd)	Apocalypse Now	Francis Coppola	Francis Coppola	United States
**1979** (33rd)	The China Syndrome	James Bridges	Michael Douglas	United States
**1979** (33rd)	The Deer Hunter †	Michael Cimino	Michael Cimino, Michael Deeley, John Peverall, Barry Spikings	United States

=== 1980s ===
Year	Film	Director(s)	Producer(s)	Country
**1980** (34th)	**The Elephant Man**	**David Lynch**	**Jonathan Sanger**	**United States**
**1980** (34th)	Being There	Hal Ashby	Andrew Braunsberg	United States
**1980** (34th)	Kagemusha (影武者, Kagemusha)	Akira Kurosawa	Akira Kurosawa	Japan
**1980** (34th)	Kramer vs. Kramer †	Robert Benton	Stanley R. Jaffe	United States
**1981** (35th)	**Chariots of Fire** †	**Hugh Hudson**	**David Puttnam**	**United Kingdom**
**1981** (35th)	Atlantic City	Louis Malle	Denis Héroux, John Kemeny	France; Canada; United States
**1981** (35th)	The French Lieutenant's Woman	Karel Reisz	Leon Clore	United Kingdom
**1981** (35th)	Gregory's Girl	Bill Forsyth	Davina Belling, Clive Parsons	United Kingdom
**1981** (35th)	Raiders of the Lost Ark	Steven Spielberg	Frank Marshall	United States
**1982** (36th)	**Gandhi** †	**Richard Attenborough**	**Richard Attenborough**	**United Kingdom**; **India**
**1982** (36th)	E.T. the Extra-Terrestrial	Steven Spielberg	Kathleen Kennedy, Steven Spielberg	United States
**1982** (36th)	Missing	Costa Gavras	Edward Lewis, Mildred Lewis	United States
**1982** (36th)	On Golden Pond	Mark Rydell	Bruce Gilbert	United States
**1983** (37th)	**Educating Rita**	**Lewis Gilbert**	**Lewis Gilbert**	**United Kingdom**
**1983** (37th)	Heat and Dust	James Ivory	Ismail Merchant	United Kingdom
**1983** (37th)	Local Hero	Bill Forsyth	David Puttnam	United Kingdom
**1983** (37th)	Tootsie	Sydney Pollack	Sydney Pollack, Dick Richards	United States
**1984** (38th)	**The Killing Fields**	**Roland Joffé**	**David Puttnam**	**United Kingdom**
**1984** (38th)	The Dresser	Peter Yates	Ronald Harwood, Peter Yates	United Kingdom
**1984** (38th)	Paris, Texas	Wim Wenders	Anatole Dauman, Don Guest	West Germany; France
**1984** (38th)	A Private Function	Malcolm Mowbray	Mark Shivas	United Kingdom
**1985** (39th)	**The Purple Rose of Cairo**	**Woody Allen**	**Robert Greenhut, Woody Allen**	**United States**
**1985** (39th)	Amadeus †	Miloš Forman	Saul Zaentz, Miloš Forman	United States
**1985** (39th)	Back to the Future	Robert Zemeckis	Neil Canton, Bob Gale, Robert Zemeckis	United States
**1985** (39th)	A Passage to India	David Lean	John Brabourne, Richard B. Goodwin, David Lean	United Kingdom
**1985** (39th)	Witness	Peter Weir	Edward S. Feldman, Peter Weir	United States
**1986** (40th)	**A Room with a View**	**James Ivory**	**Ismail Merchant, James Ivory**	**United Kingdom**
**1986** (40th)	Hannah and Her Sisters	Woody Allen	Robert Greenhut, Woody Allen	United States
**1986** (40th)	The Mission	Roland Joffé	Fernando Ghia, David Puttnam, Roland Joffé	United Kingdom
**1986** (40th)	Mona Lisa	Neil Jordan	Patrick Cassavetti, Stephen Woolley, Neil Jordan	United Kingdom
**1987** (41st)	**Jean de Florette**	**Claude Berri**	**Claude Berri**	**France**; **Switzerland**; **Italy**
**1987** (41st)	Cry Freedom	Richard Attenborough	Richard Attenborough	United Kingdom
**1987** (41st)	Hope and Glory	John Boorman	John Boorman	United Kingdom
**1987** (41st)	Radio Days	Woody Allen	Robert Greenhut	United States
**1988** (42nd)	**The Last Emperor** †	**Bernardo Bertolucci**	**Jeremy Thomas**, **Bernardo Bertolucci**	**United Kingdom**; **Italy**; **China**
**1988** (42nd)	Au revoir les enfants	Louis Malle	Louis Malle	France; West Germany
**1988** (42nd)	Babette's Feast	Gabriel Axel	Just Betzer, Bo Christensen	Denmark
**1988** (42nd)	A Fish Called Wanda	Charles Crichton	Michael Shamberg	United Kingdom; United States
**1989** (43rd)	**Dead Poets Society**	**Peter Weir**	**Steven Haft, Paul Junger Witt, Tony Thomas**	**United States**
**1989** (43rd)	My Left Foot	Jim Sheridan	Noel Pearson	Ireland
**1989** (43rd)	Shirley Valentine	Lewis Gilbert	Lewis Gilbert	United Kingdom
**1989** (43rd)	When Harry Met Sally...	Rob Reiner	Rob Reiner, Andrew Scheinman	United States

=== 1990s ===
Year	Film	Director(s)	Producer(s)	Country
**1990** (44th)	**Goodfellas**	**Martin Scorsese**	**Irwin Winkler**	**United States**
**1990** (44th)	Crimes and Misdemeanors	Woody Allen	Robert Greenhut	United States
**1990** (44th)	Driving Miss Daisy †	Bruce Beresford	Lili Fini Zanuck, Richard D. Zanuck	United States
**1990** (44th)	Pretty Woman	Garry Marshall	Arnon Milchan, Steven Reuther	United States
**1991** (45th)	**The Commitments**	**Alan Parker**	**Lynda Myles, Roger Randall-Cutler**	**Ireland**; **United Kingdom**
**1991** (45th)	Dances with Wolves †	Kevin Costner	Kevin Costner, Jim Wilson	United States
**1991** (45th)	The Silence of the Lambs †	Jonathan Demme	Ron Bozman, Edward Saxon, Kenneth Utt	United States
**1991** (45th)	Thelma & Louise	Ridley Scott	Mimi Polk Gitlin	United States
**1992** (46th)	**Howards End**	**James Ivory**	**Ismail Merchant**	**United Kingdom**
**1992** (46th)	The Crying Game	Neil Jordan	Stephen Woolley	United Kingdom; Ireland
**1992** (46th)	The Player	Robert Altman	David Brown, Michael Tolkin, Nick Wechsler	United States
**1992** (46th)	Strictly Ballroom	Baz Luhrmann	Tristram Miall	Australia
**1992** (46th)	Unforgiven †	Clint Eastwood	Clint Eastwood	United States
**1993** (47th)	**Schindler's List** †	**Steven Spielberg**	**Branko Lustig, Gerald R. Molen, Steven Spielberg**	**United States**
**1993** (47th)	The Piano	Jane Campion	Jan Chapman	New Zealand; Australia; France
**1993** (47th)	The Remains of the Day	James Ivory	John Calley, Ismail Merchant, Mike Nichols, James Ivory	United Kingdom; United States
**1993** (47th)	Shadowlands	Richard Attenborough	Richard Attenborough, Brian Eastman	United Kingdom
**1994** (48th)	**Four Weddings and a Funeral**	**Mike Newell**	**Duncan Kenworthy**	**United Kingdom**
**1994** (48th)	Forrest Gump †	Robert Zemeckis	Wendy Finerman, Steve Starkey, Steve Tisch	United States
**1994** (48th)	Pulp Fiction	Quentin Tarantino	Lawrence Bender	United States
**1994** (48th)	Quiz Show	Robert Redford	Michael Jacobs, Julian Krainin, Michael Nozik	United States
**1995** (49th)	**Sense and Sensibility**	**Ang Lee**	**Lindsay Doran**	**United Kingdom**
**1995** (49th)	Babe	Chris Noonan	Bill Miller, George Miller, Doug Mitchell	Australia; United States
**1995** (49th)	The Madness of King George	Nicholas Hytner	Stephen Evans, David Parfitt	United Kingdom
**1995** (49th)	The Usual Suspects	Bryan Singer	Michael McDonnell	United States
**1996** (50th)	**The English Patient** †	**Anthony Minghella**	**Saul Zaentz**	**United States**
**1996** (50th)	Fargo	Joel Coen	Ethan Coen	United States
**1996** (50th)	Secrets & Lies	Mike Leigh	Simon Channing-Williams	United Kingdom
**1996** (50th)	Shine	Scott Hicks	Jane Scott	Australia
**1997** (51st)	**The Full Monty**	**Peter Cattaneo**	**Uberto Pasolini**	**United Kingdom**
**1997** (51st)	L.A. Confidential	Curtis Hanson	Curtis Hanson, Arnon Milchan; Michael Nathanson	United States
**1997** (51st)	Mrs Brown	John Madden	Sarah Curtis	United Kingdom
**1997** (51st)	Titanic †	James Cameron	James Cameron, Jon Landau	United States
**1998** (52nd)	**Shakespeare in Love** †	**John Madden**	**Donna Gigliotti, Marc Norman, David Parfitt, Harvey Weinstein, Edward Zwick**	**United States**
**1998** (52nd)	Elizabeth	Shekhar Kapur	Tim Bevan, Eric Fellner, Alison Owen	United Kingdom
**1998** (52nd)	Saving Private Ryan	Steven Spielberg	Ian Bryce, Mark Gordon, Gary Levinsohn, Steven Spielberg	United States
**1998** (52nd)	The Truman Show	Peter Weir	Edward S. Feldman, Andrew Niccol, Scott Rudin, Adam Schroeder	United States
**1999** (53rd)	**American Beauty** †	**Sam Mendes**	**Bruce Cohen, Dan Jinks**	**United States**
**1999** (53rd)	East is East	Damien O'Donnell	Leslee Udwin	United Kingdom
**1999** (53rd)	The End of the Affair	Neil Jordan	Neil Jordan, Stephen Woolley	United Kingdom; United States
**1999** (53rd)	The Sixth Sense	M. Night Shyamalan	Frank Marshall, Kathleen Kennedy, Barry Mendel	United States
**1999** (53rd)	The Talented Mr. Ripley	Anthony Minghella	William Horberg, Tom Sternberg	United States

=== 2000s ===
Year	Film	Director(s)	Producer(s)	Country
**2000** (54th)	**Gladiator** †	**Ridley Scott**	**David Franzoni, Branko Lustig, Douglas Wick**	**United States**; **United Kingdom**
**2000** (54th)	Almost Famous	Cameron Crowe	Ian Bryce, Cameron Crowe	United States
**2000** (54th)	Billy Elliot	Stephen Daldry	Greg Brenman, Jon Finn	United Kingdom
**2000** (54th)	Crouching Tiger, Hidden Dragon (臥虎藏龍, Wò hǔ cáng lóng)	Ang Lee	Hsu Li-kong, Bill Kong, Ang Lee	Taiwan; China; Hong Kong
**2000** (54th)	Erin Brockovich	Steven Soderbergh	Danny DeVito, Michael Shamberg, Stacey Sher	United States
**2001** (55th)	**The Lord of the Rings: The Fellowship of the Ring**	**Peter Jackson**	**Peter Jackson, Barrie M. Osborne, Tim Sanders, Fran Walsh**	**New Zealand**; **United States**
**2001** (55th)	Amélie	Jean-Pierre Jeunet	Jean-Marc Deschamps, Claudie Ossard	France
**2001** (55th)	A Beautiful Mind †	Ron Howard	Brian Grazer, Ron Howard	United States
**2001** (55th)	Moulin Rouge!	Baz Luhrmann	Fred Baron, Martin Brown, Baz Luhrmann	Australia; United States
**2001** (55th)	Shrek	Andrew Adamson, Vicky Jenson	Jeffrey Katzenberg, Aron Warner, John H. Williams	United States
**2002** (56th)	**The Pianist**	**Roman Polanski**	**Robert Benmussa, Roman Polanski, Alain Sarde**	**France**; **Germany**; **United Kingdom**; **Poland**
**2002** (56th)	Chicago †	Rob Marshall	Martin Richards	United States
**2002** (56th)	Gangs of New York	Martin Scorsese	Alberto Grimaldi, Harvey Weinstein	United States
**2002** (56th)	The Hours	Stephen Daldry	Robert Fox, Scott Rudin	United States; United Kingdom
**2002** (56th)	The Lord of the Rings: The Two Towers	Peter Jackson	Peter Jackson, Barrie M. Osborne, Fran Walsh	New Zealand; United States
**2003** (57th)	**The Lord of the Rings: The Return of the King** †	**Peter Jackson**	**Peter Jackson, Barrie M. Osborne, Fran Walsh**	**New Zealand**; **United States**
**2003** (57th)	Big Fish	Tim Burton	Bruce Cohen, Dan Jinks, Richard D. Zanuck	United States
**2003** (57th)	Cold Mountain	Anthony Minghella	Albert Berger, William Horberg, Sydney Pollack, Ron Yerxa	United States; United Kingdom
**2003** (57th)	Lost in Translation	Sofia Coppola	Sofia Coppola, Ross Katz	United States
**2003** (57th)	Master and Commander: The Far Side of the World	Peter Weir	Samuel Goldwyn Jr., Duncan Henderson, Peter Weir	United States
**2004** (58th)	**The Aviator**	**Martin Scorsese**	**Sandy Climan, Charles Evans, Jr., Graham King, Michael Mann**	**United States**
**2004** (58th)	Eternal Sunshine of the Spotless Mind	Michel Gondry	Anthony Bregman, Steve Golin	United States
**2004** (58th)	Finding Neverland	Marc Forster	Nellie Bellflower, Richard N. Gladstein	United Kingdom; United States
**2004** (58th)	The Motorcycle Diaries (Diarios de motocicleta)	Walter Salles	Michael Nozik, Edgard Tenenbaum, Karen Tenkhoff	Argentina; Brazil
**2004** (58th)	Vera Drake	Mike Leigh	Simon Channing-Williams, Alain Sarde	United Kingdom
**2005** (59th)	**Brokeback Mountain**	**Ang Lee**	**Diana Ossana, James Schamus**	**United States**
**2005** (59th)	Capote	Bennett Miller	Caroline Baron, Michael Ohoven, William Vince	United States; Canada
**2005** (59th)	The Constant Gardener	Fernando Meirelles	Simon Channing Williams	United Kingdom
**2005** (59th)	Crash †	Paul Haggis	Don Cheadle, Cathy Schulman, Bob Yari	United States
**2005** (59th)	Good Night, and Good Luck	George Clooney	Grant Heslov	United States
**2006** (60th)	**The Queen**	**Stephen Frears**	**Tracey Seaward, Christine Langan, Andy Harries**	**United Kingdom**
**2006** (60th)	Babel	Alejandro González Iñárritu	Alejandro González Iñárritu, Jon Kilik, Steve Golin	United States; Mexico
**2006** (60th)	The Departed †	Martin Scorsese	Brad Pitt, Brad Grey, Graham King	United States
**2006** (60th)	The Last King of Scotland	Kevin Macdonald	Andrea Calderwood, Lisa Bryer, Charles Steel	United Kingdom
**2006** (60th)	Little Miss Sunshine	Jonathan Dayton, Valerie Faris	David T. Friendly, Peter Saraf, Marc Turtletaub	United States
**2007** (61st)	**Atonement**	**Joe Wright**	**Tim Bevan, Eric Fellner, Paul Webster**	**United Kingdom**
**2007** (61st)	American Gangster	Ridley Scott	Brian Grazer, Ridley Scott	United States
**2007** (61st)	The Lives of Others (Das Leben der Anderen)	Florian Henckel von Donnersmarck	Quirin Berg, Max Wiedemann	Germany
**2007** (61st)	No Country for Old Men †	Joel and Ethan Coen	Joel and Ethan Coen, Scott Rudin	United States
**2007** (61st)	There Will Be Blood	Paul Thomas Anderson	JoAnne Sellar, Daniel Lupi	United States
**2008** (62nd)	**Slumdog Millionaire** †	**Danny Boyle**	**Christian Colson**	**United Kingdom**
**2008** (62nd)	The Curious Case of Benjamin Button	David Fincher	Kathleen Kennedy, Frank Marshall, Ray Stark	United States
**2008** (62nd)	Frost/Nixon	Ron Howard	Ron Howard, Brian Grazer, Tim Bevan, Eric Fellner	United States; United Kingdom
**2008** (62nd)	Milk	Gus Van Sant	Dan Jinks, Bruce Cohen	United States
**2008** (62nd)	The Reader	Stephen Daldry	Anthony Minghella, Sydney Pollack, Scott Rudin	United States; Germany
**2009** (63rd)	**The Hurt Locker** †	**Kathryn Bigelow**	**Kathryn Bigelow, Mark Boal, Nicolas Chartier, Greg Shapiro**	**United States**
**2009** (63rd)	Avatar	James Cameron	James Cameron, Jon Landau	United States
**2009** (63rd)	An Education	Lone Scherfig	Finola Dwyer, Amanda Posey	United States; United Kingdom
**2009** (63rd)	Precious	Lee Daniels	Lee Daniels, Sarah Siegel-Magness, Gary Magness	United States
**2009** (63rd)	Up in the Air	Jason Reitman	Ivan Reitman, Jason Reitman, Daniel Dubiecki	United States

=== 2010s ===
Year	Film	Director(s)	Producer(s)	Country
**2010** (64th)	**The King's Speech** †	**Tom Hooper**	**Iain Canning, Emile Sherman, Gareth Unwin**	**United Kingdom**; **Australia**
**2010** (64th)	Black Swan	Darren Aronofsky	Darren Aronofsky, Scott Franklin, Mike Medavoy, Arnold Messer, Brian Oliver	United States
**2010** (64th)	Inception	Christopher Nolan	Christopher Nolan, Emma Thomas	United States; United Kingdom
**2010** (64th)	The Social Network	David Fincher	David Fincher, Scott Rudin, Dana Brunetti, Michael De Luca, Ceán Chaffin, Kevin Spacey	United States
**2010** (64th)	True Grit	Joel and Ethan Coen	Joel and Ethan Coen, Scott Rudin	United States
**2011** (65th)	**The Artist** †	**Michel Hazanavicius**	**Thomas Langmann**	**France**
**2011** (65th)	The Descendants	Alexander Payne	Alexander Payne, Jim Taylor, Jim Burke	United States
**2011** (65th)	Drive	Nicolas Winding Refn	Adam Siegel, Marc Platt	United States
**2011** (65th)	The Help	Tate Taylor	Brunson Green, Chris Columbus, Michael Barnathan	United States
**2011** (65th)	Tinker Tailor Soldier Spy	Tomas Alfredson	Tim Bevan, Robyn Slovo, Eric Fellner	United Kingdom France
**2012** (66th)	**Argo** †	**Ben Affleck**	**Grant Heslov, Ben Affleck, George Clooney**	**United States**
**2012** (66th)	Les Misérables	Tom Hooper	Tim Bevan, Eric Fellner, Debra Hayward, Cameron Mackintosh	United States; United Kingdom
**2012** (66th)	Life of Pi	Ang Lee	Gil Netter, Ang Lee, David Womark	United States; Canada
**2012** (66th)	Lincoln	Steven Spielberg	Steven Spielberg, Kathleen Kennedy	United States
**2012** (66th)	Zero Dark Thirty	Kathryn Bigelow	Mark Boal, Kathryn Bigelow, Megan Ellison	United States
**2013** (67th)	**12 Years a Slave** †	**Steve McQueen**	**Brad Pitt, Anthony Katagas, Dede Gardner, Jeremy Kleiner, Steve McQueen**	**United States**; **United Kingdom**
**2013** (67th)	American Hustle	David O. Russell	Charles Roven, Richard Suckle, Megan Ellison, Jonathan Gordon	United States
**2013** (67th)	Captain Phillips	Paul Greengrass	Scott Rudin, Dana Brunetti, Michael De Luca	United States
**2013** (67th)	Gravity	Alfonso Cuarón	Alfonso Cuarón, David Heyman	United States; United Kingdom
**2013** (67th)	Philomena	Stephen Frears	Gabrielle Tana, Steve Coogan, Tracey Seaward	United Kingdom
**2014** (68th)	**Boyhood**	**Richard Linklater**	**Richard Linklater, Cathleen Sutherland**	**United States**
**2014** (68th)	Birdman or (The Unexpected Virtue of Ignorance) †	Alejandro G. Iñárritu	Alejandro G. Iñárritu, John Lesher, James W. Skotchdopole	United States
**2014** (68th)	The Grand Budapest Hotel	Wes Anderson	Wes Anderson, Scott Rudin, Steven Rales, Jeremy Dawson	United States
**2014** (68th)	The Imitation Game	Morten Tyldum	Nora Grossman, Ido Ostrowsky, Teddy Schwarzman	United States
**2014** (68th)	The Theory of Everything	James Marsh	Tim Bevan, Eric Fellner, Lisa Bruce, Anthony McCarten	United Kingdom France
**2015** (69th)	**The Revenant**	**Alejandro G. Iñárritu**	**Steve Golin, Alejandro G. Iñárritu, Arnon Milchan, Mary Parent, Keith Redmon**	**United States**
**2015** (69th)	The Big Short	Adam McKay	Dede Gardner, Jeremy Kleiner, Brad Pitt	United States
**2015** (69th)	Bridge of Spies	Steven Spielberg	Kristie Macosko Krieger, Marc Platt, Steven Spielberg	United States
**2015** (69th)	Carol	Todd Haynes	Elizabeth Karlsen, Christine Vachon, Stephen Woolley	United Kingdom; United States
**2015** (69th)	Spotlight †	Tom McCarthy	Blye Pagon Faust, Steve Golin, Nicole Rocklin, Michael Sugar	United States
**2016** (70th)	**La La Land**	**Damien Chazelle**	**Fred Berger, Jordan Horowitz, Marc Platt**	**United States**
**2016** (70th)	Arrival	Denis Villeneuve	Dan Levine, Shawn Levy, David Linde, Aaron Ryder	United States
**2016** (70th)	I, Daniel Blake	Ken Loach	Rebecca O'Brien	United Kingdom
**2016** (70th)	Manchester by the Sea	Kenneth Lonergan	Lauren Beck, Matt Damon, Chris Moore, Kimberly Steward, Kevin J. Walsh	United States
**2016** (70th)	Moonlight †	Barry Jenkins	Dede Gardner, Jeremy Kleiner, Adele Romanski	United States
**2017** (71st)	**Three Billboards Outside Ebbing, Missouri**	**Martin McDonagh**	**Graham Broadbent, Pete Czernin, Martin McDonagh**	**United States**; **United Kingdom**
**2017** (71st)	Call Me by Your Name	Luca Guadagnino	Emilie Georges, Luca Guadagnino, Marco Morabito, Peter Spears	Italy; United States; France
**2017** (71st)	Darkest Hour	Joe Wright	Tim Bevan, Lisa Bruce, Eric Fellner, Anthony McCarten, Douglas Urbanski	United Kingdom
**2017** (71st)	Dunkirk	Christopher Nolan	Christopher Nolan, Emma Thomas	United Kingdom; United States
**2017** (71st)	The Shape of Water †	Guillermo del Toro	Guillermo del Toro, J. Miles Dale	United States
**2018** (72nd)	**Roma**	**Alfonso Cuarón**	**Alfonso Cuarón, Gabriela Rodriguez, Nicolas Celis**	**Mexico**
**2018** (72nd)	BlacKkKlansman	Spike Lee	Jason Blum, Spike Lee, Raymond Mansfield, Sean McKittrick, Jordan Peele, Shaun Redick	United States
**2018** (72nd)	The Favourite	Yorgos Lanthimos	Cecil Dempsey, Ed Guiney, Lee Magiday, Yorgos Lanthimos	United Kingdom; United States
**2018** (72nd)	Green Book †	Peter Farrelly	Jim Burke, Brian Hayes Currie, Peter Farrelly, Nick Vallelonga, Charles B. Wessler	United States
**2018** (72nd)	A Star is Born	Bradley Cooper	Bill Gerber, Lynette Howell Taylor	United States
**2019** (73rd)	**1917**	**Sam Mendes**	**Pippa Harris, Callum McDougall, Sam Mendes, Jayne-Ann Tenggren**	**United Kingdom**; **United States**
**2019** (73rd)	The Irishman	Martin Scorsese	Robert De Niro, Jane Rosenthal, Martin Scorsese, Emma Tillinger Koskoff	United States
**2019** (73rd)	Joker	Todd Phillips	Bradley Cooper, Todd Phillips, Emma Tillinger Koskoff	United States
**2019** (73rd)	Once Upon a Time in Hollywood	Quentin Tarantino	David Heyman, Shannon McIntosh, Quentin Tarantino	United States; United Kingdom
**2019** (73rd)	Parasite (기생충, Gisaengchung) †	Bong Joon-ho	Bong Joon-ho, Kwak Sin-ae	South Korea

=== 2020s ===
Year	Film	Director(s)	Producer(s)	Country
**2020** (74th)	**Nomadland** †	**Chloé Zhao**	**Frances McDormand, Peter Spears, Mollye Asher, Dan Janvey, Chloé Zhao**	**United States**
**2020** (74th)	The Father	Florian Zeller	David Parfitt, Jean-Louis Livi, Philippe Carcassonne	United Kingdom
**2020** (74th)	The Mauritanian	Kevin Macdonald	Adam Ackland, Leah Clarke, Christine Holder, Beatriz Levin, Lloyd Levin	United Kingdom; United States
**2020** (74th)	Promising Young Woman	Emerald Fennell	Josey McNamara, Ben Browning, Ashley Fox, Emerald Fennell	United Kingdom; United States
**2020** (74th)	The Trial of the Chicago 7	Aaron Sorkin	Stuart M. Besser, Marc Platt	United States
**2021** (75th)	**The Power of the Dog**	**Jane Campion**	**Jane Campion, Iain Canning, Roger Frappier, Tanya Seghatchian, Emile Sherman**	**Australia**; **New Zealand**; **United States**; **United Kingdom**; **Canada**
**2021** (75th)	Belfast	Kenneth Branagh	Laura Berwick, Kenneth Branagh, Becca Kovacik, Tamar Thomas	United Kingdom
**2021** (75th)	Don't Look Up	Adam McKay	Adam McKay, Kevin Messick	United States
**2021** (75th)	Dune	Denis Villeneuve	Mary Parent, Cayle Boyter, Denis Villeneuve	United States
**2021** (75th)	Licorice Pizza	Paul Thomas Anderson	Sara Murphy, Paul Thomas Anderson, Adam Somner	United States; Canada
**2022** (76th)	**All Quiet on the Western Front** (Im Westen nichts Neues)	**Edward Berger**	**Malte Grunert**	**Germany**
**2022** (76th)	The Banshees of Inisherin	Martin McDonagh	Graham Broadbent, Peter Czernin, Martin McDonagh	Ireland; United Kingdom; United States
**2022** (76th)	Elvis	Baz Luhrmann	Gail Berman, Baz Luhrmann, Catherine Martin, Patrick McCormick, Schuyler Weiss	Australia; United States
**2022** (76th)	Everything Everywhere All at Once †	Daniel Kwan, Daniel Scheinert	Daniel Kwan, Daniel Scheinert, Jonathan Wang	United States
**2022** (76th)	Tár	Todd Field	Todd Field, Scott Lambert, Alexandra Milchan	United States; Germany
**2023** (77th)	**Oppenheimer** †	**Christopher Nolan**	**Emma Thomas, Charles Roven, Christopher Nolan**	**United States**
**2023** (77th)	Anatomy of a Fall (Anatomie d'une chute)	Justine Triet	Marie-Ange Luciani, David Thion	France
**2023** (77th)	The Holdovers	Alexander Payne	Mark Johnson, Bill Block, David Hemingson	United States
**2023** (77th)	Killers of the Flower Moon	Martin Scorsese	Dan Friedkin, Bradley Thomas, Martin Scorsese, Daniel Lupi	United States
**2023** (77th)	Poor Things	Yorgos Lanthimos	Ed Guiney, Andrew Lowe, Yorgos Lanthimos, Emma Stone	Ireland; United Kingdom; United States
**2024** (78th)	**Conclave**	**Edward Berger**	**Tessa Ross, Juliette Howell, Michael A. Jackman**	**United Kingdom**; **United States**
**2024** (78th)	Anora †	Sean Baker	Alex Coco, Samantha Quan, Sean Baker	United States
**2024** (78th)	The Brutalist	Brady Corbet	Nick Gordon, Brian Young, Andrew Morrison, D.J. Gugenheim, Brady Corbet	Hungary; United Kingdom; United States
**2024** (78th)	A Complete Unknown	James Mangold	Fred Berger, Alex Heineman, James Mangold	United States
**2024** (78th)	Emilia Pérez	Jacques Audiard	Pascal Caucheteux, Jacques Audiard	France
**2025** (79th)	**One Battle After Another** †	**Paul Thomas Anderson**	**Adam Somner (p.n.), Sara Murphy, Paul Thomas Anderson**	**United States**
**2025** (79th)	Hamnet	Chloé Zhao	Liza Marshall, Pippa Harris, Nicolas Gonda, Steven Spielberg, Sam Mendes	United Kingdom; United States
**2025** (79th)	Marty Supreme	Josh Safdie	Eli Bush, Ronald Bronstein, Josh Safdie, Anthony Katagas, Timothée Chalamet	United States
**2025** (79th)	Sentimental Value	Joachim Trier	Maria Ekerhovd, Andrea Berentsen Ottmar	Norway; France; Germany; Denmark; Sweden; United Kingdom
**2025** (79th)	Sinners	Ryan Coogler	Zinzi Coogler, Sev Ohanian, Ryan Coogler	United States

== Longlist finalists ==
As of the 77th ceremony, the finalists are selected by the voting members during the first round. The Round Two voting determine the nominations. These are the additional films that appeared in the longlist.

Year	Finalists	Ref.
2009	District 9; Gran Torino; Inglourious Basterds; Invictus; Moon; The Road; A Serious Man; A Single Man; Star Trek; Up	
2010	127 Hours; Another Year; The Fighter; The Girl With The Dragon Tattoo; The Kids Are All Right; Made In Dagenham; Shutter Island; The Town; Toy Story 3; Winter's Bone	
2011	The Girl with the Dragon Tattoo; Hugo; The Ides of March; The Iron Lady; Midnight in Paris; Moneyball; My Week with Marilyn; Senna; War Horse; We Need to Talk About Kevin	
2020	Another Round; Da 5 Bloods; The Dig; Ma Rainey's Black Bottom; Mank; News of the World; One Night in Miami...; Soul; Sound of Metal; The White Tiger	
2021	Being the Ricardos; CODA; The French Dispatch; House of Gucci; King Richard; The Lost Daughter; No Time to Die; tick, tick... BOOM!; The Tragedy of Macbeth; West Side Story	
2022	Aftersun; The Fabelmans; Living; Top Gun: Maverick; Triangle of Sadness	
2023	All of Us Strangers; Barbie; Maestro; Past Lives; The Zone of Interest	
2024	The Apprentice; Dune: Part Two; Kneecap; The Substance; Wicked	
2025	The Ballad of Wallis Island; Bugonia; Frankenstein; I Swear; Nuremberg	

== See also ==
- Academy Award for Best Picture
- Critics' Choice Movie Award for Best Picture
- Golden Globe Award for Best Motion Picture – Drama
- Golden Globe Award for Best Motion Picture – Musical or Comedy
- Guldbagge Award for Best Film
- Producers Guild of America Award for Best Theatrical Motion Picture
- Screen Actors Guild Award for Outstanding Performance by a Cast in a Motion Picture
