= Jerzy Toeplitz =

Polish film educator

- Born: 24 November 1909; Kharkiv, Kharkov Governorate, Russian Empire
- Died: 24 July 1995 (aged 85); Warsaw, Poland
- Occupations: Film educator, theorist
- Known for: Co-founder of the Polish Film School

Jerzy Bonawentura Toeplitz AO (24 November 1909 – 24 July 1995) was a Polish film educator and theorist. He was a co-founder of the national film school in Łódź, Poland, now known as now known as Łódź Film School, which had a significant impact on Polish cinema, as well as foundation director of the Australian Film, Television and Radio School (AFTRS) in Sydney in 1973, which has been the training ground for many of Australia's most well-known filmmakers.

== Early life and education ==
Jerzy Bonawentura Toeplitz was born on 24 November 1909 in Kharkov (Kharkiv), then in the Russian Empire, now in Ukraine. He was one of four children of social activist and town planner Teodor Toeplitz and his wife Halina (née Odrzywolska), who were Jewish. In 1910 the family moved to Warsaw in 1910, where Teodor became a member of the Warsaw city council in 1919.

Toeplitz studied law at the University of Warsaw, graduation with a Master of Laws in 1933, but never practised in the legal profession. In 1930 he co-founded the Society for the Promotion of Film Art, an experimental group that used film to express political views.

== Career ==
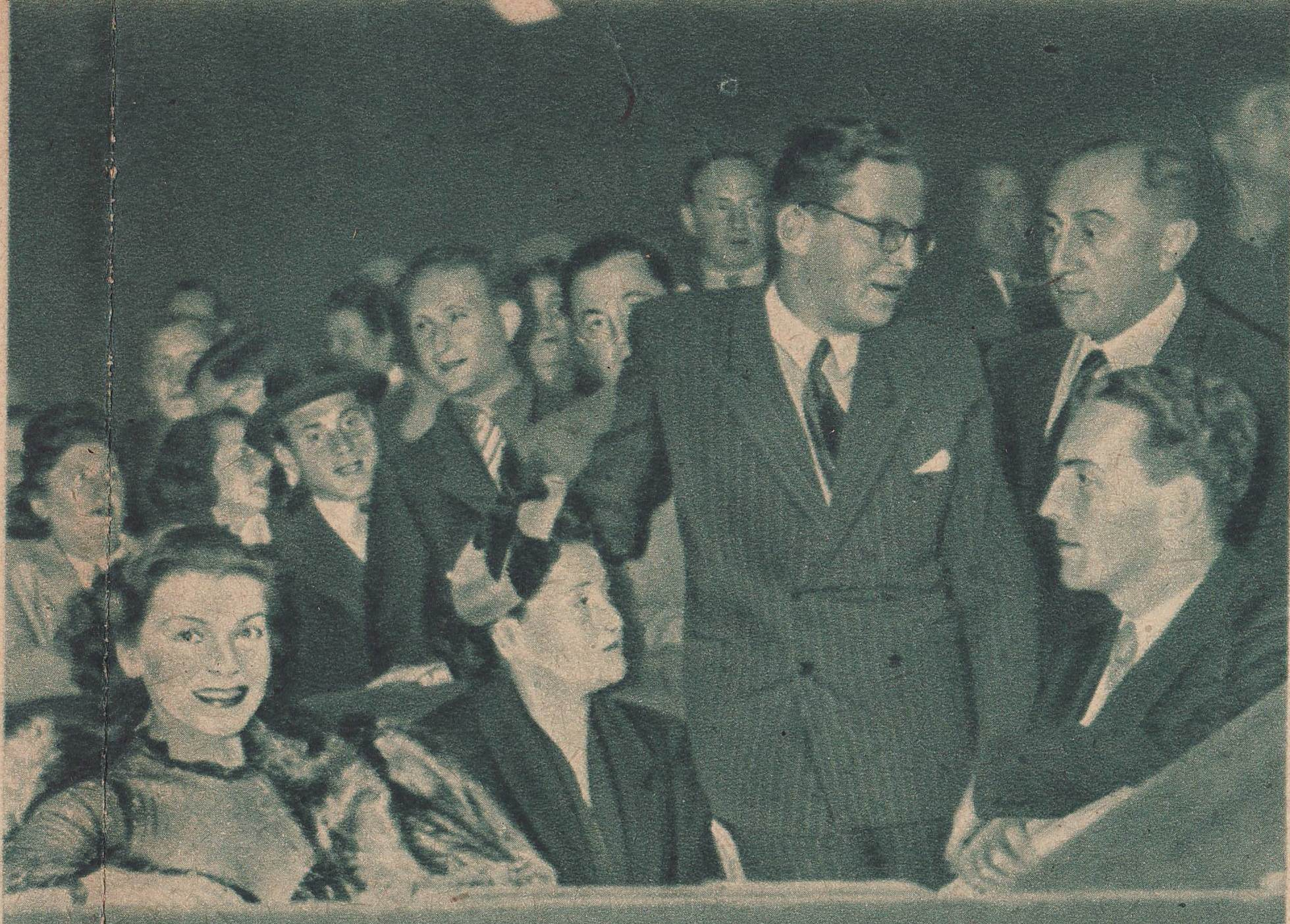
Barbara Drapińska and Jerzy Toeplitz during opening night for "The Last Stage" in Paris, 1948

During the 1930s, Toeplitz wrote film reviews, and also directed several leftist films, including The Loves of a Dictator (1935) and The Beloved Vagabond (1936).

In 1945, Film Polski was established as the sole body producing and distributing films in Poland, and Toeplitz became head of scriptwriting. From then on, he initiated the founding of a national Polish film school, and in 1947, was one of the co-founders of the national film school in Poland, now known as Łódź Film School. Other founding professors were Jerzy Bossak, Wanda Jakubowska, Stanisław Wohl, and Antoni Bohdziewicz. Topelitz was a professor from 1948 until 1968, and director from 1949 to 1952 (when he was temporarily removed for expressing unpopular political views) and then rector from 1957 to 1968. He left the post in 1968, along with many other teachers, owing to political persecution after supporting protesting students. In 1967 Toeplitz was a visiting professor at the University of California, Los Angeles (UCLA).

From 1968 to 1972 Toeplitz was director of the film section at the Institute of Art in the Polish Academy of Sciences in Warsaw, a government institution. and was also director of the Polish Film Corporation.

In 1970 he was headhunted by Australian writer and broadcaster Phillip Adams and polymath and politician Barry Jones, who were campaigning for the establishment of a government-supported film school in Sydney. The British head of UCLA's department of theatre arts, Colin Young, had recommended Toeplitz to Adams and Jones, and he visited Australia as a consultant at the end of 1970 for three weeks. He was appointed founding director of the new national Film and Television School in Sydney (later the Australian Film, Television and Radio School, or AFTRS), by prime minister Gough Whitlam effective in February 1973. In December 1972, he was visiting professor at La Trobe University in Melbourne.

He retired from AFTRS in 1979 and returned to Poland.

== Other activities ==
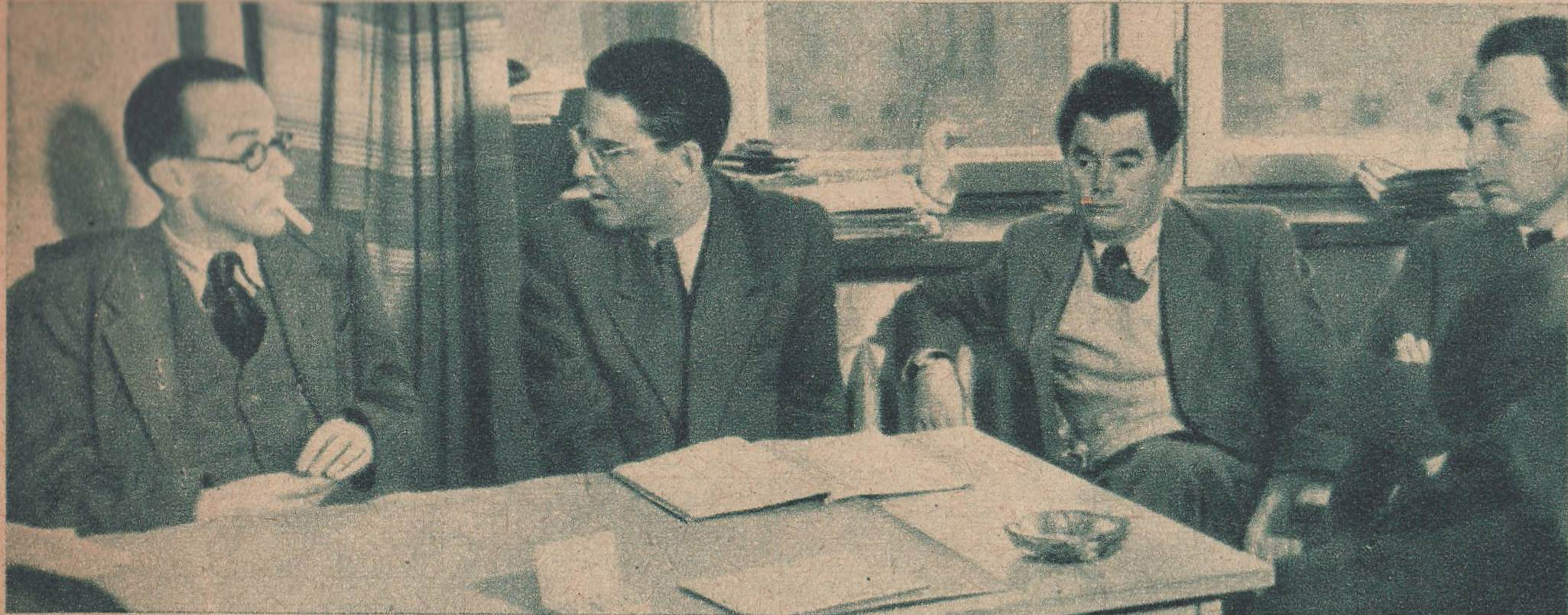
Conference of the World Union of Documentary Films Warsaw: (L-R) Basil Wright, Elmar Klos, Joris Ivens, and Jerzy Toeplitz, 1948

Toeplitz was general editor of Film Quarterly and Cinema.

From 1946 or 1948 until 1972, Topelitz was chairman of the International Federation of Film Archives (FIAF).

He was vice-chairman of UNESCO's International Film and Television Council from 1966 until 1972, and vice-chairman of CILECT, the International Association of Film Schools, from 1976 to 1979.

=== Film juries ===
Toeplitz served on the juries of many major film awards.

In 1959, he was a member of the jury at the 1st Moscow International Film Festival, and again officiated at the 2nd Moscow International Film Festival in 1961.

In 1960 he served on the jury of the 21st Venice International Film Festival.

In December 1972 he served on the jury for the Australian Film Institute Awards (AFI Awards), and in 1978 he was a member of the jury of Warringah Shire Council's Second National Youth Film Festival, along with Chris Noonan and Michael Pate.

In 1986, he was a member of the jury at the 36th Berlin International Film Festival.

Toeplitz also wrote and published a number of books, which have been translated into many languages.

== Recognition and honours ==
In 1974, Jacquelene Rees, writing in The Canberra Times, wrote that Toeplitz is "generally accredited with having laid the basis of the 1950s renascence of Polish cinema through his brave and innovatory administration" as well as being "an eminent teacher, historian, and international film juror".

In 1979, the Australian Film Institute awarded its Raymond Longford Award to Toeplitz.

In May 1985 Toeplitz was appointed an honorary Officer of the Order of Australia, for service to Australian film and television.

On 3 March 1993 he was awarded an honorary doctorate by Lodz Film School.

In 1998, the AFTRS library was named Jerzy Toeplitz Library. At the time of Toeplitz's departure, the library held over 5,000 video titles, scripts, and screenplays, along with books and periodicals. It was/is the largest film library in the southern hemisphere.

== Personal life ==
Toeplitz married Izabella Gornicka in 1943, and with World War II imminent, both feared that, as Polish Jews, they would die. They had three daughters, who survived him along with his wife.

His brother was a journalist known as "K.T." (Krzysztof Teodor Toeplitz), who was very critical of the regime in Poland.

== Death and legacy ==
Toeplitz died on 24 July 1995.

Lodz Film School had a decisive impact on the modern cinema of Poland. Toeplitz played a key role in developing the curriculum, with the school later producing filmmakers like Roman Polanski and Jerzy Skolimowski.

His impact on the new generation of filmmakers who were trained at AFTRS was also immense, starting with Gillian Armstrong, Philip Noyce, Chris Noonan, and Jane Campion, to name a few.

== Selected publications ==
- History of Cinematographic Art (1955-89), in six volumes
- Hollywood and After: The Changing Face of American Cinema (1973)
