= The Sea (1933 film) =

1933 film

- Directed by: Wanda Jakubowska; Stanisław Wohl; Jerzy Zarzycki
- Produced by: Edmund Byczynski
- Narrated by: Gayne Whitman
- Release date: 7 May 1933
- Running time: 9 minutes
- Country: Poland
- Language: Polish

The Sea (Polish: Morze) is a 1933 Polish short documentary film directed by Wanda Jakubowska. It was nominated for an Academy Award in 1933 for Best Short Subject (Novelty).

== Cast ==
- Gayne Whitman as Narrator (USA version)
