= Alina Janowska =

Polish actress

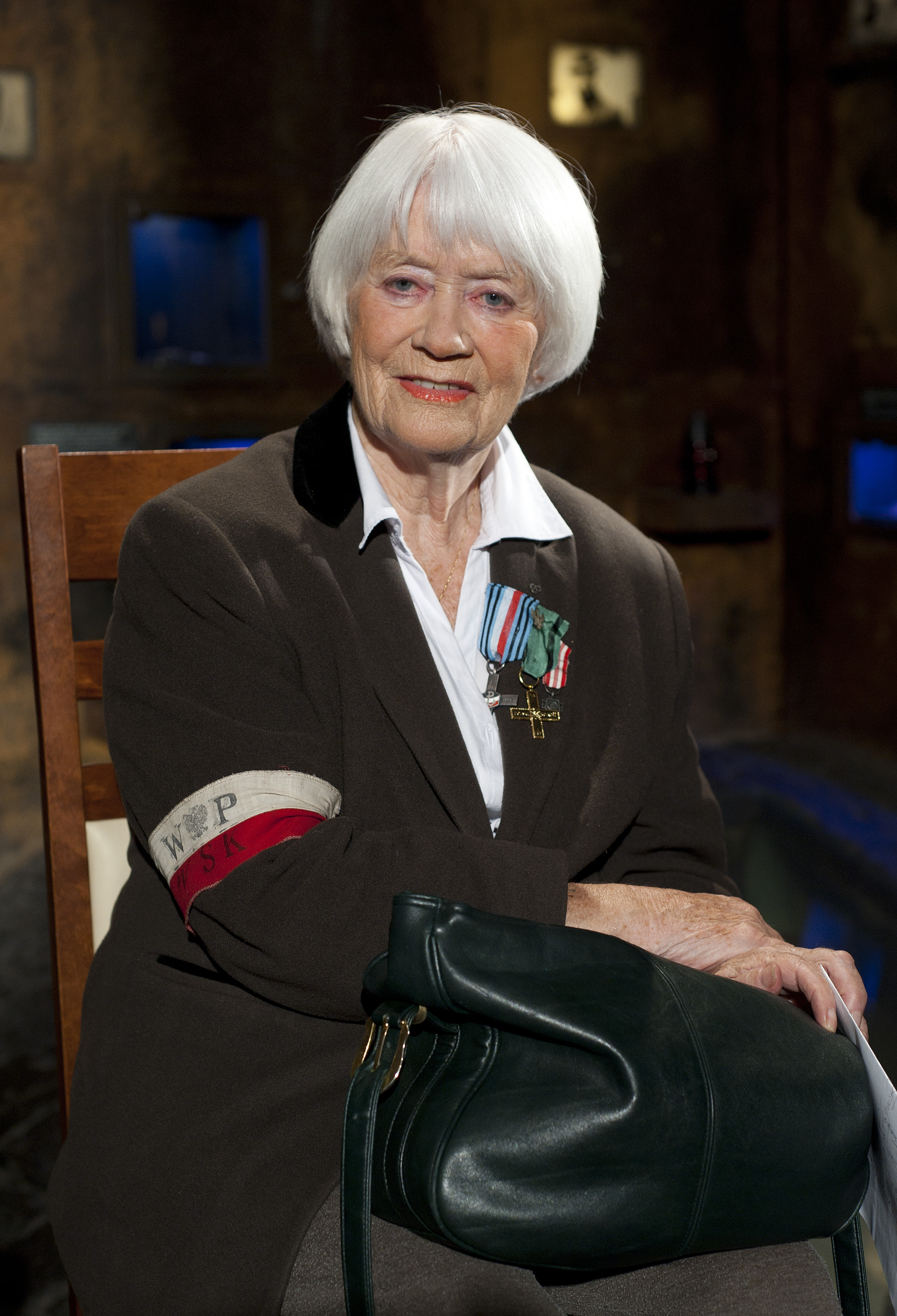
- Alina Janowska during the 66th anniversary of outbreak of the Warsaw Uprising at Warsaw Uprising Museum in Warsaw
- Born: 16 April 1923; Warsaw, Poland
- Died: 13 November 2017 (aged 94); Warsaw, Poland
- Occupation: Actress
- Years active: 1943–2013
- Spouses: Andrzej Borecki (m. 1954; div. 1963) Wojciech Zabłocki (m. 1963)
- Children: 3
- Relatives: Zofia Rabcewicz (great-aunt)

Alina Janowska (16 April 1923 – 13 November 2017) was a Polish actress. She appeared in more than 35 films and television shows between 1946 and 2017.

== Biography ==
Janowska was born in 1923 in Warsaw into a wealthy family. She was arrested on the night of 23 April 1942, accused of collaborating with the underground and helping a Jewish family. She was imprisoned for 7 months in Pawiak in Warsaw. She took part in the Warsaw Uprising, acting as a liaison officer for the Battalion "Kiliński".

In 1963 she married Polish architect and fencer Wojciech Zabłocki. The couple had two children. She has had a daughter from her first marriage.

== Career ==
She debuted in theatre in 1943. From 1945 to 1965 she was employed in the Warsaw theater Teatr Syrena. Later she played in Zakazane piosenki (1946), the first Polish film after World War II.

In the 1940s she acted in movies, such as Treasure (dir. by Leonard Buczkowski). Her most important role from this period was the Yugoslav Dessa in The Last Stage (1947) directed by Wanda Jakubowska. The film was nominated for the Grand International Award at the Venice Film Festival in 1948, and for a BAFTA Award for Best Film from any Source in 1950.

In the early 1950s she disappeared from the screens and stages to take care of her family. She only dubbed in a few Polish-language version Soviet films. After eleven years, she returned to the cinema. She played the main character Lucyna in Samson (1961) directed by Andrzej Wajda. The film was nominated for a Golden Lion in 1961 at the Venice Film Festival. In the same year she dubbed Drizella in a Polish-language version of Cinderella. In the years 1965-1966 she appeared in the popular TV series Wojna domowa. From 1966 to 1981 she was employed in the Polish Teatr Komedia w Warszawie. From 1997 to 2010 she played in soap opera Złotopolscy as Eleonora Gabriel. From 2010 to 2011 she played in Plebania.

Alina Janowska died on 13 November 2017, aged 94, from Alzheimer's disease.

== Filmography ==
Year	Title	Role	Director	Notes
1946	Zakazane piosenki	Singer	Leonard Buczkowski	First Polish film after World War II
1947	The Last Stage	Dessa	Wanda Jakubowska	
1948	Treasure	Basia	Leonard Buczkowski	
1948	Ślepy tor	Ewka		Premiere after 45 years
1949	Czarci żleb	Hanka	Tadeusz Kański	
1961	Samson	Lucyna	Andrzej Wajda	
1963	Smarkula	Dr. Wanda	Leonard Buczkowski	
1965–1966	Wojna domowa	Irena Kaminska	Jerzy Gruza	TV series
1968	Stawka większa niż życie	Rose Arens		1 episode
1970	Dzięcioł	Misia	Jerzy Gruza	
1971	Podróż za jeden uśmiech	Aunt Ula	Stanisław Jędryka	Film and series
1975	Dulscy	Aniela Dulska	Jan Rybkowski	
1976	Czterdziestolatek	Celina	Jerzy Gruza	TV series
1985	Och, Karol	Karol's mother-in-law	Roman Załuski	
1990	Femina	Bogna's mother	Piotr Szulkin	Nominated - Award for Female Supporting Role in Gdynia Film Festival
1991	V.I.P.	Greboszowa	Juliusz Machulski	
1991	Calls Controlled	Halina Należyty	Sylwester Chęciński	
1997–2010	Złotopolscy	Eleonora Gabriel		TV series, circa 1,000 episodes
2007	Niania	Leokadia	Yurek Bogayevicz	Sitcom, 1 episode
2008	Niezawodny system	Maria	Izabela Szylko	Monaco International Film Festival Award for Best Actress; Zimbabwe International Film Festival Award for Best Actress
2010–2011	Plebania	Adela		TV series
2011	Na dobre i na złe	Lidia Makowska	Kordian Piwowarski	1 episode
2013	Zdjęcie od Nasierowskiej, czyli życie wielokrotnie spełnione	Herself		Documentary
