= 3rd British Academy Film Awards =

1950 film awards ceremony

- Date: 29 May 1950

Highlights
- Best Film: Bicycle Thieves
- Best British Film: The Third Man
- Most awards: Bicycle Thieves, The Third Man (1)
- Most nominations: The Third Man (2)

The 3rd British Academy Film Awards, known retroactively as the British Academy Film Awards, were given by the British Academy of Film and Television Arts (BAFTA) (known then as the British Film Academy) on 29 May 1950, and honoured the best films of 1948 and 1949. The awards for Best British Film and Best Film from any Source was handed out to The Third Man and Bicycle Thieves, respectively, and The Third Man was the most nominated feature film, with two.

== Winners and nominees ==
The Third Man and Bicycle Thieves received the awards for Best British Film and Best Film from any Source, respectively, and The Third Man received a further nomination in the latter category; Daybreak in Udi received the award for Best Documentary; French education film, La Famille Martin received the Special Award; and The Search received the United Nations Award.

Winners are listed first and highlighted in boldface; the nominees are listed below alphabetically and not in boldface.

Best British Film	Best Film from any Source
**The Third Man**; A Run for Your Money; Kind Hearts and Coronets; Passport to Pimlico; The Queen of Spades; The Small Back Room; Whisky Galore!	**Bicycle Thieves (Italy)**; The Ballad of Berlin (Germany); The Last Stage (Poland); The Set-Up (United States); The Third Man (United Kingdom); The Treasure of the Sierra Madre (United States); The Window (United States)
Best Documentary	Special Award
**Daybreak in Udi**; Circulation; The Cornish Engine; Drug Addict; Island of the Lagoon; The Liver Fluke in Great Britain; Report on the Refugee Problem	**La Famille Martin** (French education film); Accidents Don't Happen, No. 5; Dots and Loops (Canadian experimental animation); A Fly About the House; Legend of Saint Ursula; Tale About a Soldier
United Nations Award
**The Search** (feature film, United States); Au Carrefour de la Vie (Crossroads of Life) (documentary drama, Belgium); Daybreak in Udi (documentary film, United Kingdom); The People Between (documentary, Canada); Sardinia Project (documentary, Italy)

== See also ==
- 7th Golden Globe Awards
- 22nd Academy Awards
