= Samson (1961 Polish film) =

- Directed by: Andrzej Wajda
- Written by: Kazimierz Brandys; Andrzej Wajda
- Produced by: Hal B. Wallis
- Starring: Serge Merlin; Alina Janowska
- Music by: Tadeusz Baird
- Production company: KADR
- Release date: 11 September 1961
- Running time: 117 minutes
- Country: Poland
- Language: Polish

Samson is a 1961 Polish film directed by Andrzej Wajda that uses art house aesthetics to tell a story about the Holocaust. Wajda's World War II film alludes to the Old Testament story of Samson, who had supernatural physical strength. But unlike the Biblical character, Wajda's Samson has great emotional strength.

== Plot ==
A dark coming-of-age film, Samson follows its Jewish protagonist (Serge Merlin) from an antisemitic private school to a prison, then into a Jewish ghetto, and finally over the ghetto wall to the outside world. Wajda uses this journey as a means to explore expressionist cinematography and the weighty issues facing the Jewish people.

The construction of the Jewish ghetto is communicated through a single, stationary shot. A shabbily dressed mass is clustered in front of the camera, and a pair of hands with a hammer and nails secures one board at a time, until the shot of people has been replaced with a shot of a wall. Through minimalism and simplicity, Wadja establishes a separation between the world of the impoverished Jew and the world outside the ghetto. The viewer looking on as the ghetto walls block the view of what happening inside, is made to feel detached from the horror inside.

One question Wajda raises is that of Jewish solidarity and the guilt of being saved while one's brethren are suffering. Samson escapes from the Jewish ghetto but immediately wants to return. Although he could enjoy a comfortable life of cocktails and women, he'd rather be in the ghetto, collecting corpses off the streets. Samson argues that his place is with the Jews, that he should suffer alongside them. A fake-blond beauty offers a different take. She confides to Samson that she's Jewish and has been concealing her roots in order to avoid the ghetto. Although she argues passionately, Samson's emotional strength inevitably inspires her to accept her fate as a Jew.

When Samson is bruised and exhausted, lying on the ground, he is encouraged by a close friend who says, "one man can suffer such blows and rise again." For Wajda, this is the greatness displayed in Jewish history. Samson is a scrawny, haggard young man, who says very little and might almost border on boringly average; but he has the ability to rise again despite any blow, proving his strength of spirit.

== Production ==
Of Samson, Wajda wrote,

On first reading Kazimierz Brandys's novel Samson, I remembered the drawings by Gustave Doré I had seen as a child, and I started dreaming of making a modern film version of the great Biblical tale. What the novel demanded of a director, however, was simplicity, modesty and, above all, respect for details. From the first day of shooting to the final day of editing, I remained torn between the two extremes. As veterans of Ashes and Diamonds both of us, Jerzy Wójcik and myself, realized the power of narrative shortcuts and the impact of symbolism on the screen. We wanted to continue in that direction. Brandys' novel, however, contradicted and desperately resisted our concepts.

== Reception ==
Georges Sadoul of Les Lettres Françaises, Paris, wrote in 1964, "In its first part, the film is a masterpiece. Never before has Wajda revealed such virtuosity. He has not succumbed to the temptation of formal exercise. Far from any baroque mannerism, he says what he has to say firmly, even brutally, while using a minimum of effects, in shades nearly classical. This style present throughout the film reveals a great talent on the threshold of maturity."

Konrad Eberhardt of Film, Warsaw, wrote in September 1961, "No attempt has been made to discuss this new offer, so different from Wajda's previous works, in terms of creative, rather than propaganda merits, or the author's intentions and the values which the film contributes to our cinematography."

== Cast ==
- Serge Merlin as Jakub Gold
- Alina Janowska as Lucyna
- Elżbieta Kępińska as Kazia, Malina's Niece
- Jan Ciecierski as Józef Malina
- Tadeusz Bartosik as Pankrat
- Władysław Kowalski as Fialka
- Irena Netto as Jakub's Mother
- Beata Tyszkiewicz as Stasia
- Jan Ibel as Genio
- Bogumil Antczak as Prisoner
- Edmund Fetting as Guest at Lucyna's Party
- Roland Głowacki as Guest at Lucyna's Party
- Andrzej Herder as Gestapo Officer
- Zygmunt Hübner as Gestapo Officer
- Zofia Jamry as Woman Blackmailing Malina

== Awards ==
- Nominated for a Golden Lion in 1961 at the Venice Film Festival

== See also ==
- The Fifth Horseman Is Fear
