= Marian Brandys =

Polish writer and screenwriter

Marian Brandys (25 January 1912 – 20 November 1998) was a Polish writer and screenwriter born in Wiesbaden into an assimilated Jewish family of the Polish intelligentsia. Brandys grew up in Łódź. His father, Henryk Brandys, owned a bank. Their prosperity allowed Marian, and his younger brother, Kazimierz, to attend the best private school for boys, sponsored by the city's merchants' club, Zgromadzenie Kupców Miasta Łodzi.

In 1935, during the Second Polish Republic, Brandys graduated in Law from Warsaw University and worked in the courts before the 1939 invasion of Poland. He took part in the September Campaign as the commander of a mounted platoon of machine guns for the Independent Operational Group Polesie led by General Franciszek Kleeberg. Brandys spent the war years incarcerated in the German Woldenberg II-C prisoner of war camp for Polish officers near the town of Grünberg in Schlesien, present day Zielona Góra. He joined the Polish communist party upon the Soviet takeover of Poland and from 1949 worked as a reporter in Warsaw. Brandys published his first book during the Stalinist era, the propagandist Początek opowieści (The Beginning of a Story) about the factory workers of Nowa Huta. After the fall of Stalinism, he focused on writing historical novels and children's books. He left the communist party in 1966. He was the elder brother of the far more popular Polish writer, Kazimierz Brandys, author of Miasto niepokonane (Unconquered City) about the two Warsaw Uprisings during World War II. He died in Warsaw in 1998.
