= Kazimierz Brandys =

Polish writer and academic (1916–2000)

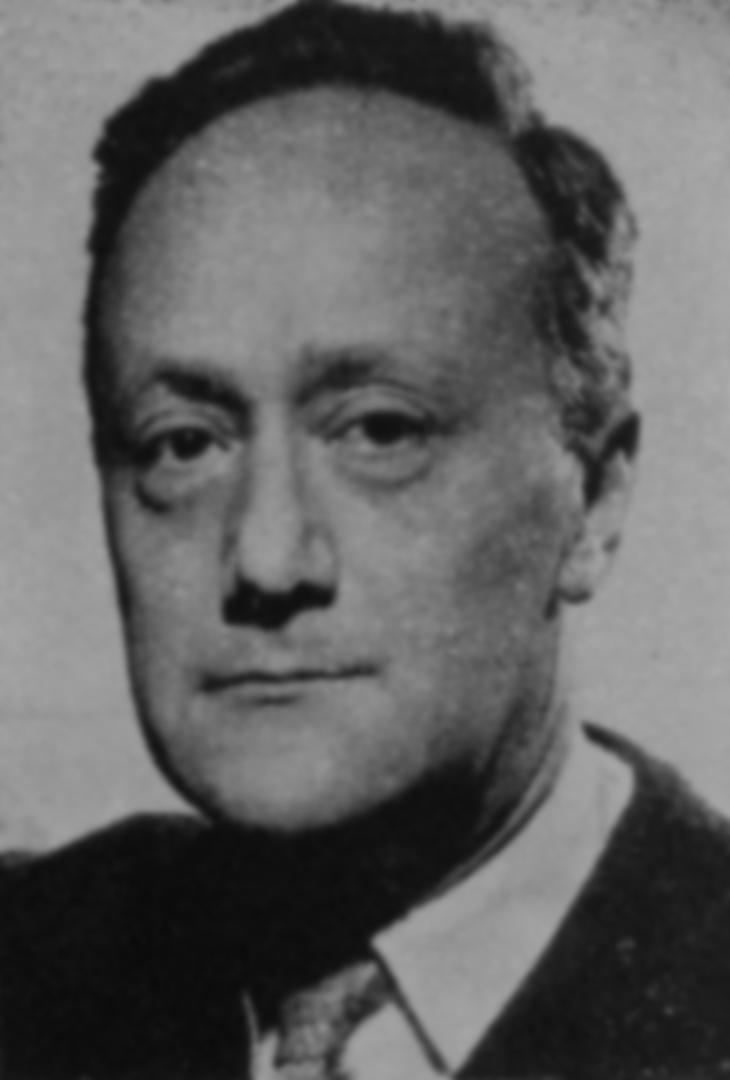
- Kazimierz Brandys
- Born: 27 October 1916; Łódź
- Died: 11 March 2000 (aged 83); Nanterre
- Occupation: Writer

Kazimierz Brandys (27 October 1916 – 11 March 2000) was a Polish novelist, essayist and screenwriter.

== Biography ==
Kazimierz Brandys was born in Łódź, the son of Henryk Brandys, merchant and financier, and Eugenia née Landau. He was the brother of the writer Marian Brandys and husband of the translator Maria Zenowicz. He graduated in law from the University of Warsaw in 1939. He was first published in 1935 as a Theatre Critic, in the literary monthly Kuźnia Młodych (Anvil of Youth). Between 1945 and 1950 he was a member of the editorial board of the weekly Kuźnica (The Smithy).

In 1946 he joined the Polish Workers' Party; in 1949 he joined Polish United Workers' Party. His literary career took off with the publication of his account of the two Warsaw uprisings during World War II. From 1956 onwards he was the spokesman for the Polish communist party's programme of "renewal" and "moral cleansing". Between 1950 and 1960 he was on the editorial board of the weekly Nowa Kultura (New Culture).

In 1966 he left the communist party as a protest against the political persecution of Leszek Kołakowski. In 1970 and 1971 he taught Slavonics at the Sorbonne. In 1976 he signed the Letter of 59, protesting against changes to the constitution of the People's Republic of Poland. Between 1977 and 1980 he was on the editorial board of Zapis (The Record).

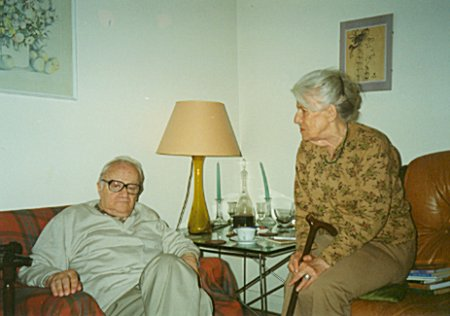
Kazimierz Brandys and Maria Zenowicz-Brandys in Paris (1998)

In December 1981 he moved outside Poland, first to the United States, then to Paris, where he held radio broadcast in the Radio France Internationale. He died in 2000, in Paris.

== Selected bibliography ==
- Drewniany koń (The Wooden horse), Warsaw: Czytelnik, 1946.
- Miasto niepokonane, 1946.
- Między wojnami (Between the Wars):
  - Samson, Warsaw: Czytelnik, 1948.
  - Antygona (Antigone), Warsaw: Czytelnik, 1948.
  - Troja, miasto otwarte (Troy: open city), Warsaw: Czytelnik, 1949.
  - Człowiek nie umiera (Man does not die), Warsaw: Czytelnik, 1951.
- Obywatele (Citizens), Warsaw: Czytelnik, 1954.
- Matka Królów (Mother of Kings), Warsaw: Czytelnik, 1957.
- Romantyczność (Romance), stories, Warsaw: Czytelnik, 1960.
- Sposób bycia (Ways of being), Warsaw: Czytelnik, 1963.
- Jak być kochaną i inne opowiadania (How to be Loved and Other Stories), Warsaw: Czytelnik, 1970.
- Wariacje pocztowe (Postal variations), Warsaw: Czytelnik, 1972.
- Pomysł (An Idea), Warsaw: PIW, 1974.
- Nierzeczywistość (Unreality), Warsaw: NOWA, 1977.
- Rondo, Warsaw: Czytelnik, 1982.

=== Memoirs, journals, essays ===
- Miesiące (Months), Warsaw-Paris: Instytut Literacki, 1978–1987.
- Sztuka konwersacji (The Art of conversation), London: Aneks, 1990.
- Charaktery i pisma (Characters and scripts), London: Aneks, 1991.
- Zapamiętane (Remembered), Cracow: WL, 1995.
- Przygody Robinsona (Robinson's adventures), Warsaw: Iskry, 1999.

== Filmography, as screenwriter ==
- Samson (1961)
- Jak być kochaną (1962)
- Sposób bycia (1965)
- Bardzo starzy oboje (1967)
- Spokojne lata (1981)
- Matka Królów (1982)

== Bibliography ==
- Wołk, Marcin (2017). "Kazimierz Brandys i prawda pojedyncza" (PDF). Archiwum Emigracji. Studia – Szkice – Dokumenty. 24–25 (1–2). Toruń. Archived from the original (PDF) on 1 July 2026.
