= Charles Steel =

British Army officer and civil servant

- Born: 29 May 1901; Leominster, Herefordshire
- Died: 7 February 1993 (aged 91) Nettlebed, Henley-on-Thames, Oxfordshire
- Allegiance: United Kingdom
- Branch: British Army
- Service years: 1921-1961
- Rank: Brigadier
- Service number: 14744
- Conflicts: Second World War
- Awards: CMG, OBE

Brigadier Charles Deane Steel CMG OBE (29 May 1901 − 7 February 1993) was a British Army officer and civil servant.

== Military career ==
Charles Steel was the son of Dr Gerard Steel, JP (1865-1937) and was educated at Bedford School between 1912 and 1919. He attended the Royal Military Academy, Woolwich between 1919 and 1921, at which he was awarded the Prize Cadetship (1919) and the Armstrong Memorial Prize (1921). He was commissioned into the Royal Engineers on 13 July 1921.

Between 1924 and 1919 he served in India with the Bengal Sappers and Miners. He was promoted to the rank of captain on 13 July 1932 and attended the Staff College, Camberley (1936-7), being promoted to the rank of major on 1 August 1938.

During the Second World War he served in East Africa and Abyssinia between 1941 and 1942. He was made an Officer of the Order of the British Empire in the 1941 New Year Honours. Steel was deployed to the Western Desert where he was Mentioned in Dispatches on 24 June 1943. He was captured later that year, but subsequently escaped to Switzerland. He was Mentioned in Dispatches for a second time for "services in the field" on 8 November 1945.

Between 1945 and 1949 Steel was Deputy Head of the British Military Mission to Greece and was promoted to the rank of lieutenant-colonel in 1947. Between 1952 and 1964 he worked as Head of the Conference and Supply Department at the Foreign and Commonwealth Office and he was invested as a Companion of the Order of St Michael and St George in 1957. He was made an honorary brigadier on 15 February 1952 and retired from the Regular Army Reserve of Officers in 1961. Steel was Head of the Accommodation Department in Her Majesty's Diplomatic Service between 1965 and 1967.

On 9 April 1932 he married Elizabeth, daughter of Colonel Lawrence Chenevix-Trench and Winifred Ross Tootal, and together they had two sons.
