= Gerda Schneider =

German communist (born 1900)

- Born: 27 March 1900
- Citizenship: German
- Notable work: Resistance movement in Auschwitz, The Last Stage (1948)

Gerda Schneider (Gertrud, Gertrude; born 27 March 1900) was a German communist who was imprisoned by Nazi Germany beginning from 1933 until 1945 and co-author of The Last Stage with Wanda Jakubowska.

== Biography ==
From 1937 to 1939, she was a political prisoner at the Lichtenburg concentration camp. On 26 May 1939, she was among 900 women transported from Lichtenburg to Ravensbrück. On 26 March 1942 she was transferred to Auschwitz, with the first transport of female prisoners from the Ravensbrück concentration camp. Gerda Schneider received the camp number 586 and became a Blockälteste.

Prisoners’ testimonies stress her role as an active member of the resistance and her work as Blockälteste in the camp “infirmary” (quarters for the sick). In a conversation with Stuart Liebman, Wanda Jakubowska stated that although Schneider was sent to Auschwitz to “organize a camp for women,” she was nevertheless “still a decent person. She organized what was best for women.” More former inmates, including Genowefa Ułan, supported this claim and gave evidence that Schneider used her position to help fellow sufferers. According to Jerzy Ptakowski, the women's section of the Auschwitz Combat Group was initiated by the French communist Danielle Casanova, who was helped by Wanda Jakubowska and Gerda Schneider, among others. She was mentioned by Henryk Świebocki as an activist in the Rajsko subcamp. Schneider, however, used to beat fellow inmates and, according to the testimony of Antonina “Tośka” Piątkowska, poured out the herbs needed by the sick. According to the testimony of Józefa Kiwalowa, in 1944 Gerda Schneider was sent to Birkenau.

The information about her imprisonment held at the Auschwitz-Birkenau State Museum was described as “brief and fragmentary”.

After the liberation, Wanda Jakubowska and Gerda Schneider spent several months in the Soviet Zone in Berlin, where they looked for materials related to their film project and also helped the Soviets with Russian-German translations.

According to film's crew, including Jerzy Kawalerowicz, Gerda Schneider co-directed the film with Jakubowska, not only co-written it. Jakubowska and Schneider worked with a group of German prisoners of war. One of film's characters, German political prisoner and communist Anna, was modeled on Gerda Schneider.

== Bibliography ==
- Schneider, Gerda. “Die ‘Positiven’ und die ‘Negativen.’ Gerda Schneider uber ihre Drehbucharbeit an dem Auschwitz-Film Die letzte Etappe.” Neues Deutschland (18 August 1949): 3.
