= The Last Stage =

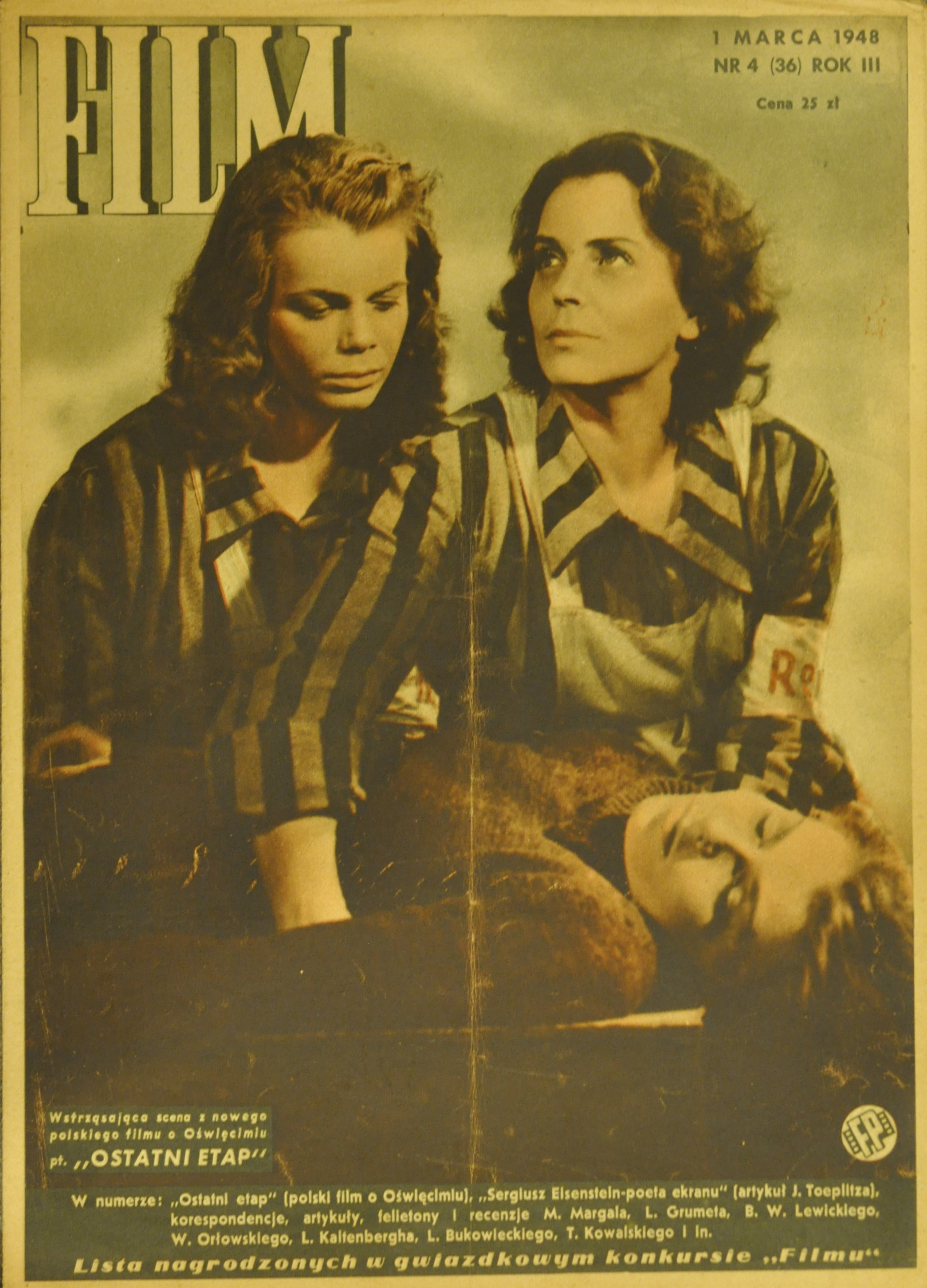
- Front cover of Polish Film Magazine Nr. 36 with actors from the movie "The Last Stage"
- Directed by: Wanda Jakubowska
- Written by: Wanda Jakubowska; Gerda Schneider
- Starring: Barbara Drapińska
- Cinematography: Bentsion Monastyrsky
- Distributed by: Film Polski
- Release date: 28 March 1948 (Poland)
- Running time: 81 min. / 110 min. (US)
- Country: Poland
- Languages: Polish, German, Russian

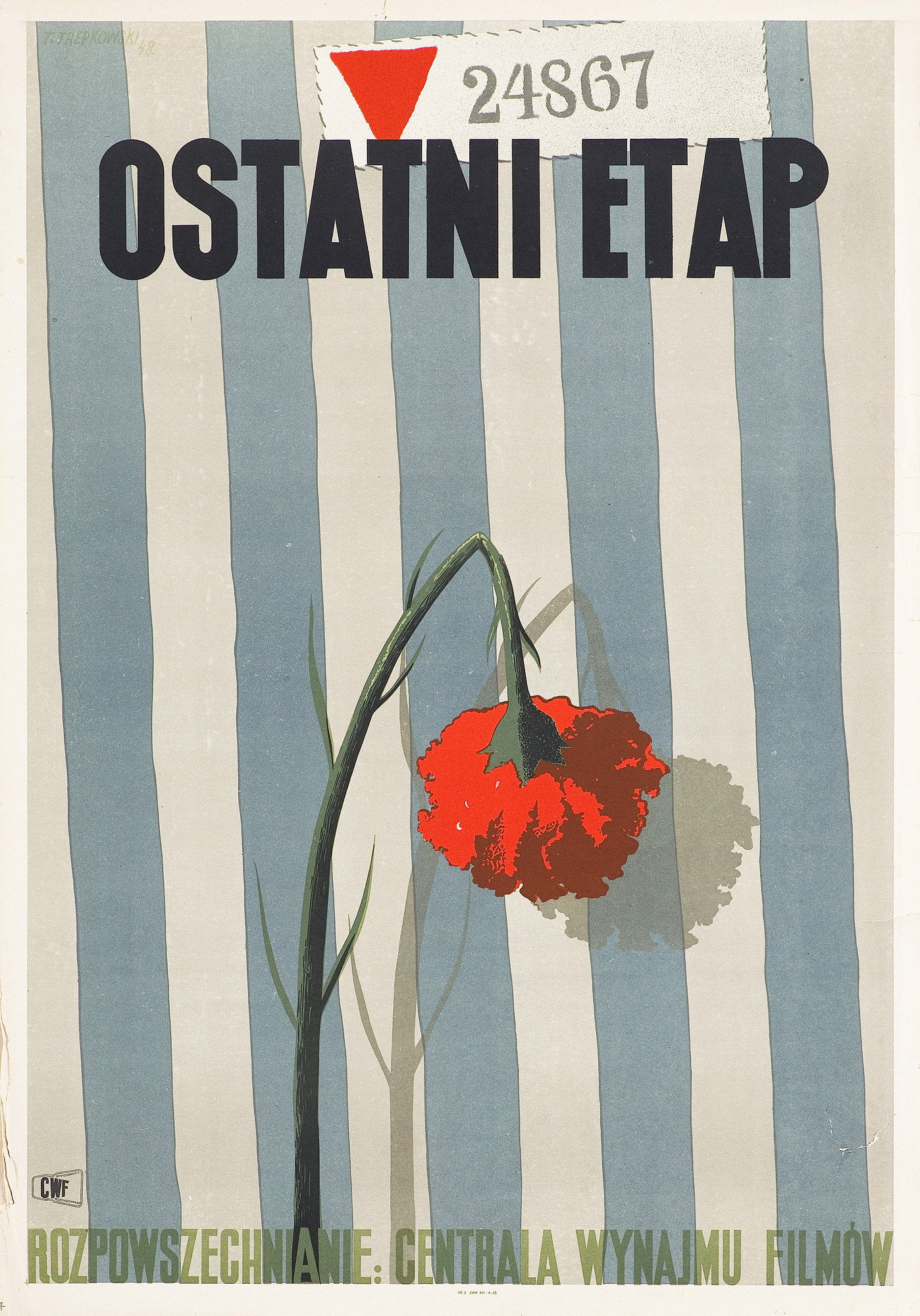
Original movie poster by Tadeusz Trepkowski

The Last Stage (Polish: Ostatni etap) is a 1948 Polish historical drama film directed by Wanda Jakubowska and written by Jakubowska and Gerda Schneider, depicting her experiences in the Auschwitz concentration camp during World War II. The film was one of the early cinematic efforts to describe the Holocaust. Jakubowska’s film influenced subsequent directors that dealt with the subject, including Alain Resnais, Gillo Pontecorvo and Steven Spielberg. In film criticism, it is often referred to as "the mother of all holocaust films".

It was Jakubowska's first theatrically-released film and was both a commercial and critical success. It was seen by more than 7.8 million people in Poland and exported to dozens of countries. It also was nominated for a BAFTA Award for Best Film from Any Source in 1950.

== Plot ==
Marta Weiss (Barbara Drapińska), a Polish Jew, arrives by cattle car to the Auschwitz concentration camp. While there, she catches the attention of the guards as she is multilingual and is put to work as a translator. When she inquires about the factory at the camp, a fellow inmate informs her that it is a crematorium and that the rest of her family likely has been murdered. The character Marta Weiss is based on the true life of Mala Zimetbaum.

In the barracks, many of the women are dying and ill. Eugenia, a prisoner and doctor, tries her best to minister to them but is unable to do much as supplies are limited. The women learn that an international commission is coming to the camp to observe the conditions of the prisoners. Eugenia learns a few key phrases in German and is able to tell the observers that everything they see is a lie and people are dying. Unfortunately the commanders tell the observers that Eugenia is mentally ill. Later they torture her to find out who taught her the German phrases but Eugenia refuses to tell them and is murdered.

Eugenia is replaced by Lalunia, a Polish woman who claims to have been rounded up by mistake and who says she is a doctor though she is actually only a pharmacist's wife. However rather than administer medicine to the women of the camp she distributes them among the Kapos in exchange for luxuries like clothes and perfume. The nurses' aide searches her room and confiscates the remaining medicine. Lalunia later turns the aide in and has her killed after discovering messages she had written that the Russians were advancing.

Meanwhile, Marta is able to temporarily escape in order to smuggle information about the camps to a resistance broadcaster. When she is returned to the camp, she is tortured and then sentenced to death by hanging. A prisoner frees her wrists and hands her a knife before she is to die, and she tells the camp that the Russians are coming and slashes the face of the Nazi commander who tortured her. Before the guards can retaliate, planes are heard overhead, and Marta realizes that the Russians have come to liberate them.

== Production ==
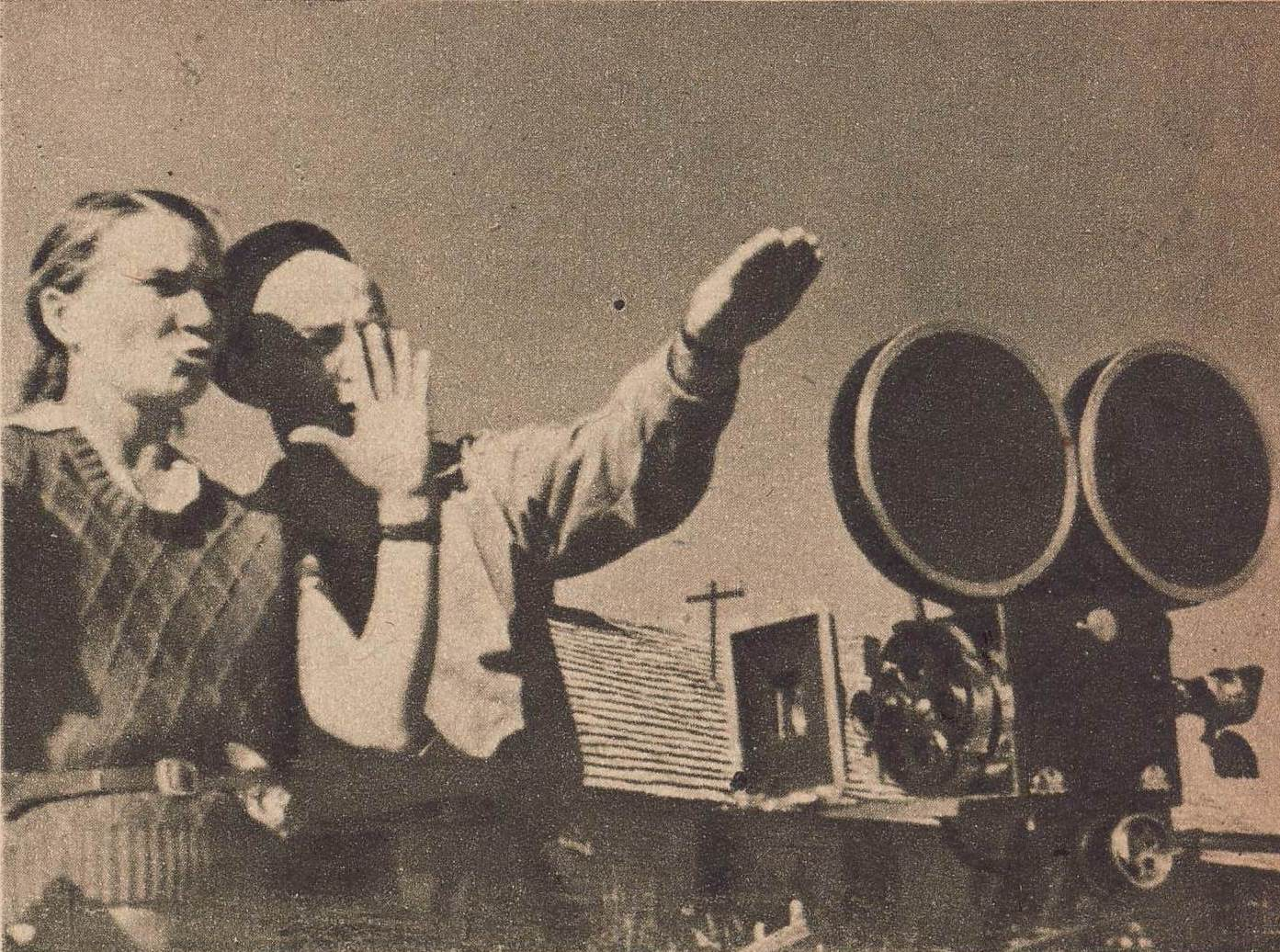
Director, Wanda Jakubowska with cinematographer, Bentsion Monastyrsky during filming on 1 November 1947

The film was written by Jakubowska and Gerda Schneider, also an Auschwitz survivor. Jakubowska initially thought about creating a film documenting her experience at Auschwitz while she was still an inmate at the camp: "The decision to make a film about Auschwitz originated as soon as I crossed the camp's gate." Upon her release from the camp she immediately began to work on a script and had completed a first draft by December 1945. As a survivor, she felt it was her duty and as a director to bear witness and register the magnitude of evil. In 1946 she travelled to Moscow with a filmic novella of the script translated into Russian and met with Mikhail Kalatozov, who was then responsible for Soviet cinema. Deeply moved, Kalatozov passed on the novella to Andrei Zhdanov. Zhdanov was deeply affected and sent the novella to Joseph Stalin. Stalin's personal approval and the Soviet blessing made it possible for Jakubowska to make the film. Film Polski still required script revisions and sought input from writers, outsiders, political activists and former Auschwitz inmates.

The film is both set and filmed at Auschwitz and it was made with the participation of local inhabitants of Oświęcim, Red Army personnel and German prisoners of war as extras. Several of the actresses were former inmates of the camp themselves. Jerzy Kawalerowicz, an assistant director on the film said that these women "were wiser than all assistant directors; they knew everything from experience. They saw it. Those former inmates were returning to their places." Czeslaw Piaskowski, the co-set designer, was also a concentration camp survivor. Jakubowska restored part of the camp for filming and the film crew stayed in the former SS quarters, with Jakubowska staying at the former home of Rudolf Höss.

== Cast ==
- Barbara Drapińska as Marta Weiss, a Jewish Polish interpreter
- Wanda Bartówna as Helena
- Alina Janowska as Dessa, a Serb POW
- Maria Vinogradova as Nadya
- Tatyana Guretskaya as Eugenia, a Russian physician
- Stanislaw Zaczyk as Tadek
- Edward Dziewonski as Auschwitz Medical Officer
- Antonina Gordon-Górecka as Anna, a German nurse
- Huguette Faget as Michele, a French patriot
- Aleksandra Śląska as Superintendent of the Women's Block
- Stefan Sródka as Bronek
- Barbara Fijewska as Anielka, replacement nurse
- Halina Drohocka as Lalunia, replacement doctor
- Anna Lutoslawska as Urzsula
- Zofia Mrozowska as Gypsy singer
- Barbara Rachwalska as Elsa
- Maria Kaniewska as Record-keeper
- Anna Jaraczówna as Frida, a Capo

== Reception ==
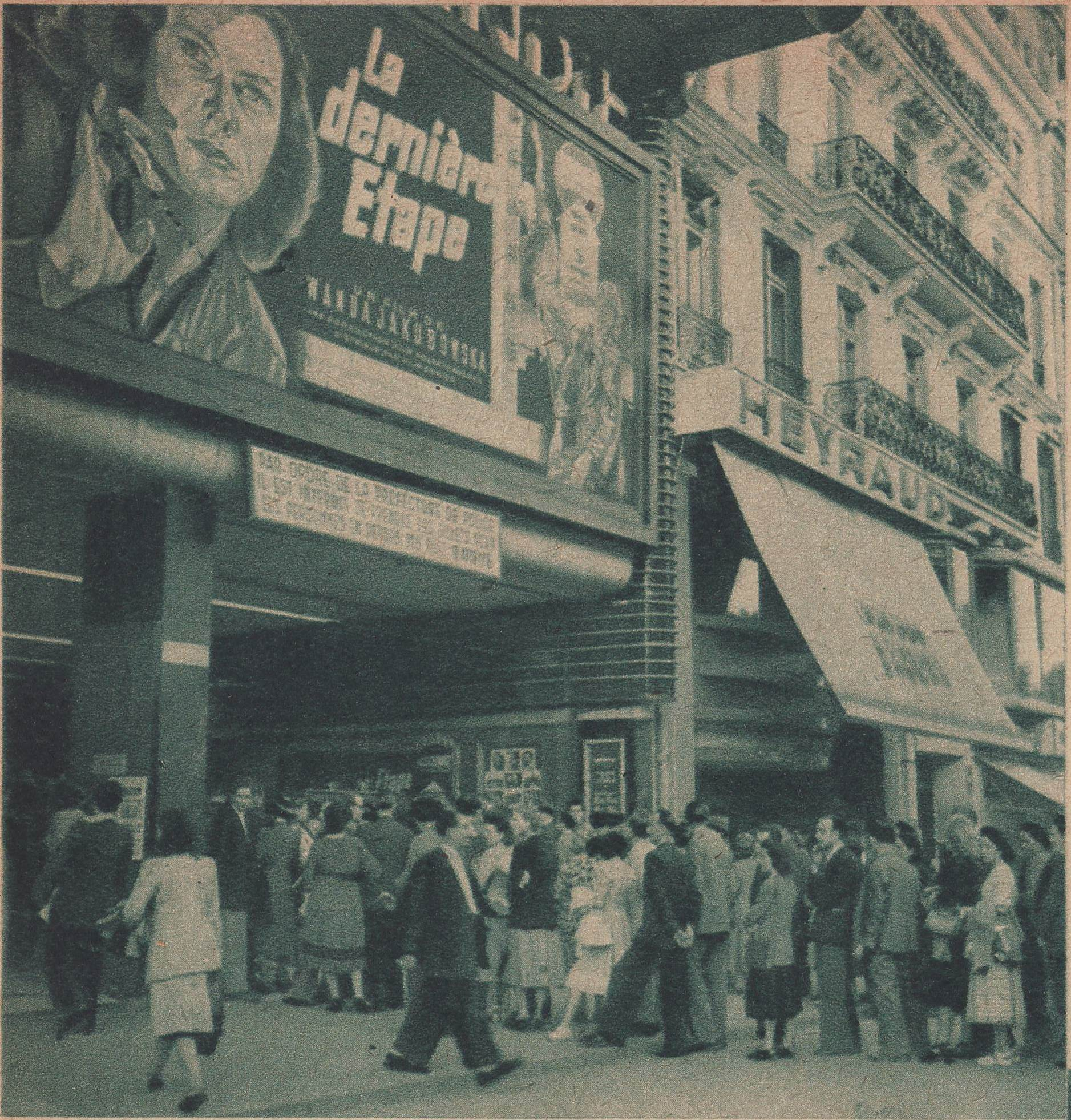
The film's premiere in Paris on 23 December 1948

The film won the Crystal Globe at Karlovy Vary International Film Festival in 1948, and it was nominated for Grand International Award at Venice Film Festival in 1948 and for a BAFTA Award for Best Film from Any Source in 1950. It was reviewed by Bosley Crowther for The New York Times in 1949: "...this latest import from Europe is a stark and uncompromising film... it carries a powerful comprehension of the shame and pathos of one of history's darkest hours." In 1996, Stephen Holden also wrote about the film in The New York Times: "Bleaker and more terrifying than "Schindler's List," this inky, nightmarish film has the atmosphere of a horror movie up until its sentimental ending." In the introduction to Jakubowska's published script, Jerzy Toeplitz wrote: "The value of the film lies in the ideological stand of its maker, who put her great talent and all her strength into the effort to fight fascism, to unmask its genocidal method."

Film critic Peter Bradshaw gave the film a five star review in 2023 in The Guardian upon its release on streaming platform, Mubi. Bradshaw wrote: "The Last Stage is a forthright, vehement film with a confident and almost Hollywoodised way of portraying the nightmare, but with a distinctive emphasis on the leftist Polish patriots and their defiant plan to resist. The existence of the gas chambers themselves is casually, in fact bloodfreezingly, invoked, though they are not in direct sight...The Last Stage is essential both as a film and historical document." In the same year it was described as a "masterpiece" by Sight and Sound magazine: "The Last Stage accords respect and dignity to the prisoners, shows them as complex human beings, puts them at the centre of the narrative."
