= Stanisław Wohl =

Film director, screenwriter and cinematographer (1912–1985)

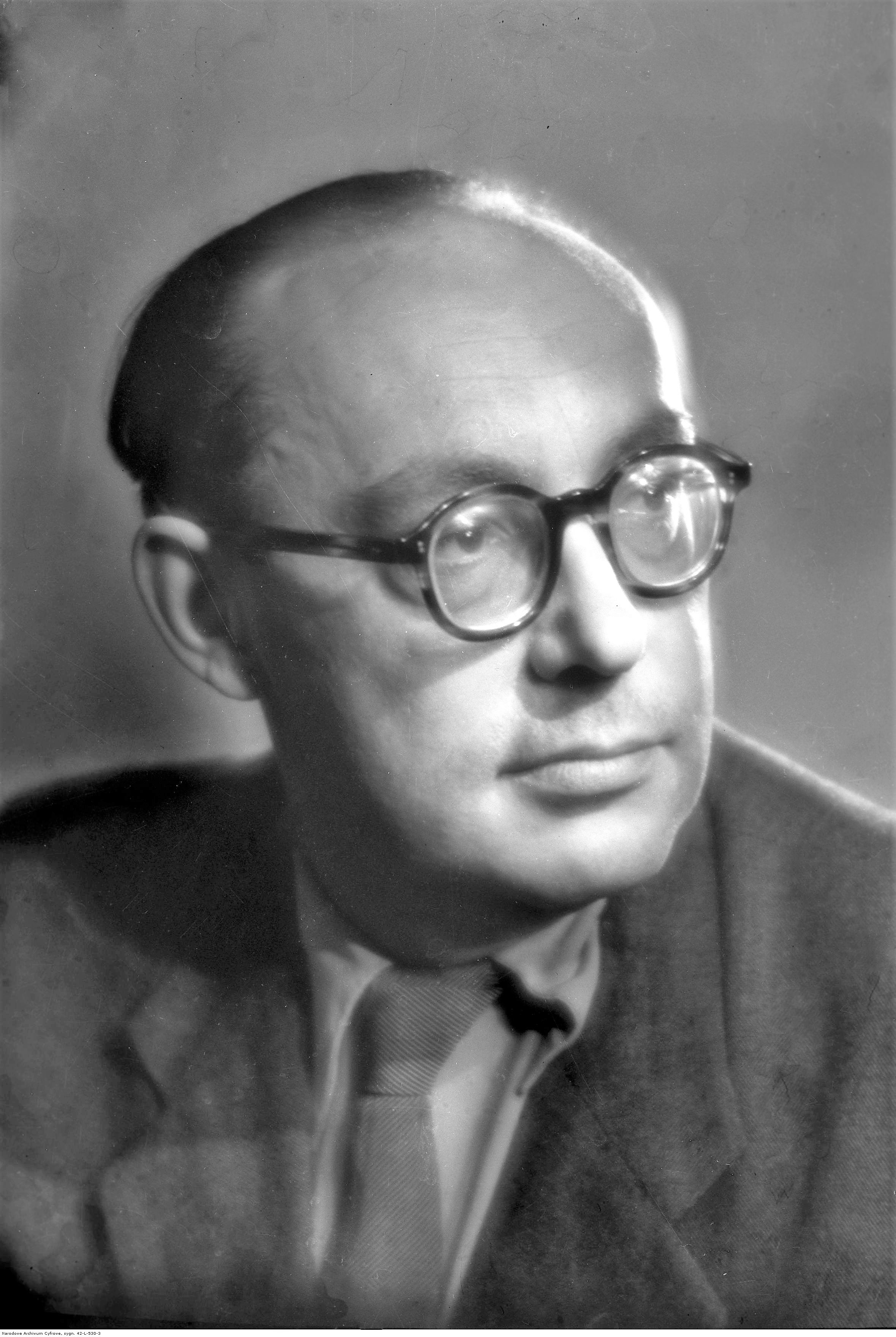
- Stanisław Wohl
- Born: 24 July 1912; Warszawa
- Died: 21 May 1985 (aged 72); Warszawa
- Occupations: Film director, screenwriter, cinematographer

Stanisław Wohl (24 July 1912 – 21 May 1985) was a film director, screenwriter and cinematographer.

== Biography ==
In 1932 he graduated from the Ecole Technique de Photographie et de Cinematographie in Paris. During World War II, he worked as a cinematographer with the Soviet film industry. From 1943, he served as deputy commander (with the rank of lieutenant colonel) of the 1st Polish Army Division’s Film Unit. He was co-founder of Łódź Film School; he taught there from 1948 to 1981. In 1948 he joined Polish United Workers' Party. His son was Andrzej Wohl.

== Filmography ==
As cinematographer

- Przebudzenie (1934)
- Strachy (1938)
- Opowieść atlantycka (1954)
- Autobus odjeżdża 6.20 (1954)
- Zemsta (1956)
- Król Maciuś I (1957)

As director

- Morze (1933)
- Dwie godziny (1946)
- Tysiąc talarów (1959)
- Przygoda noworoczna (1963)
- Złote koło (1971)
- Hania (1984)

As screenwriter

- Four Tank-Men and a Dog (1966–1970), TV series
- Tysiąc talarów (1959)

Source.

== Awards ==
- Silver Cross of Merit (1945)
- Knight's Cross of the Order of Polonia Restituta (1946)
- Gold Cross of Merit (22 January 1946)
- Medal of the 10th Anniversary of People's Poland (1954)
- Officer's Cross of the Order of Polonia Restituta (1955)
- Commander's Cross of the Order of the Polonia Restituta (1975)
