= Al mahattah =

Al mahattah may refer to:

- Al mahattah, Saudi Arabia
- al-Mahattah, Yemen
- Al Mahatta fort, UAE
