= 5th British Academy Film Awards =

1952 film awards ceremony

- Date: 8 May 1952
- Site: Odeon Theatre, Marble Arch, London

Highlights
- Best Film: La Ronde
- Best British Film: The Lavender Hill Mob

The 5th British Academy Film Awards, retroactively known as the British Academy Film Awards, given by the British Academy of Film and Television Arts (BAFTA) (previously the British Film Academy) in 1952, honoured the best films of 1951. La Ronde won the award for Best Film.

== Winners and nominees ==
Winners are listed first and highlighted in boldface; the nominees are listed below alphabetically and not in boldface.

Best British Film	Best Film from any Source
**The Lavender Hill Mob**; The Magic Box; The Browning Version; The Magic Garden; The Man in the White Suit; No Resting Place; The Small Miracle; White Corridors	**La Ronde**; An American In Paris; The Browning Version; Detective Story; Fourteen Hours; Domenica d'agosto; Froken Julie; The Lavender Hill Mob; The Magic Box; The Magic Garden; The Man in the White Suit; No Resting Place; The Red Badge of Courage; The Small Miracle; The Sound of Fury; A Walk in the Sun; White Corridors; Édouard et Caroline
Best Documentary	Special Award
**In Beaver Valley**; A Family Affair; Family Portrait; Oil for the Twentieth Century; Out of True; Visit to Picasso	**Gerald McBoing-Boing**; The Diesel Story; Enterprise; Henry Moore; The Isle Of Man TT 1950; Mother's Day; We've Come a Long Way
United Nations Award
**Four in a Jeep**; A Family Affair; The Good Life; Power for All; The Sound of Fury
