= Film award =

Recognition for cinematic achievements

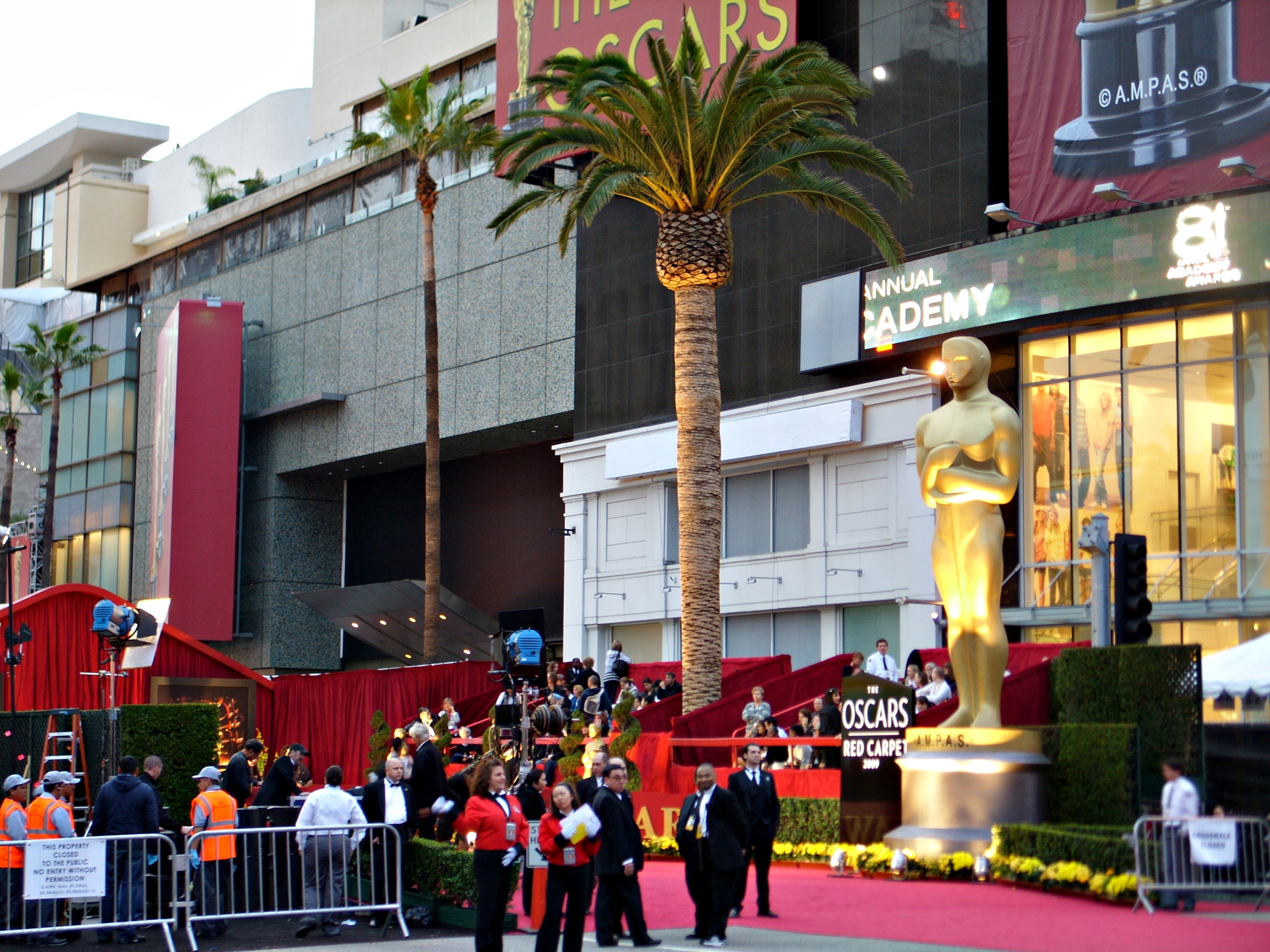
81st Academy Awards Ceremony

Film award is a cinematic award which can be awarded in several categories. Unlike the film festival, the film award is not accompanied by a public screening of competitive films. Film awards are usually awarded based on the results of secret voting by experts and less often on the results of the jury discussion.

== Three most prestigious film awards ==
=== Academy Awards ===
Academy Awards, popularly known as "Oscar" — the award of the American Academy of cinema — is the most famous and prestigious award in film making industry, both domestic and international. The first award ceremony "Oscar" was held in 1929. Now the Oscars ceremony is broadcast live in dozens of countries around the world. Unlike most film festivals, "Oscars" are awarded by the results of a General vote of the Academy members, and not by the choice of a jury.

=== Golden Globe Awards ===
Golden Globe Awards is one of the most prestigious awards in both filmmaking and television industry, seeks to offer an independent view of Hollywood cinema. The award ceremony takes place in Los Angeles (US).

=== BAFTA Film Awards ===
British Academy Film Awards are held in London annually in mid-February. The first time the awarding of the best British filmmakers of this prize was held in 1949. And if then there were only three nominations, now there are nineteen, and four special nominal awards are awarded. The BAFTA award, which has become international, and the Golden globe award, the winners of which are chosen by members of the Hollywood foreign press Association, are a kind of dress rehearsal for Oscar, because in most cases they anticipate the voting results of members of the American Academy of cinema. Previously BAFTA held a separate awards ceremony for children's film and television, however as of 2024 there is a Children's Film category at the awards.

== The Big Four Critics' Awards ==
These are the four most prestigious film critics awards known as "The Big Four", for those including;

=== Los Angeles Film Critics' Association ===
The Los Angeles Film Critics Association (LAFCA) is an American film critic organization founded in 1975, honoring members of the film industry who have excelled in their fields over the calendar year.

=== National Board of Review ===
The National Board of Review of Motion Pictures, known as National Board of Review (NBR) is a non-profit organization of New York City area film enthusiasts. Its awards, which are announced in early December, are considered an early harbinger of the film awards season that culminates in the Academy Awards.

=== National Society of Film Critics ===
The National Society of Film Critics (NSFC) is an American film critic organization founded in 1966 in the New York City apartment of the Saturday Review critic Hollis Alpert, one of several co-founding film critics who was refused membership to the New York Film Critics Circle due to it preferred critics who worked for mainstream newspapers. The organization is known for its highbrow tastes.

=== New York Film Critics' Circle ===
The New York Film Critics Circle (NYFCC) is an American film critic organization founded in 1935 by Wanda Hale from the New York Daily News. Its membership includes over 30 film critics from New York-based daily and weekly newspapers, magazines, online publications.

== Other awards ==
=== Annie Awards ===
The Annie Awards, known as "Annie", is an annual award ceremony in the field of animation, which the Los Angeles branch of the International Animated Film Association, ASIFA-Hollywood, has presented each year since 1972 to recognize excellence in animation shown in cinema and television. Originally designed to celebrate lifetime or career contributions to animation, the award has been given to individual works since 1992.

=== Golden Raspberry Awards ===
The Golden Raspberry Awards, known as the Razzies and Razzie Awards, is a parody award ceremony honoring the worst of cinematic under-achievements (with the exception of the Razzie Redeemer Award). It is an opposite ceremony of the Academy Awards.

== See also ==
- Film festival
- List of film awards
