= Cat & Mouse (1958 film) =

British crime drama by Paul Rotha

- DVD cover
- Directed by: Paul Rotha
- Screenplay by: Paul Rotha
- Based on: Novel by John Creasey
- Produced by: Paul Rotha
- Starring: Lee Patterson; Ann Sears; Victor Maddern
- Cinematography: Wolfgang Suschitzky
- Production company: Anvil Films
- Distributed by: Eros Films (UK)
- Release date: August 1958 (UK)
- Running time: 79 min
- Country: United Kingdom
- Language: English

Cat & Mouse (also known as Cat and Mouse; U.S. title: The Desperate Men) is a 1958 British second feature ('B') crime drama film directed by Paul Rotha, starring Lee Patterson, Ann Sears and Victor Maddern. The screenplay was by Rotha, based on the 1955 novel Cat and Mouse by John Creasey, writing as Michael Halliday.

== Plot ==
A deserter from the American army holds a young British woman hostage, believing she knows the location of a fortune in diamonds.

== Cast ==
- Lee Patterson as Rod Fenner
- Ann Sears as Ann Coltby
- Victor Maddern as Superintendent Harding
- Hilton Edwards as Mr. Scruby
- Diana Fawcett as Mrs. Pomeroy
- Roddy McMillan as Mr. Pomeroy
- Stuart Saunders as plainclothes Sergeant
- George Rose as second-hand clothes dealer
- Llewellyn Rees as bank manager
- Robert Mackenzie as American army officer

== Critical reception ==
The Monthly Film Bulletin wrote: "An interesting experiment in low-budget feature production by a distinguished documentary director, this film has a strong sense of place and period. The genteel decaying London streets, the cold suburbs, the mood of bitterness and resentment expressed by the fugitive American are all very much of our time, and are presented with vigour and feeling. ... One of the great virtues of this film is that it achieves excitement and tension without exploiting violence."

The Radio Times Guide to Films gave the film 3/5 stars, writing: "This claustrophobic thriller denies documentary director Paul Rotha the chance to demonstrate his facility with realism. Yet he still generates a fair amount of suspense ... This is superior to the majority of British B-movies made at the time "

In British Sound Films: The Studio Years 1928–1959 David Quinlan rated the film as "good", writing: "Offbeat thriller with good atmosphere and performances."
