= The World Is Rich =

1947 film

- Directed by: Paul Rotha
- Written by: Arthur Calder-Marshall
- Produced by: Paul Rotha
- Cinematography: Wolfgang Suschitzky
- Music by: Clifton Parker
- Production company: Films Of Fact
- Distributed by: Central Office of Information; Ministry of Food
- Release date: 1947
- Running time: 46 minutes
- Country: United Kingdom
- Language: English

The World Is Rich is a 1947 British documentary film directed by Paul Rotha about food shortages after World War II. It was written by Arthur Calder-Marshall and produced by Films of Fact for the Central Office of Information and the Ministry of Food.

== Cast ==
- James McKechnie as narrator
- Sir John Boyd Orr as himself
- Valentine Dyall as narrator
- Allan Michie as narrator
- Elizabeth Cowell as narrator
- Robert Adams as narrator
- Roy Plomley as narrator
- Leonard Sachs as narrator

== Reception ==
Kine Weekly wrote: "Somewhat violent in its propaganda, it could have been equally effective without overloading its argument with painful shots of men, women, children and cattle dead and dying of drought and starvation. Sensible filmgoers fully realise the urgency of the problem and do not need to be shocked or shamed into sympathy and action. ... To spring the picture, however worthy its aim, on an ordinary audience, bent upon entertainment, is, to our minds, something of an imposition. The freer the screen is kep of propaganda the better."

The Daily Film Renter wrote: "This provocative C.O.I. documentary covers an enormous range in an effort to show how the present world food situation arose in which the few live luxuriously while thousands starve to death. But it is diverse and emotional and does not seem to get anywhere in particular. There can be no gainsaying the poignancy of its grim famine scenes, but scant consolation is offered apart from a few platitudes. Instructional, interesting and arresting – but hardly entertaining from the viewpoint of the general audience."

In Tribune, X wrote: "Mr Rotha is mellowing. His new fiim, a post-war sequel to World of Plenty, is less aggressive, relying more on persuasion and less on direct exhortation than most of his earlier work. ... He seems no longer to feel that he is preaching to a resisting audience. His purpose is now more to open the eyes of an audience, one hopes a majority audience, that wants to face facts and is more easily convinced that they are facts. The result is that The World is Rich can afford to be dialectic as well as didactic, and its cause is served all the better for that. It can also afford to be horrible. Its shots of those dying and dead of starvation will horrify people, as they should, the more so as the argument they illustrate does not need to be treated as controversial. ... Furthermore, it goes far to solving that bugbear problem of all documentary directors – how to maintain a balance between the visual and the aural without overdoing the counterpoint (which is apparently inevitable but which can be the ruination of documentary unless it is kept within bounds). If The World is Rich gets the wide booking it deserves, it will do invaluable work."

== Accolades ==
It was nominated for an Academy Award for Best Documentary Feature.
