= Air Outpost =

1937 film by Paul Rotha

Air Outpost is a 1937 film produced by documentary maker Paul Rotha focusing on the Imperial Airways 'Empire Route' and highlighting a day at the aerodrome at Sharjah, then one of the Trucial States and now one of the United Arab Emirates. The film was made by Rotha for Strand Films and was one of three commissioned by Imperial Airways to showcase the Empire Route and highlight its efficiency and safety for passengers.

The film was to be used as an important source of information in the reconstruction of the demolished Sharjah Fort in 1997.

Title screen of Strand Films' 1937 documentary film, Air Outpost.

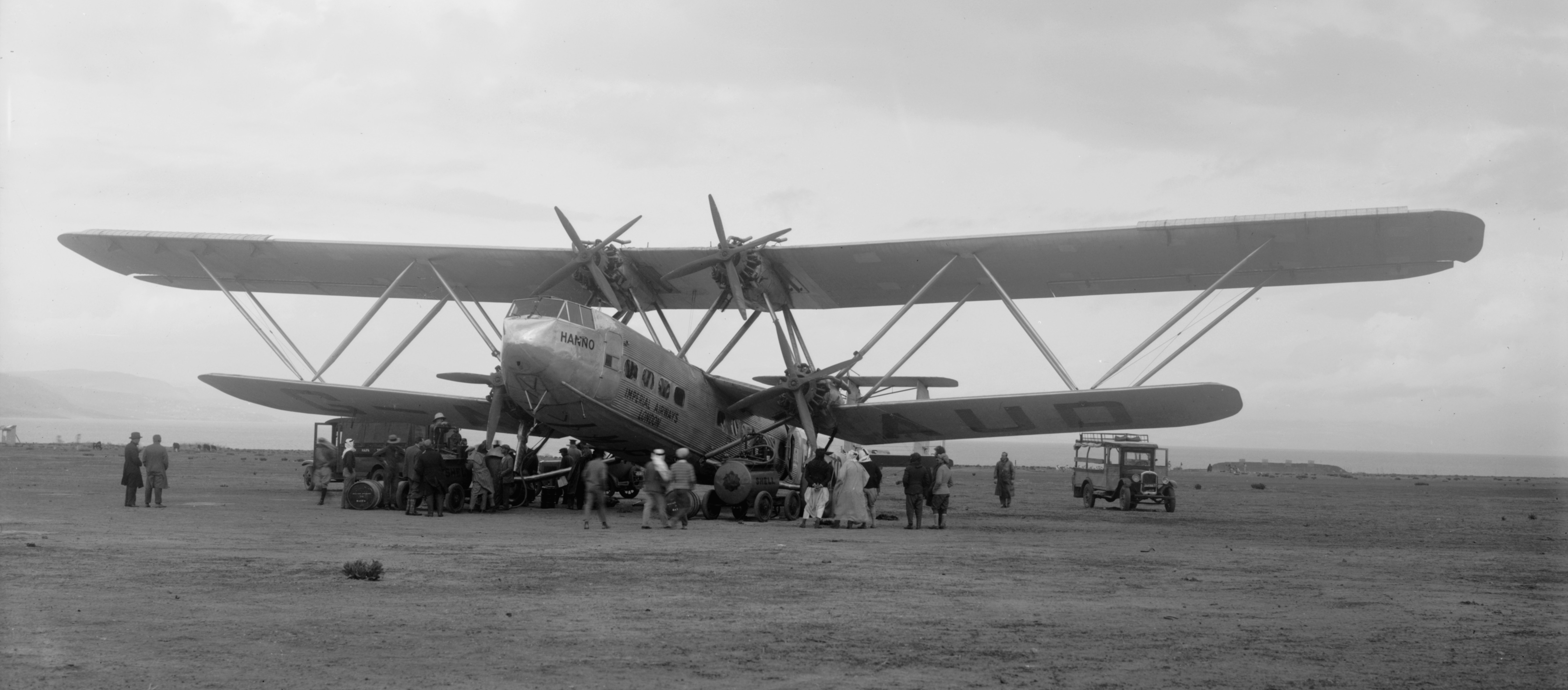
The Handley Page HP 42 airplane Hanno was featured in Air Outpost.

== Background ==
Subtitled '24 Hours at the City and Airport of Sharjah', Air Outpost showcases the operation of Sharjah Airport and the Mahatta Fort, which formed the main building of the airport and provided accommodation both for overnighting passengers and Imperial Airways' permanent staff of three British expatriates. Mahatta, according to the film, was "built in the shape of a square fort as a precaution against possible but improbable raids by wandering tribes of Bedouin" As it accommodated guests, the fort has been dubbed 'the first ever hotel in the UAE'.

Sharjah was an overnight stop between Baghdad and Jodphur on the Imperial Airways Eastern Route from Croydon Airport, Croydon, United Kingdom to Eagle Farm Airport, Brisbane, Australia. It was the first British establishment on the Trucial Coast. The route was originally flown by Handley Page HP42s, with two weekly flights landing in Sharjah on Sunday and Wednesday evenings on the outbound flight and Wednesday and Saturday evenings on the return flight. The airport itself was, according to the film, "A mile away from the Arab city of Sharjah" although it is now a museum in the heart of the city.

== Documentary ==
Rotha visited Sharjah in 1932 while he was making another film for Imperial Airways, Contact. Impressed by the location, he decided to film Sharjah to make Air Outpost. Rotha's initial 1932 visit was one month after the airway's inauguration and prior to the completion of construction on the Mahatta Fort, forcing him to spend the overnight stop in a tent.

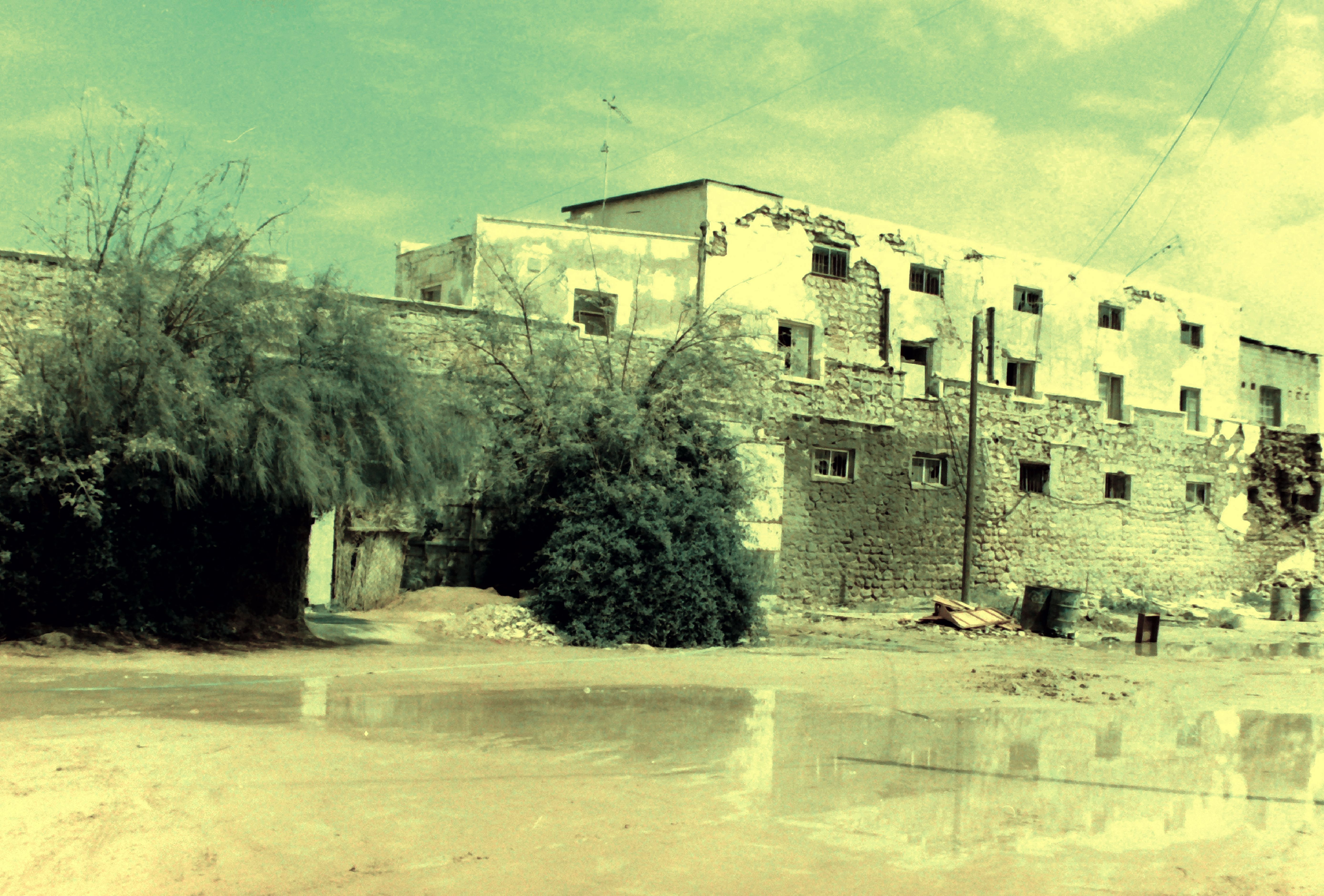
Mahatta Fort in the early 1990s, prior to restoration.

Air Outpost was intended to present a "dramatic but easily understandable microcosm of civil aviation's development". Other films in the high-profile series commissioned by Imperial Airways included The Future's in the Air and African Skyways. All three films had their premiere together at the Piccadilly Theatre in London on 12 November 1937 in front of an audience of 1,000 guests. Air Outpost was unusual for Imperial Airways’ documentaries in that it is entirely devoted to a single airfield, and that a remote stop on the London to India route. It was also unusual in that it provides unique footage of Sheikh Sultan II bin Saqr Al Qasimi, the Ruler of Sharjah in 1936, and of Sharjah Fort at the time. The fort itself was subsequently demolished and the footage taken for Air Outpost was used, together with other historical records and documents, in the 1997 reconstruction of the fort.

Imperial Airways was not only an important sponsor of documentary film making in the 1930s, but also presented an important revenue stream for Strand and other British film makers, to the point where it was considered a descendant of the Empire Marketing Board, and the leading commissioner of documentary films in Britain.

=== Production and direction ===
Air Outpost is credited to Paul Rotha for production, John Taylor for direction and photography and Ralph Keene for direction and editing. The film's score was composed by distinguished British composer William Alwyn. Alwyn's orientalist music for Air Outpost has been compared to Rimsky-Korsakov's Scheherazade.

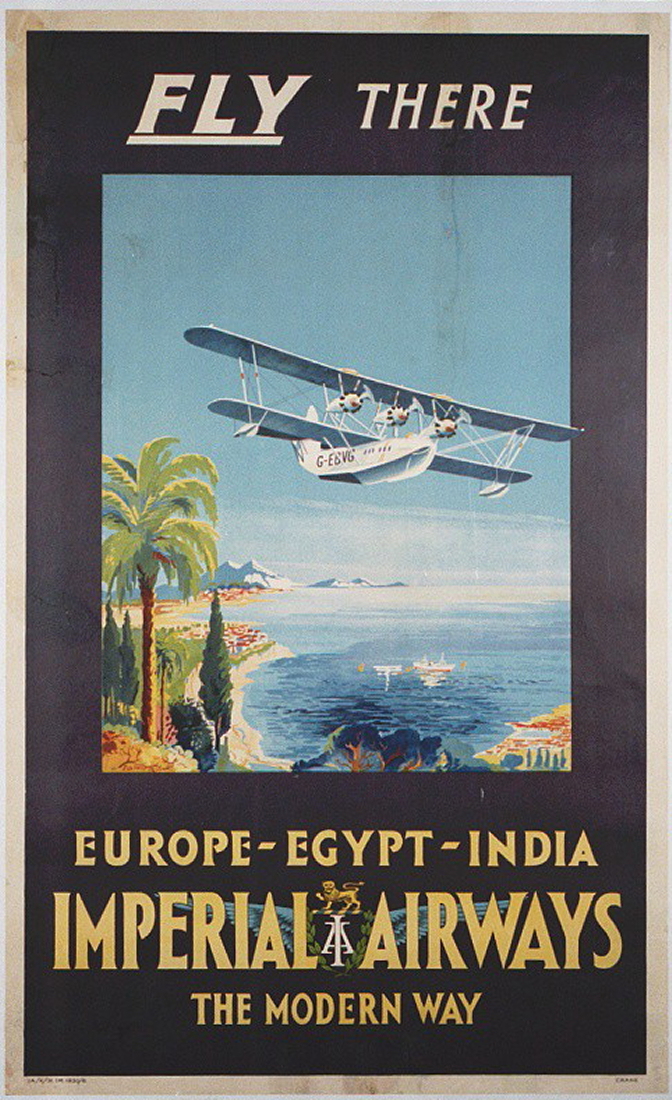
Imperial Airways advertisement featuring the Short S.8 Calcutta seaplane City of Alexandria.

The film tells the story of Sharjah Airport, showing preparations for the landing of the Handley Page HP 42 aircraft 'Hanno'. The station manager, a Scot by the name of Alistair Thomson, inspects the rooms together with his Indian major domo Abbas Khan, ensuring food and supplies of fresh water are available for guests. The 'Persian petrol boys' play cards waiting for the aircraft to arrive while the guards provided by the Ruler of Sharjah turn out to greet the incoming aircraft. With the guests enjoying their overnight stay, engineers work on the aeroplane's engines and staff take atmospheric measurements in order to calculate the wind for the following day's flight. The aircraft takes off on its onward journey, flying high above the airport and desert, watched by wondering Bedouin on horseback with falcons on their arms.

Although there is no confirmation that the script for Air Outpost was written by British novelist Graham Greene (Greene worked on The Future's in the Air), parallels have been drawn between the style of Greene's work on the sister film and the 'clipped prose' in the script of Air Outpost itself.

Copies of Air Outpost were among a collection of 13 British documentary films acquired by the film library of New Yorks' MOMA, the Museum of Modern Art, in 1939.

=== Filming ===
The actual footage for Air Outpost was shot by Taylor and Keene working based at Mahatta (at the time, as Air Outpost's narrator points out, "one mile from the Arab town of Sharjah") for six days. During this time they secured the Ruler's permission to film in the town (Rotha had previously secured this permission in 1932 but had not used the opportunity) and also filmed not only Hanno but its sister aircraft Horsa – at one stage scheduling led to both aircraft being on the ground at Sharjah at once, leading to additional filming opportunities for the crew but also to continuity errors in the final film – including the orientation of the departing airliner leading to the film having to be reversed in order to show it flying East to India. This led to the final film showing Sharjah Airport and Mahatta Fort back to front. Using a 35-millimetre Bell & Howell Eyemo and a British-made Newman Sinclair 35-mm cine camera, Taylor and Keene shot some 3,700 feet of film in all during their time in Sharjah.

=== Coronation ===
In one scene in Air Outpost, in which the inbound passengers disembark from Hanno after its late afternoon landing, one passenger is heard to exclaim, "the Coronation was marvellous", an unusual feat for a person filmed in 1936, as the Coronation of George VI did not take place until 12 May 1937, six months after filming had finished in Sharjah. This is taken by academics as confirmation the script itself was not finalised until long after shooting had taken place.
