= 1st British Academy Film Awards =

1949 ceremony for 1947 and 1948 films

- Date: 29 May 1949
- Site: Odeon Luxe Leicester Square, London

Highlights
- Best Film: The Best Years of Our Lives
- Best British Film: Odd Man Out
- Most awards: The Best Years of Our Lives, Odd Man Out (1)

The 1st British Film Academy Awards (retroactively known as the British Academy Film Awards), were handed out on 29 May 1949 at the Odeon Luxe Leicester Square, in London, for films shown in the United Kingdom in 1947 and 1948. They were presented by the British Film Academy (currently, British Academy of Film and Television Arts (BAFTA)), an organisation established in 1947 by filmmakers from Great Britain, for the "advancement of the art and technique of the film". The Academy bestowed accolades in three categories: Best British Film, Best Picture from any source – British or Foreign and a Special Award. British film producer Michael Balcon chaired the ceremony.

Odd Man Out won Best British Film. Best Film from any source – British or Foreign was awarded to American film The Best Years of Our Lives. Documentary, The World Is Rich received the Special Award. Bronze trophies, designed by Henry Moore were given to the director of the films, on behalf of the motion pictures' production units.

== Winners ==
Winners highlighted in boldface. All sources used in this article make no mention of nominees in any of the categories.

Best British Picture	Best Picture from any source – British or Foreign
**Odd Man Out**	**The Best Years of Our Lives (United States)**

=== Special Award ===
- The World Is Rich (Documentary)

== See also ==
- 5th Golden Globe Awards
- 20th Academy Awards
