= World of Plenty =

- Directed by: Paul Rotha
- Written by: Eric Knight; Paul Rotha; John Boyd Orr
- Produced by: Yvonne Fletcher
- Cinematography: Wolfgang Suschitzky
- Music by: William Alwyn
- Production company: Paul Rotha Productions
- Release date: 1943
- Running time: 43 mins
- Country: United Kingdom
- Language: English

World of Plenty is a 1943 British documentary film directed by Paul Rotha for the Ministry of Agriculture and Fisheries. It was written by Eric Knight, Rotha and John Boyd Orr and discusses problems with, and possible improvements to, global food distribution.

== Synopsis ==
An opening narration explains that the film's purpose is to examine the "world strategy of food", in terms of its production, distribution and consumption. Following the principles of dialectical montage at both the level of detail and of overall structure, the film is divided into three major parts: "Food – As It Was" (prewar), "Food – As It Is" (during the war) and "Food – As It Might Be" (looking forward to the postwar era).

== Cast ==
- Eric Knight as man in the street commentator
- Marjorie Rhodes as housewife
- E.V.H. Emmett as newsreel commentator
- John Boyd Orr
- Otto Neurath as themes/Isotype designs commentator
- Lord Horder
- Henry Hallatt as commentator
- L.V. Easterbrook
- Robert St. John as commentator

== Reception ==
The Monthly Film Bulletin wrote: "Rotha has developed a new interesting discussion technique of presentation of a subject such as this, and the intellectual interest never flags. Facts and views have been assembled from many sources, and the whole compounded into an outstanding example of statement by film showing the arguments for adopting a certain line of government policy and making its accomplishment seem perhaps too easy a matter."

Kine Weekly wrote: "Highly interesting documentary dealing af with food problems before, during and after the war. It is presented in a very ingenious manner from the script by Paul Rotha and the late Eric Knight. ... Excellently planned diagrams give concise explanation of various points. Altogether a notable documentary."
