= Wolfgang Suschitzky =

Austrian cinematographer (1912–2016)

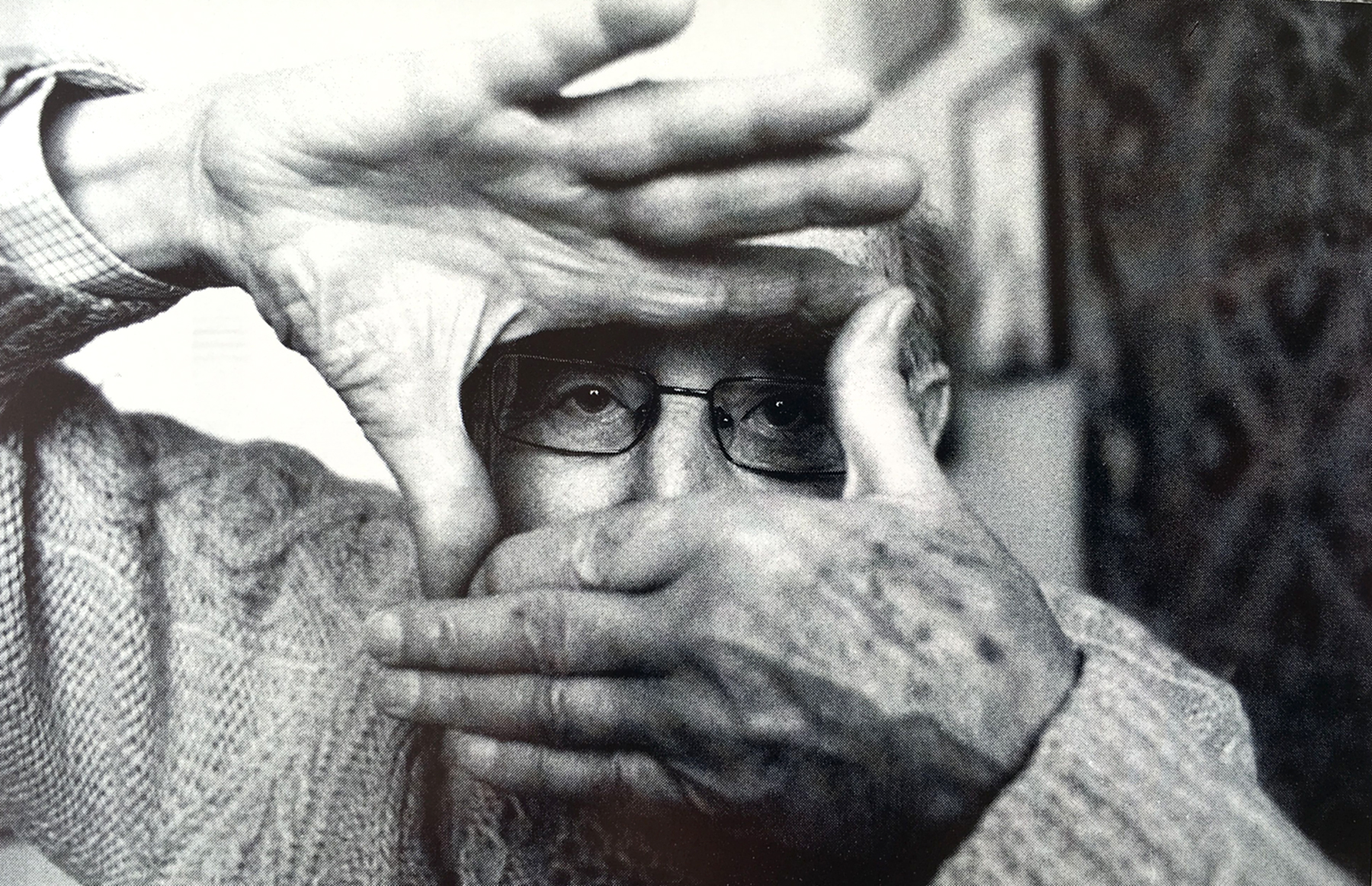
- Born: 29 August 1912; Vienna, Austria-Hungary
- Died: 7 October 2016 (aged 104); London, England, UK
- Occupations: Cinematographer, Photographer
- Years active: 1934–1984
- Spouse: Ilona Donath Suschitzky
- Children: 3, including Peter

Wolfgang Suschitzky, BSC (29 August 1912 – 7 October 2016), was an Austrian-born British documentary photographer, as well as a cinematographer perhaps best known for his collaboration with Paul Rotha in the 1940s and his work on Mike Hodges' 1971 film Get Carter.

Andrew Pulver described Suschitzky in 2007 as "a living link to the prewar glory days of the British documentary movement." Steve Chibnall writes that Suschitzky "[developed] a reputation as an expert location photographer with a documentarist's ability to extract atmosphere from naturalistic settings." His photographs have been exhibited at the National Gallery, the Austrian Cultural Forum in London and the Photographers' Gallery, and appear in many international photography collections. He was the father of cinematographer Peter Suschitzky (born 1941), classical musician and writer Misha Donat, and Julia Donat.

== Early life ==
Suschitzky was born in Vienna, Austria-Hungary. His father was a Viennese social democrat of Jewish origin, but had renounced his faith in 1908 and become an atheist, or "konfessionslos". He opened the first social democratic bookshop in Vienna (later to become a publisher), and Suschitzky was born in the apartment above the bookshop. His sister was photographer Edith Tudor-Hart (1908–1973). Suschitzky said of his father "he was a great man. I realised that later on in life, not so much when I saw him every day. But, I met interesting people, some of his authors who came and had lunch with us or met people who came to his shop." In an interview at the age of 95 in September 2007, Suschitzky recalled boyhood memories of the excitement that greeted the Russian Revolution in 1917. As he was brought up with no faith, he remembered the envy of his friends that he was allowed to miss religious classes and sit outside reading a book and described himself as "a very naughty boy. We played all sorts of tricks with… my chums in the park, every afternoon." He was often in trouble at home and at school. On the advice of the counsellor for education of Vienna, his father sent him to a day boarding school to learn some discipline. However he continued to be mischievous and was often detained at school.

Suschitzky's first love was zoology, but he realised he could not make a living in Austria in this discipline, so instead, influenced by his sister, he studied photography at the Höhere Graphische Bundes-Lehr- und Versuchsanstalt. At this time, the political climate in Austria was changing from a Socialist Democracy to Austrofascism. Being a Socialist and of Jewish origin, Suschitzky decided there was no future for him in Austria and in 1934 left for London where his sister lived; while he was in London his father committed suicide. Suschitzky married a Dutch woman, Helena Wilhelmina Maria Elisabeth (Puck) Voûte in Hampstead and they moved to the Netherlands. His wife left him after a year, which he said "was great luck because had I stayed there, I wouldn’t be alive anymore, I'm sure." He returned to England in 1935, and in 1939 married Ilona Donath, with whom he had three children.

== Career ==
Suschitzky's first job was in the Netherlands photographing postcards for newsagents. This job lasted only a few months. He travelled to England in 1935 and became a film cameraman for Paul Rotha, with whom he had a long working relationship. Their work during the war included World of Plenty (1943) and government-sponsored information shorts and magazine programmes. With Rotha he graduated to feature films, working on No Resting Place (1951), which was one of the first British feature films shot entirely on location. The film was nominated for a BAFTA Award for Best Film in 1952. He then photographed Colin Lesslie's production, the comedy The Oracle (1953), followed by another Rotha film, Cat & Mouse (1958). He also worked on Jack Clayton's short film The Bespoke Overcoat which won an Oscar for "Best Short Subject, Two-reel" at the 1956 Oscars. He also took a photograph of the writer C. S. Lewis in approximately 1959.

In the 1960s, Suschitzky work included Joseph Strick's adaptation of James Joyce's Ulysses (1967) and Hammer Film Productions' Vengeance of She (Cliff Owen, 1968). He also photographed the British crime film The Small World of Sammy Lee (1963), directed by Ken Hughes. This film proved influential to screenwriter Mike Hodges, with whom Suschitzky worked on Get Carter (1971). His last film before photographing Get Carter was the adaptation of Joe Orton's Entertaining Mr. Sloane (1970) directed by Douglas Hickox.

His other credits include two films directed by Jack Couffer, Ring of Bright Water (1969) and Living Free (1972), which was the sequel to Born Free. Issue 12 of Lid magazine featured a twenty-eight-page portfolio of Suschitzky's photographs with a portrait and essay by Gerard Malanga. His son Peter Suschitzky ASC/BSC is also a cinematographer. Wolf (or Su, as he is also known) is featured in the book Conversations with Cinematographers by David A Ellis (Scarecrow Press).

== Photography ==
For Suschitzky, who was described as having "social conscience of a documentarian and the eye of a german expressionist", the depiction of work and working people occupies a central place in his photographic oeuvre., documentary photography consisted in the sympathetic-commentary depiction of social conditions: "The photo document is the reflection of the contemporary scene and represents in its best form subtle photographic comment on social conditions, rather than direct social propaganda", Suschitzky said. At the beginning of his career, he photographed classic commissioned works for magazines such as Picture Post, Illustrated, Animal and Zoo or Geographic Magazine; later, his photographs were largely taken alongside his work as a cameraman. Characteristic of his photographic work is that it is often not possible to clearly distinguish between his fields of activity, that he often used film and photo camera almost simultaneously, which can lead to special aesthetic effects, such as motifs existing several times in different contexts or documentary photography being created on the fringes of cinematic productions, as Peter Schreiner puts it:

"Suschitzky's Photographs "are difficult to ascribe to a particular photographic genre. On the one hand, they represent vivid records that provide an account of what are now historical contexts, of traditional craft and of heavy industrial production, but above all of social relationships within a restless world. On the other, they themselves are the products of a particular context of production. The fact that they were taken either on the periphery or at the very heart of (documentary) film sets [...] is also an essential characteristic that contributes to Wolf Suschitzky's distinctive blend of naturalistic and staged moments."

His photographic estate is largely housed in the FOTOHOF archiv.

== Death ==
Suschitzky died on 7 October 2016 at the age of 104 in London.

== Wolf Suschitzky Photography Prize ==
The Wolf Suschitzky Photography Prize has been awarded every two years since 2018 by the Austrian Cultural Forum London: to reflect Suschitzky's connection to his homeland as well as his adopted country, the prize is awarded simultaneously to one Austrian and one British photographer. A jury will select one winner from each country, who will receive prize money, exhibition opportunities and a residency in the other country.

== Filmography ==
- World of Plenty (Paul Rotha, 1943)
- Triumph Over Deafness / Education of the Deaf (Cinematographer) (Jack Ellitt, for D.A.T.A. Films & the British Council, 1946)
- The World Is Rich (1947)
- No Resting Place (Paul Rotha, 1951)
- The Oracle (C.M. Pennington-Richards, 1953)
- Cat & Mouse (Paul Rotha, 1958)
- The Bespoke Overcoat (1956)
- Snow (Geoffrey Jones, 1963)
- Sands of Beersheba (1966)
- Ulysses (Joseph Strick, 1967)
- Vengeance of She (Cliff Owen, 1968)
- Les Bicyclettes de Belsize (1968)
- The Small World of Sammy Lee (Ken Hughes 1963),
- Ring of Bright Water (Jack Couffer, 1969)
- Entertaining Mr. Sloane (Douglas Hickox, 1970)
- Get Carter (Mike Hodges, 1971)
- Living Free (Jack Couffer, 1972)
- Some Kind of Hero (1972)
- Theatre of Blood (1973)
- Moments (1974)
- Something to Hide (1976)
- Falling in Love Again (1980)
- Good and Bad at Games (TV series, 1983)
- The Young Visiters (1984)
- The Chain (Jack Gold, 1984)

== Publications ==
- 2020 Wolf Suschitzky. Work. Salzburg: FOTOHOF archiv. ISBN 978-3-903334-05-2
- 2025 Wolf Suschitzky. Exile and Journeys. Salzburg: FOTOHOF archiv. ISBN 978-3-903595-02-6
