= The Magic Garden (1951 film) =

1951 film by Donald Swanson

- Directed by: Donald Swanson
- Release date: January 1, 1951
- Running time: +63 minutes
- Country: South Africa

The Magic Garden, also known as The Pennywhistle Blues, is a 1951 feature film produced and directed by British filmmaker Donald Swanson in South Africa, made in and around Johannesburg with an amateur cast. It is historically important in South African cinema as the first film with an all-black cast to be shown in the white cinemas in racially-segregated Johannesburg. It was nominated for two British Academy Film Awards (BAFTAs), for Best Film from any Source and Best British Film. It stars Tommy Ramokgopa, who also wrote some of the film's music. Willard Cele contributes to the soundtrack by playing the "Pennywhistle Blues" on the pennywhistle.

== Plot ==
The film is a comical fable about an old man who gives his life savings to a priest, only for the money to be stolen by a thief (Ramokgopa), setting off a series of adventures. Eventually the thief is caught and the money returned, but before then the money is able to bring much good to several people whose hands it passes through.

== Critical reaction ==
On release it was highly praised by The New York Times, which noted its charm and vivacity and compared it to René Clair, particularly applauding Ramokgopa's performance. Jet found the film mediocre by western standards and technically crude, despite its historical importance.
