= 5th Golden Globe Awards =

Film award ceremony in 1948

- Date: March 10, 1948

Highlights
- Best Picture: Gentleman's Agreement
- Most awards: Gentleman's Agreement (4)

The 5th Golden Globe Awards, honoring the best achievements in 1947 filmmaking, were held on March 10, 1948 at the Hollywood Roosevelt Hotel in Los Angeles, California.

== Winners ==
=== Best Picture ===
- Gentleman's Agreement directed by Elia Kazan

=== Best Actor in a Leading Role ===
- Ronald Colman – A Double Life

=== Best Actress in a Leading Role ===
- Rosalind Russell – Mourning Becomes Electra

=== Best Performance by an Actor in a Supporting Role in a Motion Picture ===
- Edmund Gwenn – Miracle on 34th Street

=== Best Performance by an Actress in a Supporting Role in a Motion Picture ===
- Celeste Holm – Gentleman's Agreement

=== Best Director-Motion Picture ===
- Elia Kazan – Gentleman's Agreement

=== Best Screenplay ===
- Miracle on 34th Street written by George Seaton

=== Best Music, Original Score - Motion Picture ===
- Life with Father composed by Max Steiner

=== Cinematography ===
- Black Narcissus photographed by Jack Cardiff

=== Most Promising Newcomer – Male ===
- Richard Widmark in Kiss of Death

=== Most Promising Newcomer – Female ===
- Lois Maxwell in That Hagen Girl

=== Special Award – Best Juvenile Actor ===
- Dean Stockwell in Gentleman's Agreement

=== Special Achievement Award ===
- Walt Disney for Bambi Furthering The Influence Of The Screen

== See also ==
- Hollywood Foreign Press Association
- 1st British Academy Film Awards
- 2nd Cannes Film Festival
- 20th Academy Awards
- 1947 in film
