= Out of True (film) =

1951 British film

- Opening titles
- Directed by: Philip Leacock
- Written by: Montagu Slater
- Produced by: Frederick Wilson
- Starring: Jane Hylton; Muriel Pavlow
- Edited by: Terry Trench
- Music by: Elisabeth Lutyens
- Distributed by: Crown Film Unit
- Release date: 1951
- Running time: 40 minutes
- Country: United Kingdom
- Language: English

Out of True is a 1951 British second feature ('B') short drama-documentary film, directed by Philip Leacock and starring Jane Hylton and Muriel Pavlow. It was made by the Crown Film Unit with sponsorship from the Ministry of Health, and was promoted as a "fictional account of a nervous breakdown which conforms to the pattern of much of the mental illness occurring today". The film received a nomination in the category Best Documentary Film at the 1951 British Academy Film Awards. Its production was motivated, in part, by the U.S. film The Snake Pit, which some critics in the UK feared would cast all psychiatric hospitals in a negative light.

== Plot ==
Molly Slade wakes up feeling extremely depressed. She has run out of tea and goes to the local shop to buy some, but finds the shop still closed. Pushed over the edge by this seemingly trivial inconvenience, she ends up attempting suicide by jumping from a bridge into the river but is saved in time. Husband Arthur comes home from work to find that Molly has been committed to a psychiatric hospital. Molly's treatment involves medication and electroconvulsive therapy. While in hospital she befriends fellow patient Betty and together they are seen in exercise classes, playing table tennis and receiving occupational therapy. Molly leaves the hospital one night and goes home, but Arthur returns her to the hospital until she has completed her treatment and been officially released. Finally, with her treatment concluded and her mind back on an even keel, Molly is able to return to her family.

== Cast ==
- Jane Hylton as Molly Slade
- Muriel Pavlow as Betty
- David Evans as Arthur Slade
- Mary Merrall as Granny
- Beatrice Varley as Mrs. Green
- Robert Brown as Dr. Dale
- Jean Anderson as Dr. Bell

== Reception ==
The Monthly Film Bulletin wrote: "This 40-minute film is designed to tell a sober story about mental disturbance, and to show its treatment in decent, capable surroundings. Surprisingly, it begins with equivalent sensationalism – disordered mind is conveyed by vertiginous camera angles, objects going in and out of focus, crude musical noise and an echoing soundtrack; and the presentation of shock treatment, for instance, is equally dishonest – a quick, isolated sequence in itself, which shows us the gag fixed between the teeth, etc., but not the consequences of the treatment at all ... though its intentions arc genuine, and its application is conscientious, Out of True is hardly likely to break down popular prejudices any more than The Snake Pit did. The psychologist himself is true to screen cliché ... and the acting of the husband and mother-in-law is unsatisfactory. Out of True's best assets are the performances of Jane Hylton and Muriel Paviow, as Molly Slade and another inmate of the hospital."

Boxoffice wrote: "Very good. The case history of a mental patient is presented with candor and understanding. ... Thanks to a fine cast and expert technical supervision, this film sheds much light on a shadowy social problem and should elicit favorable audience reaction."
