= Mahatta Fort =

- Near Sharjah in Sharjah, United Arab Emirates
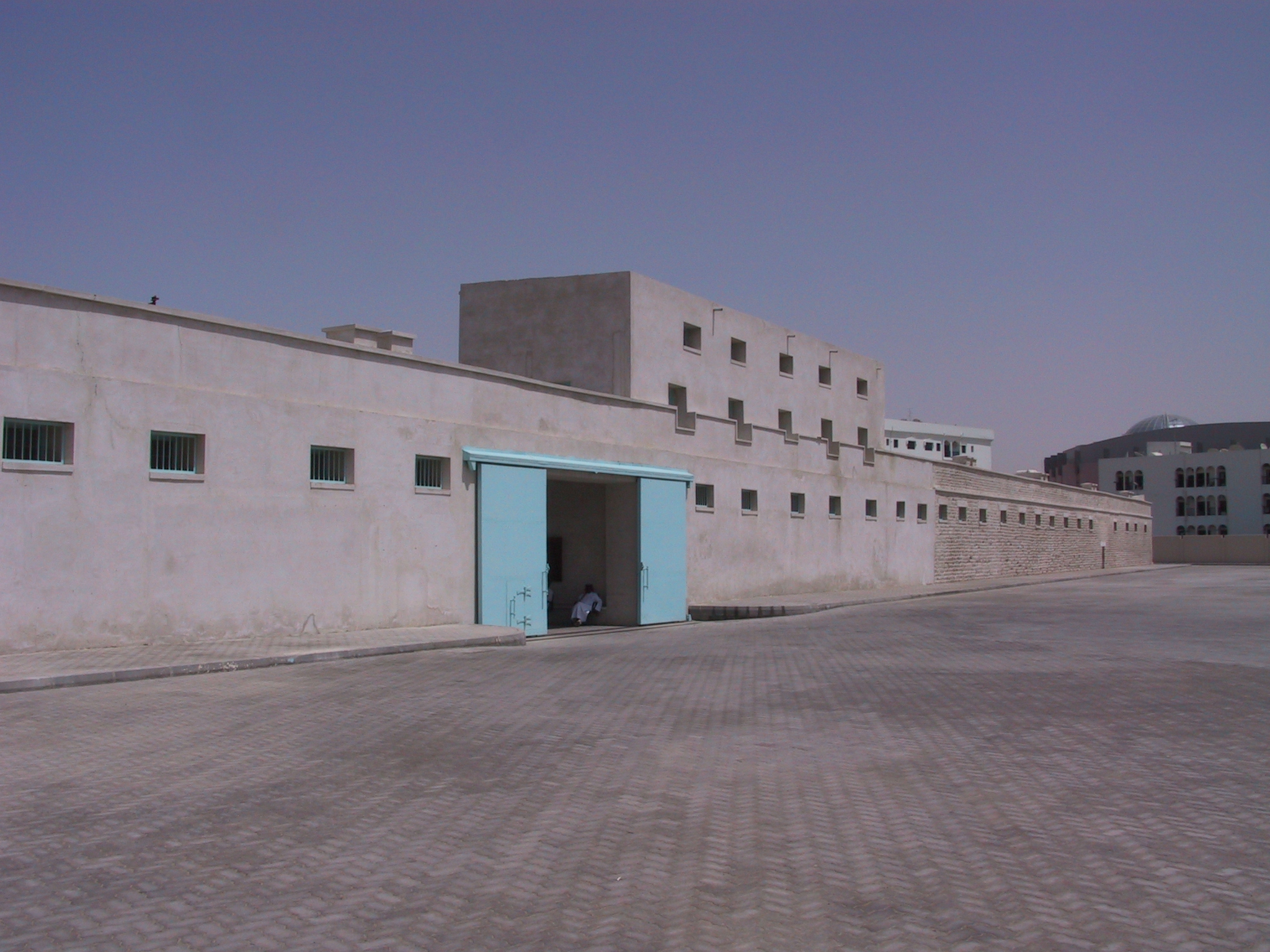

Site information
- Condition: Restored

Location
- Location within United Arab Emirates
- Coordinates: 25.346107°N 55.395265°E

Site history
- Built: 1932
- Materials: Stone, Coral, Gypsum

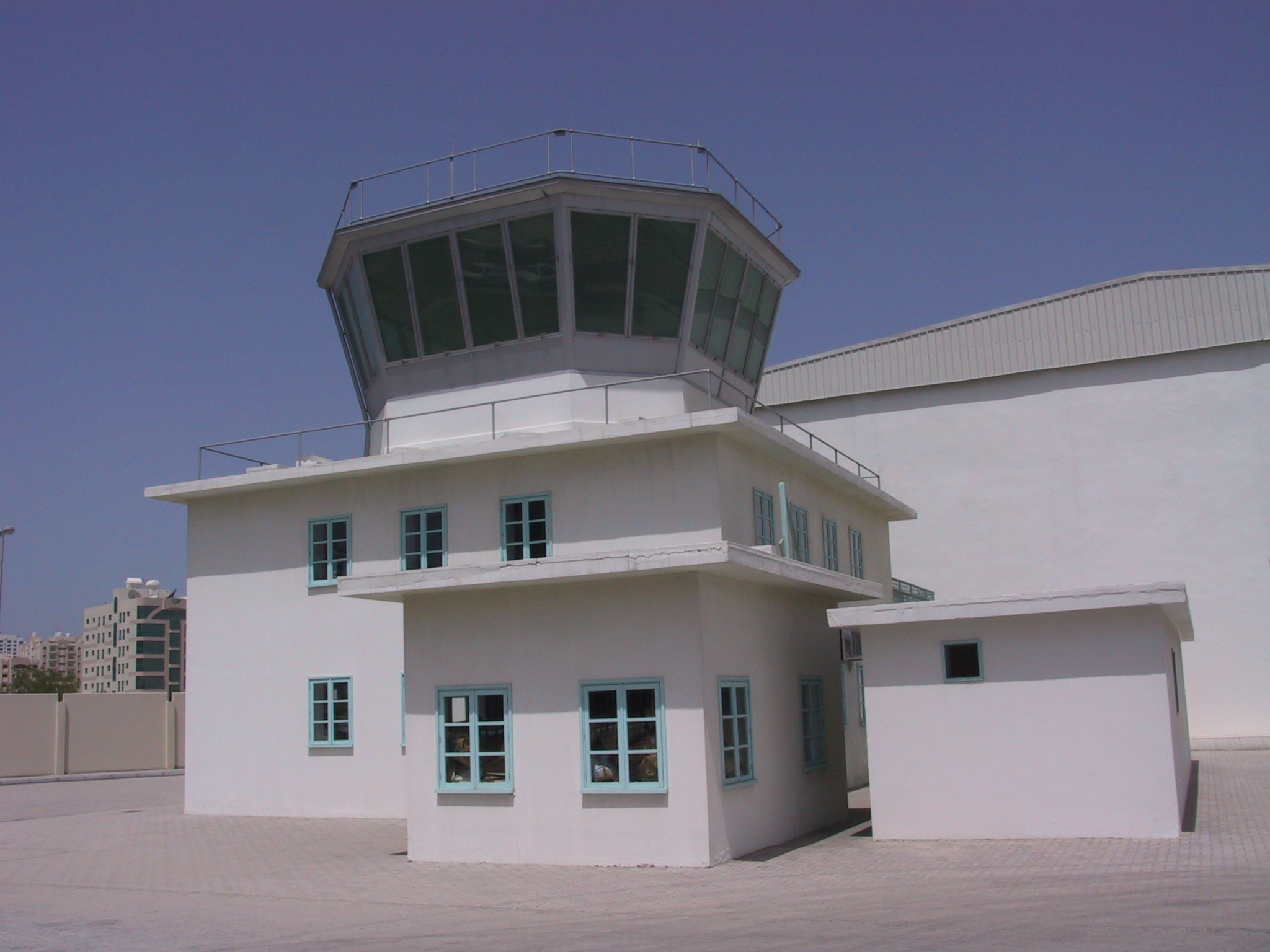
View of the Air Traffic Control Tower adjacent the fort. This was used by Sharjah International Airport until 1977 when a new inland airport was constructed.

Mahatta Fort ("the station" in Arabic) is located in central Sharjah in the United Arab Emirates. The fort was built by the Ruler of Sharjah in 1932 to afford protection for the passengers and staff of Imperial Airways. It was the first airport constructed on the Arabian Peninsula and the first British establishment on the Trucial Coast, after an agreement was struck between the British government (on behalf of Imperial Airways) and the ruler of Sharjah in June 1932. The Fort was used by the Royal Air Force in World War II and the Trucial Oman Scouts before briefly becoming a hotel, a police station and a school and is now an aviation museum, known as Al Mahatta Museum.

== History ==
The Imperial Airways Empire Route was originally established in 1927, linking Croydon in London to Cape Town in South Africa and Sydney in Australia. It originally traversed the Northern Shore of the Persian Gulf, with Imperial Airways seaplanes landing off Hengam Island, but the agreement to use the route made with the Persian Government lapsed in 1932 when the Persian Government attempted to use the continuation of rights to the facility as leverage to gain British recognition for the Persian claim to the Tunbs Islands - a claim the British refused to countenance. As a consequence, a Southern route was sought. The choice of facilities was complicated by the introduction of the larger Handley Page HP 42 aircraft, (named Heracles, Hanno, Horatius, Helena, Hengist, Horsa, Hannibal and Hadrian) which had a longer range, higher speed and more load capacity but which required a landing strip.

Negotiations with several Trucial Sheikhs resulted in British offers to establish a presence being rejected. A site at Dibba, on the East Coast, was scouted and briefly considered - and would have provided a welcome relief to the harried Al Qasimi Wali of Dibba, who was under aggressive pressure from both the Sharqiyin and Shihuh tribes. However the Dibba site was judged impractical and a location outside the coastal town of Sharjah was selected. A backup landing strip at Kalba on the east coast was also proposed at the time and, in fact, would eventually be implemented - leading to the recognition of Kalba as a Trucial State in its own right.

Sharjah's Ruler, Sultan bin Saqr Al Qasimi, agreed in a letter to the British Resident in the Persian Gulf, Hugh Biscoe - with reservations - to host the airfield. However, Biscoe was later to find Sultan bin Saqr had changed his mind and no longer supported the proposal. Arriving in Sharjah on 3 May 1932, Biscoe found Sultan bin Saqr absolutely opposed to signing any such agreement. Facing staunch opposition from members of the ruling family to any move that would establish a direct British presence in Sharjah, Sultan bin Saqr was bolstered by his forceful father in law, Abdulrahman Al Shamsi, and by Biscoe calling in a flight of Westland Wapitis to demonstrate British might. Sultan bin Saqr held out in negotiations until he had gained assurances that the Bombay and Persia Steam Navigation Company steamer service to Dubai would also route through Sharjah, providing income for the town's traders.

The negotiations between the British and Sultan bin Saqr were briefly interrupted when Biscoe suffered a heart attack and died at sea en route to Sharjah. Negotiations were recommenced by Harold Dickson, who had left Kuwait (where he was British Political Agent) to accompany Biscoe as an Arabic-speaking colleague. Dickson recounts at times having to be rude during drawn out and exhaustive negotiations, noting he had "told the Sheikh quite openly that it was impossible for me to continue business in an atmosphere which resembled that of chattering women, rather than the deliberations of serious men."

=== Agreement ===
An agreement was made on 22 June 1932 with the Ruler, Sultan bin Saqr Al Qasimi, which secured him a monthly rental of 800 Rupees for landing rights and fees and a personal subsidy of 500 Rupees. Sultan bin Saqr agreed to build a rest-house for crew and passengers which was fortified against "possible but unlikely raids by bedouin" according to the 1937 documentary film Air Outpost, which featured Sharjah's airport. The ruler also supplied a number of armed men as guards.

The rest house would remain the property of the Ruler, but would be leased to Imperial Airways. It would be used to house company staff and passengers who would not, without the Sheikh's permission, be allowed to visit the town of Sharjah. The Ruler would allow the import of fuel and other resources free of taxation and would provide thirty-five guards and two head guards to provide protection ‘as far as possible for marauders from outside my jurisdiction’. Sultan bin Saqr would receive monthly payments of twenty rupees per guard and forty rupees for the head guards, 800 rupees for the air station (commencing from first landing) and 300 rupees for the rest house. The funds for the construction work would be advanced to Sultan bin Saqr and these would be offset by rental income.

In addition, Sultan bin Saqr was to be granted a personal subsidy of 500 rupees per month and a landing fee of five rupees for each commercial aeroplane landing. RAF aeroplanes were to be exempt from this charge. The company was only to deal with the Sheikh through the Residency Agent (Isa bin Abdullatif Al Serkal was a co-signatory to the agreement) and the renewable agreement was for a duration of eleven years.

At 4 p.m. on 5 October 1932, the first westbound Imperial Airways flight arrived from Gwadar to Sharjah, carrying four passengers on the Handley Page HP42 aircraft ‘Hanno’. The passengers slept in tents, the fortified rest house of Al Mahatta was not to be finished until 1937.

=== Overnight stop ===
Sharjah was an overnight stop between Bahrain and Karachi on the Imperial Airways Eastern Route from Croydon Airport, Croydon, United Kingdom to Eagle Farm Airport, Brisbane, Australia. It was the first British establishment on the Trucial Coast. The route was originally flown by Handley Page HP42s, with two weekly flights landing in Sharjah on Sunday and Wednesday evenings on the outbound flight and Wednesday and Saturday evenings on the return flight.

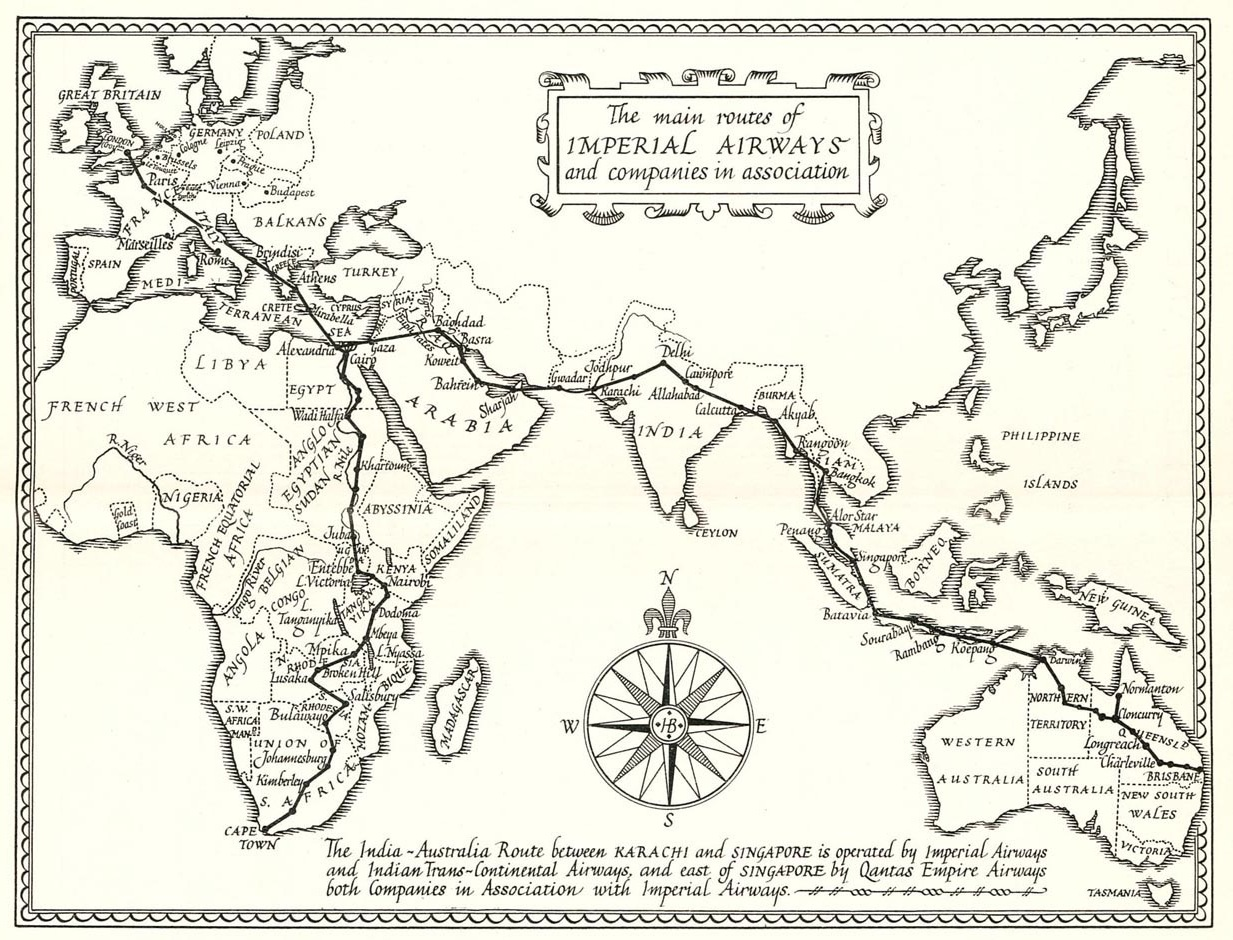
The Imperial Airways Empire Route. Mahatta was a key overnight stop on the route to and from Asia and Australia.

A backup landing strip was established in Kalba in August 1936, resulting in Said Bin Hamad Al Qasimi being recognised by the British as a Trucial Ruler.

By 1938, Sharjah was no longer an overnight stop on the route although the Imperial Airways flying boat service from Sydney to London included an overnight stop in Dubai, following the establishment of Civil Air Agreements with Dubai's ruler. The outbreak of skirmishing between Dubai and Sharjah in 1940 threatened the security of Sharjah's airport and led to unusual intervention by the British political agent in a land-based dispute: the British had previously restricted their interests and treaties purely to maritime affairs. The daily bus with travellers on Imperial Airways who had landed in Dubai and were due to overnight at Mahatta Fort passed between the opposing Dubai and Sharjah forces and a daily ceasefire guaranteed their safe passage.

The airport was used extensively during World War II by the RAF, and a new agreement was made with the Ruler of Sharjah establishing an RAF base, which remained in use through to British withdrawal from the UAE in 1971.

No longer in use by Imperial Airways (or its successor BOAC), in 1951, it became the home of the Trucial Oman Scouts.

The airstrip remained in constant use until the development of the current Sharjah International Airport in 1977.

The fort building became the Seaface Hotel, then from 1973 was used as a police station, before falling into disrepair. It was restored in the late 1990s to open as a museum in 2000.

== 1937 Film: Air Outpost ==
Produced in 1937 by documentary maker Paul Rotha for Strand Films, Air Outpost set out to tell the story of "24 hours at the airport and city of Sharjah, on the Persian Gulf". The film, featuring a score by British composer William Alywn, forms a rare and important historical document of Sharjah and the airport and fort at Mahatta which were at the time, according to the film, "A mile away from the Arab city of Sharjah" and which are now in its centre.

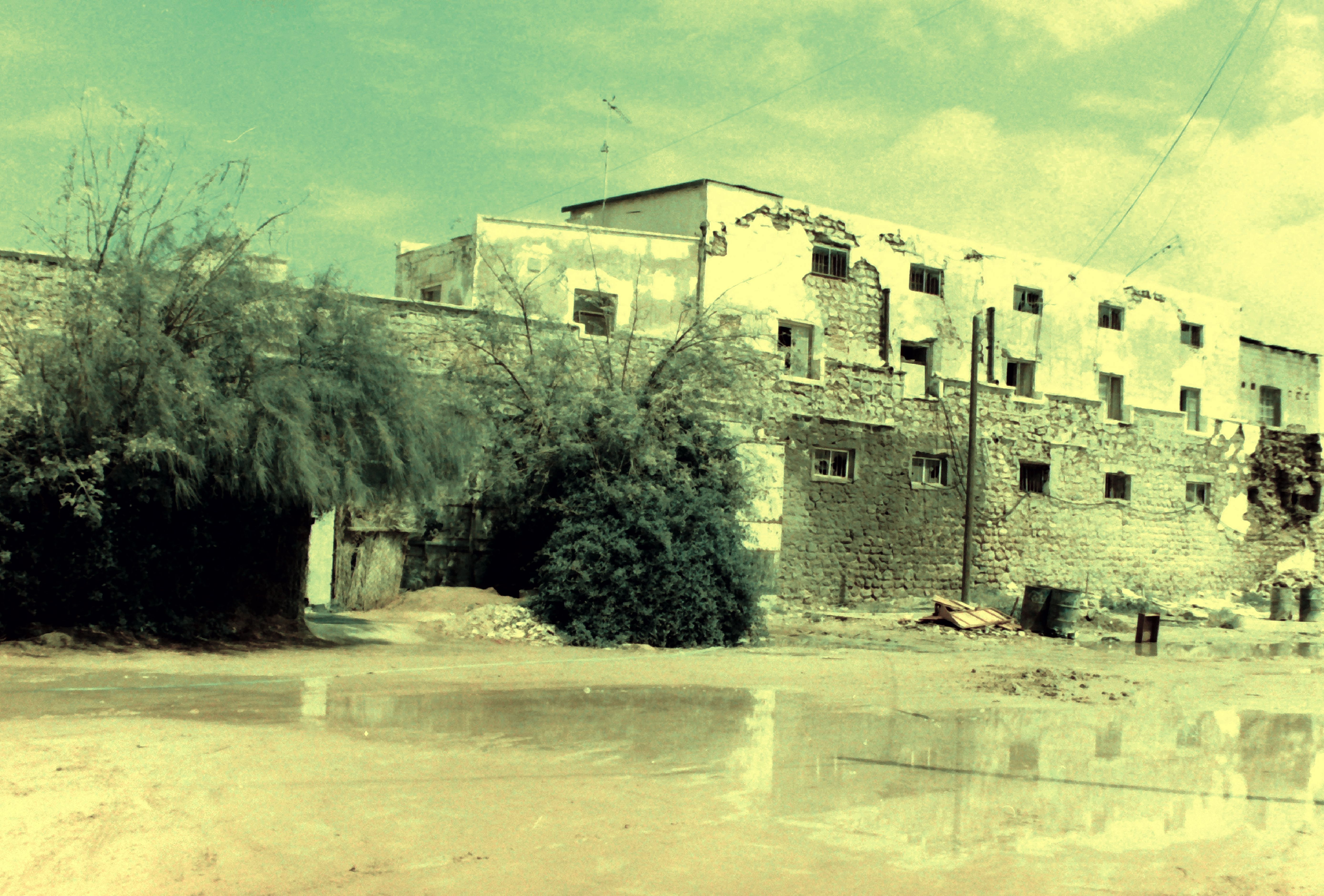
Mahatta Fort in the early 1990s, prior to restoration.

Although dated 1937, the film itself was actually shot in November 1936, Rotha having picked Sharjah for his film as he had travelled the Imperial Airways route a month after its inauguration and before the Mahatta Fort had been built, consequently sleeping in tents.

== Sharjah English School ==
Sharjah English School, the first British curriculum school in Sharjah, saw its first pupils housed at Mahatta Fort in September 1974. The fort was by then encircled by RAF Sharjah and the classrooms had no glass windows, so the children had to cover their ears each time a jet landed. The school moved to a purpose-built campus in the Dasman area of Sharjah in February 1975.

== Al Mahatta Museum ==
On 14 March 2000, Al Mahatta Museum was opened, to celebrate the history of flight in the UAE and the region. It also contains a display of the first cinema in the Gulf region, inaugurated in 1945. As of June 2025, the fort was closed for renovation.

=== Aircraft formerly on display ===
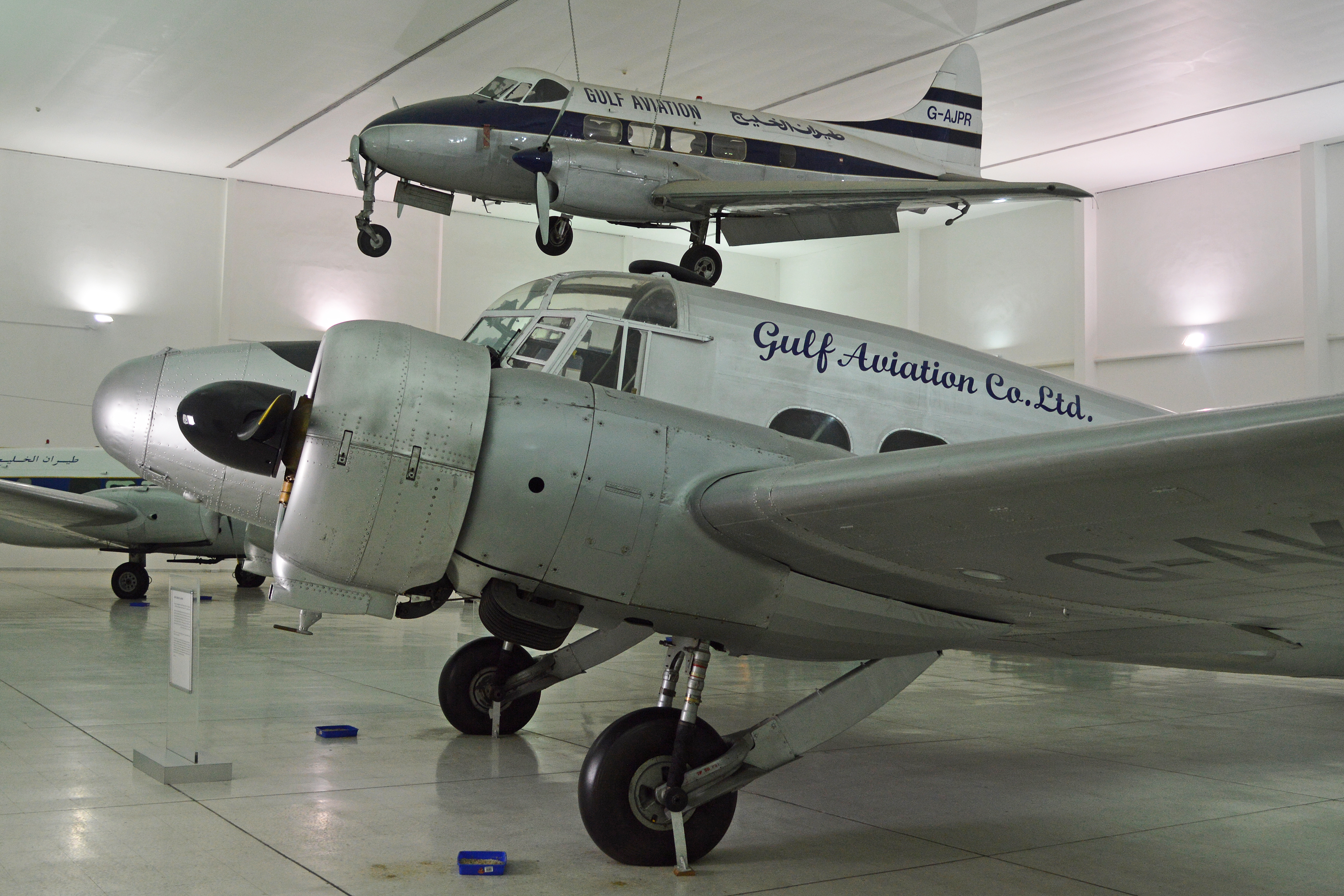
de Havilland Dove and Avro Anson at the museum

- Auster Autocrat G-AJRE
- Avro Anson 19 G-AKVW TX183
- de Havilland Comet G-AMXA/XK-655 (forward fuselage)
- de Havilland Dove G-AJPR
- de Havilland Heron 1B G-ANFE S/no 14034
- Douglas DC-3 G-AMZZ
- Super VC10 5X-UVJ (forward fuselage)

== Gallery ==
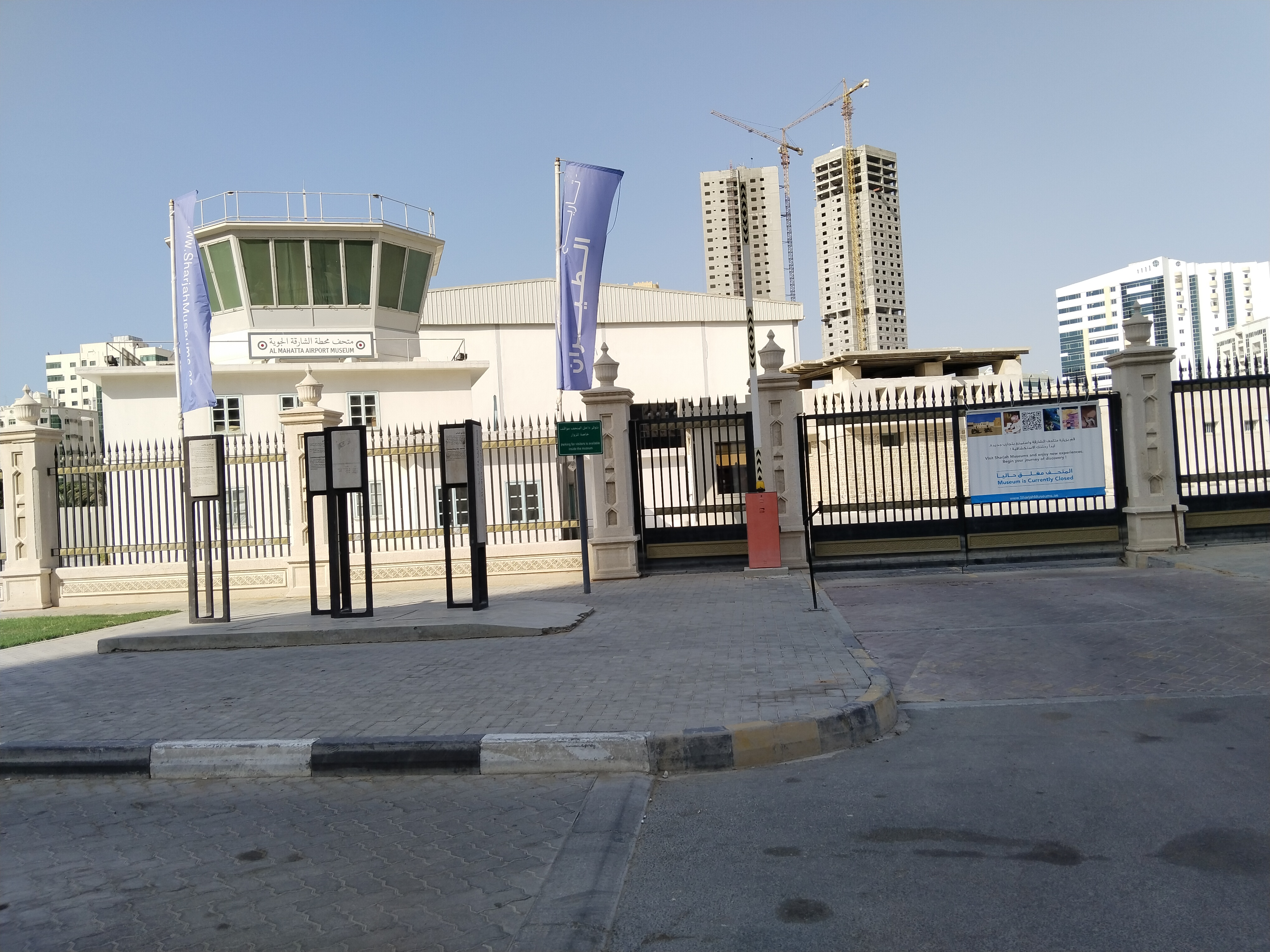
Al Mahatta Fort Main Entrance

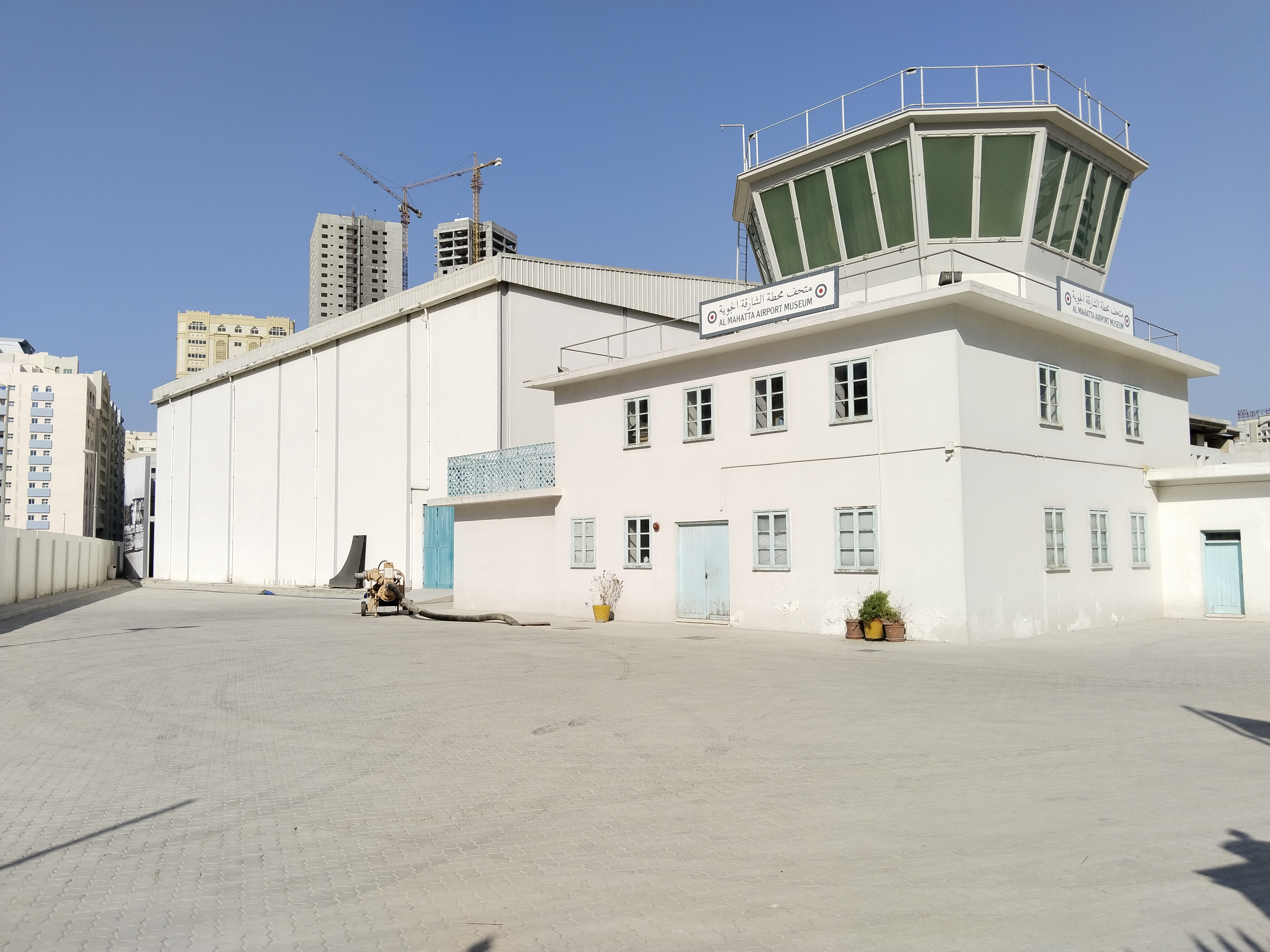
Al Mahatta Fort Air Traffic Control Tower

== See also ==
- Sharjah Fort
