= Cradle of Genius =

1961 film

- Directed by: Paul Rotha
- Produced by: Tom Hayes; Jim O'Connor
- Cinematography: Wolfgang Suschitzky
- Distributed by: Rank Organisation
- Release date: 1961
- Running time: 25 minutes
- Country: Ireland
- Language: English

Cradle of Genius is a 1961 Irish short documentary film directed by Paul Rotha on the history of the Abbey Theatre. It was nominated for an Academy Award for Best Documentary Short.

== Cast ==
- Eileen Crowe
- Maureen Delany
- Barry Fitzgerald
- Siobhán McKenna
