= No Resting Place =

1951 film

- Opening titles
- Directed by: Paul Rotha
- Screenplay by: Colin Lesslie; Paul Rotha; Michael Orrom
- Produced by: Colin Lesslie
- Starring: Michael Gough; Eithne Dunne; Noel Purcell
- Cinematography: Wolfgang Suschitzky
- Edited by: Michael Orrom
- Music by: William Alwyn
- Production company: Colin Lesslie Productions
- Release date: 1951
- Running time: 86 minutes
- Country: United Kingdom
- Language: English

No Resting Place is a 1951 British film directed by Paul Rotha and starring Michael Gough, Eithne Dunne and Noel Purcell. It was written by Colin Lesslie, Rotha, and Michael Orrom based on the 1948 novel of the same title by Ian Niall, and produced by Colin Lesslie Productions. It is noteworthy for its early use of location shooting and for bringing the acting style of Dublin's Abbey Theatre to the screen, as well as being the fiction feature debut of Rotha and cinematographer Wolfgang Suschitzky.

== Plot summary ==
An Irish Traveller is relentlessly pursued by a policeman after accidentally killing a gamekeeper.

== Cast ==
- Michael Gough as Alec Kyle
- Eithne Dunne as Meg Kyle
- Noel Purcell as Garda Mannigan
- Brian O'Higgins as Tam
- Jack MacGowran as Billy
- Christy Lawrence as Paddy
- Diana Campbell

== Production ==
It was the first fiction film directed by Rotha, formerly a documentary maker. The film draws on Rotha's documentary background as well as Italian neo-Realism, with scenes of rural and domestic life particularly showing the influence of his documentaries. It was made for a low budget of 60,000 GBP.

It was shot entirely on location in Wicklow, Ireland by cinematographer Wolfgang Suschitzky. It was the first film as cinematographer for Suschitzky, who went on to photograph films including Get Carter.

The soundtrack was by William Alwyn, using a small ensemble of traditional Irish instruments: harp, flute, and violin.

Apart from stars Michael Gough and Noel Purcell, Rotha drew the cast from Irish theatres including the Abbey Theatre and Irish radio. It is regarded by some critics as part of an Abbey school of filmmaking that aimed to mimic the realism of contemporary mainland-European film.

== Reception ==
The Monthly Film Bulletin wrote: "In its descriptions of the tinker community No Resting Place achieves a simple authenticity, draws fresh and sympathetic portraits of the Kyle family, and brings vivid pictorial detail to its impression of the Irish landscape. The second half of the film is rather overwhelmed by the demands of the plot; the figure of Mannigan is at once too complex and too arbitrary for the rest of the drama ...Filmed entirely on location in Ireland (and beautifully photographed by Wolfgang Suschitzky), the film's points of interest are numerous: it is the first feature film of the distinguished documentary director, Paul Rotha: it is one of the few British attempts at an intimate realistic work shot against natural backgrounds, and derives in method from the post-war Italian cinema."

The Manchester Guardian applauded the truthfulness of its depiction of the Irish countryside and Gough's performance, and commended it for a more truthful portrayal of Ireland than the traditional stage Irish cliches, while suggesting it could do with a bit more poetry.

Variety wrote: "Scenically, it is a film of merit. Photography captures the Irish atmosphere, and Rotha's direction never tends to whip up a false pace. The story is full of leisurely incident and is told in a-restrained, dignified key. ... Michael Gough, as the tinker, and Eithne Dunne, as his wife, contribute performances that compel by their sincerity. Noel Purcell is too much of a heavy as the civic guard, but the remainder of the cast convinces with moving portrayals."

Ian Johnson praises moments of touching emotional clarity but criticises "inept scripting" and a poor ending, probably imposed by censors.

== Accolades ==
At the 1952 British Academy Film Awards, it was nominated for Best Film from any Source and Best British Film.
