= British Academy Film Awards =

Annual awards for cinematic achievements

- Current: 79th British Academy Film Awards
- Awarded for: The best in film
- Country: United Kingdom
- Presented by: British Academy of Film and Television Arts
- First award: 29 May 1949; 77 years ago
- Website: bafta.org

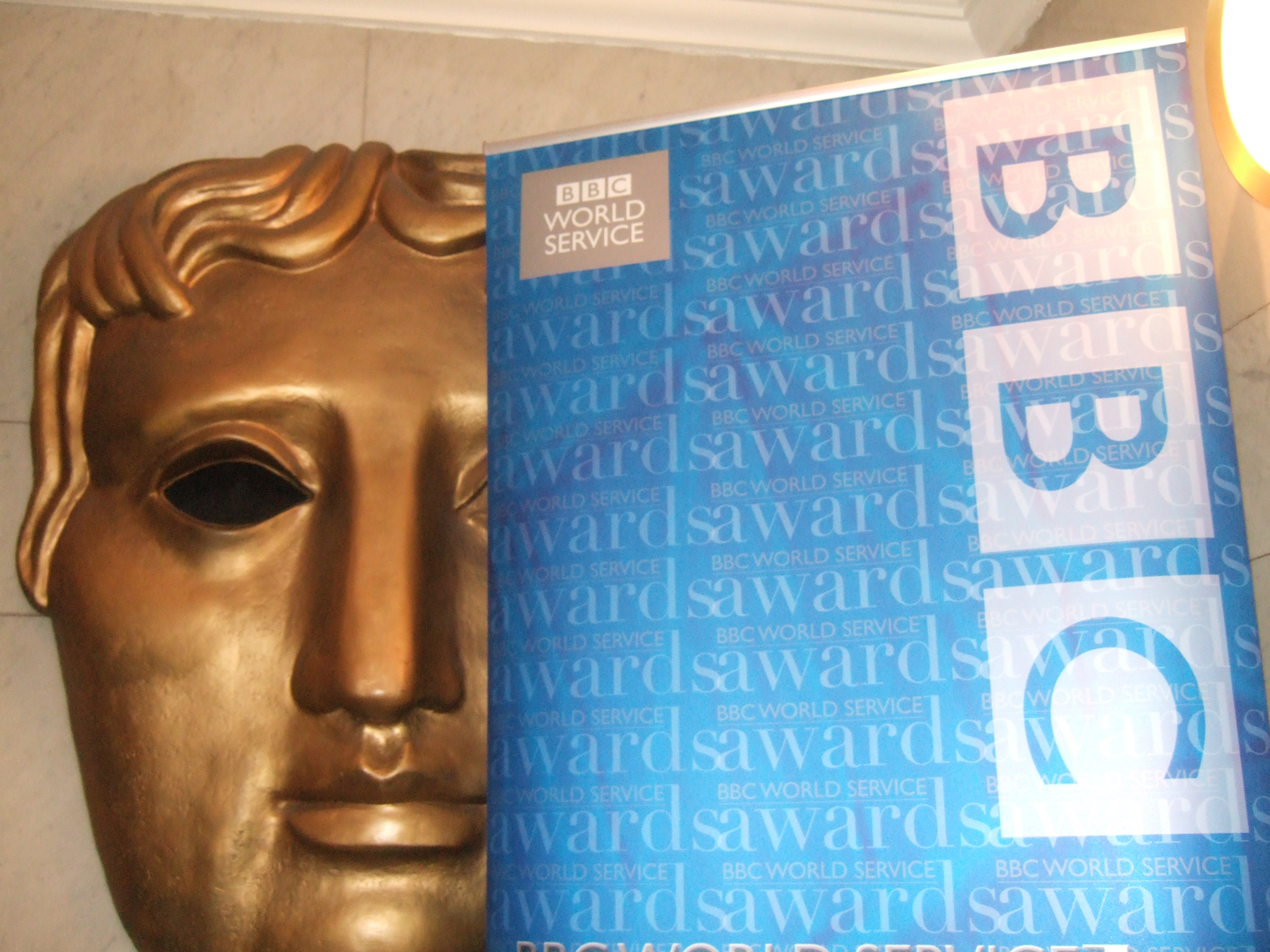
BAFTA mask and the logo of the BBC (broadcaster of the awards since 1956)

The British Academy Film Awards (the BAFTAs or BAFTA Awards; officially the EE British Academy Film Awards since 2013) is an annual film award show hosted by the British Academy of Film and Television Arts (BAFTA) to honour the best British and international film contributions. The ceremony was first held in London at Odeon Luxe Leicester Square Cinema, then the Royal Opera House from 2007 to 2016. The event was held at the Royal Albert Hall from 2017 to 2022, before moving to the Royal Festival Hall for 2023. The statue awarded to recipients depicts a theatrical mask. The BAFTA Awards are recognised internationally as the highest honour in British cinema, equivalent to the BAFTA TV Awards for television, Laurence Olivier Awards for theatre, and the BRIT Awards for music. The BAFTA Film Awards are considered equivalent to the Academy Awards.

The first BAFTA Awards ceremony was held in 1949, and the ceremony was first broadcast on the BBC in 1956 with Vivien Leigh as the host. The ceremony was initially held in April or May; since 2001, it typically takes place in February. The BAFTAs have been sponsored by EE since 2013.

== History ==
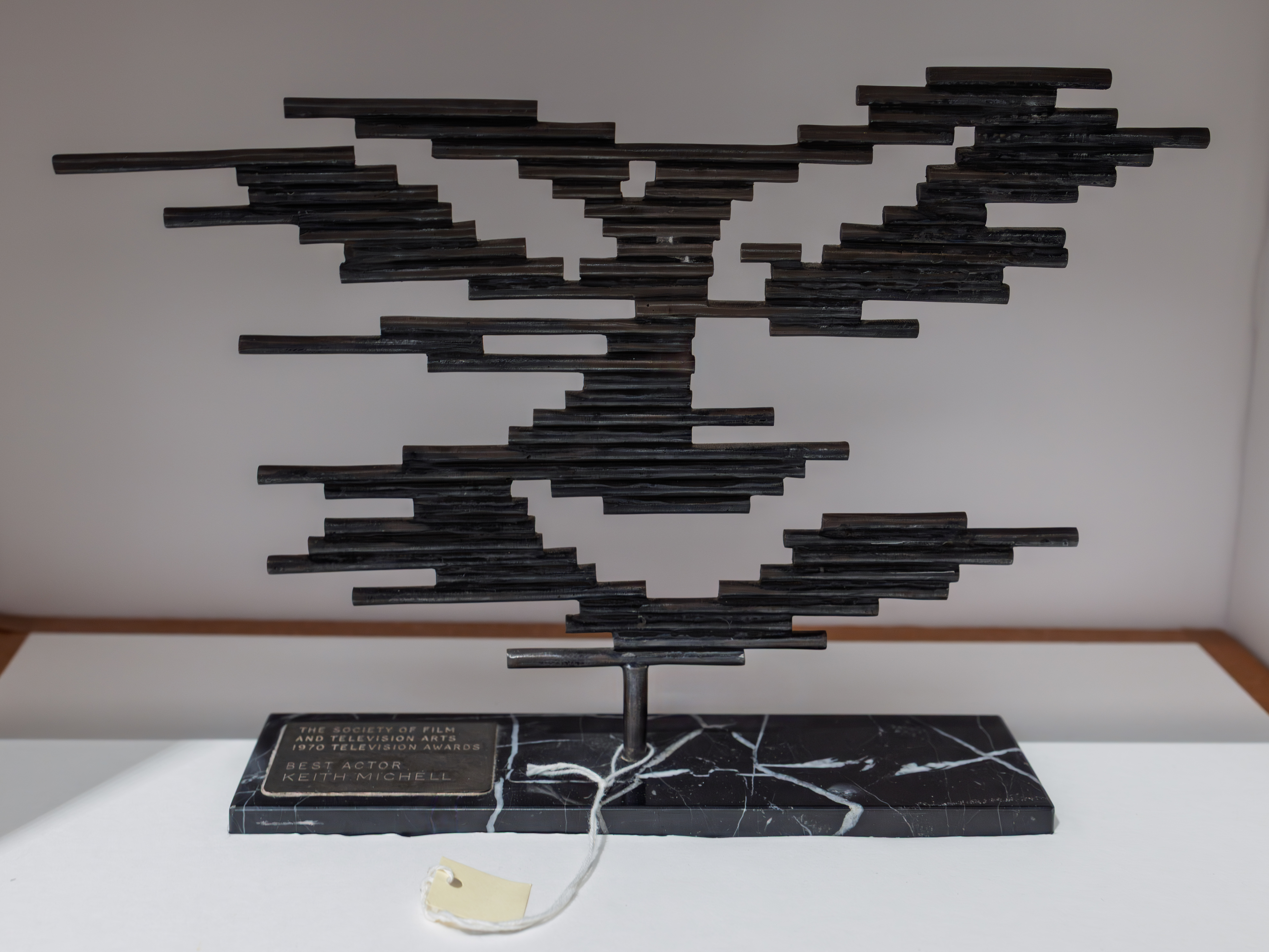
Society of Film and Television Arts award from 1970

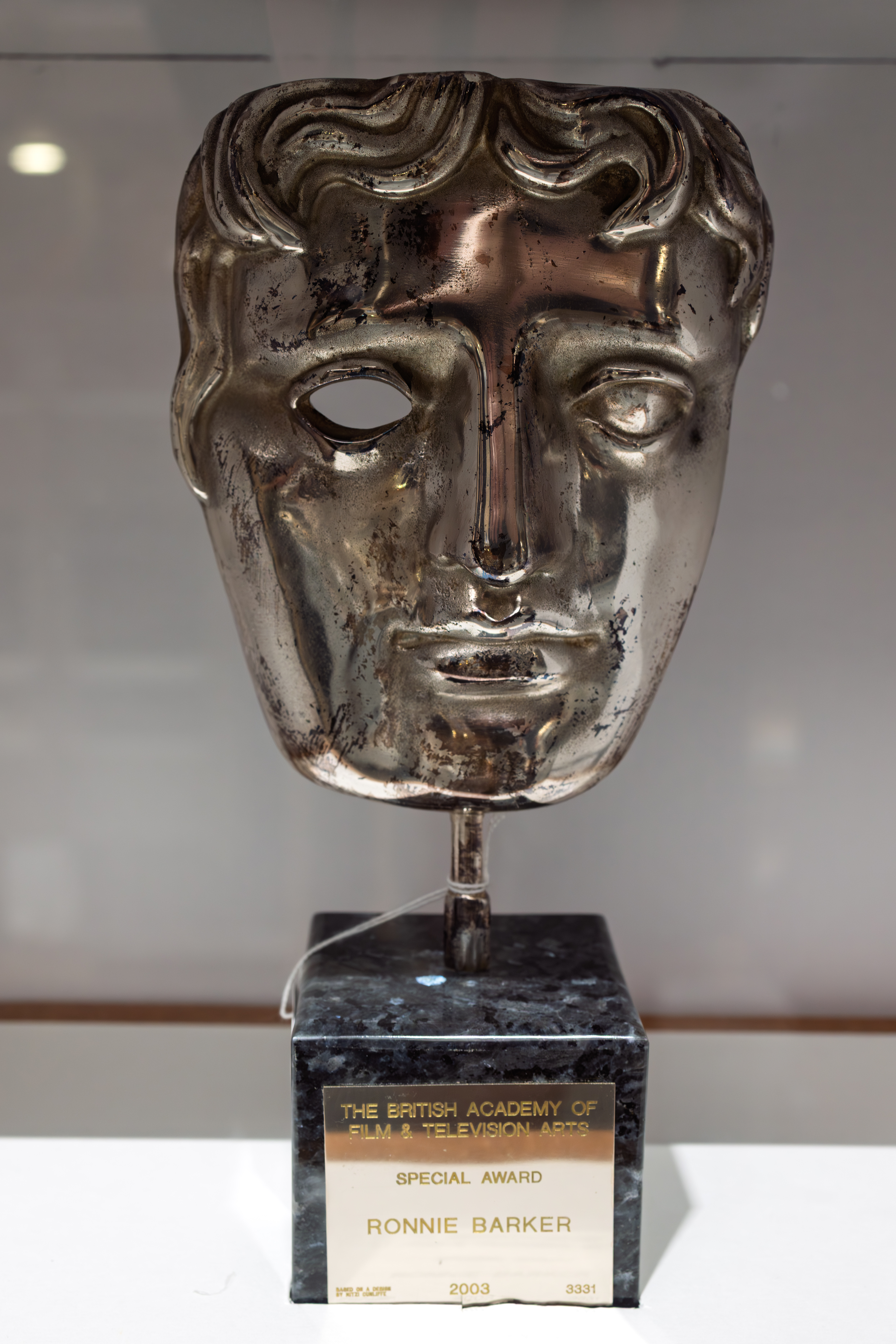
BAFTA special lifetime achievement award presented to Ronnie Barker

The British Academy of Film and Television Arts (BAFTA) was founded in 1947 as The British Film Academy, by David Lean, Alexander Korda, Carol Reed, Charles Laughton, Roger Manvell, Laurence Olivier, Emeric Pressburger, Michael Powell, Michael Balcon, and other major figures of the British film industry. In 1958, the Academy merged with The Guild of Television Producers and Directors to form The Society of Film and Television, which eventually became The British Academy of Film and Television Arts in 1976.

The stated charitable purpose of BAFTA is to "support, develop and promote the art forms of the moving image, by identifying and rewarding excellence, inspiring practitioners, and benefiting the public". In addition to high-profile awards ceremonies, BAFTA runs a year-round programme of educational events, including film screenings and tribute evenings. BAFTA is supported by a membership of about 6,000 people from the film, television, and video game industries.

The Academy's awards are in the form of a theatrical mask designed by American sculptor Mitzi Cunliffe, in response to a commission from the Guild of Television Producers in 1955.

Prince Philip, Duke of Edinburgh was the host of the ceremony as the first president of BAFTA in 1960, 1963, and 1965.

Princess Anne presented the first Fellowship Award to Alfred Hitchcock in 1971, and subsequently attended the ceremony several times as President of BAFTA between 1973 and 2001.

== Annual ceremony ==
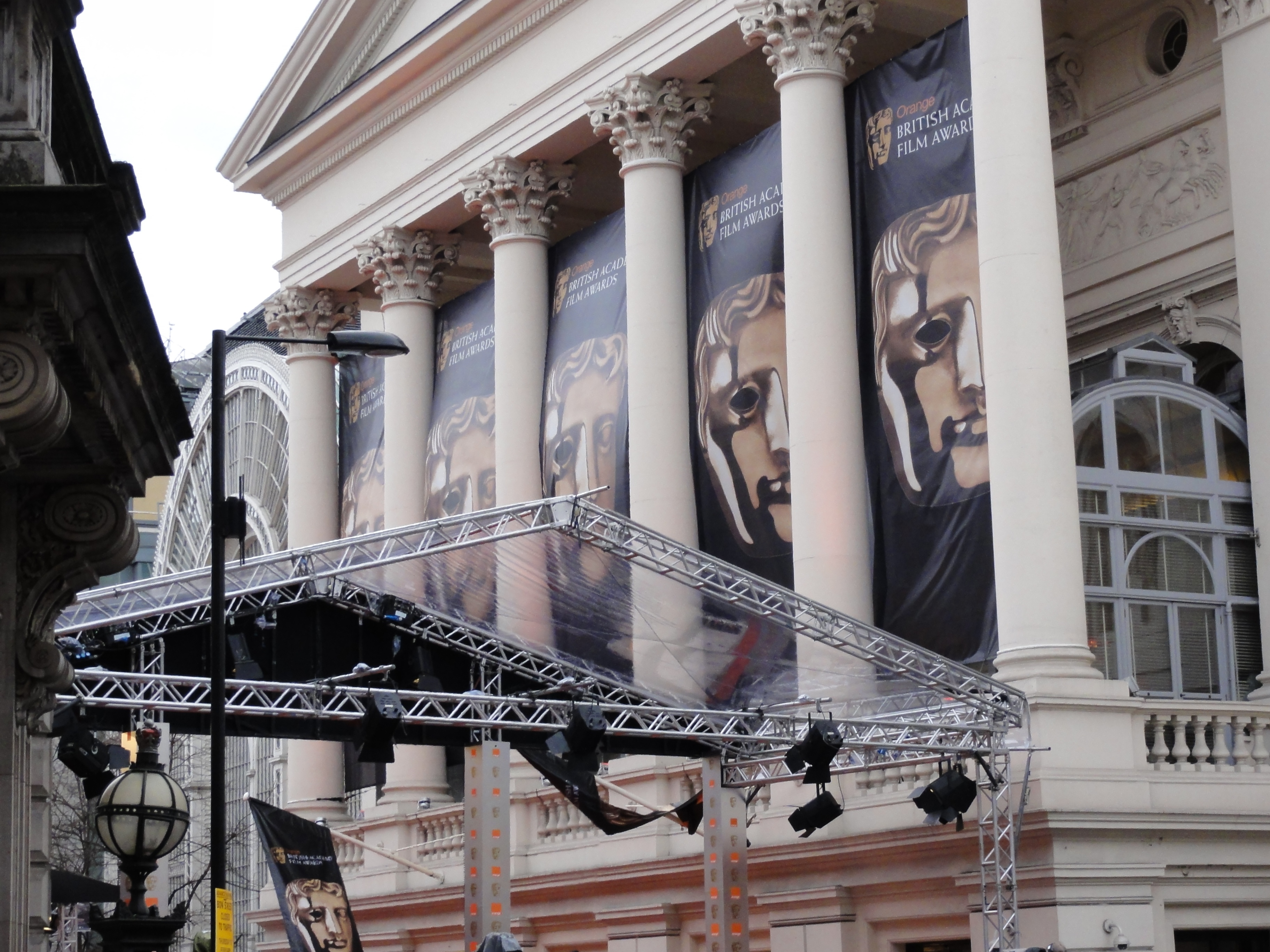
The location for the 2011 ceremony

The ceremony previously took place in April or May, but since 2001 it has been held in February in order to precede the Academy Awards. Most of the awards are open to all nationalities, though there are awards for Outstanding British Film and Outstanding Debut by a British Writer, Producer or Director. Only UK films are eligible for the categories of The British Short Film and British Short Animation awards.

During each annual ceremony, BAFTA pauses in memoriam to pay tribute to those in the industry who have died over the past 12 months, showcasing a montage of images accompanied by music.

William, Prince of Wales attended the ceremony for the first time in 2010 after being named president of BAFTA, and has attended frequently since, including together with Catherine, Princess of Wales. He presented the BAFTA Fellowship award to Mel Brooks in 2017 and Kathleen Kennedy in 2020.

=== Broadcast ===
Historically, the Awards ceremony was broadcast on British television on a same-day delay, and later distributed internationally. The first broadcast was on the BBC in 1956, with Vivien Leigh (who would present an award to her ex husband Sir Laurence Olivier) as the host. It has been broadcast in colour since 1970. In the US the show was previously broadcast with a delay on BBC America until 2021, after which it has broadcast on streaming service BritBox. In 2023, the BAFTA Film Awards included a live telecast for its major award categories during the culmination of the ceremony.

=== Location ===
The award ceremony is held in London. From 2000 to 2007, the ceremonies took place at the flagship Odeon cinema in Leicester Square. Between 2008 and 2016, the ceremonies took place at the Royal Opera House. The 70th Awards in 2017, and subsequent ceremonies up to the 75th Awards in 2022, were held at the Royal Albert Hall.

For the 76th British Academy Film Awards in 2023, it was announced that the ceremony would be moved to the Royal Festival Hall as part of a new multi-year deal between BAFTA and the Southbank Centre, bringing the Film Awards in-line with the British Academy Television Awards and British Academy Games Awards, which were already held there.

=== Sponsorship ===
Until 2012, the mobile telephone network Orange sponsored the awards. Orange's parent company, EE, took over the sponsorship of the event from 2013.

== Award categories ==
- BAFTA Award for Best Film: since 1948
- BAFTA Award for Outstanding British Film: 1948–1968, 1992–present
- BAFTA Award for Best Film Not in the English Language: since 1983
- BAFTA Award for Best Documentary: 1948–1989, 2012–present
- BAFTA Award for Best Animated Film: since 2006
- BAFTA Award for Best Children's & Family Film: since 2025
- BAFTA Award for Best Short Film: since 1980
- BAFTA Award for Best Short Animation: since 1990
- BAFTA Award for Outstanding Debut by a British Writer, Director or Producer: since 1998
- BAFTA Award for Best Direction: since 1968
- BAFTA Award for Best Adapted Screenplay: since 1984
- BAFTA Award for Best Original Screenplay: since 1984
- BAFTA Award for Best Actor in a Leading Role: since 1968
- BAFTA Award for Best Actress in a Leading Role: since 1968
- BAFTA Award for Best Actor in a Supporting Role: since 1969
- BAFTA Award for Best Actress in a Supporting Role: since 1969
- BAFTA Award for Best Cinematography: since 1969
- BAFTA Award for Best Editing: since 1968
- BAFTA Award for Best Costume Design: since 1969
- BAFTA Award for Best Production Design: since 1969
- BAFTA Award for Best Makeup and Hair: since 1983
- BAFTA Award for Best Original Music: since 1969
- BAFTA Award for Best Sound: since 1969
- BAFTA Award for Best Special Visual Effects: since 1983
- BAFTA Award for Best Casting: since 2020
- BAFTA Rising Star Award: since 2006

=== Retired awards ===
- BAFTA Award for Most Promising Newcomer to Leading Film Roles (awarded 1952–1984)
- BAFTA Award for Best British Screenplay (awarded 1955–1968)
- BAFTA Award for Best Screenplay (awarded 1969–1983)
- BAFTA Award for Best British Actor (awarded 1952–1967)
- BAFTA Award for Best Foreign Actor (awarded 1952–1967)
- BAFTA Award for Best British Actress (awarded 1952–1967)
- BAFTA Award for Best Foreign Actress (awarded 1952–1967)
- BAFTA Award for Best Original Song (awarded 1983–1985)
- BAFTA Award for Best Factual Film
- BAFTA Award for Best Fictional Film
- BAFTA Award for Best Short Factual Film
- BAFTA Award for Best Specialised Film
- BAFTA Award for Best Animation (awarded 1955–1982)
- BAFTA John Grierson Award
- BAFTA United Nations Award (awarded 1949–1976)

=== Special awards ===
- BAFTA Fellowship (since 1971)
- Outstanding British Contribution to Cinema Award (known as the Michael Balcon Award from 1979 to 2006)
- Britannia Awards (1989–2019)

== Superlatives ==
=== Acting ===
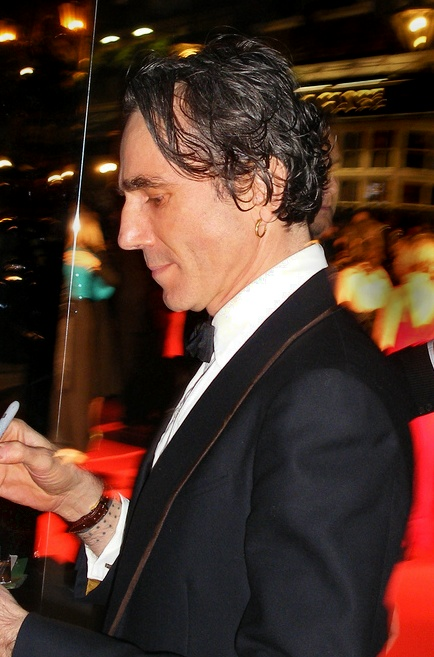
Sir Daniel Day-Lewis at the 2008 BAFTAs. He has received four BAFTA Awards for Best Actor, the second most in the category.

Superlative	Male Actor	#	Female Actor	#
Most Nominations	Albert Finney	9	Judi Dench; Meryl Streep	15
Most Wins	Peter Finch	5	Judi Dench	6

Note: Dench and Finney's tally of wins and nominations includes those received in the Most Promising Newcomer category.

==== Actors nominated twice in the same category in the same year ====
Nine actors have received dual nominations in the same category in a single year at the BAFTA Film Awards.

Year (Ceremony)	Actor/Actress	Category	Film	Result
1983 (37th)	Michael Caine	Best Actor in a Leading Role	Educating Rita	Won
1983 (37th)	Michael Caine	Best Actor in a Leading Role	The Honorary Consul	Nominated
1992 (46th)	Miranda Richardson	Best Actress in a Supporting Role	Damage	Won
1992 (46th)	Miranda Richardson	Best Actress in a Supporting Role	The Crying Game	Nominated
1993 (47th)	Anthony Hopkins	Best Actor in a Leading Role	The Remains of the Day	Won
1993 (47th)	Anthony Hopkins	Best Actor in a Leading Role	Shadowlands	Nominated
1998 (52nd)	Geoffrey Rush	Best Actor in a Supporting Role	Shakespeare in Love	Won
1998 (52nd)	Geoffrey Rush	Best Actor in a Supporting Role	Elizabeth	Nominated
2003 (57th)	Scarlett Johansson	Best Actress in a Leading Role	Lost in Translation	Won
2003 (57th)	Scarlett Johansson	Best Actress in a Leading Role	Girl with a Pearl Earring	Nominated
2003 (57th)	Sean Penn	Best Actor in a Leading Role	21 Grams	Nominated
2003 (57th)	Sean Penn	Best Actor in a Leading Role	Mystic River	Nominated
2004 (58th)	Kate Winslet	Best Actress in a Leading Role	Eternal Sunshine of the Spotless Mind	Nominated
2004 (58th)	Kate Winslet	Best Actress in a Leading Role	Finding Neverland	Nominated
2005 (59th)	George Clooney	Best Actor in a Supporting Role	Good Night, and Good Luck	Nominated
2005 (59th)	George Clooney	Best Actor in a Supporting Role	Syriana	Nominated
2008 (62nd)	Kate Winslet	Best Actress in a Leading Role	The Reader	Won
2008 (62nd)	Kate Winslet	Best Actress in a Leading Role	Revolutionary Road	Nominated
2019 (73rd)	Margot Robbie	Best Actress in a Supporting Role	Bombshell	Nominated
2019 (73rd)	Margot Robbie	Best Actress in a Supporting Role	Once Upon a Time in Hollywood	Nominated

Notes

- Michael Caine was the first actor to receive dual nominations in the same category in a single year.
- The only ceremony with multiple actors double nominated in the same category was the 57th, with Sean Penn and Scarlett Johansson. Penn became the first actor to win neither nomination, while Johansson became the first (and remains the only) to have neither performance nominated for the corresponding Oscar.
- Kate Winslet is the only actor to receive dual nominations twice.

==== Actors nominated in two different categories for the same performance in the same year ====
Twenty three actors have received two nominations for the same performance in a single year at the BAFTA Film Awards.

Year (Ceremony)	Actor/Actress	Category	Film	Result
1960 (14th)	Albert Finney	Best British Actor	Saturday Night and Sunday Morning	Nominated
1960 (14th)	Albert Finney	Most Promising Newcomer to Leading Film Roles	Saturday Night and Sunday Morning	Won
1975 (29th)	Valerie Perrine	Best Actress in a Leading Role	Lenny	Nominated
1975 (29th)	Valerie Perrine	Most Promising Newcomer to Leading Film Roles	Lenny	Won
1976 (30th)	Jodie Foster	Best Actress in a Supporting Role	Bugsy Malone / Taxi Driver	Won
1976 (30th)	Jodie Foster	Most Promising Newcomer to Leading Film Roles	Bugsy Malone / Taxi Driver	Won
1978 (32nd)	Brad Davis	Best Actor in a Leading Role	Midnight Express	Nominated
1978 (32nd)	Brad Davis	Most Promising Newcomer to Leading Film Roles	Midnight Express	Nominated
1980 (34th)	Judy Davis	Best Actress in a Leading Role	My Brilliant Career	Won
1980 (34th)	Judy Davis	Most Promising Newcomer to Leading Film Roles	My Brilliant Career	Won
1982 (36th)	Ben Kingsley	Best Actor in a Leading Role	Gandhi	Won
1982 (36th)	Ben Kingsley	Most Promising Newcomer to Leading Film Roles	Gandhi	Won
1983 (37th)	Phyllis Logan	Best Actress in a Leading Role	Another Time, Another Place	Nominated
1983 (37th)	Phyllis Logan	Most Promising Newcomer to Leading Film Roles	Another Time, Another Place	Won
1983 (37th)	Julie Walters	Best Actress in a Leading Role	Educating Rita	Won
1983 (37th)	Julie Walters	Most Promising Newcomer to Leading Film Roles	Educating Rita	Nominated
1984 (38th)	Haing S. Ngor	Best Actor in a Leading Role	The Killing Fields	Won
1984 (38th)	Haing S. Ngor	Most Promising Newcomer to Leading Film Roles	The Killing Fields	Won
2007 (61st)	Ellen Page	Best Actress in a Leading Role	Juno	Nominated
2007 (61st)	Ellen Page	BAFTA Rising Star Award	Juno	Nominated
2009 (63rd)	Carey Mulligan	Best Actress in a Leading Role	An Education	Won
2009 (63rd)	Carey Mulligan	BAFTA Rising Star Award	An Education	Nominated
2010 (64th)	Andrew Garfield	Best Actor in a Supporting Role	The Social Network	Nominated
2010 (64th)	Andrew Garfield	BAFTA Rising Star Award	The Social Network	Nominated
2013 (67th)	Lupita Nyong'o	Best Actress in a Supporting Role	12 Years a Slave	Nominated
2013 (67th)	Lupita Nyong'o	BAFTA Rising Star Award	12 Years a Slave	Nominated
2015 (69th)	Brie Larson	Best Actress in a Leading Role	Room	Won
2015 (69th)	Brie Larson	BAFTA Rising Star Award	Room	Nominated
2017 (71st)	Timothée Chalamet	Best Actor in a Leading Role	Call Me by Your Name	Nominated
2017 (71st)	Timothée Chalamet	BAFTA Rising Star Award	Call Me by Your Name	Nominated
2017 (71st)	Daniel Kaluuya	Best Actor in a Leading Role	Get Out	Nominated
2017 (71st)	Daniel Kaluuya	BAFTA Rising Star Award	Get Out	Won
2020 (74th)	Bukky Bakray	Best Actress in a Leading Role	Rocks	Nominated
2020 (74th)	Bukky Bakray	BAFTA Rising Star Award	Rocks	Won
2021 (75th)	Ariana DeBose	Best Actress in a Supporting Role	West Side Story	Won
2021 (75th)	Ariana DeBose	BAFTA Rising Star Award	West Side Story	Nominated
2021 (75th)	Kodi Smit-McPhee	Best Actor in a Supporting Role	The Power of The Dog	Nominated
2021 (75th)	Kodi Smit-McPhee	BAFTA Rising Star Award	The Power of The Dog	Nominated
2023 (77th)	Jacob Elordi	Best Actor in a Supporting Role	Saltburn	Nominated
2023 (77th)	Jacob Elordi	BAFTA Rising Star Award	Saltburn	Nominated
2024 (78th)	Mikey Madison	Best Actress in a Leading Role	Anora	Won
2024 (78th)	Mikey Madison	BAFTA Rising Star Award	Anora	Nominated
2025 (79th)	Robert Aramayo	Best Actor in a Leading Role	I Swear	Won
2025 (79th)	Robert Aramayo	BAFTA Rising Star Award	I Swear	Won
2025 (79th)	Chase Infiniti	Best Actress in a Leading Role	One Battle After Another	Nominated
2025 (79th)	Chase Infiniti	BAFTA Rising Star Award	One Battle After Another	Nominated

Notes

- Albert Finney was the first actor to receive two nominations for one performance.
- Jodie Foster was the first actor to win both nominations.
- Brad Davis is the only actor to win neither nomination.
- The only ceremony with multiple actors to receive two nominations for one performance was the 37th, with Phyllis Logan and Julie Walters. Logan and Walters were nominated twice against each other, and both won, effectively splitting categories.

=== Directing ===
Superlative	Director	
Most Nominations	Martin Scorsese	10
Most Wins	Woody Allen	2
Most Wins	Joel Coen	2
Most Wins	Alfonso Cuarón	2
Most Wins	Ang Lee	2
Most Wins	Louis Malle	2
Most Wins	Alan Parker	2
Most Wins	Roman Polanski	2
Most Wins	John Schlesinger	2
Most Wins	Peter Weir	2

==== Directors nominated for multiple films in the same year ====
The only director to receive dual nominations in the same year at the BAFTA Film Awards was Steven Soderbergh for Erin Brockovich and Traffic in 2000. Additionally, Sidney Lumet received one joint nomination for Murder on the Orient Express and Serpico in 1974.

=== Other ===
- Most awards won by a single film
  - Butch Cassidy and the Sundance Kid (1969), with 9 wins.
- Most nominations received by a single film
  - Gandhi (1982), with 16 nominations.
- Most awards won by a non English-language film
  - All Quiet on the Western Front (2022), with 7 wins.
- Most nominations received by a non English-language film
  - Crouching Tiger, Hidden Dragon (2000) and All Quiet on the Western Front (2022), with 14 nominations each.
- Most nominations received by an animated film
  - Shrek (2001), with 6 nominations.
- First non-English language film to win Best Film
  - Bicycle Thieves in 1949.
- First non-English language films to be nominated for Best Film
  - Four Steps in the Clouds, Monsieur Vincent and Paisan in 1948.
- First animated film to be nominated for Best Film
  - Shrek (2001) (Note: As of 2026, Shrek remains the only animated film to be nominated in that category.)
- First animated film to win any screenplay categories
  - Shrek (2001), with Best Adapted Screenplay (Note: As of 2025, Shrek remains the only film to win in any screenplay categories.)
- Largest sweep (winning awards in every nominated category)
  - A Man for All Seasons (1966), with 7 wins.
- Most nominations without winning an award
  - Women in Love (1969), Finding Neverland (2004), and Marty Supreme (2025), with 11 nominations each.
- Most total nominations and awards for a person
  - Woody Allen received 24 nominations and won 10 awards.
- Most nominations and awards for a person in a single year
  - Alfonso Cuarón received six nominations and won four awards in 2018.
- Most nominations for a woman in a single year
  - Chloé Zhao received four nominations in 2020.
- Most total awards for a woman
  - Judi Dench and Catherine Martin won six awards each.
- Most total nominations for a woman
  - Sandy Powell received 16 nominations.
- Highest "perfect score"
  - Composer Ennio Morricone has six nominations and six wins.
- Only person to receive every nomination in a category
  - Jocelyn Rickards received both nominations for Best British Costume Design – Black and White in 1967, winning for Mademoiselle.
- Only actor to win a BAFTA for portraying a real BAFTA winner
  - Cate Blanchett won Best Actress in a Supporting Role for portraying Katharine Hepburn in The Aviator (2004).
    - NOTE: Robert Downey Jr. won Best Actor in a Leading Role for portraying Charlie Chaplin in Chaplin (1992). Chaplin received the BAFTA Fellowship, an honorary award, but was never nominated for a competitive BAFTA.
- Only actor to be nominated for a voice-only performance
  - Eddie Murphy nominated for Best Actor in a Supporting Role for voicing Donkey in Shrek (2001).
- Oldest person to win an award
  - James Ivory, age 89 (Best Adapted Screenplay, Call Me by Your Name, 2017).
- Youngest person to win an award
  - Jodie Foster, age 13 (Best Actress in a Supporting Role and Most Promising Newcomer to Leading Film Roles, Bugsy Malone / Taxi Driver, 1976).

== Ceremonies ==
Event	Date(s)	Host(s)	Notes
1st	29 May 1949	—N/a	
2nd	29 May 1949	—N/a	
3rd	29 May 1950	—N/a	
4th	22 February 1951	—N/a	
5th	8 May 1952	—N/a	
6th	5 March 1953	—N/a	
7th	25 March 1954	—N/a	
8th	10 March 1955	Jack Buchanan; Leslie Mitchell; Anthony Havelock-Allan	
9th	1 March 1956	Vivien Leigh	1st LIVE
10th	11 July 1957	—N/a	
11th	6 March 1958	Ian Dalrymple	
11th	6 March 1958	Leslie Mitchell	(2)
12th	18 March 1959	—N/a	
13th	22 March 1960	Prince Philip, Duke of Edinburgh	
14th	6 April 1961	—N/a	
15th	5 April 1962	—N/a	
16th	7 May 1963	Prince Philip, Duke of Edinburgh	(2)
17th	3 April 1964	Anthony Havelock-Allan	(2)
18th	30 March 1965	Prince Philip, Duke of Edinburgh	(3)
19th	23 March 1966	Leslie Caron	
20th	27 April 1967	—N/a	
21st	28 March 1968	—N/a	
22nd	26 March 1969	Lord Mountbatten	
23rd	8 March 1970	David Frost	
24th	4 March 1971	Richard Attenborough	(2)
25th	23 February 1972	Richard Attenborough	(2)
26th	28 February 1973	Michael Parkinson; John Mills	
27th	6 March 1974	Eamonn Andrews; Petula Clark	
28th	26 February 1975	David Niven	
29th	17 March 1976	Diana Rigg	
29th	17 March 1976	Eamonn Andrews	(2)
30th	24 March 1977	Esther Rantzen; Roger Moore	
31st	16 March 1978	Andrew Gardner; Susannah York	
32nd	22 March 1979	Sue Lawley; Michael York	
33rd	20 March 1980	Anna Ford; Edward Fox	
34th	22 March 1981	David Frost	(2)
35th	18 March 1982	Denis Norden	
36th	20 March 1983	Frank Bough; Selina Scott	
37th	25 March 1984	Michael Aspel	
38th	5 March 1985	Terry Wogan	
39th	16 March 1986	Michael Aspel	(2)
40th	22 March 1987	Ronnie Corbett; Ronnie Barker	
41st	20 March 1988	Michael Aspel	(3)
42nd	19 March 1989	David Dimbleby	
42nd	19 March 1989	Anna Ford	(2)
43rd	11 March 1990	Magnus Magnusson; Sally Magnusson	
44th	17 March 1991	Noel Edmonds	
45th	22 March 1992	Michael Aspel	(4)
46th	21 March 1993	Griff Rhys Jones	
47th	15 April 1994	Sheena McDonald	
48th	9 April 1995	Billy Connolly	
49th	23 April 1996	Angus Deayton	
50th	29 April 1997	Lenny Henry	
51st	18 April 1998	Rory Bremner	
52nd	11 April 1999	Jonathan Ross	
53rd	9 April 2000	Jack Docherty	
54th	25 February 2001	Stephen Fry; Mariella Frostrup	
55th	24 February 2002	Stephen Fry	(6)
56th	23 February 2003	Stephen Fry	(6)
57th	15 February 2004	Stephen Fry	(6)
58th	12 February 2005	Stephen Fry	(6)
59th	19 February 2006	Stephen Fry	(6)
60th	11 February 2007	Jonathan Ross	(6)
61st	10 February 2008	Jonathan Ross	(6)
62nd	8 February 2009	Jonathan Ross	(6)
63rd	21 February 2010	Jonathan Ross	(6)
64th	13 February 2011	Jonathan Ross	(6)
65th	12 February 2012	Stephen Fry	(12)
66th	10 February 2013	Stephen Fry	(12)
67th	16 February 2014	Stephen Fry	(12)
68th	8 February 2015	Stephen Fry	(12)
69th	14 February 2016	Stephen Fry	(12)
70th	12 February 2017	Stephen Fry	(12)
71st	18 February 2018	Joanna Lumley	(2)
72nd	10 February 2019	Joanna Lumley	(2)
73rd	2 February 2020	Graham Norton	
74th	10–11 April 2021	Clara Amfo; Dermot O'Leary; Edith Bowman	
75th	13 March 2022	Rebel Wilson	
76th	19 February 2023	Richard E. Grant; Alison Hammond	
77th	18 February 2024	David Tennant	(2)
78th	16 February 2025	David Tennant	(2)
79th	22 February 2026	Alan Cumming	

== See also ==
- Academy Awards — the American equivalent of the BAFTAs
- British Academy of Film and Television Arts
- British Academy Television Awards — the highest honour in British television
- BRIT Awards — the highest honour in British music
- Laurence Olivier Awards — the highest honour in the professional London theatre and British theatre
