= Paul Rotha =

English film director (1907–1984)

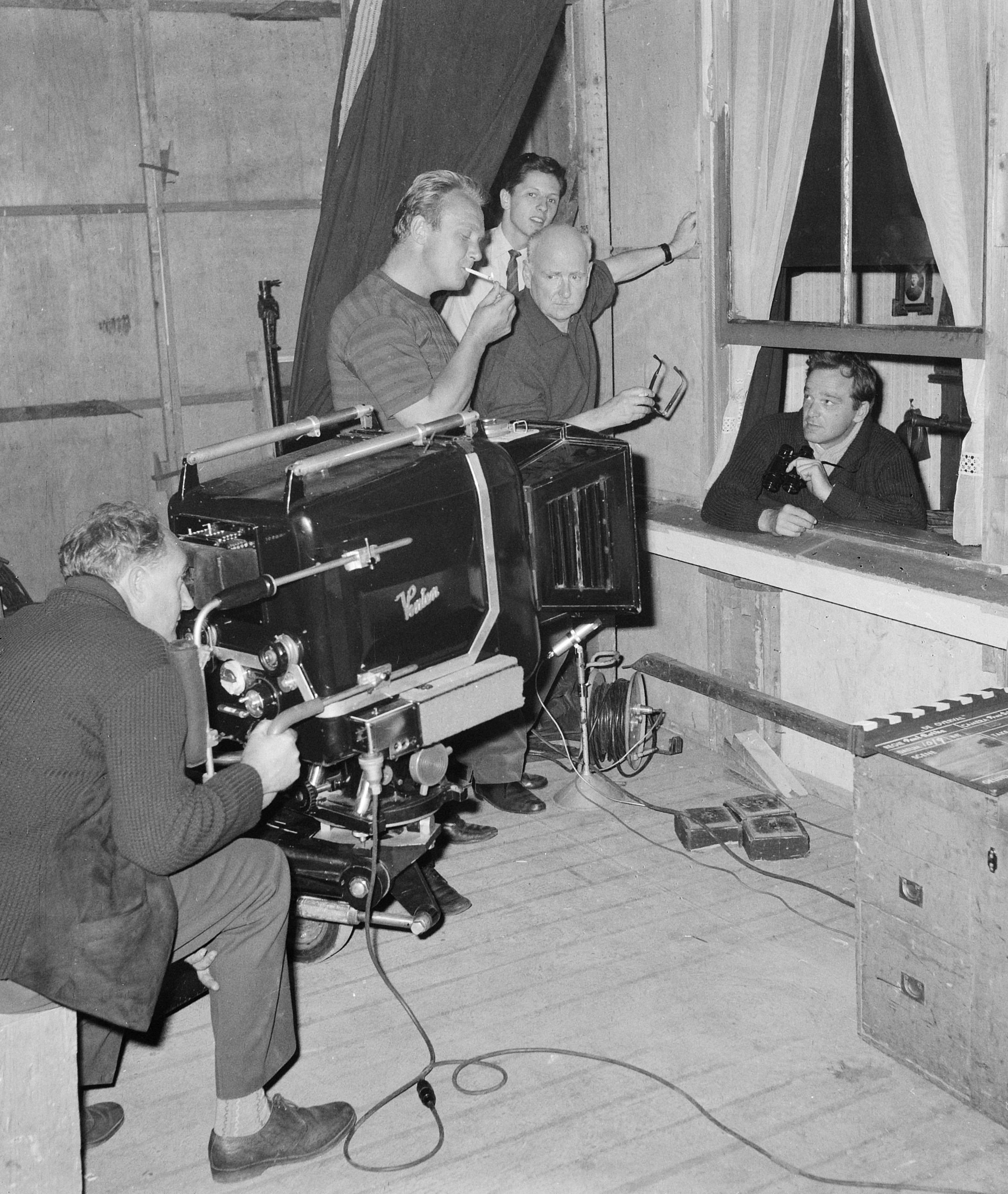
- Rotha (center, holding glasses) while filming The Silent Raid in the Netherlands in 1962
- Born: Paul Thompson; 3 June 1907; London, England
- Died: 7 March 1984 (aged 76); Wallingford, Oxfordshire, England
- Occupations: Filmmaker, film historian
- Years active: 1930s–1960s
- Spouse(s): Constance Smith (m. 1974; div. 1978)

Paul Rotha (3 June 1907 – 7 March 1984) was an English documentary film-maker, film historian and critic.

== Early life and education ==
He was born Paul Thompson in London, and educated at Highgate School and at the Slade School of Fine Art.

== Career ==
Rotha was a close collaborator of John Grierson, and Wolfgang Suschitzky was one of his cinematographers. He directed and produced dozens of documentaries including Contact (1933), Air Outpost (1937) The Face of Britain (1935), World of Plenty (1943), Land of Promise (1947), A City Speaks (1947) and many others. The World Is Rich (1947) and Cradle of Genius (1961), both of which were nominated for an Academy Award, and feature films including the BAFTA-nominated No Resting Place. Rotha was Head of BBC TV's Documentaries Department between May 1953 and May 1955.

Rotha shared with Otto Neurath an interest in the techniques of visual communication, and the two men worked together on several films, where Neurath's ISOTYPE pictorial statistics were animated as an important component of the films' arguments. He was initially a major opponent of sound in movies, although he later developed the technique of multi-voice commentary, in which the argument of the film is conveyed via discussion between several distinct voices, a distinctive form of documentary exposition. Films using this technique include New Worlds for Old (1938), World of Plenty (1943), The World is Rich (1947) and Land of Promise (1946).

Rotha wrote, produced and directed the 1958 crime drama Cat & Mouse, based on a novel by John Creasey and starring Lee Patterson and Ann Sears.

== Personal life ==
Rotha married Irish actress Constance Smith in 1974. Smith had twice (1961 and 1968) been charged with attacking Rotha and stabbing him.

Rotha died on 7 March 1984 in Wallingford, Oxfordshire.

== See also ==
- Bill Nichols
- Basil Wright

== Sources ==
- The Film Till Now: A Survey of the Cinema (London: Jonathan Cape, 1930)
- Documentary Film (London: Faber and Faber, 1935) The first major study on documentary film
- The Film Till Now: A Survey of World Cinema, with an additional section by Richard Griffith, revised and enlarged edition, (London: Vision, 1949)
- Portrait of a Flying Yorkshireman: Letters From Eric Knight in the United States to Paul Rotha in England, edited by Paul Rotha. Selected correspondence (London: Chapman and Hall, 1952)
- Rotha on the Film; a Selection of Writings About the Cinema (Fair Lawn, New Jersey: Essential Books, 1958)
- Documentary Film; the use of the film medium to interpret creatively and in social terms the life of the people as it exists in reality, by Paul Rotha in collaboration with Sinclair Road and Richard Griffith. 3d ed., rev. and enl.of Documentary Film (London: Faber and Faber, 1952; New York: Hastings House, 1963)
- Documentary Diary: An Informal History of the British Documentary Film 1928–1939 (New York: Hill and Wang, 1973)
- Robert J. Flaherty: A Biography, edited by Jay Ruby (Philadelphia: University of Pennsylvania Press, 1983)
- A Paul Rotha Reader, edited by Duncan Petrie and Robert Kruger (Exeter: University of Exeter Press, 1999)
