= 20th Academy Awards =

- Official pamphlet cover
- Date: March 20, 1948
- Site: Shrine Auditorium, Los Angeles, United States
- Hosted by: No host

Highlights
- Best Picture: Gentleman's Agreement
- Most awards: Gentleman's Agreement and Miracle on 34th Street (3)
- Most nominations: Gentleman's Agreement (8)

The 20th Academy Awards were held on March 20, 1948, to honor the films released in 1947. There was no host for this ceremony.

Rosalind Russell was highly favored—particularly in a poll from the Daily Variety—to win Best Actress for her performance in Mourning Becomes Electra, but Loretta Young won instead for The Farmer's Daughter.

James Baskett received an Academy Honorary Award for his portrayal of Uncle Remus in Song of the South, which made him the first African-American man, and the first actor in a Disney film, to win an Academy Award for acting.

Winning Best Supporting Actor at age 71, Edmund Gwenn became the oldest Oscar winner, taking the record from Charles Coburn, who was 66 at the time of his win in 1943 for The More the Merrier.

Darryl F. Zanuck, bitter over the failure of the 1944 biopic Wilson to win Best Picture, accepted the prize for Gentleman's Agreement by saying, "this award will make up for previous disappointments."

== Winners and nominees ==
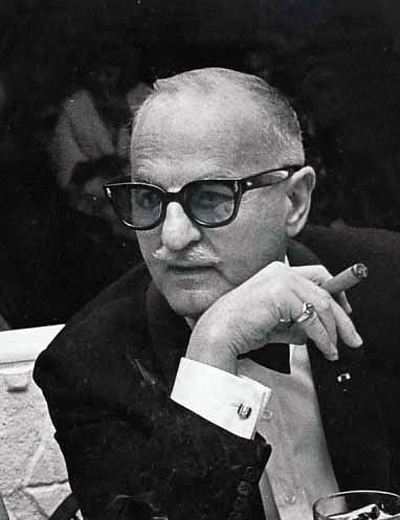
Darryl F. Zanuck; Best Picture winner

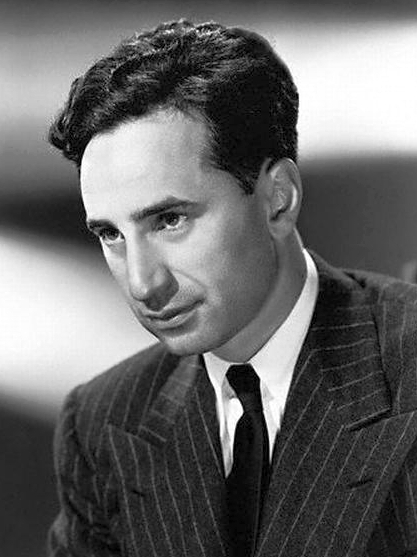
Elia Kazan; Best Director winner

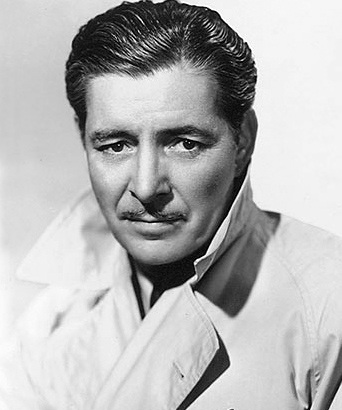
Ronald Colman; Best Actor winner

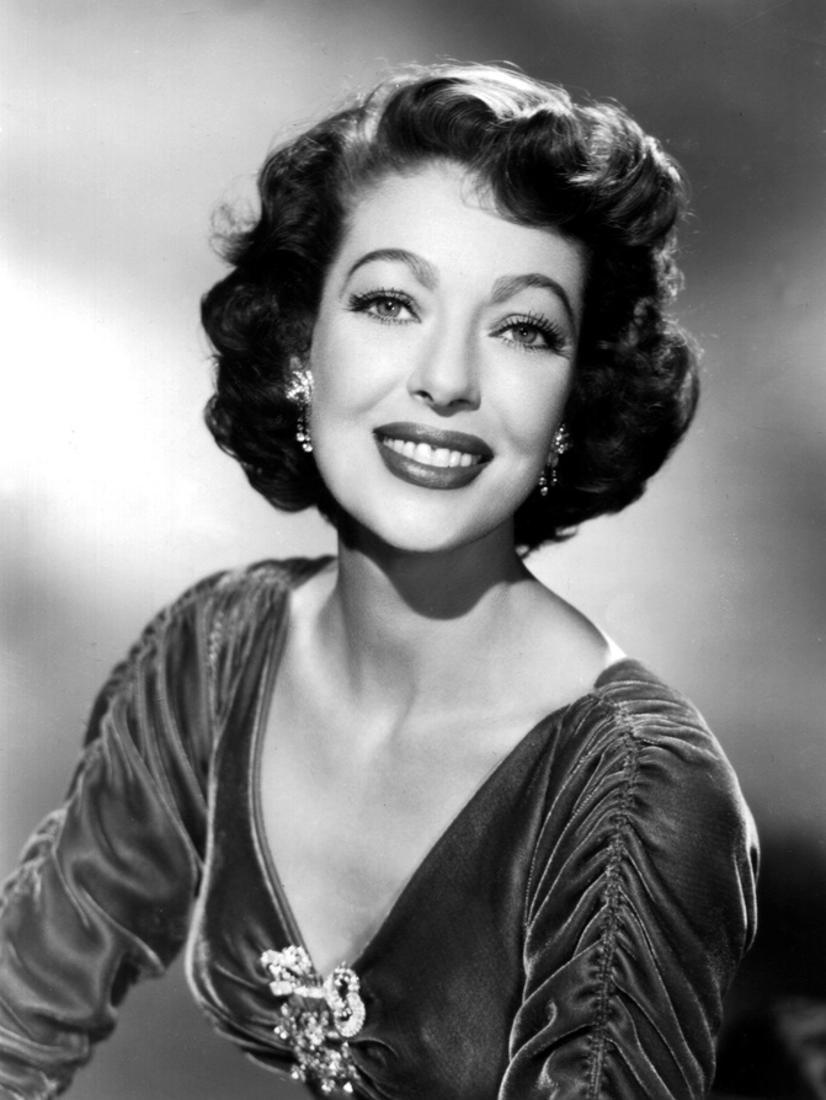
Loretta Young; Best Actress winner

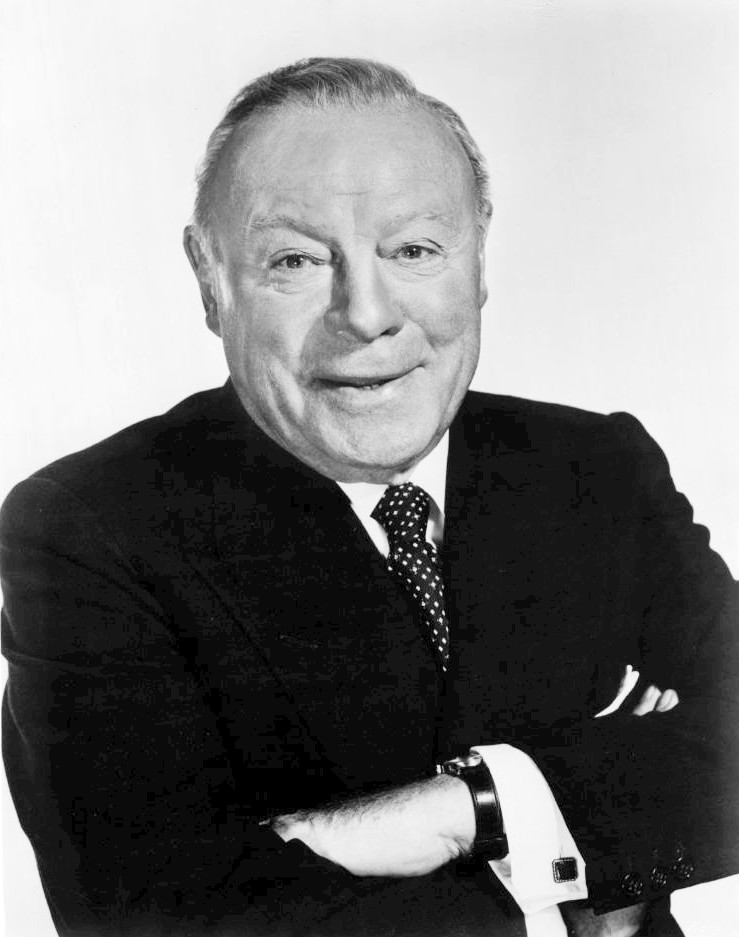
Edmund Gwenn, Best Supporting Actor winner

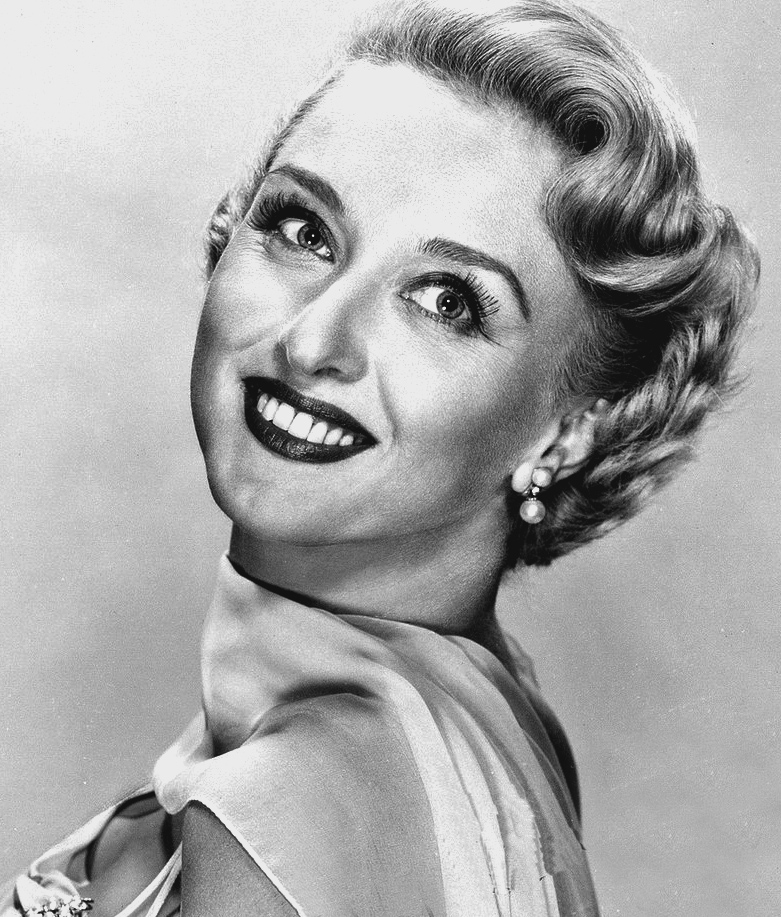
Celeste Holm; Best Supporting Actress winner

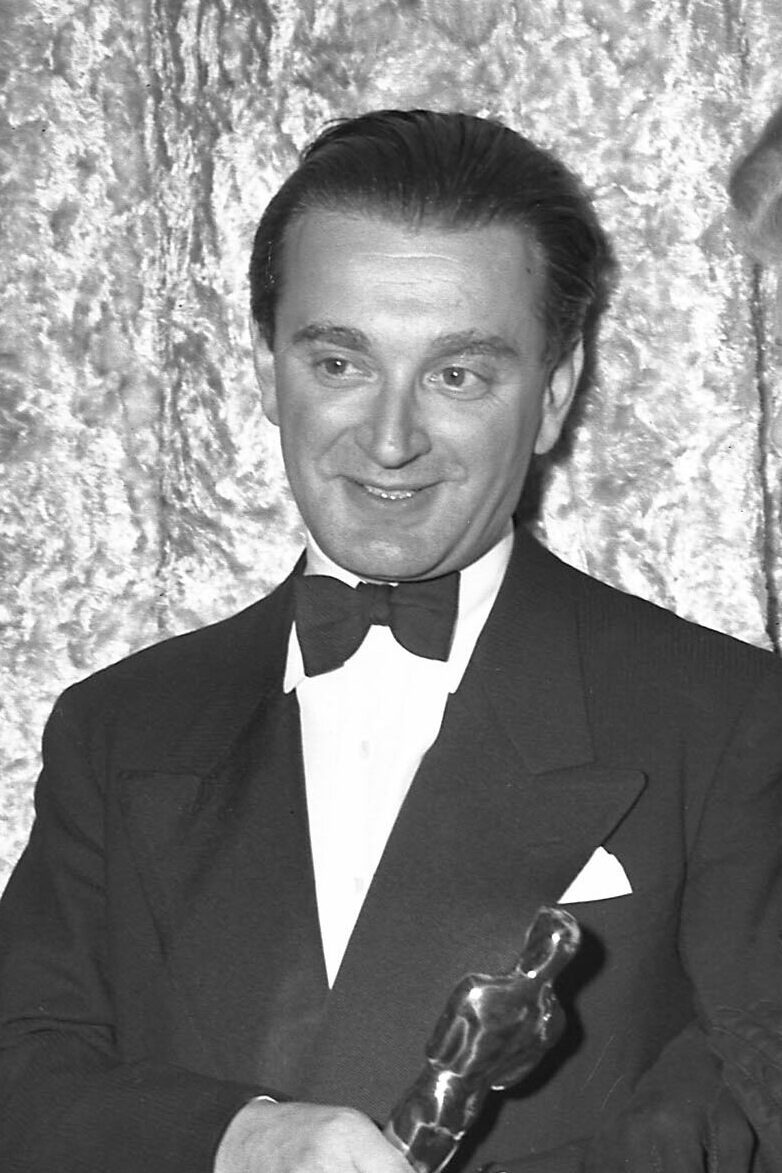
Miklos Rozsa, Best Music (Music Score of a Dramatic or Comedy Picture) winner

=== Awards ===
Nominees were announced on February 13, 1948. Winners are listed first and highlighted in boldface.

**Best Motion Picture**: **Gentleman's Agreement – Darryl F. Zanuck for 20th Century Fox**; The Bishop's Wife – Samuel Goldwyn for RKO Radio Pictures; Crossfire – Adrian Scott for RKO Radio Pictures; Great Expectations – Ronald Neame for Universal Studios and General Film Distributors, Ltd.; Miracle on 34th Street – William Perlberg for 20th Century Fox	**Best Directing**: **Elia Kazan – Gentleman's Agreement**; Henry Koster – The Bishop's Wife; Edward Dmytryk – Crossfire; George Cukor – A Double Life; David Lean – Great Expectations
**Best Actor**: **Ronald Colman – A Double Life as Anthony John**; John Garfield – Body and Soul as Charlie Davis; Gregory Peck – Gentleman's Agreement as Philip Schuyler Green; William Powell – Life with Father as Clarence Day Sr.; Michael Redgrave – Mourning Becomes Electra as Orin Mannon	**Best Actress**: **Loretta Young – The Farmer's Daughter as Katie Holstrom**; Joan Crawford – Possessed as Louise Howell; Susan Hayward – Smash-Up, the Story of a Woman as Angie Evans; Dorothy McGuire – Gentleman's Agreement as Kathy Lacey; Rosalind Russell – Mourning Becomes Electra as Lavinia Mannon
**Best Actor in a Supporting Role**: **Edmund Gwenn – Miracle on 34th Street as Kris Kringle**; Charles Bickford – The Farmer's Daughter as Joseph Clancy; Thomas Gomez – Ride the Pink Horse as Pancho; Robert Ryan – Crossfire as Montgomery; Richard Widmark – Kiss of Death as Tommy Udo	**Best Actress in a Supporting Role**: **Celeste Holm – Gentleman's Agreement as Anne Dettrey**; Ethel Barrymore – The Paradine Case as Lady Sophie Horfield; Gloria Grahame – Crossfire as Ginny Tremaine; Marjorie Main – The Egg and I as Ma Kettle; Anne Revere – Gentleman's Agreement as Mrs Green
**Best Writing (Motion Picture Story)**: **Miracle on 34th Street – Valentine Davies**; A Cage of Nightingales – Georges Chaperot and René Wheeler; It Happened on 5th Avenue – Herbert Clyde Lewis and Frederick Stephani; Kiss of Death – Eleazar Lipsky; Smash-Up, the Story of a Woman – Dorothy Parker and Frank Cavett	**Best Writing (Original Screenplay)**: **The Bachelor and the Bobby-Soxer – Sidney Sheldon**; Body and Soul – Abraham Polonsky; A Double Life – Ruth Gordon and Garson Kanin; Monsieur Verdoux – Charlie Chaplin; Shoeshine – Sergio Amidei, Adolfo Franci, Cesare Giulio Viola and Cesare Zavattini
**Best Writing (Screenplay)**: **Miracle on 34th Street – George Seaton from a story by Valentine Davies**; Boomerang! – Richard Murphy from a Reader's Digest article by Anthony Abbot; Crossfire – John Paxton from The Brick Foxhole by Richard Brooks; Gentleman's Agreement – Moss Hart from Gentleman's Agreement by Laura Z. Hobson; Great Expectations – David Lean, Ronald Neame and Anthony Havelock-Allan from Great Expectations by Charles Dickens	**Best Documentary (Feature)**: **Design for Death – Sid Rogell, Theron Warth, and Richard Fleischer**; Journey into Medicine – United States Department of State Office of Information and Educational Exchange; The World Is Rich – Paul Rotha
**Best Documentary (Short Subject)**: **First Steps – United Nations Division of Films and Visual Information**; Passport to Nowhere – Frederic Ullman, Jr.; School in the Mailbox – Australian News & Information Bureau	**Best Short Subject (One-Reel)**: **Goodbye, Miss Turlock – Herbert Moulton**; Brooklyn, U.S.A. – Thomas Mead; Moon Rockets – Jerry Fairbanks; Now You See It – Pete Smith; So You Want to Be in Pictures – Gordon Hollingshead
**Best Short Subject (Two-Reel)**: **Climbing the Matterhorn – Irving Allen**; Champagne for Two – Harry Grey; Fight of the Wild Stallions – Thomas Mead; Give Us the Earth – Herbert Morgan; A Voice Is Born: The Story of Miklos Gafni – Ben Blake	**Best Short Subject (Cartoon)**: **Tweetie Pie – Edward Selzer**; Chip an' Dale – Walt Disney; Dr. Jekyll and Mr. Mouse – Fred Quimby; Pluto's Blue Note – Walt Disney; Tubby the Tuba – George Pal
**Best Music (Music Score of a Dramatic or Comedy Picture)**: **A Double Life – Miklós Rózsa**; The Bishop's Wife – Hugo Friedhofer; Captain from Castile – Alfred Newman; Forever Amber – David Raksin; Life with Father – Max Steiner	**Best Music (Scoring of a Musical Picture)**: **Mother Wore Tights – Alfred Newman**; Fiesta – Johnny Green; My Wild Irish Rose – Ray Heindorf and Max Steiner; Road to Rio – Robert Emmett Dolan; Song of the South – Daniele Amfitheatrof, Paul J. Smith and Charles Wolcott
**Best Music (Song)**: **"Zip-a-Dee-Doo-Dah" from Song of the South – Music by Allie Wrubel; Lyrics by Ray Gilbert**; "A Gal in Calico" from The Time, the Place and the Girl – Music by Arthur Schwartz; Lyrics by Leo Robin; "I Wish I Didn't Love You So" from The Perils of Pauline – Music and Lyrics by Frank Loesser; "Pass That Peace Pipe" from Good News – Music and Lyrics by Ralph Blane, Hugh Martin and Roger Edens; "You Do" from Mother Wore Tights – Music by Josef Myrow; Lyrics by Mack Gordon	**Best Sound Recording**: **The Bishop's Wife – Gordon E. Sawyer**; Green Dolphin Street – Douglas Shearer; T-Men – Jack Whitney
**Best Art Direction (Black-and-White)**: **Great Expectations – Art Direction: John Bryan; Set Decoration: Wilfred Shingleton**; The Foxes of Harrow – Art Direction: Lyle R. Wheeler and Maurice Ransford; Set Decoration: Thomas Little and Paul S. Fox	**Best Art Direction (Color)**: **Black Narcissus – Art Direction and Set Decoration: Alfred Junge**; Life with Father – Art Direction: Robert M. Haas; Set Decoration: George James Hopkins
**Best Cinematography (Black-and-White)**: **Great Expectations – Guy Green**; The Ghost and Mrs. Muir – Charles Lang; Green Dolphin Street – George J. Folsey	**Best Cinematography (Color)**: **Black Narcissus – Jack Cardiff**; Life with Father – Peverell Marley and William V. Skall; Mother Wore Tights – Harry Jackson
**Best Film Editing**: **Body and Soul – Francis D. Lyon and Robert Parrish**; The Bishop's Wife – Monica Collingwood; Gentleman's Agreement – Harmon Jones; Green Dolphin Street – George White; Odd Man Out – Fergus McDonell	**Best Special Effects**: **Green Dolphin Street – Special Visual Effects: A. Arnold Gillespie and Warren Newcombe; Special Audible Effects: Douglas Shearer and Michael Steinore**; Unconquered – Special Visual Effects: Farciot Edouart, Devereux Jennings, Gordon Jennings, Wallace Kelley and Paul Lerpae; Special Audible Effects: George Dutton

=== Special awards ===
- To James Baskett for his able and heart-warming characterization of Uncle Remus, friend and storyteller to the children of the world in Walt Disney's Song of the South.
- To Bill and Coo, in which artistry and patience blended in a novel and entertaining use of the medium of motion pictures.
- To Shoeshine (Italy)—The high quality of this motion picture, brought to eloquent life in a country scarred by war, is proof to the world that the creative spirit can triumph over adversity.
- To Colonel William N. Selig, Albert E. Smith, Thomas Armat, and George K. Spoor, (one of) the small group of pioneers whose belief in a new medium and whose contributions to its development blazed the trail along which the motion picture has progressed, in their lifetime, from obscurity to worldwide acclaim.

== Presenters and performers ==
=== Presenters ===
List of presenters, in order of appearance
Name	Role
George Murphy	presented the awards for Motion Picture Story and Original Screenplay
Robert Montgomery	presented the Scientific and Technical Awards
Shirley Temple	presented the Documentary and Short Subject Awards
Larry Parks	presented the awards for Best Special Effects, Best Musical Score and Best Sound Recording
Donald Crisp	presented the awards for Best Supporting Actress and Best Director
Olivia de Havilland	presented the award for Best Actor
Dinah Shore	presented the award for Best Original Song
Dick Powell	presented the award for Best Art Direction
Jean Simmons	accepted the Best Art Direction award on behalf of J. Arthur Rank
Jean Hersholt	presented the Honorary Awards
Ingrid Bergman	presented the Honorary Award to James Baskett
Agnes Moorehead	presented the awards for Best Cinematography
Anne Baxter	presented the awards for Best Cinematography, Best Supporting Actor, Best Screenplay and Best Film Editing
Fredric March	presented the awards for Best Actress and Best Picture

=== Performers ===
List of musical performances, in order of appearance
Artist	Song
Gordon MacRae	"A Girl in Calico"
Dennis Day	"I Wish I Didn't Love You So"
Dinah Shore	"Pass That Peace Pipe"
Frances Langford	"You Do"
Johnny Mercer and the Pied Pipers	"Zip-a-Dee-Doo-Dah"

== Multiple nominations and awards ==
Films with multiple nominations
Nominations	Film
8	Gentleman's Agreement
5	The Bishop's Wife
5	Crossfire
5	Great Expectations
4	A Double Life
4	Green Dolphin Street
4	Life with Father
4	Miracle on 34th Street
3	Body and Soul
3	Mother Wore Tights
2	Black Narcissus
2	The Farmer's Daughter
2	Kiss of Death
2	Mourning Becomes Electra
2	Smash-Up, the Story of a Woman
2	Song of the South (Note: Not including the Special Award for Song of the South.)

Films with multiple awards
Awards	Film
3	Gentleman's Agreement
3	Miracle on 34th Street
2	Black Narcissus
2	A Double Life
2	Great Expectations

== See also ==
- 5th Golden Globe Awards
- 1947 in film
- 1st British Academy Film Awards
- 2nd Tony Awards
