= Mourning Becomes Electra (film) =

1947 film

- Directed by: Dudley Nichols
- Written by: Dudley Nichols
- Based on: Mourning Becomes Electra; 1931 play by Eugene O'Neill
- Produced by: Dudley Nichols
- Starring: Rosalind Russell; Michael Redgrave; Raymond Massey; Katina Paxinou; Leo Genn; Kirk Douglas
- Cinematography: George Barnes
- Edited by: Roland Gross; Chandler House
- Music by: Richard Hageman
- Production company: RKO Radio Pictures
- Distributed by: RKO Radio Pictures
- Release date: November 19, 1947
- Running time: 173 minutes (original roadshow release version); 159 minutes (restored version); 121 minutes (general release version); 105 minutes (heavily cut TV version)
- Country: United States
- Language: English
- Budget: $2,342,000
- Box office: $435,000

Mourning Becomes Electra is a 1947 American drama film by Dudley Nichols adapted from the 1931 Eugene O'Neill play Mourning Becomes Electra, based in turn on the Oresteia. The film stars Rosalind Russell, Michael Redgrave, Raymond Massey, Katina Paxinou, Leo Genn and Kirk Douglas.

Rosalind Russell was nominated for the Best Actress in a Leading Role and Michael Redgrave was nominated for the Best Actor in a Leading Role. Originally released by RKO Radio Pictures at nearly three hours running time, it was eventually cut to 105 minutes after it performed poorly at the box-office and won no Oscars. Though the complete version appears to be lost, the British cut, running 159 minutes, survives and is available on DVD and has been shown on Turner Classic Movies.

A major Oscar upset occurred in connection with the film. Many who had seen it had taken it for granted that Rosalind Russell would win the Best Actress award for her performance as Lavinia, to the point that Russell actually began to rise from her seat just before the winner's name was called. However, Loretta Young won for her role in The Farmer's Daughter.

The film recorded a loss of $2,310,000, making it one of RKO's biggest financial failures.

== Plot ==
The Civil War is ending. Seth, an old family servant, awaits the return of various members of the wealthy New England Mannon family—especially the patriarch, Ezra, a general in the Union army. Seth shows neighbors around the house, and the women recall a 20-year-old scandal: Ezra's brother, David Mannon, had to marry the French nurse girl who worked for their father, Abe. Abe banished the couple, destroyed the family home and built a new one “out of pure hate.”

In New York City, Ezra's daughter Lavinia follows her mother, Christine, to the residence of sea captain Adam Brant and is shocked to see them kiss. She remembers sharing a passionate kiss with Brant.

Christine returns home. Lavinia, preoccupied with the memory, refuses to see her. The next day, Peter Niles proposes to Lavinia. She refuses, saying that her father needs her. Niles' sister, Hazel, seeks news of Lavinia's brother Orin.

Seth tells Lavinia that Adam is actually David's son, encouraging her to challenge the man. When she does, Adam pours out the true story of how their grandfather coveted the girl and revenged himself on David. But Adam's greatest hate is for Ezra, who did not reply to his mother’s plea for a loan when she was starving to death. Adam swore revenge.

Lavinia confronts her mother, who declares that she has hated Ezra since their wedding night. The “disgust” she felt poisoned her relationship with Lavinia from the day she was born. Lavinia, who worships her father, blames Christine. Christine knows who Adam is and loves him. She knows Lavinia loves Adam. But Lavinia forces her to give him up by threatening to tell Ezra the truth. She paints an ugly picture of the future if they run away—and the difference in their ages grows more plain.

Ezra has a weak heart, and Christine tells Adam what poison to purchase in Boston. As he walks away, she whispers to herself that he will never be able to leave her now.

Ezra returns home. His harrowing experiences during the war have changed him. He has loved Christine always and begs her to help “smash the wall” between them. Christine tells him she loves him, and Lavinia interrupts their kiss. But in their bedroom, the mutual hate pours out of both of them, and Ezra has a heart attack. Christine gives him medicine. He dies in Lavinia's arms, pointing at his wife and saying “Not medicine”. When Christine faints, Lavinia takes the box of pills.

Orin comes home, his head wound bandaged. He and his mother talk about their special relationship. (He only courted Hazel to make her jealous.) But Christine's obsession with putting Lavinia in the wrong backfires, and Orin believes Lavinia when he sees his mother's reaction to the pillbox.

On board Adam's ship, Orin and Lavinia witness Christine and Adam planning to flee. Orin shoots Adam in the back. “How could you love that vile old woman so?” Lavinia asks the corpse. They make it look like robbery and boast of it to Christine, who commits suicide with Ezra's pistol. Orin is shattered.

Some time later, Orin and Lavinia return home from the islands. Lavinia is the image of her mother, dressed in white and wearing the same elaborate coiffure. Peter is delighted with the change. Orin, bearded as his father was, has been driven mad by guilt. He gives Hazel a document to open if he dies or if Lavinia tries to marry Peter. Panic-stricken, Lavinia promises anything if he takes it back. He does. Peter returns, and Orin takes the opportunity to kill himself.

Lavinia, dressed in mourning, waits for Peter. Hazel accuses her of driving Orin to suicide. She begs her to let Peter read what was in the envelope. Lavinia burns it. Peter arrives. He has quarreled with his family but still wants her. In Lavinia's frenzied embrace she calls him “Adam”. She sends him away to reconcile with his family, confessing falsely to an affair with a native islander. To the sound of Seth closing the shutters on all windows, she withdraws into the house, there to be punished by the “Mannon dead.”

== Cast ==
- Rosalind Russell as Lavinia Mannon
- Michael Redgrave as Orin Mannon
- Raymond Massey as Ezra Mannon
- Katina Paxinou as Christine Mannon
- Leo Genn as Adam Brant
- Kirk Douglas as Peter Niles
- Nancy Coleman as Hazel Niles
- Henry Hull as Seth Beckwith
- Sara Allgood as Landlady
- Thurston Hall as Dr. Blake
- Walter Baldwin as Amos Ames
- Elisabeth Risdon as Mrs. Hills
- Erskine Sanford as Josiah Borden
- Clem Bevans as Ira Mackel
- Jimmy Conlin as Abner Small
- Lee Baker as Reverend Hills
- Tito Vuolo as Joe Silva
- Emma Dunn as Mrs. Borden
- Nora Cecil as Louisa Ames
- Marie Blake as Minnie Ames
- Jean Clarenden as Eben Nobel

== Reception ==
Contemporary reviews were critical. Writing for The New York Times, Bosley Crowther criticized the film as "tedious" and overlong, attributing its weakness to acting that was "more pretentious than inspired" and to the inadequacy of the screen as a medium for so "lengthily dialogic" a cycle of plays. In Time, critic James Agee wrote, "And on the screen, the dreadful, faintly ludicrous enginery of Eugene O'Neill's tragedy of incest lurches, and begins. The Mannons were the first family of a small New England seaport of 1865. Through the body of their Freudian existence, O'Neill has rammed the misfitting dramatic skeleton of the Greek trilogy, Oresteia ... By attempting to dramatize the Oedipus complex on a framework of Greek drama, O'Neill produced a travesty of Freudian thought and something like a parody of Greek tragedy."

== Awards and nominations ==
Award	Category	Nominee(s)	Result	Ref.
Academy Awards	Best Actor	Michael Redgrave	Nominated	
Academy Awards	Best Actress	Rosalind Russell	Nominated	
Golden Globe Awards	Best Actress in a Leading Role	Rosalind Russell	Won	
National Board of Review Awards	Best Actor	Michael Redgrave	Won	
