= Kiss of Death (1995 film) =

1995 film by Barbet Schroeder

- Promotional film poster
- Directed by: Barbet Schroeder
- Screenplay by: Richard Price
- Story by: Eleazar Lipsky
- Based on: Kiss of Death; 1947 film by Ben Hecht; Charles Lederer
- Produced by: Susan Hoffman; Barbet Schroeder
- Starring: David Caruso; Kathryn Erbe; Helen Hunt; Samuel L. Jackson; Michael Rapaport; Ving Rhames; Stanley Tucci; Nicolas Cage
- Cinematography: Luciano Tovoli
- Edited by: Lee Percy
- Music by: Trevor Jones
- Distributed by: 20th Century Fox
- Release date: April 21, 1995 (US)
- Running time: 101 minutes
- Country: United States
- Language: English
- Budget: $40 million
- Box office: $14.9 million (US)

Kiss of Death is a 1995 American crime thriller film directed and produced by Barbet Schroeder, and starring David Caruso, Samuel L. Jackson, Nicolas Cage, Helen Hunt, Ving Rhames and Stanley Tucci.

The film is a remake of the 1947 film noir classic of the same name that starred Victor Mature, Brian Donlevy, and Richard Widmark. It was screened out of competition at the 1995 Cannes Film Festival. Like the original Kiss of Death, the film was released by 20th Century Fox.

== Plot ==
Jimmy Kilmartin is a reformed ex-convict living in Astoria, with his wife Bev and their daughter. Both Jimmy and Bev are recovering alcoholics. One day, Bev leaves Jimmy alone to attend an Alcoholics Anonymous meeting. During her absence, Jimmy's cousin Ronnie, who is in trouble, urgently seeks his help in moving stolen cars. Knowing the risks involved, Jimmy initially refuses but eventually agrees out of concern for Ronnie's safety. Ronnie reveals that a dangerous asthmatic psychopath named Little Junior Brown will kill him if the cars aren't moved.

In a rush to catch up on their schedule, Ronnie insists on moving the stolen cars together in a caravan, attracting the attention of the police. When they reach the Brooklyn Navy Yard to unload the cars, the police show up. During the chaos of the arrest, Jimmy's passenger shoots at the police, injuring Detective Calvin Hart and causing a bullet to graze Jimmy's hand and Detective Hart's face.

Jack Gold, the lawyer for the Brown crime family, promises Jimmy that his wife Bev will be taken care of if he takes the blame for the incident without revealing his co-conspirators. However, Ronnie shortchanges Bev's allowance, and she is coerced into working for Ronnie at his chop shop near Shea Stadium. On her first day, Bev witnesses Ronnie beating a man who tried to sell him a stolen car. Feeling overwhelmed, she succumbs to temptation and drinks alcohol. Ronnie takes her to Baby Cakes, a strip club owned by the Browns, where he continues to ply her with alcohol and make advances towards her. Big Junior and Little Junior Brown intervene, and despite their anger towards Ronnie, they order him to take Bev home. Instead, Ronnie brings her to his house, causing Bev to panic and flee in Ronnie's car. Tragically, she crashes head-on into a semi-truck and dies instantly.

Given supervised release for Bev's funeral, Jimmy listens to Ronnie's feeble explanation for Bev's death. Bev's sister Rosie informs Jimmy that Bev never returned home the night before her death. Suspecting Ronnie's involvement, Jimmy agrees to become a state witness and reveals the names of all those involved in the Navy Yard incident, except Ronnie. When the police arrest everyone except Ronnie, the Browns believe Ronnie is the snitch. In retaliation, Little Junior Brown beats Ronnie to death in his office.

Several years pass, and the district attorney approaches Jimmy again, urging him to inform on the Browns. Still serving his sentence in Sing Sing, Jimmy negotiates a pardon and a job he would enjoy. He marries Rosie but keeps his duties as an informant hidden from her. Detective Hart informs Jimmy that their target is actually a drug dealer named Omar, who receives weapons and cars from Little Junior Brown. Jimmy agrees to wear a wire and resumes working for the Browns, starting with car thefts.

During his time with the crew, Jimmy encounters Little Junior at Baby Cakes, where he offers condolences for Bev's death. Junior takes Jimmy to a meeting with Omar, but Jimmy's deception becomes increasingly difficult to maintain, straining his relationship with Rosie. Eventually, Junior takes Jimmy to another meeting with Omar, where Jimmy witnesses Junior killing Omar. Later, Omar's crew kidnaps Jimmy and takes him to a meeting, revealing that Omar was an undercover DEA agent.

Using the tape of Omar's killing as evidence, the district attorney and the DEA arrest Little Junior. However, after Junior is released on bail, he kidnaps Jimmy's daughter to send him a message. Jimmy eventually locates his daughter in the woods, her forehead marked with the letters B.A.D. (Balls, Attitude, Direction) in blood, symbolizing Junior's ruthless nature. Realizing his family is no longer safe, Jimmy returns to the city and confronts Junior at Baby Cakes, holding him at gunpoint. A fight ensues, leading to Junior's arrest by Detective Hart, who discovers Jimmy was wearing a wire. Jimmy uses a tape containing corrupt threats from the district attorney as leverage, allowing him to escape the situation.

In the final scene, Jimmy gets into a stolen Explorer gifted to him by Junior and leaves the city with Rosie and their daughter, seeking a new life away from danger.

== Cast ==
- David Caruso as Jimmy Kilmartin
- Samuel L. Jackson as Detective Calvin Hart
- Nicolas Cage as Junior "Little Junior" Brown
- Helen Hunt as Beverly "Bev" Kilmartin
- Ving Rhames as FBI Agent Omar
- Stanley Tucci as District Attorney Frank Zioli
- Kathryn Erbe as Rosie D'Amico-Kilmartin
- Michael Rapaport as Ronnie Gannon
- Philip Baker Hall as Junior "Big Junior" Brown
- Anthony Heald as Attorney Jack Gold
- Lindsay J. Wrinn as Corinna Kilmartin As A Toddler
- Megan L. Wrinn as Corinna Kilmartin As A Toddler
- Katie Sagona as Corinna Kilmartin, 4 Years Old
- Angel David as J.J.
- John Costelloe as Detective Cleary
- Anne Meara as Bev's Mother
- Kevin Corrigan as Kid Selling Stolen Infinity
- Hope Davis as Junior's Girlfriend
- Jason Andrews as Johnny "Johnny A" Amato
- Sean G. Wallace as Bobby "Bobby B" Bannion
- Frank DiLeo as Big Junior's Friend
- Tony Cucci as Little Junior's Crew #1
- Allen K. Berstein as Little Junior's Crew #2
- Jose De Soto as J.J.'s Crew
- Debra J. Pereira as Sioux Dancer
- Bernadette Penotti as Molested Dancer
- Edward McDonald as US Attorney
- Mark Hammer as Judge
- Joe Pentangelo as Riker's Prison Guard
- Joe Lisi as FBI Agent At Bungalow
- Shiek Mahmud-Bey as FBI Agent
- John C. Vennema as Angry FBI Agent
- Ed Trucco as Calvin's Partner
- Paul Calderon as Undercover FBI Agent (uncredited)
- Jay O. Sanders as Senior FBI Agent (uncredited)

== Reception ==
Kenneth Turan of the Los Angeles Times called Cage "one of the few American actors who gets more interesting from film to film", adding that he "comes close to kidnapping the picture as Little Junior, a pumped-up but asthmatic thug who, like King Kong, is a gorilla with a wistful air about him." Writing in the Chicago Sun-Times, Roger Ebert found the film uncompelling, awarding it only 2 out of 4 stars. Though he also considered the character of Little Junior "overwritten", Ebert did praise Nicolas Cage's performance, calling Cage a "real movie actor" who "plays the role with style and bravado." Hal Hinson of The Washington Post wrote that Cage "dominates the camera, stealing scenes by the sheer intensity of his inimitable strangeness" and makes the film "worth seeing". Todd McCarthy of Variety described it as "a very loose remake" and "crackling thriller" that is most notable for Cage's performance. Janet Maslin of The New York Times wrote, "In Kiss of Death [Caruso] becomes a movie star with a vengeance, the kind of movie star he was meant to be."

The film holds a 69% approval rating on Rotten Tomatoes based on 42 reviews. The site's consensus reads: "An outstanding ensemble cast propels Kiss of Death, a noir-ish crime thriller that's slick and big on atmosphere, even if its script may only provide sporadic bursts of tension."

Audiences polled by CinemaScore gave the film an average grade of "B−" on an A+ to F scale.

David Caruso was nominated for a Razzie Award for Worst New Star for his work in both this movie and Jade, but lost to Elizabeth Berkley for Showgirls.
