= Michael Z. Hobson =

American publisher (1936–2020)

Michael Zametkin Hobson (December 8, 1936 – November 12, 2020) was an American publisher who was an executive vice president for Marvel Comics.

== Life and career ==
Hobson was born on December 8, 1936, and adopted on February 13, 1937, by a single woman, Laura Z. Hobson, future author of Gentleman's Agreement (1947) and other novels. A graduate of Phillips Exeter Academy and Harvard College, Michael Hobson began his career at Little, Brown and Company in Boston, Massachusetts. After stints at Publishers Weekly and as a literary agent at William Morris, Hobson joined the Scholastic Publishing Company. He worked in various positions at Scholastic, ultimately as publisher of its paperback book clubs.

Hobson then joined Marvel Comics as executive vice president. He was responsible for editorial, marketing, distribution and production of Marvel's comics, magazines and graphic novels. Hobson went on to run Marvel's international business as managing director of Marvel Europe, including its companies in the United Kingdom and Italy, as well as its publishing and licensing operations throughout the rest of Europe. Hobson then returned to the U.S., where he became president of Parachute Publishing, a packager of fiction and non-fiction book series for teens and preteens. In 2009, Hobson joined Cracked Entertainment, Inc., as senior adviser to assist in the redesign of the then 45-year-old Cracked magazine. Hobson married Ann Gould in 1965. The couple had two children.

Hobson died at 83 years old from heart failure.
