= This Happy Breed (film) =

- DVD release cover
- Directed by: David Lean
- Written by: David Lean; Anthony Havelock-Allan; Ronald Neame
- Based on: This Happy Breed by Noël Coward
- Produced by: Noël Coward
- Starring: Robert Newton; Celia Johnson; Stanley Holloway; John Mills
- Cinematography: Ronald Neame
- Edited by: Jack Harris
- Music by: Muir Mathieson; Clifton Parker
- Distributed by: Eagle-Lion Distributors Limited
- Release date: 1 June 1944
- Running time: 115 minutes
- Country: United Kingdom
- Language: English
- Budget: $900,000

This Happy Breed is a 1944 British Technicolor drama film directed by David Lean and starring Robert Newton, Celia Johnson, Stanley Holloway and John Mills. The screenplay by Lean (who also made his screenwriting debut), Anthony Havelock-Allan and Ronald Neame is based on the 1939 play This Happy Breed, by Noël Coward.

The film tells the story of an inter-war suburban London family, set against the backdrop of news events, moving from the post-WWI era of the 1920s to the growing threat of another world war, with the passing of the torch from one generation to the next. Domestic triumphs and tragedies play against such transformative changes as the coming of household radio and talking pictures. The film was not released in the United States until April 1947.

== Plot ==
Laurence Olivier provides introductory narration over a moving aerial shot of 1919 London: "After four long years of war, the men are coming home. Hundreds and hundreds of houses are becoming homes once more". The film focuses on the Gibbons family – Frank, his wife Ethel, their three children Reg, Vi and Queenie, his widowed sister Sylvia and Ethel's mother – after they settle in a rented house in South London. Frank is delighted that his next-door neighbour is Bob Mitchell, a friend from his army days. Frank finds employment with a travel agency, arranging tours of Western Front battlefields. As the children grow up and the country adapts to peacetime, the family attend the British Empire Exhibition held at Wembley in 1924 and acquire their first crystal radio around Christmas 1925.

During the General Strike of 1926 (in which Frank and Bob volunteer as driver and conductor of a bus), Reg is injured in a brawl. Vi blames Sam, her socialist boyfriend, who had brought her brother to the area, but eventually her anger dissipates and she marries him. In 1928, Queenie wins a Charleston dance contest. In 1929 Sam and Vi attend one of the new talking pictures, The Broadway Melody, at the cinema. News of the electoral rise of the German Nazi Party begins to appear in newspapers. (Note: The headline in the film refers to the September 1930 German federal election at which the Nazis achieved a major breakthrough, rising from a dozen seats to become the second-largest party in the Reichstag. Adolf Hitler, its leader, finally came to power in January 1933.) Later, Reg marries his girlfriend Phyl. Bob's son, Billy, who has joined the Royal Navy, has been going out with Queenie, and proposes to her. She turns him down, and Billy asks her if there's anyone else, and if there is, why didn't she tell him. He then guesses that the other man is married.

One night, on coming home from a drunken 1931 regimental reunion, Bob expresses his faith in the League of Nations, scoffing at Frank's concerns about the recent Japanese invasion of Manchuria. They try to keep quiet but inadvertently wake Ethel, who packs Bob off home and Frank to bed, when she notices a letter left by Queenie, who has run off with the married man. Ethel vows never to forgive her.

As time passes, the family mourn the death of Reg and Phyl in a car crash, Ethel's mother dies of pneumonia after influenza, and Aunt Sylvia discovers spiritualism. Some time afterwards, in Hyde Park, Frank and Ethel briefly witness a member of the British Union of Fascists trying to stir up anti-Semitic sentiment among listeners. (Note: The speaker, who is wearing a black uniform as these had not yet been banned by the Public Order Act 1936, refers to the recent disorder at the 1934 Olympia Rally.) Stanley Baldwin wins the 1935 United Kingdom general election. In January 1936, King George V dies; Frank and Ethel join the crowds filing past his coffin. King Edward VIII abdicates 11 months later.

In 1938, Neville Chamberlain returns from Munich, celebrating "peace in our time” with a cheering crowd outside 10 Downing Street, to Frank's disgust. On leave from the navy, Billy visits the family with news of Queenie. Abandoned by her lover, she and another woman had opened a tearoom in France to make ends meet. She deeply regretted leaving home. Billy further reveals he has married Queenie and brought her back to London. Ethel offers her forgiveness. With a new war still looming despite the Agreement, Queenie leaves her baby with her parents and sails to join her husband in Singapore. (Note: Singapore fell to the Japanese in February 1942. Enemy residents were killed, interned or made prisoners of war. When the film was released in 1944, the fates of these men, women and children were still largely unknown. Singapore remained occupied until the war in the Pacific ended, in August 1945. By the time the film was released in the U.S.A., prisoners had been freed and survivors had shared their accounts.) Faced with an empty nest, Frank and Ethel leave their house to move to a flat with Billy and Queenie's son. The film closes with a tracking shot of 1939 London.

== Cast ==
- Robert Newton as Frank Gibbons
- Celia Johnson as Ethel Gibbons
- Alison Leggatt as Aunt Sylvia
- Stanley Holloway as Bob Mitchell
- John Mills as Billy Mitchell
- Kay Walsh as Queenie Gibbons
- Amy Veness as Mrs. Flint
- Eileen Erskine as Vi Gibbons
- John Blythe as Reg Gibbons
- Guy Verney as Sam Leadbitter
- Betty Fleetwood as Phyllis (Phyl) Blake
- Merle Tottenham as Edie, the Gibbonses' maid

== Title ==
The title, a reference to the English people, is a phrase from John of Gaunt's monologue in Act II, Scene 1 of William Shakespeare's Richard II. In 1944, it would have resonated with British audiences.

This fortress built by Nature for herself
Against infection and the hand of war,
This happy breed of men, this little world,
This precious stone set in the silver sea,
Which serves it in the office of a wall
Or as a moat defensive to a house,
Against the envy of less happier lands,
This blessed plot, this earth, this realm, this England.

== Production ==
In 1942, David Lean and Noël Coward co-directed In Which We Serve. This Happy Breed marked Lean's solo directorial debut. He and Coward later teamed for Brief Encounter and Blithe Spirit.

Writing for TCM in February 2006, Frank Tatara says: "To a certain degree, Coward tried to have it both ways with This Happy Breed. By this point in his career, he had already cultivated the aura of high-breeding that informed most of his work. But he was raised in the same working-class environment that's covered in both his play and Lean's picture, and some of his collaborators noted a bit of a mean streak in his writing, even as he sought to celebrate the 'common' Brit. 'There is something condescending about the writing,' Anthony Havelock-Allan, the film's co-producer and co-screenwriter, noted. 'The condescension is that he escaped from it and really, how awful they were, seen from his superior and, by adoption, upper-class attitude.' “

Coward had played Frank Gibbons on stage, and he wanted to reprise the role on screen. Lean felt the playwright's public persona of witty sophistication was so far removed from his humble lower class origins that audiences would be unable to accept him as Gibbons, and he initially offered the role to Robert Donat instead. Donat refused the role because he objected to the final speech delivered by his character in the stage version. As he explained in a letter to Coward: "Rightly or wrongly, I believe it is just that very political irresponsibility that got us into another war". The role was given to Robert Newton, whose reputation for alcoholism led the producers to require Newton to sign a contract relinquishing £500 of his £9,000 salary, every time his drinking caused a delay in production. According to the film's cameraman Ronald Neame, by the end of filming, Newton had forfeited his entire salary, although the producers forgave him and paid his full fee.

Lean insisted on filming This Happy Breed on three-strip Technicolor stock, although the film was difficult to acquire in Britain during the war. At the time, a Technicolor representative was assigned to the set of every film that utilised the process to ensure everything looked right on film. Lean was contractually required to follow strictly the guidelines proposed by the consultant (Joan Bridge), whose expertise he questioned and who drove him to distraction because of her concentration on the minutest details. The released film barely resembles a standard Technicolor film, which was Lean's intention. It proved to be the most successful British release of 1944 and the first of many critically acclaimed films directed by him.

In an article on BFI's Screenonline website, Janet Moat singles out "the breathtaking opening sequence, a stunning aerial view of London, from the Thames and across the rooftops, down to the back door of one particular house and right through it to the front door", narrated by Laurence Olivier. "Lean was already employing one of his trademark devices of 'leaking' one scene into another – a new scene begins before the previous one has quite faded away. He especially uses sound to anticipate the next scene, keeping the audience in a constant state of expectation. One sequence in particular uses sound quite brilliantly. When Reg and his wife are killed in a car crash, Vi goes out into the garden to find Frank and Ethel and tell them the awful news. The camera stays in the living room while the radio plays a loud dance tune, and the happy sound of children playing outside is heard. Eventually Frank and Ethel come into the frame, from the garden, the soundtrack making a poignant counterpoint to their silent grief".

Between March 2006 and January 2008, the restoration of This Happy Breed, combining digital and photochemical techniques, was carried out at the British Film Institute's National Archive's Conservation Centre in Berkhamsted and at Cineric, a post-production facility which combines optical printing and photochemical restoration with innovative digital techniques, in New York City. The project included correcting the colour and a full digital restoration of the picture and soundtrack. The most time-consuming part of the sound restoration process involved removing background noise that caused dialogue to become muffled when conventional methods of noise reduction were used to remove it. Technicians had to filter the noise between individual words to eliminate static. The restored film was screened as part of a major David Lean retrospective at BFI Southbank in mid-2008.

The film's soundtrack, which includes the song London Pride, was performed by the London Symphony Orchestra, conducted by Muir Mathieson.

== Reception ==
=== Box office ===
According to Kinematograph Weekly the 'biggest winners' at the box office in 1944 Britain were For Whom the Bell Tolls, This Happy Breed, The Song of Bernadette, Going My Way, This Is the Army, Jane Eyre, The Story of Dr. Wassell, Cover Girl, The White Cliffs of Dover, Sweet Rosie O'Grady and Fanny By Gaslight. Breed was the biggest British hit of the year followed by Fanny By Gaslight, The Way Ahead and Love Story.

=== Critical ===
In his 14 April 1947, review for The New York Times, Bosley Crowther noted the four-year delay: "Why its release here should be tardy is a puzzler to us. For "This Happy Breed," (is) an absorbing and affecting panorama of English life... (It) has a quiet charm and gentle penetration of human nature which should give it wide appeal... the story of... a plain and inconsequential family living in one of those plain little houses in a row in a plain and inconsequential London suburb between 1919 and 1939. ....Through it all, 'Mum' and 'Dad' pursue their steady and inevitably hum-drum lives, partaking of joys and sorrows as they are naturally visited upon them. Grandma and maiden Aunt Sylvia are thorns in their patient sides, but even the crotchets of these females would be missed... crises are usually soothed by a cup of hot tea. 'It's up to us ordinary people to keep things steady,' says Dad. And there you are.... Producer Anthony Havelock-Allan, Director David Lean and Ronald Neame, the cameraman... show us a house, a neighborhood and people of a wholly credible sort, and they have drawn from their excellent performers some of the neatest characterizations you'd want to see. Robert Newton and Celia Johnson (she was in "Brief Encounter," you'll recall) are brilliant as the father and mother—quiet, patient and genuine—while Kay Walsh is shrewd as the way-ward daughter and John Mills is stanch as her earnest beau. Amy Veness and Alison Leggatt are delicious as Grandma and Aunt Syl,.. (The film) hits precisely the humor, the grief and the monotony of commonplace life. Maybe it won't tempt the searchers for glamour and 'escape,' but it should be gratifying entertainment for those who put their faith in the human heart".

In a 1944 review, Variety gave This Happy Breed high praise: "Based on Noel Coward's London legit hit, film soundly captures the spirit of the 1920s and 1930s reviving the era of the British general strike, the jazz dress style, the Charleston, and the depression. It touches on the troubled sphere of the class struggle and labor strife, although it has a dubious note once or twice, such as in an apparent defense of strike-breaking. But it is so much more the history of an average British family, with its pleasures and pains, to make this the paramount interest. Film is a bit episodic and choppy at the start, as it unwinds in cavalcadish fashion, but it settles down soon to an absorbing chronicle. Film’s excellence comes mainly in the performances. Celia Johnson, as the mother of three grown children and the rock around which the family revolves, presents a masterful, poignant portrayal. Robert Newton… is also a superb presentation as the steady, earth-bound but intelligent Britisher. Kay Walsh, as the flighty daughter dissatisfied with her lot; John Mills as the loyal sailor in love with the errant daughter; and Stanley Holloway as the nextdoor neighbour, give fine support".

Writing for TCM in February 2006, Frank Tatara observes: "Coward follows various members of the Gibbons clan as they pass through a variety of highs and lows that make for an engrossing, if rather contrived War-time soap opera. Pregnancy, secret affairs, spiritualism, and auto accidents all come into play at one point or another, with the family stoically riding the rough seas of British life. It's no wonder that audiences at the time responded to it".

The film holds a 100% fresh rating on Rotten Tomatoes, based on 12 reviews.

TV Guide rates the film four stars and called it "an immensely charming movie, with many tears and many moments of warmth."

Time Out London says, "Though Lean and Coward are less happy here than in the brittle, refined atmosphere of Brief Encounter, their adventurous excursion into suburban Clapham remains endlessly fascinating."

Radio Times gives it five out of five stars and said "This second of David Lean's four collaborations with Noël Coward provides a fascinating picture of the way we were. ... such is the ebb and flow of events (both domestic and historical) that the two hours it takes to cover the 20 inter-war years seem to fly by. Celia Johnson is superb ....the best scenes belong to neighbours Robert Newton and Stanley Holloway".

== Awards and nominations ==
The National Board of Review named Celia Johnson Best Actress for her portrayal of Ethel Gibbons.
