= The Bishop's Wife =

1947 film directed by Henry Koster

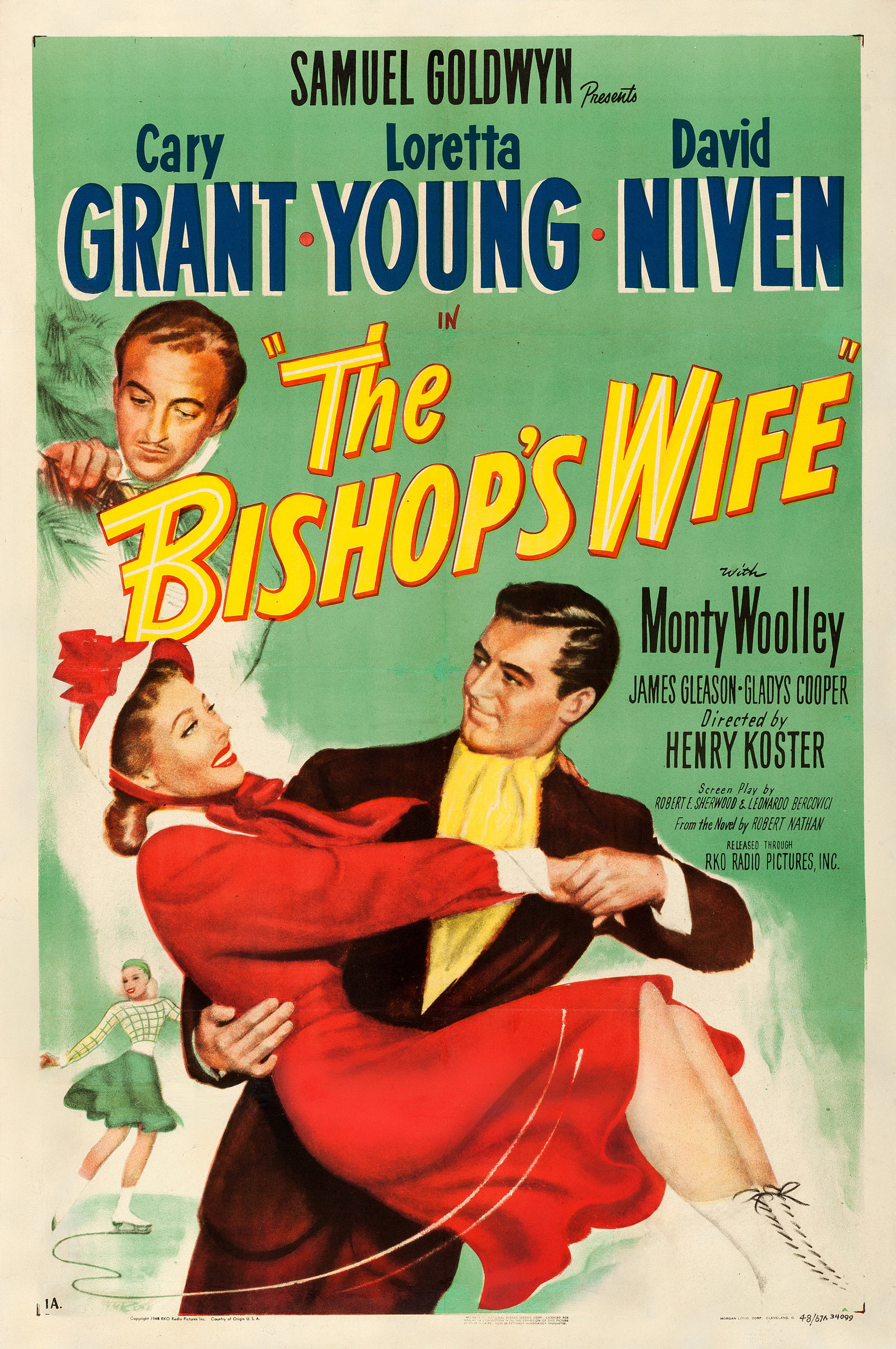
- Theatrical release poster by William Rose
- Directed by: Henry Koster
- Screenplay by: Leonardo Bercovici; Robert E. Sherwood; Billy Wilder (uncredited); Charles Brackett (uncredited)
- Based on: The Bishop's Wife; 1928 novella by Robert Nathan
- Produced by: Samuel Goldwyn
- Starring: Cary Grant; Loretta Young; David Niven
- Cinematography: Gregg Toland
- Edited by: Monica Collingwood
- Music by: Hugo Friedhofer
- Production company: Samuel Goldwyn Productions
- Distributed by: RKO Radio Pictures
- Release dates: November 25, 1947 (Premiere); December 9, 1947 (New York City); February 16, 1948 (United States)
- Running time: 109 minutes (Note: 2013 release of Blu-ray from Warner Home Video is slightly cut.)
- Country: United States
- Language: English
- Box office: $3 million (US rentals)

The Bishop's Wife is a 1947 American Christmas romantic fantasy comedy film directed by Henry Koster, starring Cary Grant, Loretta Young and David Niven. The plot is about an angel who helps a bishop with his problems. The film was adapted by Leonardo Bercovici and Robert E. Sherwood from the 1928 novel of the same name by Robert Nathan.

It was remade in 1996 as The Preacher's Wife starring Denzel Washington, Whitney Houston, and Courtney B. Vance.

== Plot ==
Bishop Henry Brougham, having difficulties finding the funding for the building of a new cathedral, prays for divine guidance. His plea is seemingly answered by a suave angel named Dudley, who reveals his heavenly identity only to the clergyman.

Dudley's mission turns out, however, not to be to help construct a cathedral, but to guide Henry and the people around him spiritually. Henry has become obsessed with raising funds, to the detriment of his family life. His relationships with wife Julia and their young daughter Debby are strained by his focus on the cathedral. Particularly difficult are his meetings with rich people whom he hopes will fund the cathedral. Among these people are the widowed Agnes Hamilton, who has promised to donate one million dollars for the construction, but expects that the cathedral will have significant elements honoring her late husband. Henry disagrees strongly with her intentions, but needs the donation.

Everyone, except for Henry, is charmed by Dudley, even the non-religious Professor Wutheridge. When Dudley spends time cheering up Julia, he finds himself strongly attracted to her. Sensing this, Henry becomes jealous and anxious for his now unwelcome guest to finish and depart. He reveals Dudley's true identity to Professor Wutheridge, who urges him to stand up and fight for the woman he loves.

Henry meets with Agnes and apologizes for his resistance to her wishes. Later, Dudley meets with Agnes, and they talk about her one true love - not her husband - whom she opted not to marry due to her fear of poverty. Agnes has a tearful change of heart and meets again with Henry and Julia to let them know that she no longer wants to give her money to the building of the cathedral but wishes to give her money to help the poor, with Henry directing that effort.

On several occasions throughout the film, Dudley is shown to have special powers as an angel. He helps Julia and Sylvester (a taxi driver) ice skate like pros, decorates the Broughams' Christmas tree in seconds, dictates to a typewriter to magically produce Henry's new sermon—without Henry's knowledge— and other smaller things.

Eventually, Dudley hints to Julia his desire to stay with her and not move on to his next "assignment". Although Julia doesn't fully understand what he's talking about, she senses what he means and tells him it is time for him to leave. Dudley tells the bishop it is rare for an angel to envy a mortal. As Dudley prepares to leave, Henry complains to Dudley that his prayer had not been answered (since the cathedral will not be built); Dudley reminds Henry that he did not pray for a cathedral, but for guidance, which has been given to him.

With his mission completed and now knowing that Julia loves her husband, Dudley leaves, promising never to return, but satisfied that his work is done. All memories of him are erased, and later that Christmas Eve at midnight, Henry delivers the sermon he believes he has written.

== Cast ==
- Cary Grant as Dudley
- Loretta Young as Julia Brougham
- David Niven as Bishop Henry Brougham
- Monty Woolley as Professor Wutheridge
- James Gleason as Sylvester, a sympathetic taxi driver
- Gladys Cooper as Mrs. Agnes Hamilton
- Elsa Lanchester as Matilda, the Broughams' housekeeper
- Sara Haden as Mildred Cassaway, the Bishop's secretary
- Karolyn Grimes as Debby Brougham, the Broughams' daughter
- Tito Vuolo as Maggenti
- Regis Toomey as Reverend Miller
- Sarah Edwards as Mrs. Duffy
- Margaret McWade as Miss Trumbull
- Anne O'Neal as Mrs. Ward
- Ben Erway as Mr. Perry
- Erville Alderson as Stevens
- Bobby Anderson as Defense Captain (Snowball fight) & boys choir
- Teddy Infuhr as Attack Captain (Snowball fight)
- Eugene Borden as Michel
- Almira Sessions as first lady in Michel's
- Claire Du Brey (credited as Claire DuBrey) as second lady
- Florence Auer as third lady
- Margaret Wells as hat shop proprietress
- Kitty O'Neil (credited as Kitty O'Neill) as hat shop customer
- Isabel Jewell as hysterical mother
- David Leonard as blind man
- Dorothy Vaughan as Delia
- Edgar Dearing as policeman
- The Mitchell Boychoir as vocal ensemble

Niven was originally cast as the angel, Dana Andrews as the bishop, and Teresa Wright as his wife. However, Wright had to bow out due to pregnancy. According to Robert Osborne, Andrews was lent to RKO in order to obtain Loretta Young. Koster then brought in Cary Grant, but he wanted to play the angel, so the role of the bishop was given to Niven.

== Production ==
In markets where the original title was kept, the posters had a black text box added

In some U.S. markets, the film was retitled Cary and the Bishop's Wife

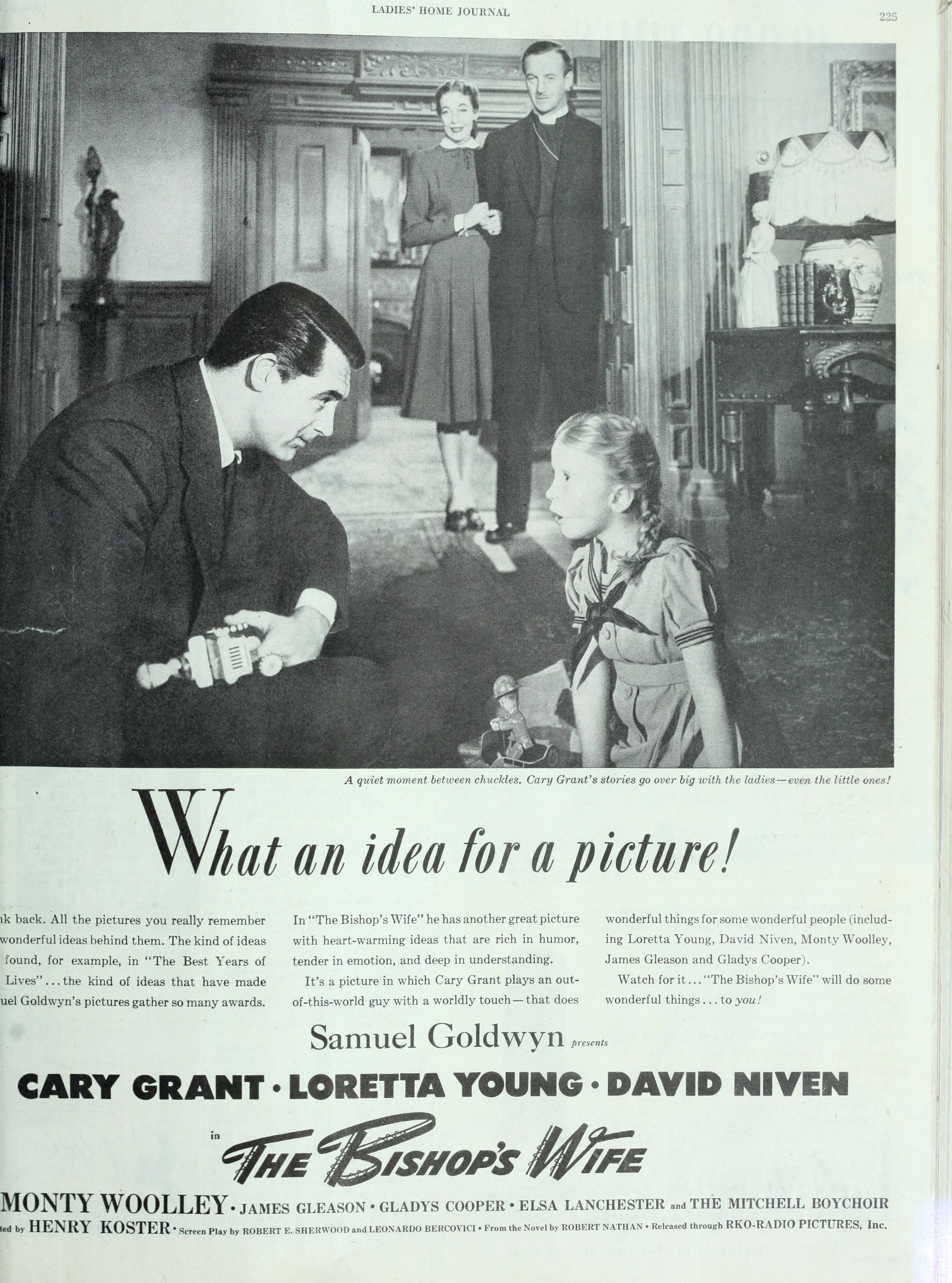
Advertisement in the Ladies' Home Journal

The film's production faced several difficulties. Producer Samuel Goldwyn replaced director William A. Seiter with Henry Koster to create a completely new film. In early previews, audiences disliked the film, so Billy Wilder and Charles Brackett made uncredited rewrites. Though the premiere of The Bishop's Wife was acclaimed by critics as a success, the film did not initially perform well at the box office. Market research showed that moviegoers avoided the film because they thought it was religious. As a result, Goldwyn decided to retitle it Cary and the Bishop's Wife for certain US markets, while adding a black text box with the question "Have you heard about CARY AND THE BISHOP'S WIFE?" on posters in markets where the film kept the original title. By adding Grant's first name to the title, the film's business increased by as much as 25 percent.

Location filming was in Minneapolis, Minnesota. In the scene in which Dudley conducts the boys' choir, the Charles Gounod composition 'Noël: Montez à Dieu' ('O Sing to God') was performed by the Robert Mitchell Boys Choir. Emil Newman and Herbert W. Spencer's melody, "Lost April," was given lyrics by Eddie DeLange and recorded by Nat King Cole.

== Release ==
The film was the second to be chosen for a Royal Command Performance and premiered at the Odeon cinema in London on November 25, 1947. Its American premiere was at the Astor Theatre in New York City.

== Reception ==
On the review aggregator website Rotten Tomatoes, The Bishop's Wife holds an approval rating of 85% based on 26 reviews. The website's critical consensus reads, "The Bishop's Wife succeeds thanks to the strength of winning performances from a stellar cast, which includes Cary Grant and Loretta Young." Metacritic, which uses a weighted average, assigned the film a score of 72 out of 100, based on 11 critics, indicating "generally favorable" reviews.

== Awards and nominations ==
Award	Category	Nominee(s)	Result	Ref.
Academy Awards	Best Motion Picture	Samuel Goldwyn Productions	Nominated	
Academy Awards	Best Director	Henry Koster	Nominated	
Academy Awards	Best Film Editing	Monica Collingwood	Nominated	
Academy Awards	Best Scoring of a Dramatic or Comedy Picture	Hugo Friedhofer	Nominated	
Academy Awards	Best Sound Recording	Gordon E. Sawyer	Won	

== Adaptations to other media ==
The Bishop's Wife was dramatized as a half-hour radio play on the March 1, 1948, broadcast of The Screen Guild Theater with Cary Grant, Loretta Young and David Niven in their original film roles. It was also presented on Lux Radio Theater three times as an hour-long broadcast: first on December 19, 1949, with Tyrone Power and David Niven, second on May 11, 1953, with Cary Grant and Phyllis Thaxter and third on March 1, 1955, again with Grant and Thaxter.

The soundtrack has been released on compact disc.

The 1996 film The Preacher's Wife was a remake based on The Bishop's Wife.

== See also ==
- List of films about angels
- List of Christmas films
