= The People Against O'Hara =

1951 film by John Sturges

- Theatrical release poster
- Directed by: John Sturges
- Screenplay by: John Monks Jr.
- Based on: The People Against O'Hara; 1950 novel by Eleazar Lipsky
- Produced by: William H. Wright
- Starring: Spencer Tracy; Pat O'Brien; James Arness
- Cinematography: John Alton
- Edited by: Gene Ruggiero
- Music by: Carmen Dragon
- Distributed by: Metro-Goldwyn-Mayer
- Release date: September 1, 1951 (United States)
- Running time: 102 minutes
- Country: United States
- Language: English
- Budget: $1 million
- Box office: $1.7 million

The People Against O'Hara is a 1951 American crime film noir directed by John Sturges and based on the 1950 novel of the same name by Eleazar Lipsky. The film features Spencer Tracy, Pat O'Brien, John Hodiak and James Arness.

== Plot ==
James Curtayne, once a successful New York district attorney, lost his career to alcoholism. After a long time away from the profession, he now practices civil law. When Johnny O'Hara, a boy from the old neighborhood, is accused of murder, his parents beg Curtayne to take the case, although they are unable to pay, and he accepts, acknowledging that it will be tough, both personally and professionally. Curtayne, a widower, lives with his doting daughter Ginny. She has delayed her marriage to her fiancé Jeff for two years to help her father stay sober.

Johnny's boss, Bill Sheffield, was shot and robbed by two people, and a witness observed the killing from a long distance. Police trace the culprits' car to Johnny. When detectives arrive to question him, Johnny flees, claiming that he believed that they were thugs seeking revenge. During Johnny's questioning, detective Vicent Ricks and district attorney Louis Barra reveal that the murder weapon was also his. Johnny claims that both the car and the weapon had been stolen. A young punk named Frank Korvac claims that he was the driver and fingers Johnny as the trigger man.

Johnny admits that he had argued with Sheffield that day but insists that he had been working all night. However, a night watchman refutes Johnny's claim. In reality, Johnny had been with his lover Katrina, the young wife of Knuckles Lanzetti, a tough mobster who controls the waterfront. Knowing what would happen to Katrina if he reveals the truth, Johnny lies to Barra and Curtayne.

Curtayne visits the Korvac family, who cannot help him, and Knuckles, who is suspicious of his own involvement and offers to provide information in exchange for favors, which Curtayne refuses.

At trial, Johnny's alibi about being at work all night is shattered. Frank is defiant on the witness stand and Curtayne is unable to rattle him. Curtayne confides in Ricks that his mind is failing him. He begins to drink at a bar, where he meets the eyewitness, Norwegian sailor Sven Norson, who offers to change his story for $500. Curtayne, desperate, writes a check for Norson.

Barra quickly discovers the bribe and informs Curtayne. Johnny is found guilty and sentenced to death. Ricks informs Curtayne about Johnny's involvement with Katrina, and Curtayne confronts her. Grief-stricken, she professes the truth to Barra, but Johnny denies it, wishing to protect her.

Curtayne, Ricks and Barra revisit the crime, trying to determine a motive. An empty suitcase surfaces that is found to secretly contain $200,000 worth of narcotics. The men devise a scheme to plant a lookalike suitcase and entrap whoever comes to steal it. Knuckles, who owes a debt to Curtayne, agrees to spread the word around town about the suitcase. Curtayne, wired for sound, volunteers to deliver it and await the true murderer. The culprit is revealed to be the eldest Korvacs brother, who abducts Curtayne and marches him with the suitcase toward the river and certain death.

Barra orders a police dragnet to surround the area. A policewoman volunteers to intercept Korvacs, which results in a gun battle that mortally injures Curtayne.

== Cast ==
- Spencer Tracy as James Curtayne
- Pat O'Brien as Det. Vincent Ricks
- Diana Lynn as Ginny
- John Hodiak as D.A. Louis Barra
- James Arness as Johnny O'Hara
- Eduardo Ciannelli as Knuckles Lanzetta
- William Campbell as Frank Korvac
- Yvette Duguay as Katrina
- Jay C. Flippen as Sven Norson
- Richard Anderson as Jeff Chapman
- Charles Bronson as Angelo Korvac

== Production ==
The film's production included ten days of location shooting in New York at Fulton Fish Market, courthouses and in tenement neighborhoods of the Lower East Side.

The film marks the first screen pairing of childhood friends Spencer Tracy with Pat O'Brien and the first time that they had acted together in nearly 30 years. They would later star together in The Last Hurrah (1958).

== Release ==
According to MGM records, the film earned $1,107,000 in the U.S. and Canada and $588,000 elsewhere, resulting in a $22,000 profit.

== Reception ==
In a contemporary review for The New York Times, critic Bosley Crowther called the film "a curiously old-fashioned courtroom drama" and wrote: "John Sturges' smooth and level-headed direction is all that could be asked, in fact. Our quarrel is with Mr. Tracy's performance and the slack writing and meandering of the screen play ... [O]n the whole the picture moves ploddingly. ... Mr. Tracy squares his homespun jaw occasionally for the sake of justice, and that in itself may satisfy his followers. But most of the time he slouches through his role, blinking, tweaking his nose, mumbling sheepishly and looking as though he's about to hang a fishing rod—home-made, of course—over the jury box railing."

Critic Philip K. Scheuer of the Los Angeles Times wrote: "Director John Sturges has kept the histrionics well under control and still permitted us to rediscover how pleasurable an actor Mr. Tracy really is, with his now almost white head of hair and the great big smile that is like a personal pat on the arm when it comes our way. The others are all effortlessly expert too ... Only occasionally I wished Sturges had prodded them into talking up a little."

== Adaptation ==
On March 9, 1953, The People Against O'Hara was presented as a one-hour adaptation starring Walter Pidgeon on Lux Radio Theatre.
