= Eileen Erskine =

English actress (1914–1995)

- from theatre programme for Time and the Conways, 1937
- Born: 15 August 1914; Nottingham, Nottinghamshire, England
- Died: 8 November 1995 (aged 81); Chiddingfold, Surrey, England
- Years active: 1937–1977
- Spouse(s): Philip Friend (m. 1941; died 1987)
- Children: 2

Eileen Marian Adams Erskine (15 August 1914 – 8 November 1995) was an English actress from Nottingham who was active in film mainly in the 1940s.

== Biography ==
During her film career, Erskine appeared in This Happy Breed (1944) and Great Expectations (1946). Her theatre work included the original West End production of J. B. Priestley's Time and the Conways in 1937; and on Broadway she was in Faithfully Yours, in 1951. Her television appearances included BBC TV's The Pallisers in 1974

Erskine's autobiography, Scenes from a Life, was published posthumously.

== Filmography ==
Year	Title	Role	Notes
1940	The Midas Touch	Rosalie	
1941	Sheepdog of the Hills	Miss Appleby, postmistress	Uncredited
1944	This Happy Breed	Vi	
1944	The Way Ahead	Mrs Hilda Parsons	
1946	Great Expectations	Biddy	
1948	Hills of Home	Belle Saunders	
1952	Lady Possessed	Violet	
