= Adella Kean Zametkin =

American journalist (1863–1931)

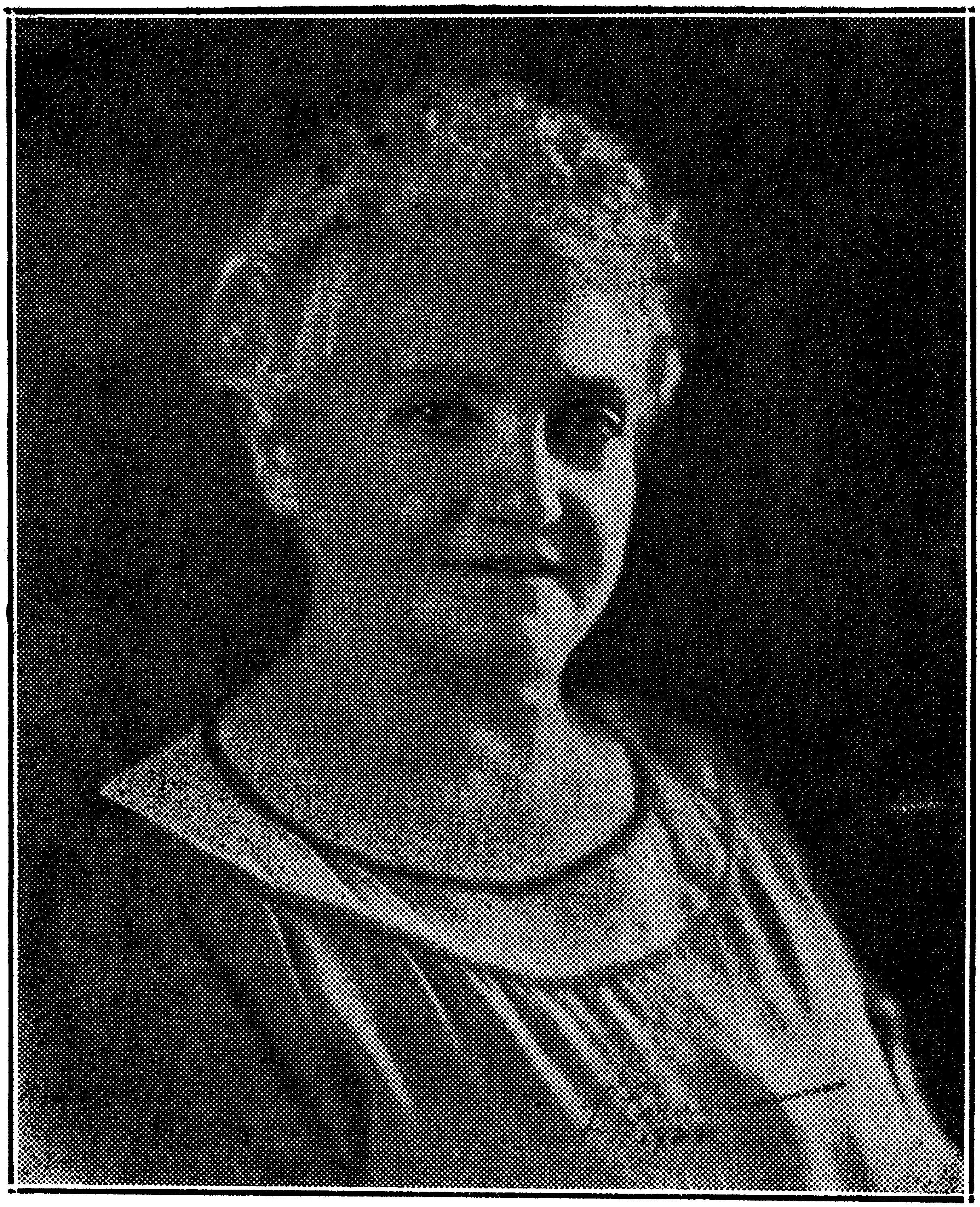
Zametkin c. 1930

Adella Kean Zametkin (born Adella Emanuelovna Khean; October 12, 1863 – May 19, 1931) was an American writer and activist.

== Life ==
Zametkin was born on October 12, 1863, in Mohyliv-Podilskyi, Russian Empire, in modern-day Ukraine, as Adella Emanuelovna Khean. Her parents were saloon-keepers.

Adella Kean was given private lessons from a tutor at an early age, and as a young woman was a tutor herself to poor girls. She immigrated to America in 1888 and quickly gravitated towards the socialist movement. She participated in the Socialist Labor Party, lectured in women's groups, and contributed to leading socialist publications. She helped found The Forward in 1897 and worked as its cashier. She wrote and lectured on women's issues like nutrition, hygiene, birth control, and child education. She focused on aiding Americanizing poor Jews on the Lower East Side, and was credited with organizing several women's organizations.

She married Mikhail Zametkin whom she met while he was agitating for the Socialist Labor Party. Zametkin translated several books into Yiddish, including Nikolay Chernyshevsky's What is to Be Done and Émile Zola's La Bête humaine. In 1930, she published Der froys handbukh (The woman's handbook).

In 1918, Zametkin began running a weekly column in Der Tog called Fun a froy tsu froyen (From one woman/wife to another), which was soon supplemented by a second weekly column called In der froyen velt (In the world of women/wives). The columns included mainly advice on household management like cooking tips and recipes as well as teaching women about topics like microbes and the importance of getting fresh air, with the goal of making Jewish working-class immigrant more educated of modern American society She also wrote about history, science, notable women like Florence Nightingale.

In 1928, Zametkin ran for the New York State Assembly as a Socialist in Queens County's 4th District, losing to Republican Robert J. Hunt. She ran again in the same district in 1929, losing to Democrat Joseph D. Nunan. She ran for a third time in the district in 1930, losing to Democrat James A. Burke. The district was in Jamaica, Queens. While she lost each election, she polled more votes than any other previous Socialist candidate had in the district.

In 1889, she married labor leader Michael Zametkin. They had a son and two daughters, including Laura Z. Hobson.

== Death ==
Zametkin died following a long illness at Presbyterian Hospital on May 19, 1931.
