= Gentleman's Agreement =

1947 film by Elia Kazan

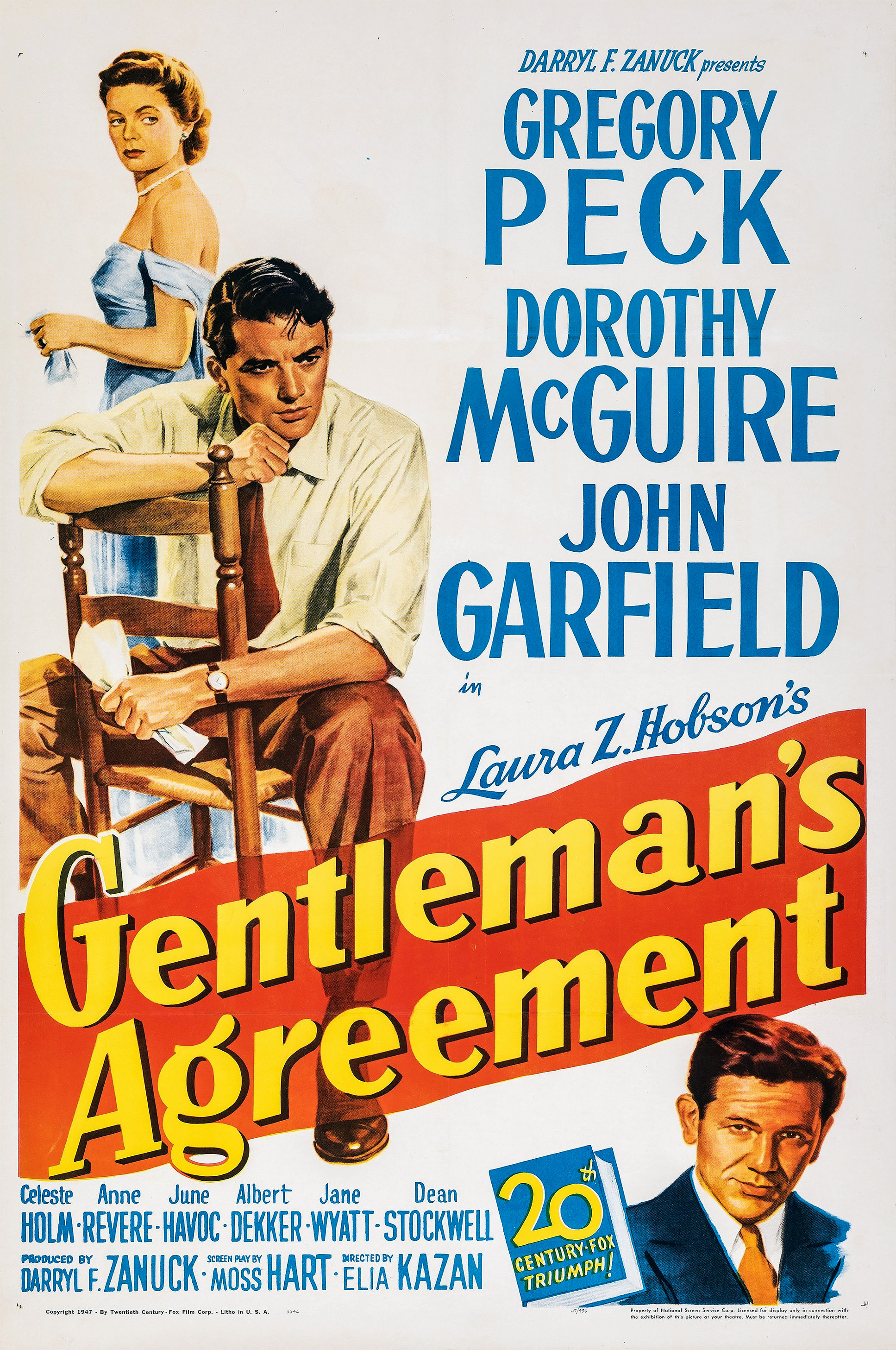
- Theatrical release poster
- Directed by: Elia Kazan
- Screenplay by: Moss Hart; Elia Kazan (screenplay revision) (uncredited)
- Based on: Gentleman's Agreement by Laura Z. Hobson
- Produced by: Darryl F. Zanuck
- Starring: Gregory Peck; Dorothy McGuire; John Garfield; Celeste Holm; Anne Revere; June Havoc; Albert Dekker; Jane Wyatt; Dean Stockwell
- Cinematography: Arthur C. Miller
- Edited by: Harmon Jones
- Music by: Alfred Newman
- Distributed by: 20th Century-Fox
- Release date: November 11, 1947 (New York City)
- Running time: 118 minutes
- Country: United States
- Budget: $1.9 million
- Box office: $7.8 million

Gentleman's Agreement is a 1947 American drama film based on Laura Z. Hobson's best-selling 1947 novel of the same title, directed by Elia Kazan. The film is about a journalist (played by Gregory Peck) who pretends to be Jewish to research an exposé on the widespread antisemitism in New York City and the affluent communities of New Canaan and Darien, Connecticut. It was nominated for eight Academy Awards and won three: Best Picture, Best Supporting Actress (Celeste Holm), and Best Director (Elia Kazan).

The movie was controversial in its day, as was a similar film on the same subject, Crossfire, which was released the same year (though that film was originally a story about homophobia, later changed to antisemitism).

In 2017, the film was selected for preservation in the United States National Film Registry by the Library of Congress as being "culturally, historically, or aesthetically significant".

== Plot ==
Widowed journalist Philip Schuyler Green moves to New York City with his aging mother and his young son, Tommy. Phil meets with magazine publisher John Minify, who asks Green, a gentile, to write an article on antisemitism. At first, he is not enthusiastic about the story.

At a lunch party, Phil meets Minify's niece Kathy Lacey, who is actually the person who suggested the story idea. The next day, at home, Phil admits his surprise after learning that the idea came from "a girl". His mother mocks him for his anti-female prejudice. Phil then tries to explain anti-Jewish prejudice to his son. Realizing how difficult it is to explain these topics, he decides to write the story.

Phil and Kathy begin dating and Phil adopts a Jewish identity to write the story from a fresh perspective. They agree to keep it secret that Phil is not Jewish. Despite seeming to have liberal views, Kathy is taken aback after learning of Phil's plan.

Phil is assigned a secretary, Elaine Wales, who turns out to be Jewish. Being told there were no openings at the magazine after she applied under her true name, she reapplied using an anglicized named and was hired. After learning of Wales' experience from Phil, Minify orders the magazine to adopt hiring policies that are open to Jews. Phil meets fashion editor Anne Dettrey, who becomes a good friend and potentially more, particularly as strains develop between Phil and Kathy.

After completing his service in WWII, Dave Goldman, Phil's childhood friend, moves to New York and lives with the Greens while searching for a job and a home for his family. Being Jewish, Dave also experiences antisemitism. Housing is scarce in the city, but it is particularly difficult for him, since not all landlords will rent to a Jewish family.

While researching his story, Phil experiences several incidents of bigotry. When Phil's mother becomes ill with a heart condition, the doctor discourages him from consulting a specialist with a Jewish name. After hearing Phil is Jewish, the doctor becomes uncomfortable and leaves.

In addition, the janitor is shocked that Phil has added a Jewish name (Greenberg), below his name (Green), on the mail box. Furthermore, when Phil wants to celebrate his honeymoon at a swanky hotel, the manager refuses to register Phil, whom he tells to go elsewhere.

Tommy also becomes the target of bullies because of this. Phil is troubled by the way Kathy consoles Tommy, telling him their taunts of "dirty Jew" are wrong because he is not Jewish, not that the epithet is wrong in and of itself.

Kathy's attitudes are revealed further when she and Phil announce their engagement. Her sister Jane invites them to a celebration in her home in Darien, which is known to be a community where Jews are not welcome. Fearing an awkward scene, Kathy wants to tell her family and friends that Phil only pretends to be Jewish, but he dissuades her. At the party, everyone is friendly to Phil, though many people cancel at the last minute.

Dave announces he will have to quit his job because he cannot find a residence for his family. Kathy owns a vacant cottage in Darien and Phil sees it as a solution to Dave's problem. Kathy, however, is unwilling to offend her neighbors by renting it to a Jewish family. Phil breaks his engagement to her and announces he will be moving away from New York when his article is published. When it comes out, it is well received by the magazine staff.

Kathy meets with Dave and tells him how sick she felt when a party guest told a bigoted joke. However, she has no answer when Dave asks her what she did about it. She realizes that remaining silent condones the prejudice.

The next day, Dave announces that he and his family will be moving into the cottage in Darien and Kathy will be moving in with her sister next door to make sure they are treated well. Moved by this, Phil reconciles with Kathy. His mother, still recovering from her heart condition, tells Phil that his article has given her new hope for the future, a new motivation to get well.

== Cast ==
Gregory Peck as Philip Schuyler Green	Anne Revere as Mrs. Green
Dorothy McGuire as Kathy Lacy	June Havoc as Elaine Wales
John Garfield as Dave Goldman	Albert Dekker as John Minify
Celeste Holm as Anne Dettrey	Jane Wyatt as Jane

=== Other cast members ===
Dean Stockwell	as Tommy Green
Nicholas Joy	as Doctor Craigie
Sam Jaffe	as Professor Fred Lieberman

== Production ==
Zanuck decided to make a film version of Hobson's novel after being refused membership in the Los Angeles Country Club, because it was assumed (incorrectly) that he was Jewish. Before filming commenced, Samuel Goldwyn and other Jewish film executives approached Darryl Zanuck and asked him not to make the film, fearing it would "stir up trouble". They also warned that Hays Code enforcer Joseph Breen might not allow the film to pass the censors, as he had been known to make disparaging remarks about Jews. There was also concern that Dorothy McGuire's character being divorced would offend the National Legion of Decency.

The role of Phillip Green was first offered to Cary Grant, but he turned it down. Peck decided to accept the role, although his agent advised him to refuse, believing Peck would be endangering his career. Jewish actor John Garfield agreed to play a lesser role in the film to be a part of it.

Portions of the film were shot on location in Darien, Connecticut.

== Reception and box-office ==
Gentleman's Agreement received a generally favorable reception from influential New York Times critic Bosley Crowther. Crowther said that "every point about prejudice which Miss Hobson had to make in her book has been made with superior illustration and more graphic demonstration in the film, so that the sweep of her moral indignation is not only widened, but intensified thereby". However, Crowther also said that the movie shared the novel's failings in that "explorations are narrowly confined to the upper-class social and professional level to which he is immediately exposed". He also said the main character's shock at the extent of anti-Semitism was lacking in credibility: "It is, in a careful analysis, an extraordinarily naive role."

On review aggregator Rotten Tomatoes, the film holds an aggregate score of 82% based on 83 critic reviews, with an average rating of 7.1/10. The website's consensus reads: "It occasionally fails to live up to its subject matter – and is perhaps an 'important' film more than a 'great' one – but the performances from Gregory Peck and Dorothy McGuire are superb."

The New York Herald Tribune described it as a "brilliant blow against racial and religious intolerance". The Daily Mirror assessed it as "the most explosive picture of the year" and "one of the most exciting and punch-laden pictures you've ever seen."

In addition to winning Academy Awards for Best Picture, Best Director, and Best Supporting Actress (Celeste Holm), Gentleman's Agreement was one of Fox's highest-grossing movies of 1947. In recognition for producing Gentleman's Agreement, the Hollywood chapter of B'nai B'rith International honored Darryl Zanuck as its "Man of the Year" for 1948. On Sunday, December 12, a gala commemoration evening was held in downtown Los Angeles at the Biltmore Hotel before a crowd of over a thousand. Among the tributes to Zanuck, New Mexico Senator Clinton Anderson said, "He does not storm up and down the streets of a community, urging its citizens to do good. He does not fill the pages of books with words that string together into a sermon. He allows you to be seated comfortably in a theater, to be absorbed in a problem and to walk out into the night with your thoughts clarified and your lips saying, 'This situation ought to be changed'." After the formal speeches there was a star-studded variety show, including the debut before the Hollywood film world of the team of Dean Martin and Jerry Lewis.

The movie was an unexpected hit at the box office. According to Variety, it earned $3.9 million in rentals in the US in 1948.

Leonard Maltin called it a "sincere ... then-daring approach to the subject matter is tame now."

== Awards and nominations ==
Award	Category	Nominee(s)	Result	Ref.
Academy Awards	Best Motion Picture	20th Century Fox	Won	
Academy Awards	Best Director	Elia Kazan	Won	
Academy Awards	Best Actor	Gregory Peck	Nominated	
Academy Awards	Best Actress	Dorothy McGuire	Nominated	
Academy Awards	Best Supporting Actress	Celeste Holm	Won	
Academy Awards	Best Supporting Actress	Anne Revere	Nominated	
Academy Awards	Best Screenplay	Moss Hart	Nominated	
Academy Awards	Best Film Editing	Harmon Jones	Nominated	
Golden Globe Awards	Best Picture		Won	
Golden Globe Awards	Best Director – Motion Picture	Elia Kazan	Won	
Golden Globe Awards	Best Supporting Actress – Motion Picture	Celeste Holm	Won	
Golden Globe Awards	Special Award – Best Juvenile Actor	Dean Stockwell	Won	
National Board of Review Awards	Top Ten Films		7th Place	
National Board of Review Awards	Best Director	Elia Kazan	Won	
National Film Preservation Board	National Film Registry		Inducted	
New York Film Critics Circle Awards	Best Film		Won	
New York Film Critics Circle Awards	Best Director	Elia Kazan (also for Boomerang!)	Won	
New York Film Critics Circle Awards	Best Actress	Celeste Holm	Nominated	
New York Film Critics Circle Awards	Best Actress	Dorothy McGuire	Nominated	
Venice International Film Festival	Grand International Prize of Venice	Elia Kazan	Nominated	

== See also ==
- Black Like Me (1964)
- Guess Who's Coming to Dinner (1967)
