= Kiss of Death (1947 film) =

1947 film by Henry Hathaway

- Original theatrical poster
- Directed by: Henry Hathaway
- Screenplay by: Ben Hecht; Charles Lederer
- Story by: Eleazar Lipsky
- Produced by: Fred Kohlmar
- Starring: Victor Mature; Brian Donlevy; Coleen Gray; Richard Widmark
- Cinematography: Norbert Brodine
- Edited by: J. Watson Webb Jr.
- Music by: David Buttolph
- Production company: 20th Century-Fox
- Distributed by: 20th Century-Fox
- Release date: August 13, 1947
- Running time: 99 minutes
- Country: United States
- Language: English
- Budget: $1.52 million
- Box office: $1.65 million (rentals)

Kiss of Death is a 1947 American film noir directed by Henry Hathaway, written by Ben Hecht and Charles Lederer from a story by Eleazar Lipsky, and starring Victor Mature, Brian Donlevy, Coleen Gray, and Richard Widmark in his film debut. Set in New York City, the film follows a thief involved in a jewelry heist who begins to give up his accomplices after his wife commits suicide while he is in prison.

The film was shot on location in New York in the spring of 1947. In postproduction, footage from the film featuring a rape and subsequent suicide was deleted due to the Motion Picture Code restrictions. 20th Century-Fox premiered the film in Los Angeles on August 13, 1947.

The film was well-received by critics and is today considered a classic of the film noir genre. At the 20th Academy Awards, the film received nominations for Best Supporting Actor (for Richard Widmark) and Best Story. Widmark also won the inaugural Golden Globe Award for New Star of the Year – Actor for his performance, as well as a Photoplay Award.

== Plot ==
On Christmas Eve in New York City, down-on-his-luck ex-convict Nick Bianco and his three colleagues rob a jewelry store. Before they can exit the building, however, the injured proprietor sets off his alarm. While attempting to escape, Nick assaults a police officer but is wounded and arrested.

Assistant District Attorney Louis D'Angelo tries to persuade Nick to name his accomplices in exchange for a light sentence. Confident that his partners in crime and his lawyer, Earl Howser, will look after his wife and two young daughters while he is incarcerated, Nick refuses and is given a 20-year sentence. Three years later, at Sing Sing Prison, after his wife does not write for three months, Nick discovers that she has committed suicide.

Nick is visited in prison by Nettie Cavallo, a young woman who used to babysit his girls. She tells him that his daughters have been sent to an orphanage. Nick decides to tell all to D'Angelo, but because so much time has elapsed, D'Angelo cannot use Nick's information about the jewelry store robbery to reduce his sentence. In exchange for being able to see his children, he spills about the job. D'Angelo then decides to keep Nick in the city jail and use him as an informant. He keeps Nick clean in the eyes of other shady characters and Howser (who acts on behalf of his criminal clients as a go-between for a fence) by making it seem Nick is being charged with a previous, unsolved robbery he pulled off with his accomplice Pete Rizzo. D'Angelo then instructs Nick to imply to the lawyer that Rizzo squealed about this job.

Howser arranges for Tommy Udo, a psychopathic killer who did time with Bianco, to take care of Rizzo. When Udo shows up at Rizzo's tenement, only the criminal's wheelchair-using mother is present; she tells Udo that her son is out, but he will return that evening. Udo examines the apartment and determines that Rizzo has probably left town. Udo binds Mrs. Rizzo to her wheelchair with an electrical cord and pushes her down a flight of stairs, killing her.

Soon after, Nick is freed on parole at D'Angelo's behest, and visits Nettie, pledging his love to her, but to remain out, Nick must continue his work with D'Angelo. He arranges a "chance" meeting with Udo and pretends to be friendly as an old prison pal from Sing Sing. Udo takes Nick to a couple of clubs, including one at which narcotics are being smoked. Nick reports back to D'Angelo, who is satisfied that he has enough to indict Udo and get a conviction. D'Angelo then releases Nick from further work.

Nick starts a new life in Astoria, Queens, with his wife, Nettie, and the children. When Udo's trial begins, D'Angelo summons Nick to let him know that his testimony is required. Despite him taking the stand, though, Udo is acquitted.

Certain that Udo will seek revenge, Nick sends Nettie and the girls to the country. He then goes to deal with Udo and finds him at Luigi's Restaurant in East Harlem. Inside, Udo threatens Nettie and the girls, whereupon Nick reminds him that during their night out, Udo gave Nick incriminating information about himself.

Udo leaves to wait in his sedan out front, which Nick notices. He telephones and summons D'Angelo to come with police to the restaurant in exactly two minutes, then goes outside. Udo shoots Nick and is quickly surrounded by police, shot, and arrested. Though badly wounded, Nick also survives; Nettie and he look forward to a happy, peaceful life together.

== Cast ==
Credits from the AFI Catalog of Feature Films:

- Victor Mature as Nick Bianco
- Brian Donlevy as A.D.A. Louis D'Angelo
- Coleen Gray as Nettie Cavallo
- Richard Widmark as Tommy Udo
- Taylor Holmes as Earl Howser
- Howard Smith as Warden
- Karl Malden as Sgt. William Cullen

Uncredited

- Mildred Dunnock as Mrs. Rizzo
- Marilee Grassini as Rosaria Bianco
- Iris Mann as Concetta Bianco
- Millard Mitchell as Detective Shelby
- Anthony Ross as "Big Ed" Williams
- Tito Vuolo as Luigi
- Eva Condon as the nun
- John Marley as Al
- Robert Karnes as Tommy's henchman

== Production ==
=== Development ===
Kiss of Death is based on a story by a former district attorney, Lawrence Blaine. It was purchased by 20th Century Fox in November 1946 specifically as a vehicle for Victor Mature. Hathaway said the idea to push the lady in the wheelchair down the stairs came from Ben Hecht. He wanted the villain Tommy Udo to be a "hophead" as a point of difference and because "they're so unpredictable. They'll shoot you or stab you, they'll do anything."

=== Casting ===
Kiss of Death is notable for being Richard Widmark's film debut as Tommy Udo (a role originally announced for Richard Conte). According to Widmark, Hathaway disliked his high hairline because he thought it made him look too intellectual, so he ordered Widmark fitted for a hairpiece. Hathaway did not send the test ahead to studio head Darryl F. Zanuck because he wanted a nightclub piano player called "Harry the Hipster" to play Udo. A Fox production manager, Charlie Hill, liked the test and sent it to Zanuck, who immediately signed Widmark. During the film, Udo uses a Benzedrine inhaler, which was suggested by Zanuck himself.

Hathaway says he was impressed by Widmark when the actor came in to read for the role of the reporter, made a test, and sent it to Zanuck.

Critics and audiences have noted Tommy Udo's similarities to Batman's archenemy the Joker. Widmark himself was a fan of the Batman comics and modeled Udo after the Joker. Frank Gorshin, who played the Riddler in the 1960's Batman television series, modeled his deranged cackle after Widmark's Udo.

Character actor Karl Malden got the part of Sergeant William Cullen while in the Broadway run of Arthur Miller's breakthrough play All My Sons. Susan Cabot and Jesse White made their screen debuts in this film; they were both uncredited. Cabot plays a restaurant patron and White plays a taxi driver. Character actor Millard Mitchell, also uncredited, plays Detective Shelby. Mildred Dunnock played Mrs. Rizzo, a woman in a wheelchair pushed down a flight of stairs to her death by psychotic Udo.

=== Filming ===
Kiss of Death was shot between March and May 1947, with additional scenes being filmed in June. Much of the filming was done in New York City, using locations as practical sets, including the Chrysler Building, the Criminal Courts Building at 100 Centre Street, the old Hotel Marguery at 270 Park Avenue at 48th Street, the St. Nicholas Arena, and the now-demolished Bronx House of Detention for Men (later known as the Bronx County Jail) at 151st Street and River Avenue.

The exterior scenes of the family home were shot in Astoria, Queens, at 14th Place and Astoria Park, and the Triboro Bridge and the Hell Gate Bridge can be seen in the background over Astoria Park.

Non-NYC locations include:

- Sing Sing Penitentiary in Ossining
- Academy of the Holy Angels in Fort Lee, New Jersey, was used as the orphanage where Nick visits his daughters. The site is now occupied by Mediterranean Towers South at 2000 Linwood Avenue. The school moved to Demarest, New Jersey, in 1965.

Hathaway later said he "loved the picture because I liked working outside. It was exciting to manoeuvre things and get work done without people on the streets knowing that you were filming." He said the only problem was Victor Mature. "He was carousing all the time and up all night and sleeping all day on the set. He was dirty. I bought him a couple of new suits, and I found him in the men's toilet, lying on the floor asleep in one of the new suits I'd bought him. But he was a good actor."

Darryl Zanuck said, "[W]e got some wonderful atmosphere" filming on location, "but we paid for it."

=== Deleted footage ===
A deleted scene involving Nick Biancos's wife Maria, who was played by Patricia Morison, was cut from the film. In this scene, a gangster (played by Henry Brandon), who is supposed to look out for her while Nick is in prison, rapes her. Afterwards, Maria commits suicide by sticking her head in the kitchen oven and turning on the gas. Both scenes were cut from the original print at the insistence of the censors, who wanted no depiction of either a rape or a suicide, so although Morison's name appears in the credits, she does not appear in the film. Mention is made later in the film of Nick's wife's suicide and a now-obscure reference is made by Nettie that the unseen gangster Rizzo contributed to the wife's downfall.

=== Alternate ending ===
Originally, Nick was supposed to die after he allowed Tommy Udo to shoot him repeatedly, so Udo could be prosecuted for his murder. However, it was deemed too depressing to have Nick die, so narration by Nick's wife, Nettie, says that Nick survives.

== Release ==
20th Century Fox released Kiss of Death theatrically, premiering it in Los Angeles on August 13, 1947. The film had its New York City premiere two weeks later.

=== Home media ===
Twentieth Century-Fox Home Entertainment issued Kiss of Death on DVD on December 6, 2005. Twilight Time released the film on Blu-ray in 2017, limited to 3,000 units.

== Reception ==
=== Box office ===
The film was not a major success but managed to break even on the world market.

=== Critical reception ===
Critic James Agee wrote in Time in 1947, "Kiss of Death ... in its own way it, too, is a clean knockout ... None of its criminals is glamorous, nor does anyone piously point out that crime does not pay. Nobody has to. The whole picture amply demonstrates the fact ... The fright and suspense of the closing sequences depend largely on the conception of the pathological Udo and on Richard Widmark's remarkable performance of the role. He is a rather frail fellow with maniacal eyes, who uses a sinister kind of falsetto baby talk laced with tittering laughter. It is clear that murder is one of the kindest things he is capable of."

Writers Raymond Borde and Etienne Chaumeton wrote: "From Henry Hathaway's Kiss of Death (1947), one will remember that nasty little creep with the wild eyes and high-pitched laugh, neurotic to the core, which Richard Widmark has turned into one of his finest roles."

Critic Nick Schager wrote: "It would be no surprise to learn that Richard Widmark was a big 'Batman' fan, as his star-making screen debut in Kiss of Death as grinning, cackling psychopath Tommy Udo (for which he received an Academy Award nomination) seems heavily indebted to the Caped Crusader's arch-nemesis, the Joker. Certainly, the live-wire actor's amoral lunatic, a fiend who delights in pushing crippled wheelchair-using women down stairs, is the primary (and perhaps only) reason to sit through Henry Hathaway's over-praised 1947 noir, a jumbled piece of cinematic crime fiction that's visually elegant (having been neorealistically shot on-location throughout Manhattan) but regularly confused about its own point of view."

Author and film critic Leonard Maltin awarded the film three out of a possible four stars, stating that the film was starting to "show its age, with cops and robbers a bit too polite", while also praising Widmark and Mature's performances. The effect of Widmark's performance as Tommy Udo found expression in a number of unusual ways. College fraternities formed Tommy Udo clubs "with the intent of putting women in their place." For years, people handed the actor blank phonograph disks on which they wanted him to record the maniacal laugh he used in the film. True-crime writer Harold Schechter described Widmark's character of Tommy Udo as "one of the most terrifying sociopaths in screen history."

Film review aggregator Rotten Tomatoes reported an approval rating of 89%, based on 18 reviews, with a rating average of 7.4/10.

=== Accolades ===
Award	Category	Nominee(s)	Result	Ref.
Academy Awards	Best Supporting Actor	Richard Widmark	Nominated	
Academy Awards	Best Motion Picture Story	Eleazar Lipsky	Nominated	
Golden Globes Awards	Most Promising Newcomer – Male	Richard Widmark	Won	
Locarno International Film Festival	Best Actor	Victor Mature	Won	
Locarno International Film Festival	Best Screenplay – Adapted	Ben Hecht and Charles Lederer	Won	

== In popular culture ==
Widmark's performance in Kiss of Death inspired the name of mystery and crime writer Donald E. Westlake's best-known continuing pseudonym, Richard Stark, under which he wrote some of his darkest, most violent books. According to Westlake, "part of (Widmark's) fascination and danger is his unpredictability. He's fast and mean, and that's what I wanted the writing to be: crisp and lean, no fat, trimmed down ... stark."

== Adaptations ==
- On January 12, 1948, Widmark, Victor Mature, and Coleen Gray reprised their screen roles for a Lux Radio Theatre broadcast. Mature and Widmark also reprised their screen roles for three broadcasts on The Screen Guild Theater, the first of which aired on October 28, 1948.
- In the anthology film O. Henry's Full House, Henry Hathaway directed the segment entitled "The Clarion Call", with Richard Widmark playing creepy psychopath Johnny Kernan, a reprise of his Tommy Udo character.
- A 1958 Western version of the film was made, this time entitled, The Fiend Who Walked the West, directed by Gordon Douglas and starring Hugh O'Brian and Robert Evans.
- Another remake, also named Kiss of Death, was made in 1995, directed by Barbet Schroeder and starring David Caruso, Nicolas Cage, Samuel L. Jackson, and Helen Hunt. The remake kept the crime plot in place, but omitted Tommy Udo.
