= Michael Zametkin =

American journalist (1859–1935)

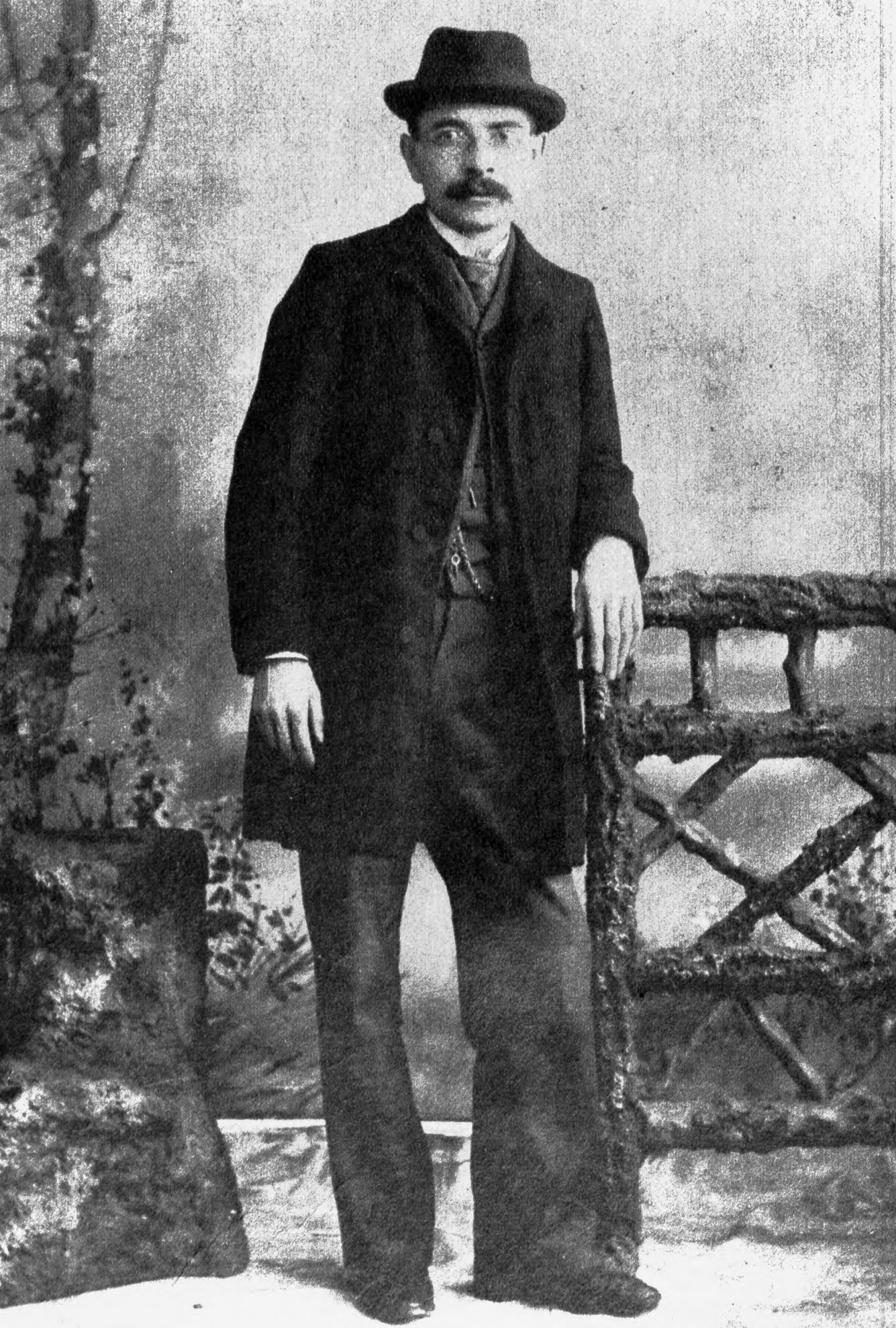
Zametkin in 1893

Michael Zametkin (January 6, 1859 – March 7, 1935) was a Ukrainian-born American labor activist.

== Life ==
Zametkin was born on January 6, 1859, in Odessa, Russian Empire, the son of papakhi manufacturer Chaim Yoel and Malka.

Zametkin attended the Odessa Commercial School. He was involved in the revolutionary movement from a young age, and in 1877-1878 he was one of the 28 members of the first Odessa “kruzshok" (circle), which established an illegal school to teach Jewish youngsters Russian and socialism. By 1880, he was being watched by the police. In 1882, he immigrated to America for political reasons as the head of the first Odessa Am Olam and settled in New York City.

Shortly after arriving in America, Zametkin took a prominent position as a pioneer in the Jewish socialist movement. He was involved in a number of associations and organizations in that movement throughout the 1880s and 1890s. He spent years stitching shirts for 4-5 dollars a week, and he was a main organizer of a shirtmakers union, one of the first Jewish trade unions in America, together with Morris Hillquit and Louis Miller. He supported Henry George's campaign for mayor of New York City in 1886. That year, he also influenced the Jewish Worker's Association to join the Socialist Labor Party. When the Jewish Worker's Association abolished itself in 1887, he organized a Jewish branch for that party. In 1888, he separated from that branch and founded a new one for Russian-speaking Jewish socialists. He spoke and wrote in Russian during that time, only switching to Yiddish in 1892. In 1890, he was a founder of the social democratic weekly Di Arbayter Tsaytung (The Workers’ Newspaper), which he was a main leader of until the paper ceased publishing in 1902. He wrote a number of topics for the paper, including economic and socio-political issues, semi-fictional stories and allegories with a socialist character, current events, and literature. He also wrote for the daily Dos Abend Blatt (The Evening Newspaper) and Zuntog Abend Blat (Sunday Evening Newspaper).

When a rift occurred in the Socialist Labor Party in 1897, he left with the opposition and helped found The Forward. He became Abraham Cahan's right-hand man in the paper, and when Cahan resigned as editor he served as co-editor with Louis Miller from 1900 to 1901. He was a regular contributor for the paper for decades afterwards. He was also editor of the weekly Der Sotsyal-Demokrat (The Social Democrat), which began publishing in 1900. He strongly opposed a purely Jewish socialist movement and maintained a cosmopolitan socialism, although he only spoke to Jewish workers. He translated a number of books from Russian, English, and French, and wrote a play in 1906 called A Russian Shylock, A Play in Four Acts. He remained active as a speaker, lecturer, and writer until 1925, when he began suffering from a severe illness. He lived the last several years of his life in the Bialystoker Home for the Aged on East Broadway.

Zametkin was married to Adella Kean, a contributor to a number of Yiddish newspapers. Their daughter was novelist Laura Z. Hobson.

Zametkin died in Beth Israel Hospital on March 7, 1935. Jacob Panken, Abraham Cahan, B. C. Vladeck, and Joseph Weinberg spoke at his funeral. His body was cremated.
