= Monica Collingwood =

American film editor

- Born: Monica K. Collingwood; January 5, 1908; Jackson, Missouri, USA
- Died: October 31, 1989 (aged 81); Los Angeles, California, USA
- Occupation: Film editor
- Years active: 1947–1973
- Spouse: Willard Nico (m. 1927)

Monica Collingwood (1908–1989) was an American film editor who was nominated for the Academy Award for Best Film Editing at the 1947 Academy Awards for the Henry Koster drama The Bishop's Wife (1947).

== Biography ==
Monica was born in Jackson, Missouri, to Joseph Collingwood (a British immigrant) and Elizabeth Emery (a native of Luxembourg). When the family moved west to California, her father worked as a policeman at one of the big film studios. She married Willard Nico, a Russia-born fellow film editor, in 1927; the pair had a son, Willard Jr.

== Selected filmography ==
- The Secret Life of Walter Mitty (1947)
- The Bishop's Wife (1947)
- Fangs of the Wild (1954)
- Lassie's Great Adventure (1963)
