= Passport to Nowhere =

1947 film

- Produced by: Frederic Ullman Jr.
- Narrated by: Dwight Weist
- Distributed by: RKO Pictures
- Release date: 1947
- Country: United States
- Language: English

Passport to Nowhere is a 1947 American short documentary film produced by Frederic Ullman Jr. as part of RKO Pictures' documentary series This Is America. Its subject was European refugees after World War II. It was nominated for an Academy Award for Best Documentary Short. The star of the film is Dwight Weist, who was the narrator.
