= Laura Z. Hobson =

American novelist (1900–1986)

Laura Zametkin Hobson
- Born: Laura Kean Zametkin; June 19, 1900; Manhattan, New York City, U.S.
- Died: February 28, 1986 (aged 85); Manhattan, New York City, U.S.
- Other names: Laura Mount
- Occupation: Novelist
- Known for: Gentleman's Agreement; Consenting Adult
- Spouse: Thayer Hobson (m. 1930; div. 1935)
- Children: Michael Z. Hobson
- Parent(s): Michael Zametkin; Adella Kean

Laura Zametkin Hobson (June 19, 1900 – February 28, 1986) was an American writer, best known for her novels Gentleman's Agreement (1947) and Consenting Adult (1975).

== Early life and career ==
Laura Kean Zametkin was born on June 19, 1900 (Note: Some sources give Hobson's birthdate as June 18, others give June 19; Mrs. Hobson herself contributed to the confusion. Her twin sister, Alice, was born just before midnight on June 18, with Laura following on June 19, which was the date entered on both birth certificates. For years Hobson used June 18 and 19 interchangeably, "until [she] finally decided that, mnemonically, 19 went with 1900 and stuck to 19 ever since." (Hobson, Laura Z. Laura Z: The Early Years and Years of Fulfillment. New York: Primus/Donald I. Fine, 1987, p. 18.)) in Manhattan, New York City. Raised in Jamaica, Queens, she was the twin daughter of Russian Jewish immigrants Mikhail (Michael) Zametkin (c. 1861–1935) and Adella Kean Zametkin (c. 1863–1931), both of whom were Socialists. Michael Zametkin was a labor organizer as well as co-founder (and first editor) of The Jewish Daily Forward; Adella Zametkin was a columnist for the Yiddish newspaper Der Tog (The Day). (Note: Adella Kean Zametkin was a "liberated woman," long before the phrase was coined. She immigrated to the United States in 1888, where she met and married Michael Zametkin. In addition to her writing, she lectured, attended dental school, taught English to immigrant women, and raised three children, as well as a stepson. In 1921, when Hobson graduated from Cornell, Mrs. Zametkin traveled 300 miles to the commencement in the sidecar of her son Fred's motorcycle. (Mary McCune. The Whole Wide World, Without Limits: International Relief, Gender Politics, and American Jewish Women, 1893-1930. Detroit: Wayne State University Press, 2005, pp. 165-166.))

After graduating from Cornell University in 1921, Laura Zametkin held various jobs, including stints as an advertising copywriter and as a reporter for the New York Post. In 1934, she joined the promotional staff of Luce Publications (Time, Life, and Fortune), eventually becoming the first female director of promotion for Time. Hobson was, in fact, the first woman hired at Time in a non-secretarial capacity.

In 1932, Hobson's fiction appeared in print for the first time, when The New Yorker published "The Perfect Man" ("a sketch more than a story") under the by-line "Laura Mount." (Note: For a time, beginning in the 1920s, Hobson was known as Laura Mount, "Mount" being the surname of a man with whom she lived.) Three years later, she sold her first full-length story, "Hands Down," to Collier's. She signed the story (published as "Play Something Simple") with a new by-line, Laura Z. Hobson. It was the beginning of a prolific career: over the next fifty years, Hobson would publish hundreds of stories and articles. (Note: Two of her memorable articles were "As I Listened to Archie Say 'Hebe'...," (1971) which was a critical look at the new television series All in the Family; and "1,200 Miles by Bike in Central Park" (1967), which described her newly-found pleasure in bicycling in her mid-sixties. Both were published by The New York Times.)

After 1940, Hobson devoted herself to writing. In 1941, she was offered $5,000.00 to write a novel; the offer came from Richard L. Simon of the Simon & Schuster publishing house. Although she had never considered writing a novel, she eventually accepted the offer. The resulting book, The Trespassers, was the story of European refugees who are turned away from the United States during World War II, and was inspired by Hobson's own ultimately successful efforts during the war to obtain visas for a prominent European family. The book was published in 1943; reviews were mixed, but it was a modest best seller. (Note: Numerous sources claim that The Trespassers sold poorly. In fact, the book sold just under 20,000 copies, which--in 1943--was respectable, certainly for a first novel. (Hobson, Laura Z, p. 323.))

== Gentleman's Agreement and international success ==
After being serialized in Cosmopolitan, (Note: There was a time when Cosmopolitan was a literary magazine: as Hobson herself wrote in 1983, "[Cosmopolitan], in the middle forties, was nothing like the sex-saturated [Cosmo] of today. It ran a great deal of fiction by Somerset Maugham, Louis Bromfield, Edna Ferber, Paul Gallico, [and] Pearl Buck...." (Hobson, Laura Z, p. 387).) Hobson's second novel, Gentleman's Agreement, was published by Simon & Schuster on February 27, 1947. This is the story of a magazine writer who decides to research antisemitism by posing as a Jew. The novel was a worldwide success, translated into thirteen languages. On April 27, 1947, it reached number one on the New York Times best seller list, where it would remain for fourteen weeks. (According to Publishers Weekly, it was the third-best selling novel of 1947 at some two million copies.) The Jewish Book Council named Gentleman's Agreement the best Jewish novel of the year, but Hobson declined the award, (Note: Hobson declined the award she felt that "the book was an American novel, not a Jewish one." (Jewish Women's Archive. "Laura Z. Hobson." Accessed on December 23, 2016. <https://jwa.org/people/hobson-laura>.) which she later regretted.

The genesis of the novel was an article Hobson had read in the February 14, 1944 issue of Time magazine, which reported that John E. Rankin, a Democratic congressman from Mississippi, while addressing the House of Representatives, had referred to newspaper columnist Walter Winchell as "the little kike." According to Time, Rankin was not condemned by his colleagues, but was enthusiastically applauded at the end of his speech. Hobson was shocked, not only by Rankin's remark, but by the response of the House as well. She began to wonder: "How antisemitic was this country, this America, these United States? Not just among the outright bigots like Congressman Rankin... but [among] other people, people who'd never call anybody a kike, people who said they loathed prejudice?"

The film adaptation of Gentleman's Agreement was released on November 11, 1947. Directed by Elia Kazan for 20th Century Fox, from a screenplay by Moss Hart, the movie starred Gregory Peck, Dorothy McGuire, John Garfield, and a young Dean Stockwell. It was nominated for eight Academy Awards, and won three, including Best Motion Picture of 1947. The movie was also a huge success commercially, grossing $7.8 million, making it the eighth most popular film of 1948.

== Subsequent career ==
Hobson's third novel, The Other Father, the story of a father-daughter relationship, was published in 1950, and was followed by The Celebrity, a satire of literary fame, in 1951. Both books were "experiments", and moderate best sellers, but Hobson herself came to see them as something less than "major" works. Despite Hobson's feelings, both novels were cited by The New York Times as one of the "outstanding books" of their respective years.

After beginning her fifth novel, which was to be a fictionalized account of her "radical childhood," Hobson became "blocked." Putting the manuscript aside, she returned to her career in promotion. In 1953, she began writing a daily newspaper column for the International News Service, entitled "Assignment America." During this decade she also began to edit the double-crostic word puzzles for the Saturday Review, and would continue to do so for nearly thirty years. In 1959, she returned to her abandoned novel, which was finally published by Random House in 1964 as First Papers. Considered by many to be her finest novel, First Papers was widely praised.

The Tenth Month, the autobiographical story of a divorced woman of forty who discovers she is pregnant, was published in 1971, and filmed for television in 1979 with Carol Burnett. Hobson's next novel was the well-received Consenting Adult (1975), about parents who learn that their son is homosexual, based on her experience with her own son, Christopher; it was adapted for television in 1985 with Marlo Thomas and Martin Sheen. It was followed by the neglected Over and Above (1979), which explored concepts of Jewish identity in the story of three generations of women; and her final novel, Untold Millions (1982), the tale of a young advertising copywriter and the feckless man she loves.

Following publication of Untold Millions, Hobson wrote two acclaimed volumes of autobiography: Laura Z: A Life (1983), which concludes with the publication of Gentleman's Agreement in 1947; and the unfinished Laura Z: A Life, Years of Fulfillment, with an afterword by Christopher Z. Hobson, which appeared posthumously in 1986. In the books, Hobson discussed her books, her writing methods, and her friendships with Norman Cousins, Eric Hodgins, Sinclair Lewis, Henry and Clare Boothe Luce, Dorothy Thompson, and James Thurber.

As of December 2016, six of her nine novels are available in ebook editions from Open Road Media. Mrs. Hobson's papers are archived at Columbia University.

== Personal life ==
On July 23, 1930, Laura Zametkin married Thayer Hobson, who in 1931 became president of the William Morrow and Company publishing house. The Hobsons were divorced in 1935.

In 1937, Hobson adopted an infant son, whom she named Michael. Four years later, finding herself unexpectedly pregnant, she decided to have the baby in secrecy, unwilling to have Michael feel stigmatized as her only adopted child. (Note: Hobson later wrote, "[My doctor and I] never even discussed the secrecy aspect; we assumed it. Back in 1941 there was no such thing as being open and casual about a pregnancy out of wedlock.... [M]y own impulse was to shout it from the rooftops to all the world, but I knew I could never permit myself that luxury." (Hobson, Laura Z, p. 266.)) She went into seclusion, gave birth under an assumed name, and then adopted the baby publicly under her own name. This child was named Christopher. Only in their adulthood did Hobson tell her sons the actual circumstances of Christopher's birth.

In the late 1930s, Mrs. Hobson was engaged to Ralph Ingersoll, founder and publisher of the left-wing newspaper PM (1940–48), although Ingersoll later denied the engagement.

== Death ==
Hobson died of cancer at the New York Hospital in Manhattan, New York City on February 28, 1986. She was survived by her two sons and two grandchildren.

== Books ==
=== Novels ===
- The Trespassers (Simon & Schuster, 1943)
- Gentleman's Agreement (Simon & Schuster, 1947)
- The Other Father (Simon & Schuster, 1950)
- The Celebrity (Simon & Schuster, 1951)
- First Papers (Random House, 1964)
- The Tenth Month (Simon & Schuster, 1971)
- Consenting Adult (Doubleday, 1975)
- Over and Above (Doubleday, 1979)
- Untold Millions (Harper & Row, 1982)

=== Autobiographies ===
- Laura Z: A Life (Arbor House, 1983)
- Laura Z: A Life, Years of Fulfillment (Donald I. Fine, 1986)
- Laura Z: The Early Years and Years of Fulfillment (Primus/Donald I. Fine, 1987)

=== Juveniles ===
- A Dog of His Own (Viking, 1941)
- "I'm Going to Have a Baby!" (John Day, 1967)

=== Collaborations ===
- Outlaws Three (William Morrow, 1933) (as Peter Field)
- Dry Gulch Adams (William Morrow, 1934) (as Peter Field)

Note: Both books by "Peter Field" were Westerns, written in collaboration with then-husband Thayer Hobson and published by William Morrow. Mrs. Hobson was later embarrassed by the books, which, at Thayer Hobson's suggestion, had been written during the Depression in a successful attempt to earn extra money. (Hobson, Laura Z, pp. 125–27.)
