= National Board of Review Awards 1947 =

Annual US film awards ceremony

19th National Board of Review Awards

December 19, 1947

The 19th National Board of Review Awards were announced on December 19, 1947.

== Best English Language Films ==
1. Monsieur Verdoux
2. Great Expectations
3. Shoeshine
4. Crossfire
5. Boomerang!
6. Odd Man Out
7. Gentleman's Agreement
8. To Live in Peace
9. It's a Wonderful Life
10. The Overlanders

== Winners ==
- Best Film: Monsieur Verdoux
- Best Actor: Michael Redgrave (Mourning Becomes Electra)
- Best Actress: Celia Johnson (This Happy Breed)
- Best Director: Elia Kazan (Boomerang! and Gentleman's Agreement)
