= Gentleman's Agreement (novel) =

1947 novel by Laura Z. Hobson

- First edition
- Author: Laura Z. Hobson
- Language: English
- Subject: Antisemitism
- Publisher: Simon & Schuster
- Publication date: 1947
- Publication place: United States
- Pages: 275
- Preceded by: The Trespassers
- Followed by: The Other Father

Gentleman's Agreement is a 1947 novel by Laura Z. Hobson which explored the problem of antisemitism in the United States, what The New York Times called, in a contemporary review, "a story of the emotional disturbance that occurs within a man who elects, for the sake of getting a magazine article, to tell people that he is a Jew and who experiences first-hand, as a consequence, the shock and pain of discriminations and social snubs."

The novel, originally published in serial form in Cosmopolitan in 1946, was published by Simon & Schuster, and became a runaway bestseller, selling over 1.6 million copies. It reached No. 1 on The New York Times Best Seller list in April 1947. The book was adapted into a 1947 film of the same name starring Gregory Peck.

The novel tells the story of Philip Green, new staff writer for a national magazine. A gentile, he is assigned by his magazine to tell the story of antisemitism. He decides to do that by telling people that he is Jewish. This ruse causes problems with his fiancée, who is a social climbing suburbanite and divorcée. Green's son is victimized by antisemitism as well, adding to the tension.

The book received rave reviews, with The New York Times Book Review calling it "required reading for every thoughtful citizen in this perilous century". The Philadelphia Inquirer said it "bids fair to being one of the most astonishing novels of the year", and it was republished as an Armed Services Edition later in 1947.
