= Eleazar Lipsky =

American dramatist (1911–1993)

- Born: September 6, 1911
- Died: February 14, 1993 (aged 81)
- Occupations: prosecutor, lawyer, novelist, playwright

Eleazar Lipsky (September 6, 1911 – February 14, 1993) was a prosecutor, lawyer, novelist and playwright born in the Bronx, New York, United States. He wrote the novels that formed the basis of two very successful films, Kiss of Death (based on a 100-page manuscript) and The People Against O'Hara (based on his detective novel). Other novels include Lincoln McKeever (1953), The Devil's Daughter (Meredith Press, 1969, based on the legal troubles of William Sharon) and The Scientists (1959), a Book-of-the-Month Club selection.

Lipsky, who practiced law until three weeks before his death, was an assistant district attorney for Manhattan in the 1940s and later had a diversified law practice in Manhattan and served as legal counsel to the Mystery Writers of America. Lipsky was active in many Jewish organizations. In the 1960s, he was the president of the Jewish Telegraphic Agency.
