= Ian Dalrymple =

South African born British screenwriter, director and producer (1903–1989)

- Born: 26 August 1903; Johannesburg, South Africa
- Died: 28 March 1989 (aged 85); London, England
- Occupations: Screenwriter; director; editor; producer
- Relatives: Jamie Dalrymple (grandson); Simon Dalrymple (grandson)

Ian Dalrymple (26 August 1903 – 28 March 1989) was a British screenwriter, film director, film editor and film producer.

== Early life ==
Born in Johannesburg, South Africa, he was educated at Rugby and Trinity College, Cambridge.

== Career ==
He worked in advertising then went into the film industry.

=== Editor ===
Initially, he worked as an editor at Gainsborough Pictures working his way up to head editor. He then went to become head editor at Gaumont-British pictures from Rome Express onwards.

=== Screenwriter ===
He went into screenwriting with great success. He won an Oscar for his contribution to the script of Pygmalion.

Dalrymple went to work on Alexander Korda's propaganda film The Lion Has Wings (1939). One of its directors, Michael Powell, called Dalrymple "an extremely able and very nice man and a wonderful organiser."

=== Crown Film Unit ===
During World War II, from 1940 to 1943 he was a producer for the Crown Film Unit, the government run agency for information and propaganda films, in particular working, and forming a close friendship, with Humphrey Jennings.

Dalrymple said in 1941 their goal was:

We say in film to our own people 'This is what the boys in the services, or the girls in the factories, or the men and women in Civil Defence, or the patient citizens themselves are like, and what they are doing. They are playing their part in the spirit in which you see them in this film. Be of good heart and go and do likewise'. And we say to the world, 'Here in these films are the British people at war' ... It has seen the truth and it can make up its own mind.

=== Korda ===
In 1943 Dalrymple went to work for Alex Korda as production supervisor.

=== Wessex ===
In 1946 Dalrymple formed his own production company, Wessex Productions, based at Pinewood Studios. Among his employees were Pat Jackson and Jack Lee, who worked with him at the Crown Film Unit. The company signed an agreement with Rank, and made The Woman in the Hall (1947), written and produced by Dalrymple and directed by Lee. It was followed by Esther Waters (1948), which Dalrymple directed alongside Peter Proud, and is remembered today for introducing Dirk Bogarde. Bogarde starred in two other Wessex films, Once a Jolly Swagman (1949), directed by Lee, and Dear Mr. Prohack (1949) directed by Thornton Freeland. They also made All Over the Town (1949), directed by Derek Twist.

None of the films had been particularly successful at the box office. In 1949 Wessex moved from Rank to Korda's London Films, who distributed through British Lion Films. The change had instant results: Wessex's first film in association with London, The Wooden Horse (1950), directed by Lee, was a big hit. It also made a star of Anthony Steel.

Dalrymple returned to documentary filmmaking with Jennings with Family Portrait (1950) and The Changing Face of Europe (1951) but Jennings then died in an accident. He had a critical success with The Heart of the Matter (1953) starring Trevor Howard. It was followed by Three Cases of Murder (1955), a horror anthology, and Raising a Riot (1955), a Kenneth More comedy directed by Wendy Toye which was a big success.

Wessex made a film about the Korean War, A Hill in Korea (1956), best remembered today for giving early roles to actors such as Robert Shaw, Stanley Baker and Michael Caine.

In the late 1960s he was film adviser to Decca and supervisor of film projects at Argo.

== Personal life ==
In the 1940s he lived at 'The Manor' at Bourton-on-the-Water in the Cotswolds. On Saturday 7 August 1948 his daughter Janet married Flying Officer Michael John Eldon Swiney (19 August 1926 - 30 September 2016), later Station Commander from 28 January 1972 until 12 October 1973 of RAF Leuchars. Janet died in 2011. Flight Lieutenant Michael Swiney, with Lieutenant David Crofts, took part in the 1952 Little Rissington UFO incident.

He died in London on 28 March 1989.

== Selected filmography ==
- The First Born (1928) – titles
- Balaclava (1928) – editor
- The Crooked Billet (1929) – editor
- Taxi for Two (1929) – co-writer, editor
- Symphony in Two Flats (1930) – editor
- The Ringer (1931) aka The Gaunt Stranger – editor
- Third Time Lucky (1931) – editor
- The Man They Couldn't Arrest (1931) – editor
- The Ghost Train (1931) – editor
- Michael and Mary (1931) – editor
- The Office Girl (1931) aka Sunshine Susie – editor
- The Hound of the Baskervilles (1932) – editor
- Lord Babs (1932) – editor
- Night and Day (1932) aka Jack's the Boy – editor
- Love on Wheels (1932) – editor
- There Goes the Bride (1932) – editor
- Rome Express (1932) – editor (uncredited)
- The Faithful Heart (1932) aka Faithful Hearts – editor
- Marry Me (1932) – editor
- Midshipmaid Gob (1932) aka The Midshipmaid – editor
- After the Ball (1932) – editor
- The Lucky Number (1932) – production personnel
- The Ghoul (1933) – editor
- A Cuckoo in the Nest (1933) – as producer, production personnel
- Soldiers of the King (1933) aka The Woman in Command – as editor
- The Good Companions (1933) – as co-writer, production personnel
- It's a Boy (1933) – production personnel, assistant producer
- Falling for You (1933) – production personnel
- I Was a Spy (1933) – production personnel, assistant producer
- Leave It to Smith (1933) – production personnel
- Channel Crossing (1933) – production personnel, producer
- Friday the Thirteenth (1933) – production personnel
- Britannia of Billingsgate (1933) – production personnel
- Orders Is Orders (1934) – production personnel
- Jack Ahoy (1934) – editor
- Evergreen (1934) – editor
- Little Friend (1934) – editor
- The Iron Duke (1934) – editor
- Jury's Evidence (1935) – as co-writer
- Turn of the Tide (1935) – as editor
- Her Last Affaire (1935) – editor, writer
- Jury's Evidence (1936) – writer
- The Brown Wallet (1936) – writer
- Radio Lover (1936) – writer
- Action for Slander (1937) – additional dialogue
- Storm in a Teacup (1937) – as writer, director
- Action for Slander (1937) – as co-writer
- South Riding (1938) – as co-writer
- Pygmalion (1938) – as co-writer (uncredited)
- The Citadel (1938) – as co-writer
- The Divorce of Lady X (1938) – as co-writer
- Q Planes (1939) aka Clouds Over Europe – as co-writer
- Clouds Over Europe (1939) – writer
- Cheer Boys Cheer (1939) as co-writer
- French Without Tears (1939) – as co-writer
- The Fugitive (1939) aka On the Night of the Fire – associate producer
- The Lion Has Wings (1939) – story, assoc producer
- A Window in London (1940) aka Lady in Distress – as co-writer
- London Can Take It! (1940) (documentary short)
- Sea Fort (1940) (documentary) – director, writer
- Old Bill & Son (1941) – as co-writer and director
- Pimpernel Smith (1941) – as co-writer
- The Heart of Britain (1941) (documentary short) – as producer
- Target for Tonight (1941) (documentary) – as producer
- Words for Battle (1941) (documentary short) – as producer
- Ferry Pilot (1941) (documentary short) – as producer
- Listen to Britain (1942) (documentary short) – as producer
- Coastal Command (1942) (documentary) – as producer
- Builders (1942) (documentary short) – as producer
- Wavell's 30,000 (1942) (documentary short) – as producer
- Malta G.C. (1942) (documentary short) – as producer
- Fires Were Started (1943) (documentary) – as producer
- Undersea Raider (1943) (documentary short) – as producer
- We Sail at Midnight (1943) (documentary short) – as producer
- Before the Raid (1944) (documentary short) – as producer
- Western Approaches (1944) aka The Raider (documentary short) – as producer
- The Woman in the Hall (1947) – as producer and co-writer
- Esther Waters (1947) – as producer and director
- Once a Jolly Swagman (1948) aka Maniacs on Wheels – as producer
- Dear Mr. Prohack (1949) – as producer and co-writer
- All Over the Town (1949) – as producer
- Family Portrait (1950) (documentary short) – as producer – directed by Jennings
- The Wooden Horse (1950) – as producer and uncredited director
- The Changing Face of Europe (1951) (documentary) – executive producer
- Royal Heritage (1952) (documentary short) – producer
- The Heart of the Matter (1953) – as producer and co-writer
- Three Cases of Murder (1954) – as producer and co-writer
- Raising a Riot (1955) – as producer and co-writer
- A Hill in Korea (1956) – co-writer, executive producer
- The Admirable Crichton (1957) aka Paradise Lagoon – as producer
- A Cry from the Streets (1958) – as Producer
- Hunted in Holland (1961) – writer, producer
- Mix Me a Person (1962) – as co-writer, executive producer
- Calamity the Cow (1967) – producer
- Chaucer's Tale (1971) (documentary short) – producer

== Sources ==
- Halliwell's Who's Who in the Movies – published by Harper-Collins ISBN 0-06-093507-3
- Chronicle of the Cinema published by D & K – ISBN 0-7894-2249-2
