= The Silent Village =

- Screenshot from the film
- Directed by: Humphrey Jennings
- Produced by: David Vaughan
- Cinematography: H.E. Fowle
- Edited by: Stewart McAllister
- Music by: Becket Williams
- Distributed by: Crown Film Unit
- Release date: 1943
- Running time: 36 min.
- Country: United Kingdom
- Languages: English, Welsh

The Silent Village is a 1943 British propaganda short film in the form of a drama documentary, made by the Crown Film Unit and directed by Humphrey Jennings. The film was named one of the top 5 documentaries of 1943 by the National Board of Review. It was inspired by the Lidice massacre in occupied Czechoslovakia in June 1942.

== Plot ==
The film opens with a title card outlining the story of Lidice.

It then moves on to an image of the stream running through the village of Cwmgiedd (half a mile from Ystradgynlais in west Wales), and an eight-minute opening sequence interspersed with images and sounds of everyday life in a community in the Upper Swansea Valley; men are shown working at the colliery, women engaged in domestic tasks in their homes and the inhabitants singing in the Methodist chapel. Most of the dialogue in this section is spoken in Welsh, with no subtitles. The section closes with another title card stating "such is life at Cwmgiedd...and such too was life in Lidice until the coming of Fascism".

The German occupation is heralded by the arrival in the village of a black car, blaring military music and political slogans from its loudhailer. Little is shown of the occupation itself, its violence being implied by a soundtrack of marching boots, gunfire and harshly amplified orders and directives, in the sound-as-narrative technique Jennings had previously developed in Listen to Britain. The identity of the community is eroded, with the Welsh language being suppressed and no longer permitted as the teaching medium in the school, and trade union activity being made illegal. The villagers resistance takes the form of covert activities including the publication of a Welsh news sheet. Eventually, even the singing of Welsh hymns in the chapel is outlawed.

The catalyst for the systematic obliteration of Cwmgiedd in a reprisal is intended to parallel the consequence of the actual murder of the leading Nazi Reinhard Heydrich the previous year. The children of the village are marched out of school and join the womenfolk as they are loaded onto trucks. The men, defiantly singing "Land of Our Fathers" as they go, are lined up against the wall of the village churchyard.

== Cast ==
- Villagers of Cwmgiedd as Themselves
- Arwel Michael as Self

== Background ==
The murder of Reinhard Heydrich, whose assassination (Operation Anthropoid) by British-trained Czech agents in Prague led to the actual Lidice massacre. The film was designed as a tribute to the mining community of Lidice, Czechoslovakia, which had been the scene of the appalling Nazi atrocity on 10 June 1942 when its entire adult male population (173 men and boys over 16) was executed and all 300 women and children sent to Nazi concentration camps, which few would ultimately survive. News of the massacre caused much shock in the UK, particularly in the coal-mining areas of the country. The film recreates events in Lidice but transports them to a South Wales mining community to indicate that if the German invasion of Britain had been successful in 1940, then the kind of atrocities currently being perpetrated in German-occupied Europe would just as likely be happening contemporaneously in the UK; also as a reminder to the British people of what they were fighting against.

== Production ==
By August 1942, Jennings was scouting for a filming location in a mining community with both a physical resemblance to Lidice, and a similar social/political history. According to one of the film's actors, Jennings asked the advice of Welsh miners' leader and South Wales Miners' Federation president Arthur Horner as to a suitable location. Horner advised avoiding the coal mining valleys of the Rhondda, and instead investigate the more rural anthracite area of west Wales. Jennings' travels brought him to the town of Ystradgynlais in Brecknockshire, and in particular its self-contained community of Cwmgiedd. Jennings discussed the project with the local mine workers and their families, and found them enthusiastic for the venture. He also gained the co-operation of Arthur Horner, who felt that the proposed film would be symbolic of the unity and solidarity felt by all mining communities with the people of Lidice.

Filming began in September 1942 and continued through to December. Jennings had decided that no professional actors would be brought in, and his entire cast consisted of untrained local people, although he was careful to ensure that nobody appeared on screen without giving their permission and that anyone who felt uneasy or uncomfortable about being filmed was excluded from shots. People were filmed going about their actual daily lives in a largely improvised manner with no script having been prepared. In a letter to his wife, he wrote: "Down here I’m working on a reconstruction of the Lidice story in a mining community – but more important than that really is being close to the community itself and living and working inside it, for what it is everyday. I really never thought to live and see the honest Christian and Communist principles acted on as a matter of course by a large number of British – I won’t say English – people living together."

== Critical reception ==
On its release, the film gained a reputation as a particularly pertinent, powerful and moving short film. Contemporary opinion places it among the products of Jennings' most fruitful period as a director alongside Listen to Britain, Fires Were Started and A Diary for Timothy. Dave Berry of the British Film Institute notes: "There's a civilised reticence about Jennings' treatment...but overall (he) instinctively finds the right tone. A constant fear of reprisals permeates the film. In domestic scenes, the locals' impassivity, listening to their radios, compounds the sense of oppression. Stilted acting makes its own contribution. There are no glib, articulate spokesmen here and Jennings, using light and shadow well, suggests a stunned community awaiting the decisive blow." In a wider discussion of Welsh industry in film, BBC Wales said: "Jennings' penchant for understatement and striking imagery carried its own force – and the film, calling for solidarity among miners faced with the German threat to freedom, was instrumental in forging enduringly strong relationships between Czech and Welsh miners, in particular."

The Silent Village was on a list of eight films announced as Academy Award nominees for Documentary Feature, but the Documentary Award Committee subsequently narrowed the field to five titles and the film was not included on the final ballot.
