= Builders (film) =

1942 British film by Pat Jackson

- Directed by: Pat Jackson
- Produced by: Ian Dalrymple
- Cinematography: C.M. Pennington-Richards
- Production company: Crown Film Unit
- Release date: 1942
- Running time: 8 minutes
- Country: United Kingdom
- Language: English

Builders is a 1942 British short propaganda film directed by Pat Jackson and produced by Ian Dalrymple at the Crown Film Unit of the Ministry of Information. It outlines the importance of the work of builders during the Second World War.

The eight-minute film is structured as a dialogue between the builders and an off-screen narrator, a technique developed in the 1935 British social documentary film Housing Problems.

It was one of many films produced to improve civilian morale.

== Cast ==
- John Hilton as narrator

== Home media ==
The film is included on the BFI DVD Land of Promise: The British Documentary Movement 1930-1950.
