= Men of the Lightship =

1940 British wartime propaganda film directed by David MacDonald

- Opening titles
- Directed by: David MacDonald
- Written by: David Evans; Hugh Gray; Alan Hodge
- Produced by: Alberto Cavalcanti
- Cinematography: Frank "Jonah" Jones
- Edited by: Stewart McAllister; Alfred Hitchcock (uncredited)
- Music by: Richard Addinsell
- Production company: Crown Film Unit
- Release date: 1940
- Running time: 24 min, 4 seconds
- Country: United Kingdom
- Language: English

Men of the Lightship is a short propaganda film produced by the Crown Film Unit for the British Ministry of Information in 1940, the year after the beginning of the Second World War. It dramatises the bombing of the East Dudgeon lightship by the Luftwaffe on 29 January 1940 and was designed to portray Germany as a barbaric enemy. An opening narration explains the traditional understanding of lightships (stationary ships used as lighthouses) as neutral vessels during war.

The filmmakers attempted to recreate the original incident as realistically as possible; the crew of the lightship is composed of real lightship men rather than professional actors. The realism of the film was praised in press reviews upon its release, and it was considered one of the best British propaganda films of the period. Men of the Lightship was also distributed in America in 1941, in an edited version produced under the supervision of Alfred Hitchcock.

== Plot ==
In 1940, the East Dudgeon lightship's seven-man crew are waiting for the arrival of another crew to relieve them of their duties so they can return home. While they are waiting, a momentary danger is encountered and dealt with: a drifting mine comes perilously close to the ship and the crew call for a minesweeper to destroy it.

Later, while the crew are gathered on deck, two Luftwaffe aircraft fly overhead. To the men's surprise, the aircraft begin firing at them with machine guns, wounding the captain in the arm. As the attack intensifies, and the aircraft begin to drop bombs, the entire crew manage to escape the vessel on a lifeboat. The efforts of the German bombers eventually result in the lightship sinking.

The escaped crew row during the night in an attempt to reach the shore. Before they can land the boat, the lifeboat capsizes and overcome by tiredness, the men drown. A new lightship is then stationed in place of the sunken vessel.

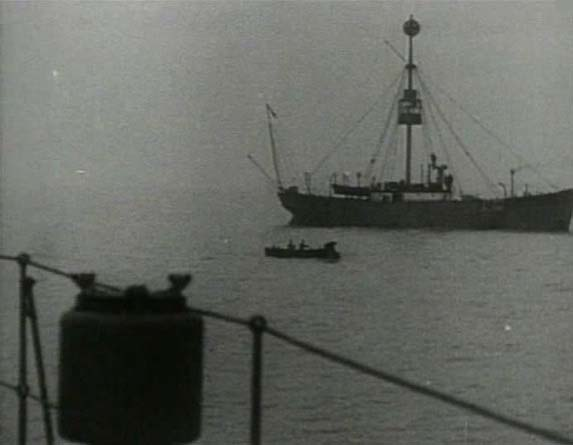
Screenshot of the lightship

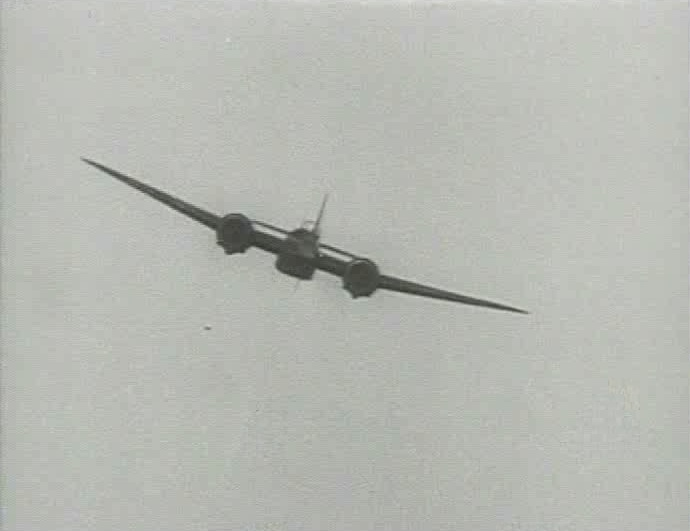
Screenshot of the attack on the lightship

== Cast ==
The filmmakers cast real lightship men rather than professional actors. The only identified actor is Bill Blewitt, a fisherman who appeared, as himself, in four documentary films, notably The Saving of Bill Blewitt (1937), as well as appearing as an actor in four other productions between 1942 and 1945.

Not all the crewmen died as shown in the film. John Sanders of Great Yarmouth was the sole survivor.

== Production ==
Men of the Lightship was based on a real incident that happened to the East Dudgeon lightship on 29 January 1940. The Ministry of Information decided to use this event for propaganda purposes, to portray Germany as a barbaric enemy and thus encourage support of the war effort against them. The film ends with the narrator concluding: "The Nazis must be stopped. We must, we can, we will stop them." Central to this propaganda aim of the film is the idea that the German aircraft are violating the traditional wartime convention that lightships should be protected as neutral, as they are undefended ships that serve all vessels regardless of the nationality of their crew. Another propaganda theme supported by Men of the Lightship is that of sacrifices for the war effort being made by ordinary working class citizens. To support this end, the characters in the film are developed to show their everyday concerns and activities, including the upcoming wedding of one crew member, and the pet tortoise owned by another.

During production, the makers of the film sought to recreate the original event as completely as possible, and the credits note the director David MacDonald "reconstructed" the film (rather than "directed"). As with other documentary films produced by the Crown Film Unit during the war, this desire for realism led to the use of "real people" in place of professional actors. When the film was originally shot, professional actors had been used for the roles of the lightship's crew, but producer Alberto Cavalcanti contacted David MacDonald during the film's production, asking him to re-shoot the sections containing professional actors because he thought they were "totally unconvincing", in contrast with the "splendid" performances of the amateurs. These scenes were then re-filmed with real lightship men.

An alternative ending, not consistent with the course of the original incident, was proposed by RAF officials. The suggestion was that additional propaganda value could be added to the film's narrative if the German aircraft were shot down by RAF aircraft. This idea was rejected by the filmmakers, although the RAF still assisted with the reconstruction of the attack, lending two Bristol Blenheim bombers.

== Reception ==
Men of the Lightship was highly praised by both the trade and general press. A reviewer in the Daily Express stated that it was "the best British documentary film I have yet seen". In the trade magazine Cinema, a reviewer considered that it had cinematic merit outside of its propaganda value, commenting on the "grim realism" of the work and concluding that the film was an "absolutely first-class job of work" and a "credit to everyone concerned in its production". The film's realism was also mentioned in a review in The Times, which stated that "the employment, not of professional actors but of men who might well have had such an experience ... turns out to be inexplicably a better means of attaining reality than any skilled imitation." This reviewer also considered the attack to be "astonishingly vivid". Writing in anticipation of the film's distribution in Australia, Betty Wilson in The Sydney Morning Herald described it as "the best propaganda film England has put out this war", "worth half a dozen films of the calibre of The Lion Has Wings".

When the film was released in Australia in early 1941, it was met with a positive reception. In The Sydney Morning Herald, it was described as a "tensely thrilling and moving document". The Australian Women's Weekly praised the film's realism, stating: "It is difficult to believe you are not watching the real lightship and its crew, so natural is the acting of the cast, so vivid the action scenes."

The high praise received for the film meant that some cinemas in the United Kingdom listed it as the main feature. In a survey of propaganda shorts conducted by Mass-Observation in July 1941, Men of the Lightship was one of the best rated titles, receiving only positive responses.

== U.S. release ==
As with many other British propaganda films, Men of the Lightship was distributed in the United States. It was released in an edited version under the title Men of Lightship 61. Twentieth-Century Fox and RKO had been approached as possible distributors for the film in the U.S., but had both declined, suggesting that the film in its current state was unsuitable for an American audience. Alfred Hitchcock was subsequently approached to explore the possibility of adapting the narration, using an American narrator. As well as supervising the editing process, Hitchcock funded the project at a cost of $4,428. Robert Emmet Sherwood, who co-wrote the screenplay for the 1940 Hitchcock film Rebecca, was chosen to edit the script for the narration, which was spoken by actor Robert Montgomery. The modified version of the film was distributed by Twentieth-Century Fox in 1941. Hitchcock also later oversaw the editing of the film Target for Tonight. On both occasions, he was uncredited.

== DVD release ==
Men of the Lightship is included on Volume 3 of the BFI GPO Film Unit Collection, If War Should Come. The collection of 18 films cover the period 1939–1941.
