= Spare Time =

1939 British film

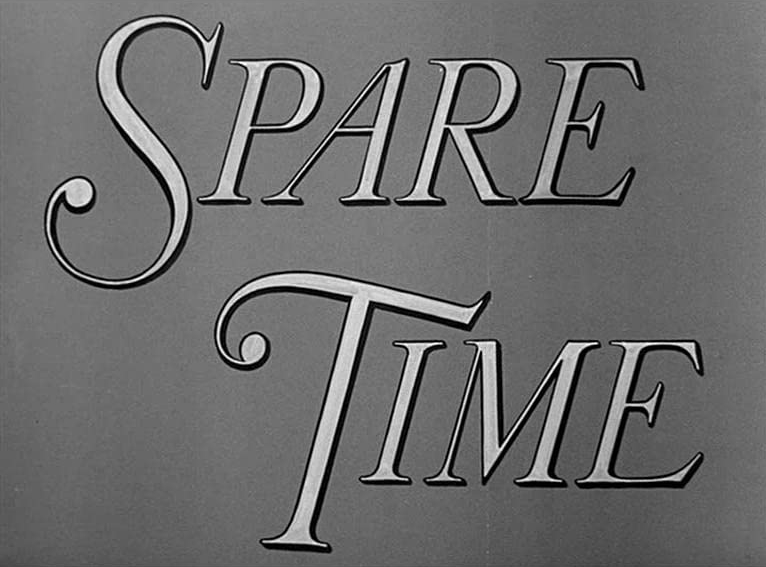
- Directed by: Humphrey Jennings
- Produced by: Alberto Cavalcanti
- Narrated by: Laurie Lee
- Cinematography: H.E. Fowle
- Production company: GPO Film Unit
- Release date: 1939
- Running time: 15 minutes
- Country: United Kingdom
- Language: English

Spare Time is a 1939 British film directed by Humphrey Jennings for the GPO Film Unit, and made for the 1939 New York World's Fair. It is 15 minutes long and documents the leisure activities of workers in the coal, steel, and cotton industries in Sheffield, Bolton, Manchester and Pontypridd. Commentary is provided by Laurie Lee.

Time Out calls it "A touching, troubling encapsulation of 1930s Britain." Spare Time was the subject of one of a set of ten postage stamps produced by the Royal Mail in 2015 to commemorate British cinema classics, including four from the GPO Film Unit.

== Production ==
Spare Time is a 1939 British film directed by Humphrey Jennings for the GPO Film Unit, and made for the 1939 New York World's Fair, to show how the working class in Britain spent their leisure time in the 1930s. It runs for a duration of 15 minutes.

== Synopsis ==
It documents the leisure activities of workers in the coal, steel and cotton industries in Sheffield, Bolton, Manchester and Pontypridd. It depicts in short clips activities like wrestling, ballroom dancing, card games and pigeon fanciers. Strung together in startling combinations to the sounds of brass bands, choirs, and jazz. Commentary is provided by Laurie Lee.

== Reception ==
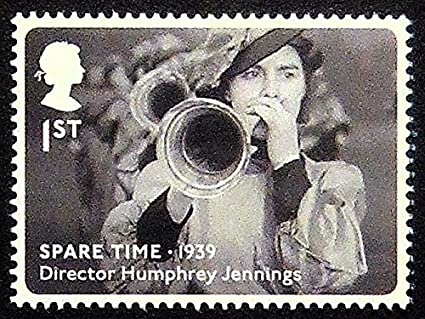
2014 Royal Mail stamp showing a still from Spare Time

Paul Swann has described Spare Time as an "early example of Jennings's aural and visual poetry on film" that showed the direction in which his film-making would go after the Second World War. The film does not analyse social or economic problems, and is almost free of narrative commentary. Basil Wright felt that the film portrayed a "patronising, sometimes almost sneering attitude towards the efforts of low-income groups". The art historian David Mellor felt that Spare Time was the work most emblematic of a 'pop iconography' until the 1950s work of Tom Phillips and the Independent Group.

Time Out has called the film "A touching, troubling encapsulation of 1930s Britain." Scott Anthony, in a profile of the film for the British Film Institute's Screenonline describes Spare Time as "an incredible portrait of the prewar working class and an early illustration of Humphrey Jennings' genius". Anthony felt the film possessed a "a similar cinematic catalogue" to Jennings's book Pandaemonium and that the film was "an obvious extension" of Jennings's work with the British amateur anthropological Mass-Observation organisation.

In 2015, Spare Time was the subject of one of a set of ten postage stamps produced by Royal Mail to commemorate British cinema classics, including four from the GPO Film Unit.
