= William Sansom =

British novelist, travel and short-story writer (1912–1976)

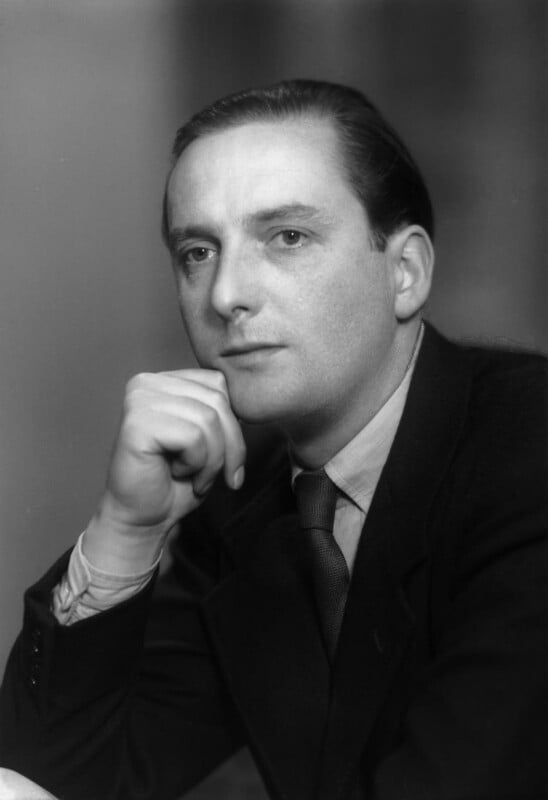
- Sansom in 1946
- Born: Norman Trevor Sansom; 18 January 1912; London, England
- Died: 20 April 1976 (aged 64); London, England
- Occupations: Novelist; travel writer; short-story writer

William Norman Trevor Sansom FRSL (born Norman Trevor Sansom; 18 January 1912 – 20 April 1976) was a British novelist, travel and short-story writer known for his highly descriptive prose style.

== Profile ==
Sansom was born in London, England, the third son of Ernest Brooks Sansom, MINA, a naval architect, by his wife Mabel (née Clark). He was educated at Uppingham School, Rutland, before moving to Bonn to learn German. Named Norman Trevor Sansom at birth, he was called "William" as a child and used this name throughout his life.

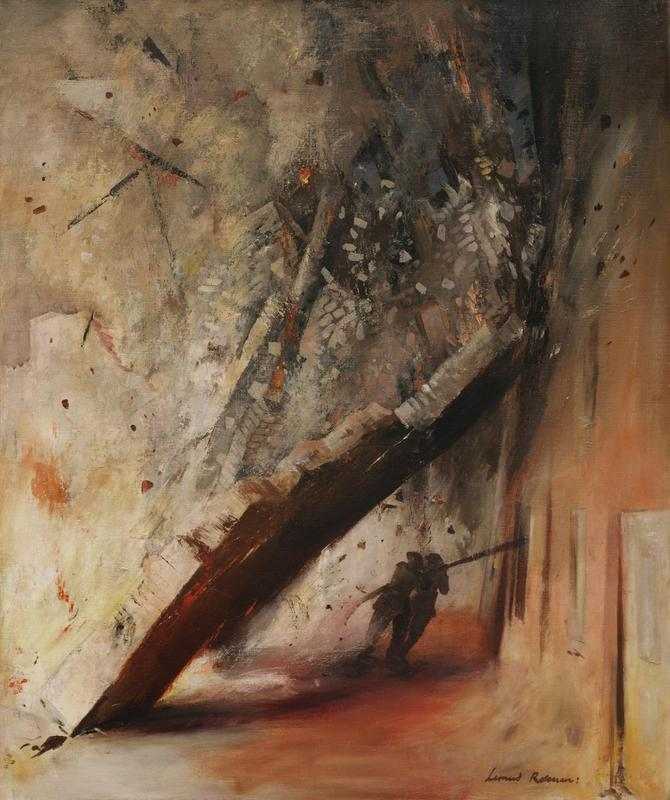
A House Collapsing on Two Firemen, Shoe Lane, London, EC4

From 1930, Sansom worked in international banking for the British chapter of a German bank, and in 1935 he moved to an advertising company (J. Walter Thompson) where he worked until the outbreak of World War II. Then he became a full-time London firefighter, serving throughout The Blitz. His experiences during that time inspired much of his writing, including many of the stories in the celebrated collection Fireman Flower. He also appeared in Humphrey Jennings's famous film about the Blitz, Fires Were Started, as the fireman who plays the piano. Sansom was involved in fighting the Second Great Fire of London in 1940, during which a wall collapsed and buried him and another firefighter, killing the latter; his friend and fellow firefighter Leonard Rosoman, RA, who was replaced by Sansom's colleague on the assignment, painted A House Collapsing on Two Firemen, Shoe Lane, London, EC4 to commemorate the incident.

After the war, Sansom became a full-time writer. In 1946 and 1947 he was awarded two literary prizes by the Society of Authors, and in 1951 was elected a Fellow of the Royal Society of Literature. In 1954, he married actress Ruth Grundy, daughter of Norman Grundy, FCA. They had one son, Nicholas. He also had a stepson, Sean, the son of Ruth Grundy's previous marriage to Grey Wilson Blake.

As well as exploring war-torn London, Sansom's writing deals with romance (The Face of Innocence), murder ("Various Temptations"), comedy ("A Last Word") and supernatural horror ("A Woman Seldom Found"). The latter, perhaps his most anthologized story, combines detailed description with narrative tension to unravel a young man's encounter with a bizarre creature in Rome.

Sansom died suddenly at St Mary's Hospital, London, from a serious illness.

== Selected works ==
=== Novels ===
- The Body (1949)
- The Face of Innocence (1951)
- The Last Hours of Sandra Lee (1961)
- The Guilt in Wandering (1963)
- Hans Feet in love (1971)
- Skimpy (1974)
- A Young Wife's Tale (1974)
- The Cautious Heart
- The Loving Eye (1956)
- A Bed of Roses
- Goodbye (1966), adapted as a Play for Today episode in 1975 by Hugh Whitemore and Gavin Millar.

=== Short novels ===
- Three
- The Equilibriad

=== Short story collections ===
- Fireman Flower (1944)
- South (1948)
- Something Terrible, Something Lovely (1948)
- The Passionate North (1950)
- A Touch of the Sun (1952)
- Lord Love Us (1954)
- A Contest of Ladies (1956)
- Among the Dahlias (1957)
- The Stories of William Sansom (1963)
- The Ulcerated Milkman (1966)
- The Marmalade Bird (1973)
- Various Temptations (2002)

=== Non-fiction ===
- Westminster at War (1947)
- Pleasures Strange and Simple (1953)
- The Icicle and the Sun (1958)
- Blue Skies, Brown Studies (1961)
- Away to It All (1964)
- Christmas (1968)
- Grand Tour Today (1968)
- The Birth of a Story (1972)
- Proust and His World (1973)

=== Children's literature ===
- It Was Really Charlie's Castle
- The Light that Went Out

=== As illustrator ===
- Who's Zoo by Michael Braude (1963) – light verse; humor and satire, OCLC 946501958; animals from A to Z in verse, OCLC 992646836

== Citations ==
In his classical work The Presentation of Self in Everyday Life, Erving Goffman used an extended paragraph of Sansom's A Contest of Ladies to develop his model of the social role and the dramaturgical approach to sociology.
