= Ferry Pilot =

Ferry pilot may refer to:

- a person engaged in Ferry flying
- Ferry Pilot (1941 film), a British documentary film from 1941
- Ferry Pilot (1942 film), a Canadian documentary film from 1942
