= Stewart McAllister =

- Born: 27 December 1914; Lanarkshire, Scotland
- Died: 27 November 1962 (aged 47); Carluke, Lanarkshire, Scotland
- Occupation: Documentary film-maker

Stewart McAllister (27 December 1914 – 27 November 1962) was a British documentary film editor who collaborated closely with Humphrey Jennings during the Second World War to produce films for the Crown Film Unit of the Ministry of Information. His contributions towards these films was largely neglected until Dai Vaughan's biography of him, Portrait of an Invisible Man, was published in 1983.

== Early life ==
McAllister was born in the Scottish county of Lanarkshire on 27 December 1914. While studying painting at the Glasgow School of Art, McAllister became involved in the Film Society.

== Career ==
During his time in the Film Society, one of McAllister's films brought him to the attention of documentary film-maker John Grierson. Grierson invited him to join the GPO Film Unit.

During the Second World War, McAllister continued working with this unit, which was renamed the Crown Film Unit in 1940. In this time, he worked as an editor for most of the films directed by Humphrey Jennings, including Fires Were Started and Listen to Britain. Other films he edited during the war include the Harry Watt film Target for Tonight.

Following the death of Humphrey Jennings in 1950, McAllister began working for the British Transport Films unit, under Edgar Anstey. With Anstey's encouragement, McAllister began working as a producer, resulting in films such as the humorous I Am a Litter Basket (1959). He also narrated many of the films that he produced.

== Death ==
McAllister died in the Law Hospital, Lanarkshire on 27 November 1962.

== Collaboration with Jennings ==
McAllister's role in the production of Crown Film Unit films has often been overlooked, with greater attention being focused on Jennings. However, the exact nature of McAllister's collaboration with Humphrey Jennings remains uncertain. McAllister's biographer, Dai Vaughan, provides substantial evidence through quotations from primary sources and critical analyses of the films, that McAllister's creativity and skills were a defining factor in what are known are known as 'Jenning's films', and that McAllister is an excellent case study for re-examining the validity of a theory of a single 'author' of a film. McAllister's contribution seems to have been particularly significant for the film Listen to Britain, which uniquely acknowledged that it was 'Directed and edited by Humphrey Jennings and Stewart McAllister'. The recycling of other footage necessitated a greater degree of creative editing. Some of the film's most memorable scenes, including the cut from Flanagan and Allen in a factory to Dame Myra Hess at the National Gallery, were attributed to McAllister by his colleagues.

== Personality ==
McAllister was shy and introverted but was also considered bad-tempered and argumentative.

== Filmography ==
=== As editor ===
- 7 Till 5 (1933)
- North Sea (1938)
- The Islanders (1939 - as assistant editor)
- Men of the Lightship (1940)
- London Can Take It! (1940)
- The Heart of Britain (1941)
- Words for Battle (1941)
- Target for Tonight (1941)
- Listen to Britain (1942)
- Fires Were Started (1943)
- The Silent Village (1943)
- The Eighty Days (1944)
- A Diary for Timothy (1945)
- Family Portrait (1950)
- Journey Into History (1951)
- Train Time (1952)
- Frontline: Memories of the Camps (1985)
- A Painful Reminder: Evidence for All Mankind (1985)

=== As producer ===
- The Heart is Highland (1952)
- Ocean Terminal (1952)
- The Coasts of Clyde (1959)
- I Am a Litter Basket (1959)
- Groundwork for Progress (1959)
- Railway Electrification at Industrial Frequency (1960)

=== As director ===
- Listen to Britain (1942)
- The Land of Robert Burns (1953)
