= Leonard Brockington =

Canadian lawyer and civil servant (1888–1966)

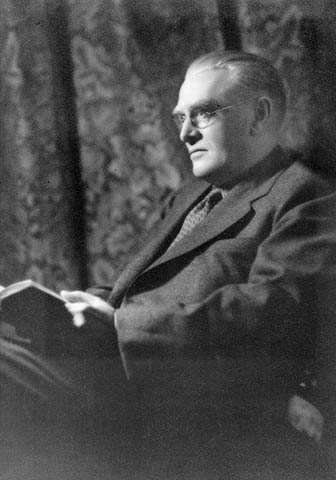
- Born: 6 April 1888; Cardiff, Wales
- Died: 15 September 1966 (aged 78); Toronto, Ontario, Canada
- Education: University of Wales; University of Alberta
- Occupations: lawyer, civil servant, administrator
- Known for: first head of the CBC

Leonard Walter Brockington CMG QC (6 April 1888 – 15 September 1966) was a Canadian lawyer, civil servant, public figure, and the first head of the Canadian Broadcasting Corporation (CBC).

== Biography ==
Born in Cardiff, Wales, one of seven children, Brockington was educated at the University of Wales, graduating with honours in Latin and Greek. He arrived in Canada in 1912. Settling in Edmonton, Brockington became a journalist and civil servant. He studied law at the University of Alberta and became a solicitor for the city of Calgary. He then joined the Calgary law firm of James Lougheed and R. B. Bennett.

He served as Chairman of the Board of Governors of the CBC from 1936 to 1939. He also served as:

- Special Assistant to Prime Minister Mackenzie King from 1939 to 1942
- Narrator of the introduction to Humphrey Jennings Listen to Britain
- Joined the law firm Gowling, MacTavish, Osborne and Henderson in 1942 as Counsel
- Adviser on Imperial Affairs to the British Ministry of Information from 1942 to 1943
- A member of the Canada Council
- Wrote an informative chapter on Baron Tweedsmuir [John Buchan] Governor General of Canada in "John Buchan by his Wife and Friends"
- Rector of Queen's University from 1947 to 1966

An annual Visitorship was established at Queen's in 1968, to honour the memory of Brockington, with the help of funding from the Samuel McLaughlin Foundation. The Visitorship brings "a person of international distinction" to come to Queen's to deliver a public lecture, and to meet formally and informally with faculty, students, and community members.

Queen's has also named Brockington House, a student residence, in his memory. In 1946, he was made a Companion of the Order of St Michael and St George.

Government offices
Preceded by Position Created	President of the Canadian Broadcasting Corporation; 1936–1939	Succeeded by René Morin
