= Ferry Pilot (1941 film) =

- Title card
- Directed by: Pat Jackson
- Produced by: Ian Dalrymple
- Production company: Crown Film Unit
- Distributed by: Associated British Film Distributors
- Release date: 1941
- Running time: 31 minutes
- Country: United Kingdom
- Language: English

Ferry Pilot is a British short documentary film produced in 1941 about the work of the Air Transport Auxiliary (ATA). Directed by Pat Jackson and produced by Ian Dalrymple the film was the work of the Crown Film Unit and was released at the end of 1941. Originally conceived as a very short five minute film, it was expanded to a running time of over 30 minutes during production.

== Synopsis ==
The film starts with the commander of one of ATA ferry pools and his assistant receiving telephone calls about aircraft to be moved between factories and airfields and working out pilot rosters. It moves on to introduce the variety of people, both men and women, who are pilots in the ATA. The movements of two pilots, an older Englishman and a young American as they are transported to a factory in an ATA Avro Anson to collect two Supermarine Spitfires for delivery to an RAF base somewhere in England. After delivering the Spitfires, the English pilot flies an Armstrong Whitworth Whitley to another airfield with the American pilot as a passenger. The two land, unaware that they came close to being attacked by German aircraft, and are picked up by another ATA crew to return to their base. The film ends with the two signing-off for the day with the ferry pool commander.

== Reception ==
The Times described the film as having "an attractively deceptive casualness about it", not indulging in heroics but paying "an admirable tribute to a service about which the public knows little." The Northern Whig called the film "a sound competent piece of film production" urging its readers to see the film, while Flight said "the film bears the stamp of authenticity one would expect in a production of the Crown Film Unit", ending the review "This little film was well worth making; it is also well worth seeing."
