= Words for Battle =

- Title frame
- Directed by: Humphrey Jennings
- Written by: Humphrey Jennings
- Produced by: Ian Dalrymple
- Narrated by: Laurence Olivier
- Edited by: Stewart McAllister
- Production company: Crown Film Unit
- Release date: 28 April 1941 (UK)
- Running time: 8 minutes
- Country: United Kingdom
- Language: English

Words for Battle (also known by its original title In England Now) is a British propaganda film produced by the Ministry of Information's Crown Film Unit in 1941. It was written and directed by Humphrey Jennings, and features seven sequences, each containing images of rural and urban Britain at war overlaid with audio commentary by Laurence Olivier, reciting passages from different English literary works and speeches.

== Synopsis ==
In 1941 England is an idyllic and bountiful place as depicted by Philemon Holland's translation of William Camden's Britannia. A recitation of part of John Milton's tract Areopagitica, accompanies images of Westminster Abbey, Royal Air Force recruits in flight training and Adolf Hitler speaking with Nazi officers. The words from William Blake's poem Jerusalem punctuates a scene of children being evacuated from London. Images of Royal Navy destroyers at sea are backed by Robert Browning's Home-thoughts, from the Sea.

Firemen and police officers searching through the remains of damaged houses during the Blitz are accompanied by a recitation of Rudyard Kipling's The Beginnings. Winston Churchill inspecting a parade of soldiers has his 1940 speech, We shall fight on the beaches in the background. Post-Blitz, as Churchill's speech continues, rebuilding of homes and businesses is taking place. An extract from Abraham Lincoln's Gettysburg Address coincides with footage of tanks passing the statue of Lincoln in Parliament Square with the chimes of Big Ben punctuating civilians travelling to work.

== Production ==
Words for Battle was produced with the purpose of raising morale and is an example of compilation documentary, in which various film extracts are assembled into a coherent whole, accompanied by a commentary to explain the intended message and powerfully associates these passages with music by Handel and Beethoven. This form of documentary was used for other British wartime propaganda films, such as Britain at Bay (1940).

== Reception ==
The director Humphrey Jennings described Words for Battle as being about "the Lincoln statue in Parliament Square". On this basis, film historian Michael Bartlett has emphasised the final sequence, stating that it "underlines Jennings' belief in the ordinary man and woman as both the nation's driving force and the rightful beneficiaries of victory in war", as underlined by the words of the address about "the government of the people, by the people, and for the people". Historians Anthony Aldgate and Jeffrey Richards in Britain Can Take It: British Cinema in the Second World War, have pointed to the importance of the image of St Paul's Cathedral during the Blitz, juxtaposed with Churchill's words "we shall never surrender", as one of many examples of the use of the undamaged landmark as an artistic symbol for British defiance.

Words for Battle was heavily criticised by the Documentary News Letter, a publication produced by documentary film-makers who favoured realism over poetry. It was described as:

...an illustrated lantern-slide lecture...the effect of which on morale is quite incalculable. The man who must feel most out of place is poor old Handel. As he stood on his gaily coloured barge conducting the Water Music that was to bring him back into royal favour he can hardly have guessed that it would come to this.

== DVD release ==
Words for Battle is available in the BFI DVD boxset, Land of Promise: The British Documentary Movement 1930-1950 (2008) and the Complete Humphrey Jennings: Volume 2, Fires were Started (2012). The Imperial War Museum has also released it on DVD as part of a collection of nine propaganda films, under the title: Words for Battle.
