= A Diary for Timothy =

1945 British film by Humphrey Jennings

- Directed by: Humphrey Jennings
- Written by: Humphrey Jennings; E. M. Forster
- Produced by: Basil Wright
- Starring: Myra Hess; John Gielgud; Frederick Allen; George Woodbridge
- Narrated by: Michael Redgrave
- Cinematography: Fred Gamage
- Edited by: Stewart McAllister
- Music by: Richard Addinsell
- Production company: Crown Film Unit
- Distributed by: Ministry of Information
- Release date: 1945
- Running time: 38 minutes
- Country: United Kingdom
- Language: English

A Diary for Timothy is a 1945 British documentary film directed by Humphrey Jennings. It was produced by Basil Wright for the Crown Film Unit. The narration, spoken by Michael Redgrave, was written by Jennings and E. M. Forster and is an account of the progress of the war during the first six months of the life of a baby named Timothy.

== Premise ==
The film documents a number of events. These include the recovery of an English fighter pilot Dr. Peter Roper, who was shot down in his Typhoon fighter by anti-aircraft artillery fire on 7 June 1944, from German panzer column from the 5th Panzer Army (Panzer Group West) with units from the Panzer Lehr Division and the 12th SS Hitlerjugend Division, near Monts en Bessin, south of the landing beaches of the Normandy invasion of Europe. He received AAA fire while attacking a German 5th Army Group panzer column that was blocking the advance to Caen. He was wounded through the right lower leg and yet was able to parachute from his disabled fighter.

Also featured are a coal miner, Goronwy, with a broken arm; Allan, a farmer; and Bill, a locomotive engine driver. Dame Myra Hess is featured giving a concert at the National Gallery in London, several years after her appearance in Listen to Britain (1942), and John Gielgud performs as the Prince in the gravediggers scene from Hamlet.

== Reception ==
The Monthly Film Bulletin wrote: "None of the characters or events in this film is fictitious. In fact, not a foot of this Diary was shot in the studios. Though this record of old unhappy, not-so-far-off things is interesting, it sometimes tends to jump about rather too rapidly from one happening to another, and so may prove rather difficult for Timothy and his contemporaries to follow, when they are old enough to see it, as presumably they are meant to do. Direction and photography are good."

Kine Weekly wrote: "Interestingly compiled and thought-provoking documentary."

The Daily Film Renter wrote: "The first few months in the life of a war baby (born Sept. 3, 1944) have been made into a stimulating screen scrapbook by the Crown Film Unit. Incisive direction. Thoughtful commentary spoken by Michael Redgrave. Provocative ending makes it a topical offering for every kind of audience."

Sight and Sound wrote: "With its evocative imagery and its mix of optimism and apprehension ... it links hands with Ken Loach's The Spirit of '45."

Leslie Halliwell gave the film 4/4 stars, writing: "Brilliant sentimental documentary, a summing up of the aims and feelings of Britain at the time."

== Legacy ==
In a 2000 documentary about Jennings made for Channel 4 television by Kevin MacDonald, it was revealed that the baby who was the subject of the film (Timothy James Jenkins) later moved to Brighton in the 1960s and became a mod before settling down to become a teacher; he died in November 2000.
