= River Giedd =

River in Powys, Wales

Coordinates: 51°47′3.649″N 3°45′18.857″W

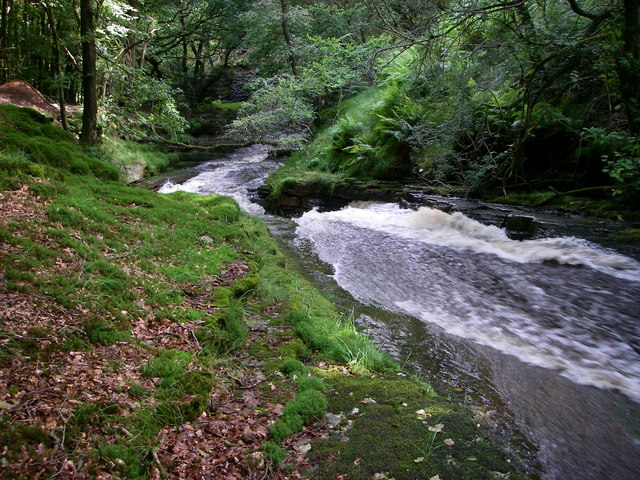
The Giedd in Giedd Forest

The River Giedd (Welsh: Afon Giedd) is a principal tributary of the River Tawe, Wales. The river runs within the county of Powys and lies almost wholly within the Brecon Beacons National Park (Parc Cenedlaethol Bannau Brycheiniog).

This river is perhaps unique in the British Isles in that there are in fact two separate rivers sharing the same name and occupying the same valley but which are not hydrologically connected. The upper Giedd rises on the southern slopes of the Old Red Sandstone mountain, Fan Brycheiniog in the Black Mountain (Y Mynydd Du) and heads south-southwest for about 3 km / 2 mi until, as it enters onto the Carboniferous Limestone outcrop it disappears into its bed. A dry valley continues in the same direction beyond the sinks and, as it crosses the Millstone Grit outcrop, gradually acquires a stream which is joined by others to become the lower Giedd. This separate river flows for about 6 km / 4 miles, passing the small village of Cwmgiedd, to its confluence with the River Tawe at Ystradgynlais in the Swansea Valley.

Dye tracing in 1970 revealed that the waters of the upper Giedd which disappear into the ground at Sinc y Giedd eventually re-emerge at Dan-yr-Ogof and do not contribute in any way to the flow of the lower Giedd.

The only significant tributary of the River Giedd is the Nant Cyw (translates as 'chick stream') entering on its left bank and whose two tributaries are in turn, the Nant Iar ('hen stream') and Nant Ceiliog ('cockerel stream').
