= Jamie Dalrymple =

English cricket player

Personal information
- Full name: James William Murray Dalrymple
- Born: 21 January 1981 (age 45); Nairobi, Kenya
- Nickname: JD, Pest
- Height: 6 ft 0 in (1.83 m)
- Batting: Right-handed
- Bowling: Right-arm off break
- Role: All-rounder, captain
- Relatives: Sophie Sackler (spouse); Simon Dalrymple (brother); Ian Dalrymple (grandfather)

International information
- National side: England (2006–2007)
- ODI debut (cap 192): 13 June 2006 v Ireland
- Last ODI: 21 April 2007 v West Indies
- ODI shirt no.: 34
- T20I debut (cap 13): 15 June 2006 v Sri Lanka
- Last T20I: 9 January 2007 v Australia
- T20I shirt no.: 34

Domestic team information
- Years: Team
- 2000–2007: Middlesex
- 2001–2003: Oxford University
- 2008–2010: Glamorgan
- 2011: Middlesex

Career statistics
Competition	ODI	T20I	FC	LA
Matches	27	3	135	166
Runs scored	487	60	6,544	3,276
Batting average	19.48	20.00	34.08	26.85
100s/50s	0/2	0/0	12/33	2/19
Top score	67	32	244	107
Balls bowled	840	30	13,533	4,955
Wickets	14	2	172	115
Bowling average	47.57	19.50	43.29	36.62
5 wickets in innings	0	0	1	0
10 wickets in match	0	0	0	0
Best bowling	2/5	1/10	5/49	4/14
Catches/stumpings	12/–	1/–	91/–	67/–
- Source: CricketArchive, 11 February 2015

James William Murray Dalrymple (born 21 January 1981) is a Kenyan-born former English cricketer, who played ODIs and T20Is for England. He is a right-handed batsman and off-spin bowler.

He is perhaps best known for taking a spectacular diving catch in a One Day International against Australia in 2007.

== Domestic career ==
Born in Nairobi, Kenya, Dalrymple made a double-century in 2003, becoming only the third batsman to do so in a Varsity match. Dalrymple has represented England at under-19 level against Sri Lanka, before captaining British Universities.

In 1999, he joined Middlesex, and with them made a career-best innings of 244 at The Oval in 2004, despite only being present as a substitute for Andrew Strauss, away making his international debut.

In November 2007, he announced he was to leave Middlesex, having turned down the offer of a new contract, saying: 'the time was right to seek a fresh challenge.' The next day, Glamorgan announced that Dalrymple had signed a three-year deal with them.

It was announced in October 2008 that Dalrymple had been appointed County Captain for the 2009 season, succeeding David Hemp.

In November 2010, he resigned from Glamorgan as a player, after being replaced as captain by incoming South African, Alviro Petersen; and, in April 2011, it was announced that he had rejoined Middlesex.

After contributing 505 runs and 10 wickets to Middlesex's 2011 County Championship season, Dalrymple was released at the end of the summer.

In July 2022, Dalrymple made his debut for Mullion Cricket Club in Cornwall where his brother Simon Dalrymple plays. He made an unbeaten 75 in a narrow victory.

== International career ==
In June 2006, he made his One Day International debut against Ireland at Stormont, Belfast, scoring 17 off as many balls, and taking 1–51 from nine overs. He also made his Twenty20 International debut against Sri Lanka later that month, taking 1–17 from two overs and scoring 1.

In addition, Dalrymple was selected in the squad to face Pakistan in the 2nd Test at Old Trafford, in what would have been his debut Test appearance. However, he was released from the squad prior to the match, with Monty Panesar preferred instead.

Dalrymple also toured India with the English One Day International team, to compete in the 2006 ICC Champions Trophy.

On 16 December 2006, he was drafted into the England Ashes Squad to replace Ashley Giles, who had flown back to England to tend to his sick wife. Although he did not play in any Test matches, he was a key member of the team during the Commonwealth Bank one-day series that followed, making a superb diving catch to dismiss Australia's Shane Watson as England won the second final.

Dalrymple was selected for England's first two games of 2007 Cricket World Cup. However, after posting only scores of 2 and 3, and taking only one wicket, he was dropped. He did, however, return for England's final game of the Super 8 series against the West Indies.

== Personal life ==
Like former Middlesex teammates Andrew Strauss and Ben Hutton, Dalrymple was educated at Radley College, before going on to study Modern History at St Peter's College, Oxford, achieving a 2:1 whilst also captaining the Blues. He is married to Sophie Sackler of the Sackler family, most known as the family behind Purdue Pharma, the makers of OxyContin, the pain relief medication at the centre of an opioid crisis in the US.

His grandfather, Ian Dalrymple, was a successful screenwriter, film director, and producer, who introduced Dirk Bogarde to the British Cinema in "Esther Waters" (1948).
