= Western Approaches (film) =

1944 film by Pat Jackson

- Directed by: Pat Jackson
- Written by: Pat Jackson
- Produced by: Ian Dalrymple
- Cinematography: Jack Cardiff
- Music by: Clifton Parker
- Production company: Crown Film Unit
- Release dates: November 9, 1944 (London, premiere); January 15, 1945 (general British release); September 27, 1946 (New York City)
- Running time: 83 minutes
- Country: United Kingdom
- Language: English

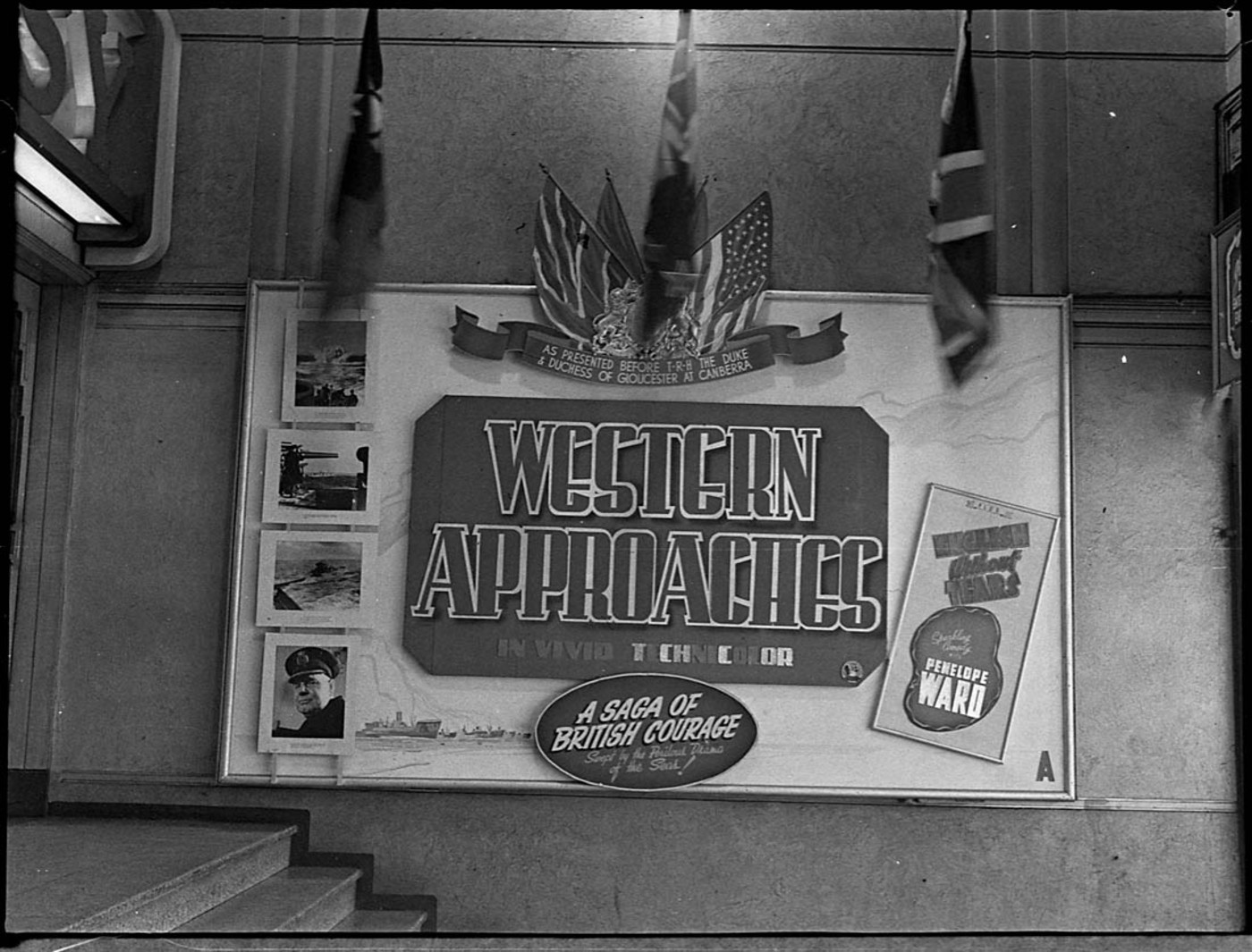
At the premiere of the film in Australia

Western Approaches is a 1944 docufiction film directed by Pat Jackson. It was the Crown Film Unit's first Technicolor production. The music is by Clifton Parker.

== Plot ==
Twenty-two British Merchant Navy sailors are adrift in a lifeboat in the North Atlantic after their freighter is sunk. They are able to signal their position by Morse code. A nearby U-boat receives the signal along with a friendly vessel which changes course to go to their rescue. The captain of the U-boat decides to wait in ambush with its two remaining torpedoes. Before the rescue ship arrives, the U-boat's periscope is spotted by those in the lifeboat, and they send a message by semaphore to the rescue ship. The U-boat fires its torpedoes just as the rescue vessel is alerted to the U-boat's presence. One of the torpedoes disables the ship, and most of the crew obey orders to abandon ship. The captain and two of his crew remain aboard, and fight back when the U-boat approaches.

== Production ==
Although set in the North Atlantic, much of the film was shot in the Irish Sea. Sailors rather than professional actors were used. The director, Pat Jackson, gave the actors only the basic outline of what he wanted them to say, and left it to them to use their own words.

== Reception ==
Trade papers reported that the film was among those "doing well" at the British box office in 1945. It was called "the outstanding documentary release" of January 1945.

The reviewer for the The Argus in Melbourne wrote in April 1945: "as entertainment, it is another triumph for the British film industry. Its principal of many virtues is in its restraint. There is a refreshing absence of big drum banging, and of what Kipling so aptly describes as jelly-bellied flag flapping. Its people are men who are getting along with a perilous and vital job, and who have no time to make a song about it. No professional cast could produce such perfect types."
