= Coastal Command (film) =

1942 British film by J. B. Holmes

- DVD
- Directed by: J. B. Holmes
- Produced by: Ian Dalrymple
- Starring: Roger Hunter; Charles Norman Lewis
- Cinematography: Teddy Catford (credited as Edward Catford); Fred Gamage; Jonah Jones
- Edited by: Michael Gordon
- Music by: Ralph Vaughan Williams
- Production companies: Crown Film Unit, Ministry of Information
- Distributed by: RKO Radio Pictures (1944) (USA)
- Release dates: 1942; 18 April 1944 (U.S.)
- Running time: 72 minutes (UK); 60 minutes (US)
- Country: United Kingdom
- Language: English

Coastal Command is a 1942 British film made by the Crown Film Unit for the Ministry of Information. The film, distributed by RKO, dramatised the work of RAF Coastal Command.

Coastal Command is a documentary-style account of the Short Sunderland and Consolidated PBY Catalina flying boats during the Battle of the Atlantic. The film includes real footage of attacks on a major enemy ship by Hudson and Beaufort bombers based in Iceland.

== Plot ==
In 1942, a Sunderland flying boat including in its crew skipper Johnny Campbell, Roger Hunter and Flight Sergeant Charles Norman Lewis, set out on a convoy-guarding patrol, flying out of their Scottish air base.

During the routine sea patrol, in which a convoy is spotted, the crew encounters and bombs a German U-boat. (Note: Two versions of the film were made, one featuring an explanatory voice-over where the attack ends with a combined air attack on an enemy cruiser caught away from its base. In the second, slightly longer version of the film, the Sunderland crew returns home after the successful attack on the cruiser, and the wounded crew member is hospitalized.)

The Sunderland's crew returns to Scotland, mission accomplished, but with a wounded crew member aboard, who is in stable condition. After a visit to the hospital, the Sunderland crew is informed they will be re-deployed to West Africa, to begin a new mission.

== Cast ==
- Jonny Hyde as Flight Lieutenant Campbell
- Roger Hunter as himself
- Charles Norman Lewis as himself

== Production ==
Coastal Command was made under the supervision of Ian Dalrymple, with the full cooperation of the Royal Air Force and the Royal Navy in the Second world War. The participants in the film were active RAF officers, NCOs and aircrew, and RN officers. The film featured Wing Commander Johnny Hyde (RAF officer) DFC in the lead role, pilot Roger Hunter, and Flight Sergeant Charles Norman Lewis. Hyde was killed in action over Norway on 29 April 1942. On 25 August 1942, Lewis was killed on a flight that Prince George, Duke of Kent was undertaking as a morale-boosting mission to Iceland.

Filming for Coastal Command took place at Pinewood Studios, Iver Heath, Buckinghamshire where an RAF Operations Room set was constructed for the Ministry of Information. Location photography also took place at RAF Bowmore and RAF Port Ellen, Glenegedale, Isle of Islay, Argyll Scotland, where Short Sunderland units were operating.

The score was by Ralph Vaughan Williams.

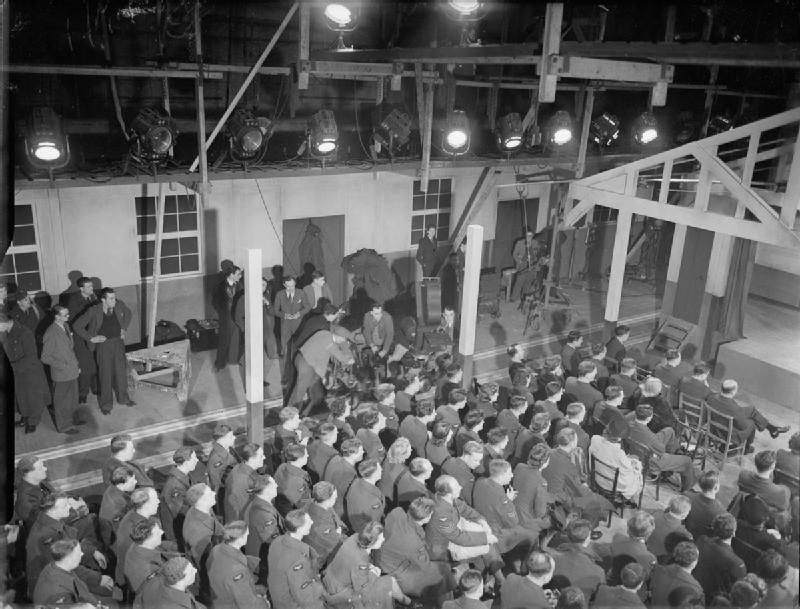
A production scene from Coastal Command.

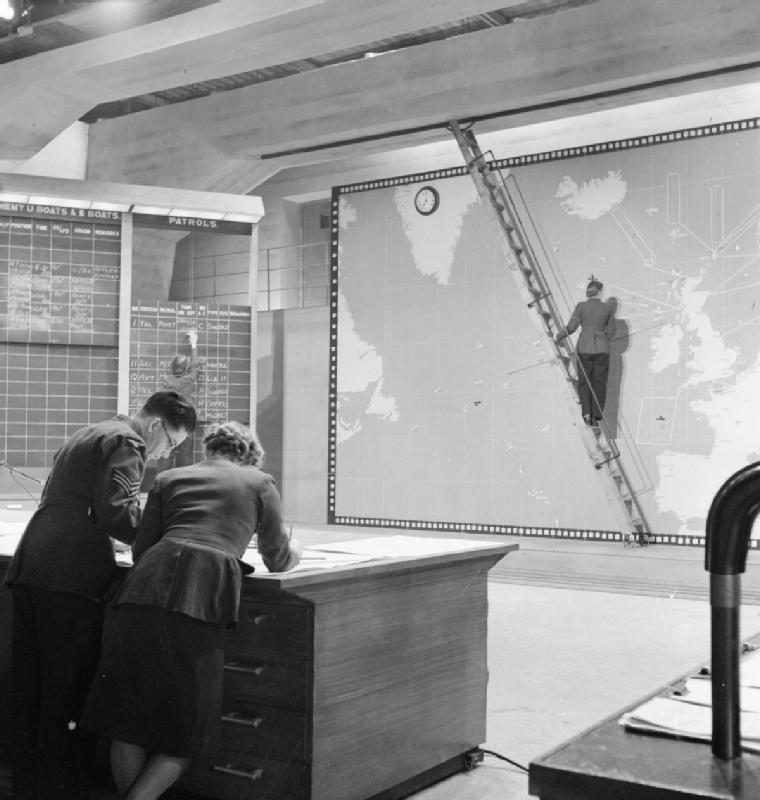
Sergeant Holland (NCOIC Ops Room Clerk) discusses a point with Plotter Assistant Section Officer Bewkey.

== Reviews ==
The performances in Coastal Command were generally well received as they were real-life depictions of a coastal command unit in wartime. After the release of Coastal Command in the United States on 18 April 1944, Bosley Crowther, film reviewer for The New York Times wrote that it suffered in comparison with the similar Memphis Belle documentary. He did write, however, that: "Many of the individual glimpses in this film are intriguing to the eye, and the whole conveys an academic notion of the personal and organizational problems of the Coastal Command. But the obvious studio-staging of much of the action in which personnel is involved and the scattered arrangement of continuity drain the film of sharp immediacy and drive. Because it jumps its scenes from one plane to another, from shore to plane — and even a few times to the Nazi ship—without adequate definition, the spectator is forced to an objective point of view. A sense of artificial construction is plainly inevitable. Thus suspense and excitement are lacking. The mood becomes fitful and blasé."
