= Guy Warrack =

Scottish composer, music educator and conductor

Guy Douglas Hamilton Warrack (6 February 1900 – 12 February 1986) was a Scottish composer, music educator and conductor. He was the son of John Warrack of the Leith steamship company, John Warrack & Co., founded by Guy's grandfather, also called John.

== Life and career ==
Warrack was born in Edinburgh. He was educated at Cargilfield Preparatory School and Winchester College, where he played organ in chapel services, arranged House choirs and played timpani in the school orchestra. At Magdalen College, Oxford he studied music under Sir Hugh Allen and Dr Ernest Walker. During his time as a student, he performed as organist at St Columba's Presbyterian Church in Oxford, as well as in Edinburgh at churches such as St George's United Free. He continued his studies at the Royal College of Music (RCM) where his professors included Holst and Vaughan Williams (composing) and Adrian Boult (conducting). He won the Foli Prize and the Tagore Gold Medal. During his RCM period he was also active in musical performance, both as conductor and timpanist.

From 1925-1935 he taught on the faculty of the Royal College of Music while conducting the Oxford Orchestral Society and their associated children's concerts. He initiated a chamber orchestra series in London (1926-7) through which The Aeolian Chamber Orchestra gave premieres of works by his contemporaries Constant Lambert, William Walton, Patrick Hadley and Gavin Gordon. Warrack also conducted at the Lyric Hammersmith and assisted Adrian Boult in an opera season at the Royal Court Theatre.

From 1936-1945 he was principal conductor of the BBC Scottish Symphony Orchestra (which he helped found with fellow Scottish composer conductor Ian Whyte), leading over 1,500 broadcasts by them and giving European premieres of works by Aaron Copland, George Frederick McKay and Daniel Gregory Mason, as well as reviving neglected repertoire. He orchestrated the piano music of Fauré for choreographer Andrée Howard's best known ballet, La Fête étrange, premiered on 23 May 1940. York Bowen wrote his Miniature Suite, Op.113 for Warrack and the winds of the BBC Scottish Orchestra in 1944.

Warrack also conducted many orchestras in London and the rest of the UK. From 1948-1951 he joined the Sadler's Wells Theatre Ballet where he conducted the premieres of Andrée Howard's Selina (1948), Richard Arnell and John Cranko's Harlequin in April (1951), and other works. In his commitment to contemporary British music, and in his capacity of Chair of the Composers' Guild, Warrack wrote to the London Symphony Orchestra in 1952 acknowledging their "shining example" in this area, and bemoaning the lack of interest in other UK musical organizations.

Warrack's other interests were wide. He was an accomplished mathematician, and the author of Sherlock Holmes and Music (Faber & Faber 1947) and Royal College of Music, the first eighty-five years, 1883-1968 and beyond (RCM, 1977).

== Composer ==
Warrack is best remembered for the music he composed for documentary films after the war, many of them for the Crown Film Unit. His first was The Last Shot (1945), which was followed by A Defeated People (1946), Theirs is the Glory (1946), Here is the Gold Coast (1947), XIVTH Olympiad - The Glory of Sport (1948), Down to the Sea (1948), The Story of Time (a film produced by Signal Films for Rolex Watches, 1951), A Queen is Crowned (1953) and The Sky is Ours (1956). Of his music for A Defeated People, portraying the shattered state of Germany in the immediate aftermath of World War II, Muir Mathieson wrote:

"Warrack secured two musical effects that immediately put him in the front rank of documentary composers. To shots of the gutted steel shell of the Krupps Essen factory, the music gives great drama by musically reconstructing the air raid that originally destroyed the plant. Another scene shows a conversation between an S.S. man on the run and a British interrogation officer, done entirely by music, with no speech whatsoever. Both items were most effective".

As a composer of concert music, Warrack has been entirely forgotten. His Variations for Orchestra was included by Donald Tovey in the Edinburgh Reid Concerts of 1931. The now lost "Edinburgh" Symphony was performed on Friday 1 April 1932 at the Royal College of Music (where he was teaching), conducted by Malcolm Sargent. It was broadcast by the BBC on 27 December 1936. The brief Hornpipe (for a Sailor Prince) for cello, trumpet and piano, based on the notes CHAS, was composed for H. R. H. Prince Charles in 1970 and has been recorded.

=== Compositions ===
- Variations for Orchestra (1924)
- Lullaby for horn and orchestra (1929)
- Wellington Square (1931, hymn tune)
- Symphony in C minor (1932)
- Divertimento Pasticciato for orchestra (1939) (in three movements: 'Prelude', 'Fugue' and 'Furiant') (pub. Boosey & Hawkes)
- 'Men of Arnhem' (1946 - march from Theirs is the Glory)
- 'Miniature Rhapsody' (1946 - extracted from his film score The Last Shot)
- Marathon Fugue for orchestra (1948 - extracted from his film score The Glory of Sport)
- Andante, Theme and Variations for cello and orchestra (pub. Boosey & Hawkes)
- Don Quixote, ballet
- Fugal Blues
- Jota for piano duet (arranged from Don Quixote)
- Songs of Burns
- Te Deum
- Waltzes - Das Strassmädchen and Der Mandelbaum, for piano duet

== Personal life ==
His first marriage was to Jacynth Ellerton in 1926. Their two children were John Warrack the music writer and critic, and Julia Mary. His second marriage was to Valentine Jeffery, who had trained as a dancer under Ninette de Valois. Their two children were Nigel (a film director, died 2016) and Giles. In the 1940s their address was Cranbourne, Fairmile Lane, Cobham in Surrey. During the 1950s and 1960s they were living at 2 Campden House Terrace in Kensington. Warrack remained active until his early eighties, at the Performing Right Society and Composers' Guild, and as a travelling examiner for the Associated Board. He died, aged 86, at Englefield Green.
