= Cwmgiedd =

Coordinates: 51.7891°N 3.7591°W

- Location within Powys
- OS grid reference: SN787115
- Community: Ystradgynlais
- Principal area: Powys
- Preserved county: Powys
- Country: Wales
- Sovereign state: United Kingdom
- Post town: Swansea
- Postcode district: SA9
- Dialling code: 01639
- Police: Dyfed-Powys
- Fire: Mid and West Wales
- Ambulance: Welsh
- UK Parliament: Brecon, Radnor and Cwm Tawe
- Senedd Cymru – Welsh Parliament: Brecon and Radnorshire

Cwmgiedd is a small village beside the River Giedd within the community of Ystradgynlais, Powys, Wales. It lies 22.5 km (15 miles) north-east of Swansea and 253 km (157 miles) west of London. The Welsh Calvinistic Methodist Yorath Chapel, first built in 1806, is in Cwmgiedd.

The Silent Village, a 1943 British propaganda film about the destruction by the Nazi occupiers of the Czech village Lidice, was filmed here, and in 2015, a graft of a Lidice pear tree was planted in the village, near the junction with the A4067, as part of the "Messenger of Hope" project.

== See also ==
- John Thomas, Baron Thomas of Cwmgiedd
- Swansea Valley
