= A Defeated People =

1946 British film by Humphrey Jennings

- Directed by: Humphrey Jennings
- Produced by: Basil Wright
- Narrated by: William Hartnell
- Music by: Guy Warrack
- Distributed by: Crown Film Unit
- Release date: 17 March 1946
- Running time: 18 minutes
- Country: United Kingdom
- Language: English

A Defeated People is a 1946 British documentary short film made by the Crown Film Unit, directed by Humphrey Jennings and narrated by William Hartnell. The film depicts the shattered state of Germany, both physically and as a society, in the immediate aftermath of World War II. The narration explains what is being done – and what needs to be done – both by the occupying Allied forces and the German people themselves to build a better Germany from the ruins.

== Synopsis ==
The film opens with a map of the German zones of occupation with the British zone highlighted. Voiceovers in a variety of English class accents offer a snapshot of what is being said about Germany in Britain ("They asked for it and they got it!", "You can't let them starve", "As far as I can see it'd be a good thing if some of them did die"). A series of images shows the country's shattered infrastructure, with destroyed roads, bridges, railway lines and factories. This is followed by shots of missing persons noticeboards and posters with the information that 30 million Germans – almost half the population – are still looking for lost relatives and friends.

Destitute children are seen sitting aimlessly in the streets. A shot of a woman nursing a baby is accompanied with the statement "We can't wash our hands of the Germans, because we can't afford that new life to flow in any direction it wants". The military authorities are shown mobilising civilians to begin the task of cleaning up and rebuilding, and it is explained that the aim is to prevent not only starvation and epidemics, but also "diseases of the mind", i.e. "new brands of Fascism". People are shown living in the cellars of bombed buildings, without heat, light, water or sanitation. Coal is singled out as the single most vital resource, with the British "Coal Control" unit organising the output and distribution of the Ruhr coalfield production. A Catch-22 situation is detailed, whereby coal is needed for power and transport, but without the power and transport infrastructure already in place the coal cannot be moved to where it needs to be. There is no coal to spare for civilian use, so the populace have to forage for timber as a power source. Civilian railway travel on what survives of the network is only possible with a permit issued by the military authorities, but the volume of passengers still overwhelms the capacity. A train is seen leaving Hamburg for Kiel with dozens of people riding the buffers or hanging on the outside, ignoring loudhailer announcements that this is forbidden.

The establishment of a new German police force is outlined, with the explanation that henceforth the policeman "must understand that he is the servant of the public, and not its master". Civilians receive food rations of between 1000 and 1200 calories per day. Survey teams from the Red Cross carry out tests on health to check whether the rations are adequate to keep people fit enough to work. Education is mentioned as a particular headache, as "you will never get Nazi ideas out of the heads of some of the adults". Children are seen playing among the ruins, but a new breed of teacher is being recruited to teach the next generation that "there are other things in life beyond Nazism and war". However schools and teachers are too few and children too many. The problem is that children are growing up "and getting more like their fathers".

The Krupp family industrial dynasty is singled out for mention as "just as responsible for killing Allied soldiers as Hitler and Göring". Footage is shown of their destroyed ammunition and armaments factories. Surviving members of the Wehrmacht are seen being processed. These men must be reassimilated into society somehow, "not only their bodies, but also their minds". If so much as one man or woman is appointed to office while still believing in Nazi values and German supremacy, "you have the beginnings of another war". Therefore, they are all put through a rigorous demobilisation screening process. Anyone who is on the wanted list, or otherwise suspect in any way. is rejected for demobilisation and sent "back to the cage".

When the nightly curfew falls, the civilian population must get off the streets and fix for themselves as best they can. Air-raid sirens sound "to remind them that it is up to them to regain their self-respect as a nation". The film ends with images of children dancing in a ring accompanied by the statement that the Allies will remain until they can be sure that the next generation will represent "a Germany of light and life and freedom...truth, tolerance and justice".

== Production ==
Footage for A Defeated People was shot in the British Zone of Occupation, covering the north-west of Germany. Filming started in August 1945. The main location chosen for filming was the area in and around the devastated city of Hamburg, with scenes of Cologne, Essen and Aachen also used.

The film was one of the first to show the consequences of World War II for ordinary German civilians, made at a time when the prevailing attitude towards them in the Allied nations was still of hostility and suspicion, alongside a desire for retribution and a sense that they were now justly reaping what they had sown and deserved every hardship that had come their way. Jennings acknowledged this in the film, while also trying maintain a neutral, non-punitive tone to highlight that attempts by the Allies to rebuild post-war Germany were vital to minimise the risk of future conflict. He admitted that it was extraordinarily difficult to find a narrative middle ground which was neither vengeful towards the German people, nor exculpatory of them. Writing to his wife from Germany, he said: "They certainly don't behave guilty or beaten. They have their old fatalism to fall back on: 'Kaput' says the housewife finding the street water pipe not working...'Kaput ... alles ist kaput.' Everything's smashed...how right – but absolutely no suggestion that it might be their fault – her fault. 'Why' asks another woman fetching water 'why do not you help us?' 'You' being us. At the same time nothing is clearer straight away than that we cannot – must not leave them to stew in their own juice ... well anyway it's a hell of a tangle."

Modern analyses of the film tend to point up a dichotomy between the narration and the images it accompanies. There are some points in the narrative which overtly state that Germany as a nation must accept collective guilt for the outcome of a war they started; the images however show people as individuals and offer a measure of sympathy for their situation and hope for a better future. The British Moving Picture Archive suggests that here Jennings as a director shows an "interest in, and concern for, common humanity (which) cannot be repressed even in such a context".

== Score ==
Muir Mathieson was the musical director and the music was composed by Guy Warrack. Both were uncredited. It was Warrack's second documentary score for Crown following The Last Shot of the year before. Mathieson wrote:

"Warrack secured two musical effects that immediately put him in the front rank of documentary composers. To shots of the gutted steel shell of the Krupps Essen factory, the music gives great drama by musically reconstructing the air raid that originally destroyed the plant. Another scene shows a conversation between an S.S. man on the run and a British interrogation officer, done entirely by music, with no speech whatsoever. Both items were most effective".

== Critical reception ==
A Defeated People received a very favourable reaction from contemporary critics, who viewed it as an important film on a vital subject of its day, which would answer many of the questions being asked by its audience about the reality of life in defeated Germany. Comments included: "Once again the Crown Film Unit do an inspired job of reporting." (Sunday Dispatch); "This film will stay in your mind and that is high praise of any film. Though it reeks of desolation and defeat it is infused with purpose. You will never obtain from any written or spoken narrative such an effect of empty misery and crushed aggressiveness, of a country so lost it is ripe for anything." (News Chronicle); "A grim panorama of destruction and ruin, of shattered industries, of tattered people living in cellars and searching for lost relatives." (The Star) and "All the more impressive for its restraint. The tone is agreeably free from gloating." (Daily Telegraph).

The main shortcoming of the film was cited as its brevity (18 minutes), meaning that it could only skim over the surface of the complex and intractable issues involved. The Daily Worker noted "It is a fine piece of screen-craft...but how the subject screams for a wider, deeper approach". The Glasgow Herald agreed that while it was "a fine example of British production", it gave the impression of having been "cut down to the bone". The Sunday Times too felt that in such a short running-time "the attempt to cover...the whole task of the Military Government in the British zone is hopeless".

== Copyright status ==
A Defeated People is attested to be in the public domain in the United States, and is available for viewing or free download on the Internet Archive.
