= Johnny Hyde (RAF officer) =

British Air Force officer (1914–1942)

Wing Commander Ernest Leslie Hyde DFC
- Born: 1914; Milford on Sea, Hampshire, England
- Died: 29 April 1942 (aged 28); Trondheim, Norway
- Military career
- Allegiance: United Kingdom
- Branch: Royal Air Force
- Rank: Wing Commander
- Nickname: Johnny Hyde
- Awards: DFC

Wing Commander Ernest Leslie ‘Johnny’ Hyde DFC (1914–1942), was a British senior officer in the Royal Air Force during World War II, best known for his lead role in the Ministry of Information film Coastal Command that was released after his early death from wounds suffered during air operations over Norway in 1942.

== Life ==
Ernest Leslie Hyde was born at Milford on Sea, Hampshire in 1914, the son of Lieutenant-Colonel Charles Bernard Hyde and Mary-Anne (née Clarke). He was educated at Bedford Modern School and later trained for the Merchant Navy on HMS Worcester.

In May 1933, Hyde was appointed a midshipman in the Royal Naval Reserve but two years later was granted a commission in the RAF as acting pilot officer. He was promoted Flying Officer in 1937 and Flight Lieutenant in 1939. After training he served with units in the Coastal Command and was awarded the DFC on 1 June 1940 for gallantry and devotion to duty in the execution of air operations with this command in northern waters:

This officer has done consistently good work since the outbreak of war. On the 8th April he reported the position of the German battle fleet and made a successful reconnaissance. although his aircraft was badly damaged by anti-aircraft fire. On 9th April, while on reconnaissance duty over Norway, he was attacked by two enemy aircraft which he engaged until damage to his petrol tanks and gun turret forced him to break off. He crawled inside the wings and stopped up many holes in the tanks, until overcome by fumes; had this not been done the aircraft would not have reached its base.

Hyde was promoted Squadron Leader in 1940, and Wing Commander in 1942. He was flying a Beaufighter over Norway in April 1942 when he was attacked by German aircraft. The aircraft landed in the sea, the wreckage still visible by divers today; contemporary accounts indicate that both Hyde and his co-pilot were alive following the crash but were later reported dead.

Hyde died on 29 April 1942 and is buried at Trondheim (Stavne) war cemetery. He was survived by his wife Dorothy, and daughter Felicity Anne.
