= Worth the Risk? =

1948 British public information film

- Production company: Crown Film Unit
- Release date: 1948
- Running time: 10 mins.
- Country: United Kingdom
- Language: English

Worth the Risk? is a 1948 British short public information film highlighting the importance of road safety. It was produced by the Crown Film Unit and funded by the Ministry of Transport.

== Synopsis ==
The film opens at an emergency telephone exchange, which receives a request for an ambulance once every 3½ minutes. A call is placed about a road traffic accident on Shoreditch Road. An ambulance is dispatched to the scene of the incident.

A series of scenes illustrate careless behaviour that could lead to road accidents. This includes a boy running out into the road in front of a car, a drunk man behind the wheel who nearly knocks over a pedestrian, and a cyclist with faulty brakes who runs into the back of a lorry.

Two further stories are shown. Mr Smith is driving to work along a familiar route, cutting corners to save time. On one morning, he almost has a collision with a lorry when going around a bend. Miss Jones is a pedestrian who pays little attention to oncoming traffic, assuming that vehicles will always stop to allow her to cross. One day, she is fatally hit by a driver whose brakes are faulty.

A man is shown leaving a cinema in which he has been watching the road safety film. He has paid little attention to the film, assuming that "accidents only happen to other people". As he walks out into the road, the screen cuts to a view of a "Get Home Safe and Sound" poster, accompanied by the sound of screeching brakes.

== Reception ==
The Monthly Film Bulletin wrote: "The [Education Panel Viewing Committee] are of the opinion that this is one of the best Safety First films for adults that they have seen. The approach is direct, very direct, even brutal, and makes its points forcibly. It can be thoroughly recommended for adult audiences. It is, of course, unsuitable for school purposes."

For BFI Screenonline Katy McGahan wrote: "Worth the Risk? propels us into a circus of recklessness carried out by drivers, pedestrians and cyclists alike, whose carelessness and impetuosity on the streets of London demonstrate the universal human complacency, 'it won't happen to me'. The film sets out to dispel this theory through a strenuous fusion of slapstick comedy and shocking realism. ... Arresting photography and sharp editing further compel the viewer, as do the hair-raising near-misses and collisions, convincingly depicted with the help of hired stunt artists."

== Home media ==
The film is included on the DVD COI Collection: Volume 6 - Worth the Risk (BFI, 2000).
