= Pandaemonium (Jennings book) =

Compilation of contemporary observations of the Industrial Revolution

Pandæmonium, 1660–1886: The Coming of the Machine as Seen by Contemporary Observers
- Author: Humphrey Jennings
- Subject: Industrial Revolution
- Publisher: Icon Books, Picador
- Publication date: 1985
- Media type: Book
- Pages: 416

Pandæmonium, 1660–1886: The Coming of the Machine as Seen by Contemporary Observers is a book of contemporary observations of the coming, development, and impact of the Industrial Revolution in the United Kingdom, collected by documentary film-maker Humphrey Jennings and published posthumously in 1985 by Icon Books having received funding for the project from the Elephant Trust. The book takes its title from the first excerpt within it, the section in Book I of Paradise Lost (1660) in which John Milton describes the building of Pandæmonium, the capital city of Hell.

Jennings collated the excerpts between 1937 and his early death in 1950. Jennings' daughter, Mary-Louise Jennings, and a co-founder with Jennings of Mass Observation, Charles Madge, brought his work to publication in 1985. The first edition was published by André Deutsch Ltd, where Diana Athill was its editor. Reviewing Pandæmonium, the New York Times said, "Many of the early milestones of industrialization and its effects have become textbook cliches, and a routine anthology devoted to the subject would hardly call for special attention. But Pandaemonium is far from routine; it reflects the deeply felt preoccupations of an unusual man", and said that through the texts selected, the book "conveys the heroic promise of industrialism as well as the devastation, the humanistic spirit of science as well the dehumanizing dangers".

== 2012 Summer Olympics opening ceremony ==
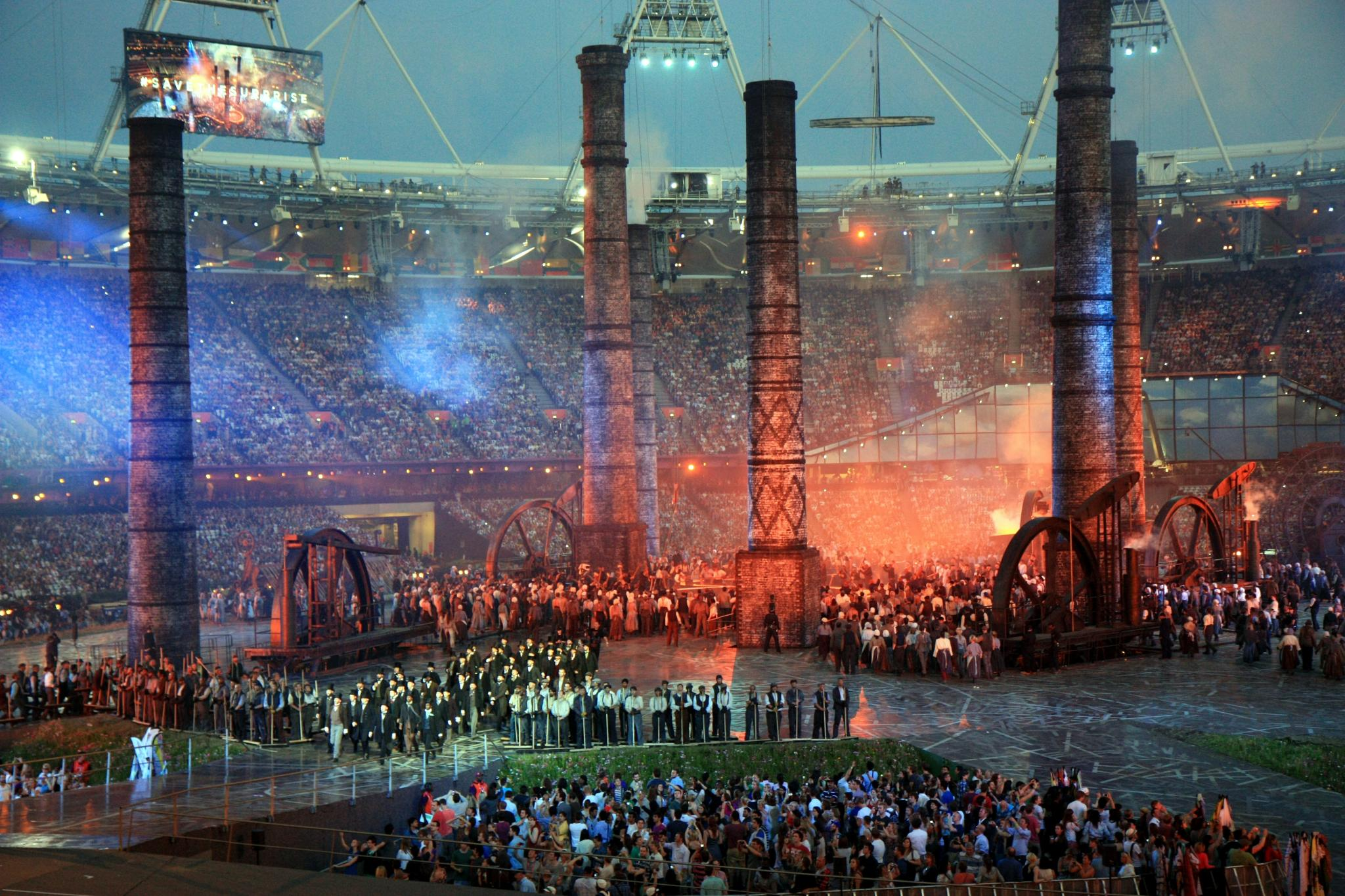
Scene from the "Pandemonium" section of the 2012 Summer Olympics opening ceremony; rehearsal 23 July 2012.

Writer Frank Cottrell Boyce, a longtime fan of the book, said of it "When I first held this book in my hand, I swear I could feel it shaking with its own internal energy." Director Danny Boyle was working on a West End theatrical production of Mary Shelley's Frankenstein, which opened in February 2011, and Cottrell Boyce had given Boyle a copy of Pandæmonium to help inform the Industrial Revolution sequence in the play. At the same time, Boyle and Cottrell Boyce were developing the opening ceremony for the 2012 Summer Olympics, with Boyle as its artistic director and Cottrell Boyce as the writer. Cottrell Boyce commented "Danny had a very clear idea that in the first 15 minutes [of the ceremony] you had to have a great, startling image that could go around the world. It had to climax with something that made people go, Oh my God!", and Boyle decided that "the journey from the pastoral to the industrial, ending with the forging of the Olympic rings" was that image. Boyle made Pandæmonium required reading for his opening ceremony team. The resulting section of the ceremony was named "Pandemonium", in acknowledgement of both Milton and Jennings' works.

== Re-publication ==
Following an attempt to get the out-of-print 1985 edition published as an e-book, a new condensed edition of the book was published in October 2012, with a foreword by Frank Cottrell Boyce. It represents about a third of the original edition. Writing of the new edition, Diana Athill observed "[On its original publication in 1985] it received many perceptive and enthusiastic reviews, but it has taken Boyle to shift it from academic appreciation to the general readership for which it was intended and which it deserves."
