= Fires Were Started =

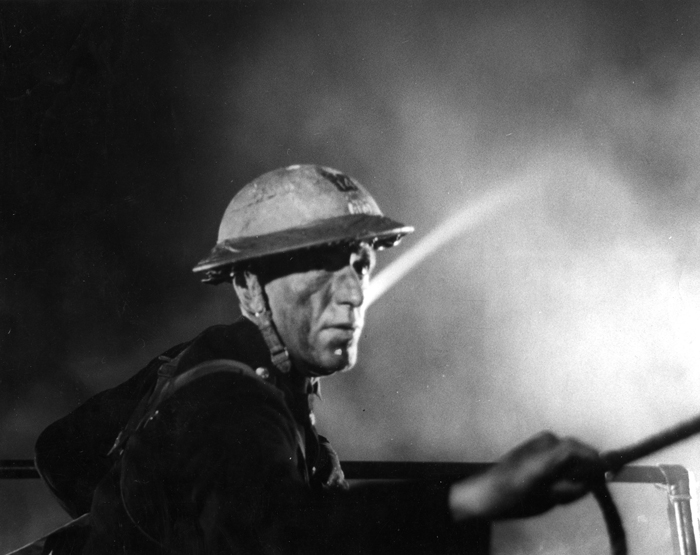
- Still from the documentary Fires Were Started
- Directed by: Humphrey Jennings
- Written by: Humphrey Jennings
- Produced by: Ian Dalrymple
- Starring: William Sansom; George Gravett; Phillip Wilson-Dickson; Fred Griffiths; Loris Rey; Johnny Houghton; T. P. Smith; John Barker
- Cinematography: C.M. Pennington-Richards
- Edited by: Stewart McAllister
- Music by: William Alwyn
- Distributed by: Crown Film Unit
- Release date: 12 April 1943 (UK)
- Running time: 65 min.
- Country: United Kingdom
- Language: English

Fires Were Started (also known as I Was a Fireman) is a 1943 British film written and directed by Humphrey Jennings and produced by the Crown Film Unit. Filmed in documentary style, it shows the lives of firefighters over one day and night of the Blitz during the Second World War. The film uses actual firemen (including Cyril Demarne) rather than professional actors.

== Scenario ==
During the day, a dockside Auxiliary Fire Service station services its equipment. That night there is an air-raid and the fire-fighters attend a major warehouse fire. Two stranded firemen are rescued from a collapsing roof, but a third dies. The film closes with his funeral.

== Cast ==
The film does not have on-screen cast credits. The following is sourced from the BFI.

- Commanding Officer George Gravett as Sub-officer Dykes
- Leading Fireman Philip Wilson-Dickson as Section Officer Walters
- Leading Fireman Fred Griffiths as Johnny Daniels
- Leading Fireman Loris Rey as J. Rumbold, 'Colonel'
- Fireman Johnny Houghton as S.H. 'Jacko' Jackson
- Fireman T.P. Smith as B.A. Brown
- Fireman John Barker as Joe Vallance
- William Sansom as Mike Barrett
- Assistant Group Officer Green as Mrs Townsend
- Firewoman Betty Martin as Betty
- Firewoman Eileen White as Eileen

== Production ==
Exterior shots were filmed on location, while the interior scenes were shot at Pinewood Studios. Jennings's first cut of the film was titled I Was a Fireman and ran to 74 minutes. This was cut down to 65 minutes and released as Fires Were Started.

== Reception ==
The Monthly Film Bulletin wrote: "Here is an intimate natural study of the front-line civilians of the fire-fighting service, a lucid exposition of their methods, their equipment and their organisation. Camera and sound track are used with a sure story-telling sense to present the firemen and firewomen themselves, their cheerfulness and their heroism. With a more imaginative reach, however, much more could have been made of this material. This film fails to exploit the dramatic fury of acre upon acre of raging flames – an aspect which, apart from its propaganda and instructive value, has an essential place in any record of this chapter of London's history."

Kine Weekly wrote: "This Crown Film Unit production is a fitting tribute to the work of the A.F.S. in the blitzes of 1940 and is also first-rate entertainment. ... The treatment is natural, the thrills realistic and the human touch perfect. All the principal roles are taken by members of the fire-fighting service, and their performances are universally natural. ... All minor roles, too, are very capably filled. Ian Dalrymple is to be congratulated, not only on the fact that he has given us some of the most vivid fire-fighting sequences yet put on the screen, but also because he has introduced us to a bunch of men whom we are very glad to have met."

Picturegoer wrote: "A fine tribute to the N.F.S. and fine entertainment as well. ... Humour is not lacking and Ian Dalrymple deserves congratulations on a very convincing piece of work."

Picture Show wrote: "Another triumph for Crown Film Unit. ... A film of laughter and tears, a credit to all who had a hand in the making of it."

Dilys Powell of the Sunday Times declared its authenticity to be 'moving and terrifying'.

== See also ==
- BFI Top 100 British films

== Bibliography ==
- Winston, Brian (1999). Fires Were Started. BFI Film classics. London: BFI Publishing. ISBN 978-0-85170-773-0.
