= Simon Dalrymple =

English cricketer

Simon Hedley Dalrymple (born 6 June 1983) is an English former cricketer.

Born in Worcester, Dalrymple was educated at Radley and Christ Church, Oxford. He made two first-class appearances for Oxford University Cricket Club in 2002 and 2004, both against Cambridge University. A middle-order batsman, he scored 40 runs in total, with a highest of 15 not out.

He is the younger brother of former Glamorgan captain Jamie Dalrymple.
