= Listen to Britain =

- Title card
- Directed by: Humphrey Jennings; Stewart McAllister
- Written by: Humphrey Jennings; Stewart McAllister
- Produced by: Ian Dalrymple
- Starring: Chesney Allen; Bud Flanagan; Myra Hess
- Narrated by: Leonard Brockington
- Cinematography: H.E. Fowle
- Edited by: Humphrey Jennings; Stewart McAllister; John Krish (uncredited)
- Production company: Crown Film Unit
- Distributed by: Ministry of Information−
- Release date: 1942
- Running time: 19 minutes
- Country: United Kingdom
- Language: English

Listen to Britain is a 1942 British propaganda short film by Humphrey Jennings and Stewart McAllister. The film was produced during World War II by the Crown Film Unit, an organisation within the British Government's Ministry of Information to support the Allied war effort. The film was nominated for the inaugural Academy Award for Best Documentary Feature in 1943, but lost against four other Allied propaganda films. It is noted for its nonlinear structure and its use of sound.

== American introduction, British fears and critical reception ==
For the American release, Listen to Britain opens with a foreword spoken by Leonard Brockington added by a "nervous civil servant" as there were fears that Americans might be confused by the ambiguity of the film's message. The forewords begins with the famous Listening to Britain poem:

I am a Canadian. I have been listening to Britain. I have heard the sound of her life by day and by night. Many years ago, a great American, speaking of Britain, said that in the storm of battle and conflict, she had a secret rigour and a pulse like a cannon. In the great sound picture that is here presented, you too will hear that heart beating. For blended together in one great symphony is the music of Britain at war. The evening hymn of the lark, the roar of the Spitfires, the dancers in the great ballroom at Blackpool, the clank of machinery and shunting trains. Soldiers of Canada holding in memory, in proud memory, their home on the range. The BBC sending truth on its journey around the world. The trumpet call of freedom, the war song of a great people. The first sure notes of the march of victory, as you, and I, listen to Britain.

Before the introduction was added, Edgar Anstey in The Spectator thought the film would be a complete disaster. Writing in the Documentary News Letter, Anstey complained:

By the time Humphrey Jennings has done with it, it has become the rarest bit of fiddling since the days of Nero. It will be a disaster if this film is sent overseas. One shudders to imagine the effect upon our allies should they learn that an official British film-making unit can find the time these days to contemplate the current sights and sounds of Britain...

However, Anstey admitted that Listen To Britain "had enormous influence overseas" and the film went down very well with audiences. Helen de Mouilpied (later the wife of Denis Forman), the deputy head of non-theatrical distribution for the Ministry of Information, recalled:

All sorts of audiences felt it to be a distillation and also a magnification of their own experiences on the home front. This was especially true of factory audiences. I remember one show in a factory in the Midlands where about 800 workers clapped and stamped approval.

Roger Manvell then working as the Films Officer in the South West and later North-West of the country, claimed he always tried to show the film as the:

...poetic and emotional life they gave the programmes as a whole. I do not exaggerate when I say that members of audiences under the emotional strains of war ... frequently wept as a result of Jennings' direct appeal to the rich cultural heritage of Britain....

The success of Listen To Britain in influencing British public opinion vindicates Jennings and shows "boundary lines in the debate over social utility and aesthetic pleasure are not as distinct as they may seem."

== Poetry, propaganda, myth and ambiguity ==
Listen to Britain may be considered as artistic or poetic but the film is based on ambiguity and doubt. Mass-Observation, co-founded by Humphrey Jennings in 1937, found in the war's early years that the public considered it "un-British to shove propaganda down your throat", so Jennings realised that he would have to take a different approach to succeed. Jennings therefore chose to hide the propaganda with ambiguity. The film is therefore part of what Stuart Legg called the 'Poetic Line', in spite of Anstey and Anderson's beliefs that poetry and propaganda were incompatible, and the use of poetry in relation to the constraints imposed by the audience and motivations of Jennings and the Ministry of Information in making the film is central to understanding the film as a work of propaganda. "Poetry and propaganda come together in the myth of the people's war."

In Listen to Britain, Jennings is selling a myth of national unity; that in spite of pre-war differences all classes were united in war socialism but it's a bottom up view that highlights individuality, the "unity within difference". Having learnt through Mass Observation that the British people were uncomfortable with detecting propaganda, Jennings used a poetic style to mask it. The use of sound was vital in this, allowing the montage of shots to imply hidden meaning, such as the sound of an unseen aircraft on a seemingly peaceful day. Edgar Anstey feared the "beauty" would detract from the message and when the film was released in America, an introduction was added because the art had made the message ambiguous. Only at the end was the film's ambiguity dropped as Rule, Britannia! plays out over a sequence that at last implies 'totalised' unity. "Propaganda finally wins out over poetry".

A 'voice of God' narrator is absent but Jennings uses the vastly different sounds from people of different classes at home or in the work place as the voice of the people. These sounds, and especially the songs, help unite the viewer. Jennings conceals his own voice behind an impersonal style so the viewer can listen to the sounds of Britain. Jennings also goes further, using creative treatment and reconstruction to mislead the audience who may believe they are watching vérité. Leaving in the serendipitous stumbling child and Jennings' obsessive technique, pointed out by Mike Leigh, of getting the actors to scratch their noses, adds to this sense. This non-perfected style contrasts markedly with more traditional, overt propaganda. While Jennings ignores many genuine problems, such as showing un-bombed homes or menus not ration cards, the use of sound without narration allowed Jennings to mask the propaganda as the meanings were not imposed on the viewer. This allowed the audience to make up their own mind from the images and the music alone, and this apparent freedom, along with the many, diverse voices, helps conceal the true nature of the message as Geoffrey Nowell Smith explains.

Jennings makes the tensions in the myth's construction central to the film. Britton believes the myth was created to benefit the elite's Imperial war, while Leach believes aspirations for future social change were integral to the war unity ideology. Jennings highlights class distinctions and hints at the tension between the forces for and resistant to social change. Accepting the myth's fragility, the scene with the music hall double act Flanagan and Allen performing to a working class audience cuts straight to the Queen enjoying the music of Myra Hess at one of the (London) National Gallery's lunch-time classical music concerts. Whether the classes are united with the Queen among her people or rich and poor are permanently divided is up to the viewer. Likewise gender; women are shown firmly within the family unit despite a sub-textual admission of future liberation aspirations. This ambiguity masks and therefore strengthens the propaganda.

In Mein Kampf, Hitler talks of the success of British propaganda in World War I believing people's ignorance meant simple repetition and an appeal to feelings over reason would suffice. In contrast, Jennings' "calm voice of reason appeals to the mind rather than emotion". In Triumph of the Will, for example, Leni Riefenstahl works with the myth and ignores the reality, while Jennings acknowledges their differences. A. J. P. Taylor believes Britain's war socialism represented genuine unity, allowing Jennings to admit these tensions given the public's distaste for overt propaganda. Thus for Jennings the poetry and propaganda "enrich and unsettle each other". This subtle reflection upon the myth "genuinely was propaganda as art, an extraordinary feat which Triumph of the Will doesn't come near, thankfully".

== Occurrences in other works ==
In 2012, London-based band Public Service Broadcasting released Waltz for George which uses images taken from several Ministry of Information war films, though mostly from Listen to Britain, to accompany the radio report on the soldiers returning from Dunkirk. The same year, they also released London Can Take It with audio and video taken exclusively from Jennings' 1940 propaganda documentary of the same name.

A "spiritual successor" documentary of the same name by Stephen Noorshargh was released in 2023.

== Bibliography ==
- Aldgate, A. and Richards, J., (2007). Britain Can Take It: British Cinema in the Second World War, I.B. Tauris, London
- Harrison, T., (1982), 'Films and the Home Front – The Evaluation of their effectiveness by Mass Observation' in Pronay, N., and Spring, D.W., (eds) Propaganda, Politics and Film, 1918–45, Macmillan, London.
- Hitler, A., (1924), Mein Kampf, Chapter 6, 'War Propaganda', reproduced in 'War Propaganda', in Marwick, A., and Simpson, W. (eds) (2000) Primary Sources 2: Interwar and World War II, The Open University Press, Milton Keynes.
- Kula, S., (1985), 'Theatres of War:Propaganda 1918–45', Archivaria 20
- Leach, J., (1998) 'The Poetics of Propaganda Humphrey Jennings and 'Listen to Britain' in Grant, B.K., and Sloniowski, J., (eds), Documenting the Documentary, Wayne State University Press, Detroit.
- Leach, T., British Film Resource, Humphrey Jennings and Third Cinema.
- Manvell, R., (1976), Films and the Second World War, Dell, New York
- Taylor, A.J.P., (1965), English History 1914–1945, Oxford University Press, Oxford.
- Walford, M., Listen to Britain (1942): Dir. Humphrey Jennings Warwick University Blog
