= Myra Hess =

English pianist (1890–1965)

Dame Dame Myra Hess
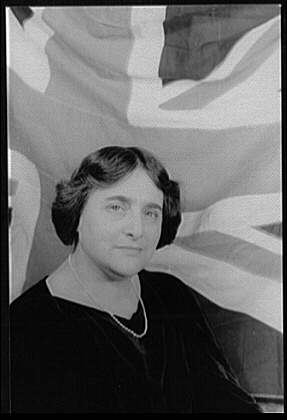
- Myra Hess, photographed by Carl Van Vechten, in 1937
- Born: February 25, 1890; South Hampstead, London, England
- Died: November 25, 1965 (aged 75); London, England
- Occupation: Pianist
- Known for: Wartime National Gallery lunchtime concerts
- Relatives: Nigel Hess (great-nephew); Nigel Lawson (great-nephew)
- Awards: DBE (1941), CBE (1936)

Dame Julia Myra Hess (25 February 1890 – 25 November 1965) was an English pianist known for her performances of the works of Bach, Mozart, Beethoven, Schumann, and Brahms. She famously organised concerts in London during the Second World War and The Blitz.

== Career ==
=== Early life ===
Julia Myra Hess was born on 25 February 1890 to a Jewish family in South Hampstead, London. Her paternal grandfather had immigrated from Alsace. She was the youngest of four children and began piano lessons at the age of five. She studied at the Guildhall School of Music and at the Royal Academy of Music under Tobias Matthay, after winning a scholarship to the latter in 1903 at age 12.

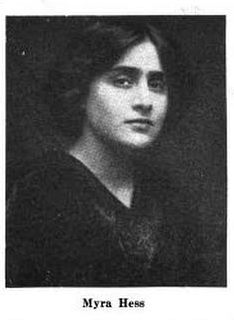
Hess in 1921

External audio
- Hess performing Brahms' Piano Trio No. 2 with cellist Gaspar Cassado and violinist Jelly D'Arani in 1935 (on archive.org)
- Hess playing her piano transcription of Bach's "Jesu, Joy of Man's Desiring" in 1940 (on archive.org)

Hess's debut came in 1907 when she played Beethoven's Piano Concerto No. 4 with Thomas Beecham conducting. She went on to tour through Britain, the Netherlands and France, with the violinist Aldo Antonietti, with whom she had a love affair. In 1912 she performed with the Amsterdam Concertgebouw Orchestra conducted by Willem Mengelberg.

During World War I large-scale musical activity ceased in Britain and Europe.

After her American debut in New York City on 24 January 1922, Hess became a favourite in the United States, as both a soloist and ensemble player.

=== Second World War ===
Hess garnered greater fame during the Second World War when, with all concert halls blacked out at night to avoid being targeted by German bombers, she organised almost 2,000 lunchtime concerts. The concerts began shortly after the war began and continued through The Blitz. The concerts were held at the National Gallery, in Trafalgar Square. Hess began her lunchtime concerts a few weeks after the start of the war. They were presented on Monday to Friday, for six-and-a-half years without fail. If the Gallery building in central London was being bombed, the concert was occasionally relocated before returning. Promising young performers (such as Eiluned Davies, who gave the UK premiere of Shostakovich's Piano Sonata, Op. 12 at the Gallery on 31 May 1943) were given the opportunity to appear in the concerts alongside established musicians, initially for no fee but after a while all the performers received a standard 'expense fee' of five guineas, no matter who they were, with the exception of Hess herself, who never took a fee for her appearances in the series.

In all, Hess presented 1,698 concerts seen by 824,152 people; she personally played in 150 of them. She made a brief appearance performing at one of her lunchtime concerts in the 1942 wartime documentary Listen to Britain (directed by Humphrey Jennings and Stewart McAllister), a performance enjoyed by the Queen in the audience.

For this contribution to maintaining the morale of the populace of London, King George VI created her a Dame Commander of the Order of the British Empire in 1941. (She had previously been created a CBE in 1936.) Hess's lunchtime concerts influenced the formation of the City Music Society, according to the organisation's website.

=== Post-war career ===
In 1946, Arturo Toscanini invited Hess to perform with the NBC Symphony Orchestra in New York City. According to Toscanini's biographer Mortimer Frank, after Hess and the conductor had failed to agree on tempos for Beethoven's Fifth Piano Concerto, they decided instead to perform Beethoven's Third. The 24 November 1946 broadcast concert was preserved on transcription discs and later issued on CD by Naxos Records.

Hess performed the Brahms Piano Concerto No. 2 with Bruno Walter and the New York Philharmonic Orchestra in February 1951, with the solo cello performed by Leonard Rose.

At the Prades Festival in 1952 Hess performed the Brahms Piano Trio Op. 87 with violinist Joseph Szigeti and cellist Pablo Casals.

Hess was most renowned for her interpretations of the works of Mozart, Beethoven, Schumann, and Brahms, but had a wide repertoire, ranging from Domenico Scarlatti to contemporary works. She gave the premiere of Howard Ferguson's Piano Sonata and his Piano Concerto. She also played a good amount of chamber music and performed in a piano duo with Irene Scharrer who was her cousin. Hess promoted public awareness of the piano duet and two-piano works of Schubert.

In 1926 and 1934 Hess arranged, for both solo piano and for two pianos the chorale Wohl mir, daß ich Jesum habe from Bach's Cantata Herz und Mund und Tat und Leben (BWV 147). This is Movement 6 of the cantata; the music is the same for Movement 10, Jesus bleibet meine Freude. Each of these movements takes its text from a verse of the hymn Jesu, meiner Seelen Wonne by Martin Janus (or Jahn). Her arrangement was published under the title Jesu, Joy of Man's Desiring, which is a rough translation of the name of this hymn, although the line does not itself appear in Bach's cantata.

=== Protégés and influence ===
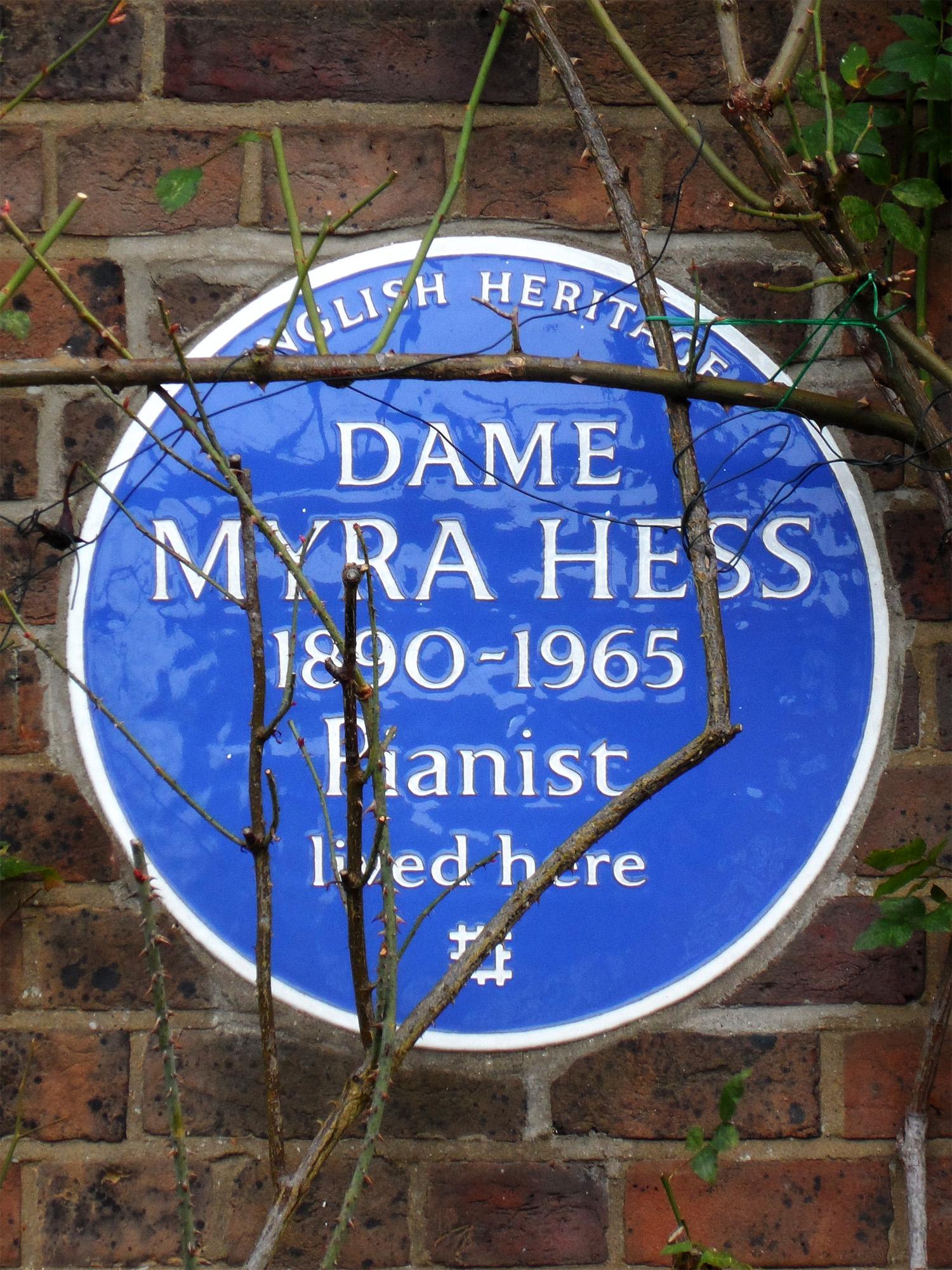
Blue plaque erected in 1987 by English Heritage at 48 Wildwood Road, Hess's home

Hess's protégés included Clive Lythgoe and Richard and John Contiguglia. She also taught Stephen Kovacevich (then known as Stephen Bishop) and Jane Carlson. She also has a link to jazz, having given lessons in the 1920s to Elizabeth Ivey Brubeck, mother of Dave Brubeck. From 1960 to 1961 she taught Yonty Solomon.

Arnold Bax's 1915 piano piece In a Vodka Shop is dedicated to Hess.

=== Last concert and retirement ===
In September 1961, Hess played her final public concert at London's Royal Festival Hall. She was forced to retire after suffering a stroke in early 1961 that left her with permanent brain damage. By the end of the summer of that year it became clear that her public playing days were over. She continued to teach a handful of students, notably Stephen Kovacevich, during her last years.

== Death ==
On 25 November 1965, Hess died at the age of 75 of a heart attack in her London home. A blue plaque marks her residence at 48 Wildwood Road in Hampstead Garden Suburb, London.

Hess's Steinway piano remains at the Bishopsgate Institute and has been renamed "Myra The Steinway" in her honour.

Hess's great-nephews included the British composer Nigel Hess, who named his music publishing company Myra Music in her honour, and the Conservative politician and former Chancellor of the Exchequer Nigel Lawson.

== Chicago Dame Myra Hess Memorial Concerts ==
In 1977, the Chicago Cultural Center began a series of free lunchtime concerts held at its Preston Bradley Hall every Wednesday from 12:15 pm to 1:00 pm, named in Hess's honour as the Dame Myra Hess Memorial Concerts. The series is produced by Chicago's International Music Foundation, with performances at Seventeenth Church of Christ Scientist in Chicago. Since 1977, the concerts have been broadcast live on radio station WFMT and streamed at WFMT.com. The concert series was relocated in 2021 to the Seventeenth Church of Christ Scientist located at 55 E. Wacker Drive.

== Bibliography ==
- Denise Lassimonne and Howard Ferguson, eds.: Myra Hess by her Friends (1966)
- Marion McKenna: Myra Hess, a Portrait (1976)
- Jessica Duchen: Myra Hess – National Treasure, Kahn & Averill (2025)
