= Target for Tonight =

1941 film by Harry Watt

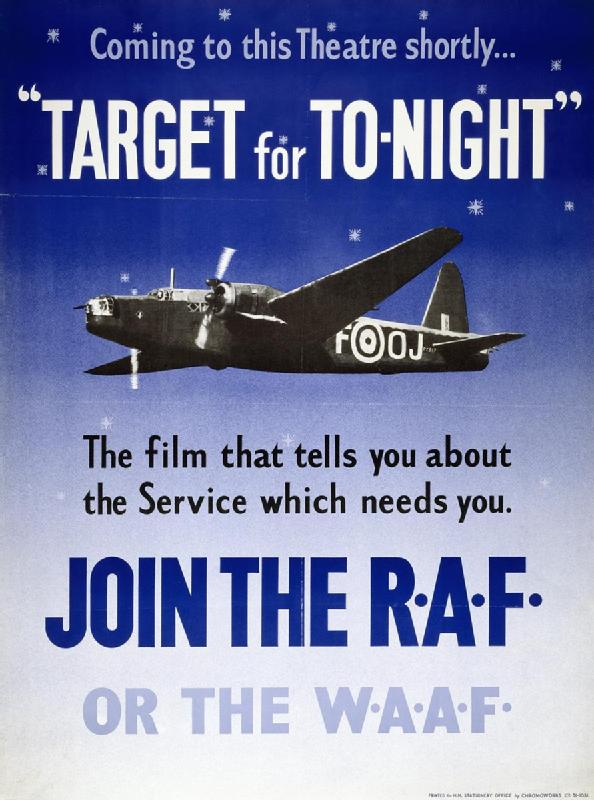
- Pre-release theatrical poster
- Directed by: Harry Watt
- Produced by: Harry Watt
- Starring: Royal Air Force personnel
- Edited by: S. McAllister; Alfred Hitchcock (uncredited)
- Music by: Central Band of the Royal Air Force
- Production company: Crown Film Unit
- Distributed by: British Ministry of Information; Associated British Film Distributors
- Release date: 25 July 1941
- Running time: 48 minutes
- Country: United Kingdom
- Language: English
- Budget: £7,000
- Box office: £100,000 or £245,453 (UK)

Target for Tonight (or Target for To-Night) is a 1941 British World War II documentary film billed as filmed and acted by the Royal Air Force, all during wartime operations. It was directed by Harry Watt for the Crown Film Unit. The film is about the crew of a Wellington bomber taking part in a bombing mission over Nazi Germany. The film won an honorary Academy Award in 1942 as Best Documentary by the National Board of Review. Despite purporting to be a documentary there are multiple indicators that it is not quite as such: film shots include studio shots taken from the exterior of the aircraft looking into the cockpit whilst "in flight"; several stilted sections of dialogue are clearly scripted; on the ground shots of bombing are done using model trains; and several actors appear, including Gordon Jackson as the young rear gunner. The film does give a unique insight into the confined nature of the Wellington's interior and some of the nuances of day-to-day operation such as ground crew holding a blanket over the engine while it starts, in order to regulate oxygen intake.

== Plot ==
After text cards explaining RAF Bomber Command chain of command, the film begins with an Avro Anson flying over an RAF base and dropping a box of undeveloped film. After developing and analysis, it reveals that a major oil storage facility has been built at Freihausen in the Freiburg region. A squadron of Vickers Wellingtons are allocated to attack it that night. The planning of a mission to reach and hit the target is depicted, detailing how munitions for the task are selected. The two aircraft tasked to lead the attack are to be loaded with incendiary bombs in order to set the wood around the target on fire, whilst the rest of the squadron carry 4 x 500-pound (230 kg) and 1 x 1,000-pound (450 kg) high explosive bombs. One bomb on each aircraft is a delayed-action bomb.

The weather forecast is expected to be good, and the aircrews are briefed. Among the pilots is P. C. Pickard, a real life RAF officer and holder of the DSO. In the film Pickard is "Squadron Leader Dixon", the pilot of Wellington "F-OJ", call sign "F for Freddie".

Once the briefing is completed the crew suit up before being driven to their bomber located on the airfield dispersal. The station groundcrew assist with the starting of the aircraft's engines, before it taxies to the end of the airfield and with clearance obtained from the runway controller, the crew take off into the dusk. The time is 19 h 51.

Over Germany the target is reached at 23 h 45 with bombs released at 23 h 53, the first four falling short of the target but the final one scoring a direct hit. As the aircraft clears the target area it is hit by flak, the radio operator suffers a wound to his leg, his set is put out of action and a hit to the port engine means that the aircraft can barely hold altitude. Dixon's crew in "F for Freddie" are the last aircraft to return, by which time fog covers the airfield. Tension builds as he locates the base and brings the damaged Wellington down safely, landing back at "Millerton" at 4 h 15. No aircraft are lost from the mission and the target was set ablaze, so it is considered a complete success.

== Production ==
The film was shot by the Royal Air Force Film Unit, with location filming being carried out during the last two weeks of March and the first two weeks of April 1941 at RAF Mildenhall. Aircraft used in the filming consisted of resident Vickers Wellington bombers and the crews of No. 149 Squadron which carried the squadron code "OJ". The exception to this was Pickard, who was at that time Squadron Leader with No. 311 (Czechoslovak) Squadron.

Filming also took place at RAF Bomber Command headquarters in High Wycombe, with the head of Bomber Command Sir Richard Peirse and Senior Air Staff Officer Sir Robert Saundby appearing in the film, though their part was filmed on the sound stage at Denhamm, which recreated the command centre at RAF High Wycombe with an inflated number of bomber squadrons on the chalkboard to "mislead the enemy" about the strength of the Royal Air Force at that time. In order to avoid giving information to the enemy, RAF Mildenhall took the fictitious name of "Millerton Aerodrome", and several other aspects of day-to-day operations of the command were altered. Squadron Leader Dickson, who skippered "F for Freddie," was played by Percy Charles Pickard, who went on to lead Operation Biting and Operation Jericho, a raid to release prisoners from the Amiens Prison. During this mission Pickard lost his life, as did his navigator, Flight Lieutenant J. A. "Bill" Broadley. The second pilot in the film was played by Gordon Woollatt. Also appearing (and uncredited) is Constance Babington Smith, who was a serving WAAF officer at the time and was responsible for photographic interpretation of aerial reconnaissance pictures. Appearing in the control room scene is motor racing driver John Cobb, then a serving RAF officer.

== Film brochure ==
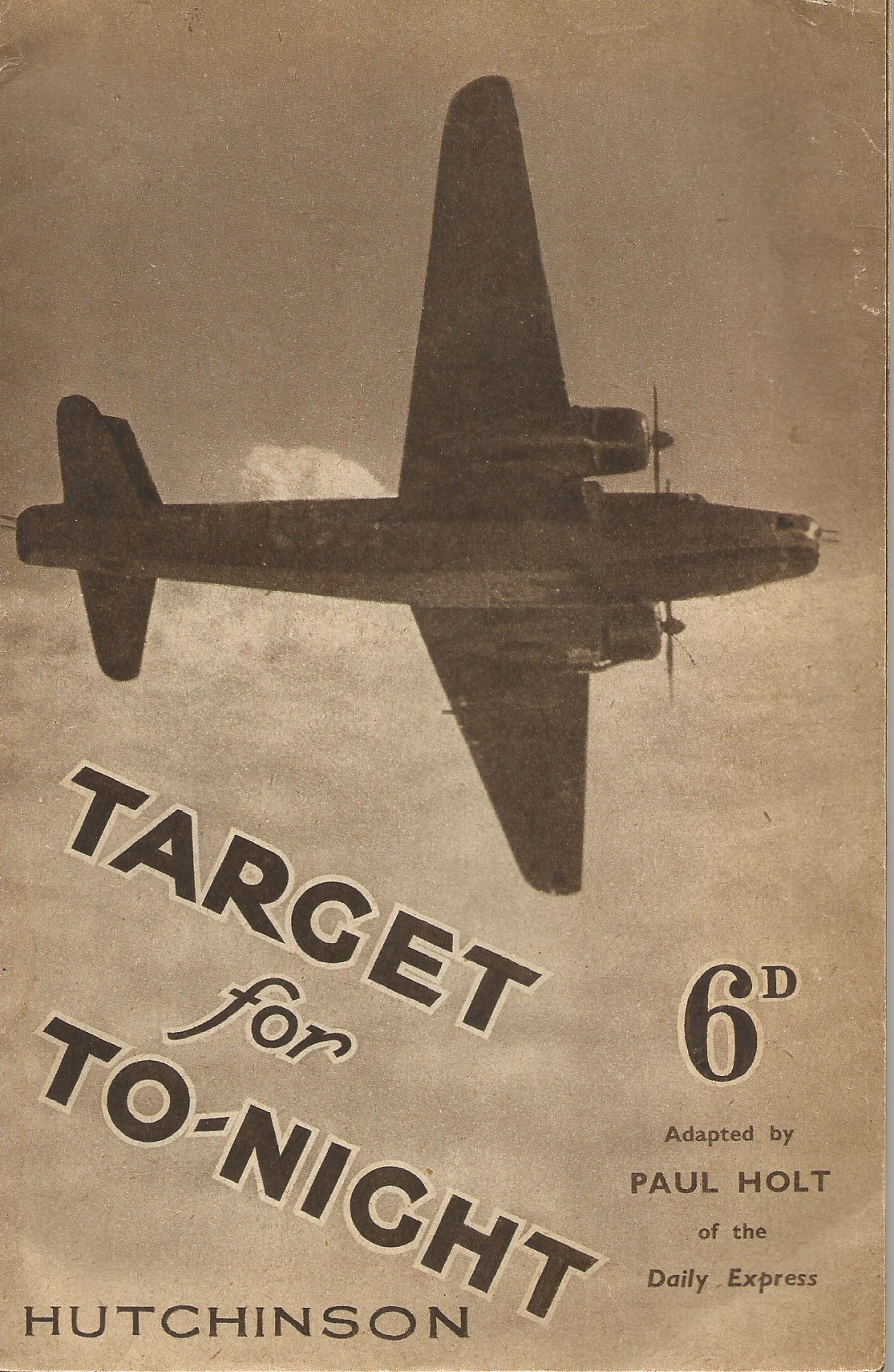
A 30-page pamphlet with photos and text from the 1941 propaganda film "Target for To-Night".

A 30-page brochure entitled The Book of the famous film Target for To-Night and sub-titled The Record in Text and Pictures of a Bombing Raid on Germany was released in 1941. It covered various scenes from the film along with photographic stills and was sold for 6d (six old pence). It was adapted from Harry Watt's screenplay by Paul Holt of the Daily Express.

== Reception ==
According to Warner Bros. the film earned that studio $229,000 domestically and $18,000 foreign.

== Popular culture ==
A possible identity of "F for Freddie" is Wellington Mk 1c OJ-F ("P2517") which was serving with No. 149 Squadron from November 1940 to September 1941.

At the end of the war Harry Watt, the film's director, noted with regret that most of the flight officers and crew who appeared in the film did not survive the duration of the war. For example, the front gunner in the film was played by Flight-sergeant Joseph Ronald Bird who lost his life on the 27/28 August 1942 flying as rear gunner of a Short Stirling aircraft whilst on a bombing mission to Kassel, Germany.

=== "Allo Allo!" ===
The January 1987 episode of 'Allo 'Allo!, "Pretty Maids All In A Row", contains a scene where the rescue of two British airmen by plane is hampered by the fact that all spare British aircraft are currently being used for a movie named F For Freddie.

=== The World at War ===
Scenes from the film were included in the British World War II documentary The World at War, in the episode "Whirlwind".

=== The Winds of War ===
==== Novel ====
Herman Wouk, in his novel The Winds of War, included a Wellington bomber coded F-OJ and christened "F for Freddie" in an episode of the story. The lead character, American naval captain Victor 'Pug' Henry, flies onboard "F for Freddie" as an observer during a bombing mission over Berlin. Wouk's fictional narrative evokes portions of the real "F for Freddie"'s mission log: one of their bombs hits their target squarely and flak damages the plane and injures one of their crew members in the leg (in the novel, the rear gunner rather than the radio operator). They have trouble holding altitude but make it back after a long, tense flight over hostile territory.

==== Miniseries ====
Additionally in episode 4 of the 1983 miniseries, The Winds of War, 'Pug' Henry joins the crew at their operational briefing, where he is introduced to the Wellington's crew members (however the names of each differ from those used in the documentary film being; Flt. Lt. Killian (pilot), Sgt. Johnson (second pilot), Sgt. Reynolds (navigator/bomb aimer), Sgt. Peters (wireless operator) Sgt. Carter (front gunner), Sgt. Baden (rear gunner)). Prior to take off for the target, "F for Freddie's" navigator, Reynolds, states that; "conditions should be the same skipper as our op to Freihausen" (the fictional target in the Black Forest used in the documentary film).

=== Commando Comics ===
Commando Comics issue #977 "O-For-Orange" possibly involves a reference to Target For Tonight with the crew of the titular aircraft and the aircraft itself, a Wellington, becoming famous after starring in a propaganda film.
