= Pat Jackson =

English film director (1916–2011)

Patrick Douglas Selmes Jackson (26 March 1916 – 3 June 2011) was an English film and television director.

== Biography ==
Born in Eltham to a formerly affluent family which was severely affected by the Wall Street crash in 1929, Jackson's formal education was ended by his father's long-term illness and early death. He joined the GPO Film Unit on his 17th birthday as a messenger boy after his mother persuaded her MP, Sir Kingsley Wood, then also postmaster general, to find work for her son. Rising to production assistant, he was part of the crew for the short film Night Mail (1936). The voice narrating the poem by W.H. Auden ("This is the Night Mail crossing the border, bringing the cheque and the postal order.") was Jackson himself. He directed a number of documentaries, the first being The Horsey Mail (1938) about the rural postal service in Suffolk. The First Days (1939), co-directed by Harry Watt and Humphrey Jennings, was the first of the wartime documentaries, in this instance concerned with the 'Phoney War' period.

Jackson's debut feature film was Western Approaches (1944), a semi-documentary war film for what was now the Ministry of Information's Crown Film Unit. For what became a three-year project, Jackson took on the writing, direction, editing and casting (of non-professional actors) a film about merchant seamen. Featuring an extended period on location at sea, the lifeboat sequences alone took six-months to complete.

After the war, Jackson spent three years in Hollywood under contract to MGM, although the only film he directed during this period was Shadow on the Wall (1950), based on the novel Death in the Doll's House by Lawrence P. Bachmann and Hannah Leessuch. His film Encore (1951) was in competition at the 1952 Cannes Film Festival . White Corridors (1951), a semi-documentary drama about a hospital in the regions, was critically well received at the time. What a Carve Up! (1961), a film in the old dark house genre, was the most commercially successful of Jackson's later feature films.

Jackson worked in television during the 1960s and 1970s. Impressed by the stage work of Patrick McGoohan, he seems to have been involved in casting him for Danger Man (US:Secret Agent), episodes of which he directed. Apart from McGoohan's The Prisoner (1967), he was also involved with episodes of The Saint and The Professionals.

Jackson died on 3 June 2011 aged 95.

== Films and television series ==
- Western Approaches (documentary feature, 1944)
- Shadow on the Wall (1950)
- White Corridors (1951)
- Encore! (1951)
- The Feminine Touch (1956)
- The Birthday Present (1957)
- Virgin Island (US Our Virgin Island, 1958)
- Snowball (1960)
- Seven Keys (1961)
- What a Carve Up! (1961)
- Don't Talk to Strange Men (1962)
- Seventy Deadly Pills (1964)
- The Prisoner (4 episodes; 1967–1968)
- The Famous Five (2 episodes; 1978)
