= Crown Film Unit =

British government film unit

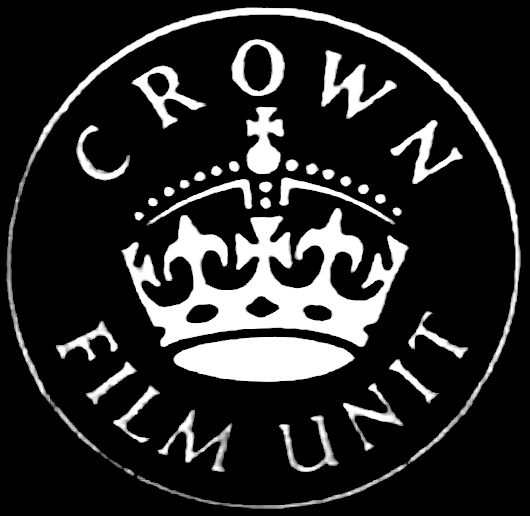
Logo of the “Crown Film Unit”

The Crown Film Unit was an organisation within the British Government's Ministry of Information during the Second World War; until 1940, it was the GPO Film Unit. Its remit was to make films for the general public in Britain and abroad. Its output included short information and documentary films, as well as longer drama-documentaries, as well as a few straight drama productions.

Music was an important element. The conductor Muir Mathieson was the director of music for many productions, and notable composers commissioned to write original scores included Walter Leigh, Benjamin Britten, Ernst Meyer, Richard Addinsell, Benjamin Frankel, Christian Darnton, Guy Warrack and Arthur Benjamin.

The Crown Film Unit continued to produce films, as part of the Central Office of Information (COI), until it was disbanded in 1952.

== Notable productions ==
The True Story of Lili Marlene (1944), directed by Humphrey Jennings

Title	Year	Notes
Royal Scotland	1952	Oscar-nominated documentary
Mary's Birthday	1951	Animation by Lotte Reiniger
Out of True	1951	Directed by Philip Leacock
Daybreak in Udi	1949	Directed by Terry Bishop, Oscar-winning documentary
School in Cologne	1948	Directed by Graham Wallace, short film in the British occupation zone in Germany
Worth the Risk?	1948	British road safety public information film
Instruments of the Orchestra	1946	Scored by Benjamin Britten, later published as The Young Person's Guide to the Orchestra
A Defeated People	1946	Directed by Humphrey Jennings, filmed in Occupied Germany
A Diary for Timothy	1945	Directed by Humphrey Jennings, written by E. M. Forster, featuring Michael Redgrave, Dame Myra Hess and John Gielgud
Two Fathers	1944	Directed by Anthony Asquith, written by V. S. Pritchett, starring Bernard Miles and Paul Bonifas
Western Approaches	1944	Docufiction directed by Pat Jackson, Crown Film Unit's first Technicolor production
The Silent Village	1943	Directed by Humphrey Jennings
Before the Raid	1943	Directed by Jirí Weiss, written by Laurie Lee
Fires Were Started	1943	Directed by Humphrey Jennings
The True Story of Lili Marlene	1944	Directed by Humphrey Jennings, featuring Marius Goring and Lucie Mannheim
Coastal Command	1942	Directed by J.B. Holmes
A Letter From Ulster	1942	Directed by Brian Desmond Hurst
Listen to Britain	1942	Directed by Humphrey Jennings, featuring Dame Myra Hess and Flanagan and Allen
Malta G.C.	1942	Directed by Eugeniusz Cekalski and Derrick De Marney, narrated by Laurence Olivier
Target for Tonight	1941	Directed by Harry Watt, winner of Special Award Certificate from AMPAS
The Heart of Britain (also known as This Is England)	1941	Directed by Humphrey Jennings, narrated by Edward R. Murrow
Men of the Lightship	1940	Directed by David MacDonald
Musical Poster Number One	1940	Written and directed by Len Lye
