= List of English Heritage blue plaques in the City of Westminster =

This is a complete list of the 336 blue plaques placed by English Heritage and its predecessors in the City of Westminster in London.

== List ==
| Subject | Inscription | Location | Year installed | Photo | Open Plaques ref | Notes |
|---|---|---|---|---|---|---|
| 1–3 Robert Street | "ROBERT ADAM THOMAS HOOD JOHN GALSWORTHY SIR JAMES BARRIE AND OTHER EMINENT ARTISTS AND WRITERS LIVED HERE" | 1–3 Robert Street, Adelphi; Charing Cross WC2N 6BN | 1950 | | 509 | |
| 8 Russell Street | "In this house occupied by THOMAS DAVIES Bookseller DR. SAMUEL JOHNSON first met JAMES BOSWELL in 1763" | 8 Russell Street; Covent Garden WC2B 5HZ | 1984 | | 9172 | |
| 14 Buckingham Street | "In a House formerly standing on this site lived SAMUEL PEPYS 1633–1703 Diarist & ROBERT HARLEY Earl of Oxford 1661–1724 Statesman And in this House lived WILLIAM ETTY 1787–1849 Painter & CLARKSON STANFIELD 1793–1867 Painter" | 14 Buckingham Street; Covent Garden WC2N 6DF | 1908 | | 164 | |
| 32 Soho Square | "SIR JOSEPH BANKS 1743–1820 PRESIDENT OF THE ROYAL SOCIETY ROBERT BROWN 1773–1858 AND DAVID DON 1800–1841 BOTANISTS LIVED IN A HOUSE ON THIS SITE THE LINNEAN SOCIETY MET HERE 1821–1857" | 32 Soho Square; Soho W1D 3AP | 1938 | | 152 | |
| The Adelphi | "THE ADELPHI THIS BUILDING STANDS ON THE SITE OF ADELPHI TERRACE BUILT BY THE BROTHERS ADAM IN 1768–1774. AMONG THE OCCUPANTS OF THE TERRACE WERE TOPHAM AND LADY DIANA BEAUCLERK, DAVID GARRICK, RICHARD D'OYLY CARTE, THOMAS HARDY & GEORGE BERNARD SHAW. THE LONDON SCHOOL OF ECONOMICS AND POLITICAL SCIENCE AND THE SAVAGE CLUB ALSO HAD THEIR PREMISES HERE" | The Adelphi Terrace; Charing Cross WC2N 6BJ | 1952 | | 600 | |
| Sir Lawrence Alma-Tadema O.M. (1836–1912) | "Painter lived here 1886–1912" | 44 Grove End Road; St John's Wood NW8 9NE | 1975 | | 569 | |
| Bert Ambrose (c.1896–1971) | "Dance Band Leader lived and played here 1927–1940" | May Fair Hotel, Stratton Street; Mayfair W1J 8LT | 2005 | | 597 | |
| Edward Ardizzone (1900–1979) | "Artist and Illustrator lived here 1920–1972" | 130 Elgin Avenue; Maida Vale W9 2NS | 2007 | | 104 | |
| Sir Richard Arkwright (1732–1792) | "Industrialist and Inventor lived here" | 8 Adam Street; Charing Cross WC2N 6AA | 1984 | | 241 | |
| Thomas Arne (1710–1778) | "Composer lived here" | 31 King Street; Covent Garden WC2E 8JD | 1988 | | 233 | The left and right sides of the circular plaque have been removed to fit into a narrow space. |
| Matthew Arnold (1822–1888) | "POET and CRITIC lived here" | 2 Chester Square; Belgravia SW1W 9HH | 1954 | | 38 | |
| Herbert Henry Asquith, 1st Earl of Oxford and Asquith (1852–1928) | "STATESMAN lived here" | 20 Cavendish Square; Marylebone W1G 0RN | 1951 | | 601 | |
| Nancy Astor (1879–1964) | "First woman to sit in Parliament lived here" | 4 St James's Square; St James's SW1Y 4JU | | | 200 | |
| Winifred Atwell (d.1983) | " Pianist, entertainer and entrepreneur lived here" | 18 Bourdon Street; Mayfair W1K 3PJ | 2025 | | 78406 | |
| Hertha Ayrton (1854–1923) | "Physicist lived here 1903–1923" | 41 Norfolk Square; Paddington W2 1RX | 2007 | | 712 | |
| Walter Bagehot (1826–1877) | "Writer, Banker and Economist lived here" | 12 Upper Belgrave Street; Belgravia SW1X 8BA | 1967 | | 215 | |
| John Logie Baird (1888–1946) | "IN 1926 IN THIS HOUSE JOHN LOGIE BAIRD 1888–1946 FIRST DEMONSTRATED TELEVISION" | 22 Frith Street; Soho W1D 4RP | | | 444 | Baird's home at 3 Crescent Wood Road in Sydenham in the London Borough of Southwark also has a blue plaque. |
| Bruce Bairnsfather (1888–1959) | "Cartoonist lived here" | 1 Sterling Street, off Montpelier Square; Knightsbridge SW7 1HN | 1981 | | 584 | |
| Stanley Baldwin, 1st Earl Baldwin of Bewdley (1867–1947) | "PRIME MINISTER lived here" | 93 Eaton Square; Belgravia SW1W 9AQ | 1969 | | 40 | |
| Michael William Balfe (1808–1870) | "Musical Composer Lived here" | 12 Seymour Street; Marylebone W1H 7HT | 1912 | | 11 | |
| Evelyn Baring, 1st Earl of Cromer (1841–1917) | "Colonial administrator lived and died here" | 36 Wimpole Street; Marylebone W1G 8GZ | | | 440 | |
| Elizabeth Barrett Browning (1806–1861) | "ELIZABETH BARRETT BARRETT POETESS, AFTERWARDS WIFE OF ROBERT BROWNING, LIVED HERE 1838–1846" | 50 Wimpole Street; Marylebone W1G 8SQ | 1899 | | 368 | The London County Council re-erected the plaque in 1936. |
| Sir James Barrie (1860–1937) | "NOVELIST AND DRAMATIST lived here" | 100 Bayswater Road; Bayswater W2 3HJ | 1961 | | 416 | |
| George Basevi (1794–1845) | "ARCHITECT lived here" | 17 Savile Row; Mayfair W1S 3PN | 1949 | | 291 | |
| Gilbert Bayes (1872–1953) | Sculptor lived here 1931–1953 | 4 Greville Place; St John's Wood NW6 5JN | 2007 | | 10 | |
| Sir Joseph Bazalgette (1819–1891) | "Civil Engineer lived here" | 17 Hamilton Terrace; St John's Wood NW8 9RE | 1974 | | 385 | |
| Aubrey Beardsley (1872–1898) | "ARTIST lived here" | 114 Cambridge Street; Pimlico SW1V 4QF | 1948 | | 456 | |
| Sir Francis Beaufort (1774–1857) | "Admiral and Hydrographer lived here" | 52 Manchester Street; Marylebone W1U 7LU | 1959 | | 686 | |
| Diana Beck (1800–1956) | "Neurosurgeon lived and worked here 1948-1955" | 53 Wimpole Street; Marylebone W1G 8YH | 2024 | | 65973 | |
| Sir Thomas Beecham C. H. (1879–1961) | "Conductor and Impresario lived here" | 31 Grove End Road; St John's Wood NW8 9NG | 1985 | | 443 | |
| David Ben-Gurion (1886–1973) | "First Prime-Minister of Israel lived here" | 75 Warrington Crescent; Maida Vale W9 1EH | 1986 | | 12 | |
| Sir Julius Benedict (1804–1885) | "MUSICAL COMPOSER Lived and died here" | 2 Manchester Square; Marylebone W1U 3PA | 1934 | | 561 | |
| Sir William Sterndale Bennett (1816–1875) | "Composer lived here" | 38 Queensborough Terrace; Bayswater W2 3SH | 1996 | | 499 | |
| George Bentham (1800–1884) | "Botanist lived here 1864–1884" | 25 Wilton Place; Belgravia SW1X 8RL | 1978 | | 67 | |
| Hector Berlioz (1803–1869) | "COMPOSER stayed here in 1851" | 58 Queen Anne Street; Marylebone W1M 9LA | 1969 | | 542 | |
| Ernest Bevin (1881–1951) | "Trade Union Leader and Statesman lived here in flat No.8 1931–1939" | Stratford Mansions, 34 South Molton Street; Mayfair W1Y 1HA | 2001 | | 145 | |
| Wilfrid Scawen Blunt (1840–1922) | "Diplomat Poet and Traveller Founder of Crabbet Park Arabian Stud lived here" | 15 Buckingham Gate; St James's SW1E 6LB | 1979 | | 346 | |
| George Frederick Bodley (1827–1907) | "Architect lived here 1862–1873" | 109 Harley Street; Marylebone W1T 6AN | 2003 | | 696 | |
| Marc Bolan (Mark Feld) (1947-1977) | "Songwriter and Musician lived here" | 31 Clarendon Gardens; Maida Vale W9 1AZ | 2025 | | 78407 | |
| Simón Bolívar (1783–1830) | "Liberator of Latin America lodged here in 1810" | 4 Duke Street; Marylebone W1U 3EL | 2002 | | 3 | |
| Violet Bonham Carter (1887–1969) | "Baroness Asquith of Yarnbury Politician and writer lived here" | 43 Gloucester Square; Paddington W2 2TQ | 1994 | | 451 | |
| James Boswell (1740–1795) | "BIOGRAPHER Lived and died in a house on this site" | 122 Great Portland Street; Fitzrovia W1W 6PW | 1936 | | 370 | |
| Bow Street | "BOW STREET WAS FORMED ABOUT 1637. IT HAS BEEN THE RESIDENCE OF MANY NOTABLE MEN AMONG WHOM WERE HENRY FIELDING (NOVELIST). SIR JOHN FIELDING (MAGISTRATE). GRINLING GIBBONS (WOODCARVER). CHARLES MACKLIN (ACTOR). JOHN RADCLIFFE (PHYSICIAN). CHARLES SACKVILLE EARL OF DORSET (POET). WILLIAM WYCHERLEY (DRAMATIST)." | 19–20 Bow Street; Covent Garden WC2E 7AW | 1929 | | 704 | |
| Elizabeth Bowen (1899–1973) | "Writer lived here 1935–1952" | 1–7 Clarence Terrace; Regent's Park NW1 4RD | 2012 | | 10672 | |
| Al Bowlly (1899–1941) | "Singer lived here 1933–1934" | Charing Cross Mansions, 26 Charing Cross Road; Charing Cross WC2H 0DG | 2013 | | 30419 | |
| Charles Bridgeman | "Landscape Gardener lived here 1723–1738" | 54 Broadwick Street; Soho W1F 7AH | 1984 | | 586 | |
| Richard Bright (1789–1858) | "Physician lived here" | 11 Savile Row; Mayfair W1S 3PS | 1979 | | 85 | |
| Sir Charles Vyner Brooke (1874–1963) | "last Rajah of Sarawak lived here" | 13 Albion Street; Paddington W2 2AS | 1983 | | 359 | |
| Elizabeth Barrett Browning (1806–1861) | POET LIVED HERE | 99 Gloucester Place; Marylebone W1U 6JQ | 1924 | | 45 | |
| Elizabeth Barrett Browning (1806–1861) | Poet lived in a house on this site 1838–1846 | 50 Wimpole Street; Marylebone W1G 8SQ | 1936 | | 368 | Street level supplementary stone inscription added by the LCC to the facade of 50 Wimpole Street when the brown RSA plaque of 1899 was re-erected in 1936 |
| Beau Brummell (1778–1840) | "Leader of Fashion lived here" | 4 Chesterfield Street; Mayfair W1J 6JF | 1984 | | 22 | |
| General John Burgoyne (1723–1792) | "lived and died here" | 10 Hertford Street; Mayfair W1J 7RL | 1954 | | 678 | A second blue plaque on the building commemorates Richard Brinsley Sheridan. |
| Edmund Burke (1729–1797) | AUTHOR AND STATESMAN LIVED HERE | 37 Gerrard Street; Leicester Square W1D 5QB | 1876 | | 424 | |
| Frances Hodgson Burnett (1849–1924) | "WRITER lived here" | 63 Portland Place; Marylebone W1B 1QP | 1979 | | 242 | |
| Fanny Burney (1752–1840) | "MADAME D'ARBLAY (FANNY BURNEY) AUTHORESS. LIVED HERE. BORN 1752. DIED 1840." | 11 Bolton Street; Mayfair W1J 8BB | 1885 | | 74 | |
| Colen Campbell (1676–1729) | "Architect and Author of Vitruvius Britannicus lived and died here" | 76 Brook Street; Mayfair W1K 5EF | 1977 | | 343 | |
| Sir Henry Campbell-Bannerman (1836–1908) | "Prime Minister lived here" | 6 Grosvenor Place; Belgravia SW1X 7SH | 1959 | | 481 | |
| Giovanni Antonio Canal (1697–1768) | "Antonio Canal called Canaletto (1697–1768) Venetian Painter Lived here" | 41 Beak Street; Soho W1F 9SB | 1925 | | 378 | |
| George Canning (1770–1827) | "Statesman lived here" | 50 Berkeley Square; Mayfair W1J 5BA | 1979 | | 477 | |
| Cato Street conspiracy | "discovered here 23 February 1820" | 1a Cato Street; Marylebone W1H 5HG | 1977 | | 84 | |
| Sir George Cayley (1773–1857) | "SCIENTIST and PIONEER of AVIATION lived here" | 20 Hertford Street; Mayfair W1J 7RX | 1962 | | 237 | |
| Robert Gascoyne-Cecil, Viscount Cecil of Chelwood (1864–1958) | "Creator of the League of Nations lived here" | 16 South Eaton Place; Belgravia SW1W 9JA | 1976 | | 304 | A second blue plaque on the building commemorates Philip Noel-Baker. |
| Neville Chamberlain (1869–1940) | "Prime Minister lived here" | 37 Eaton Square; Belgravia SW1W 9DH | 1962 | | 413 | |
| King Charles X (1757–1836) | "last Bourbon King of France lived here 1805–1814" | 72 South Audley Street; Mayfair W1K 1JB | 2000 | | 679 | |
| Thomas Chippendale (1718–1813) | "The workshop of THOMAS CHIPPENDALE and his son, cabinet makers, stood near this site 1753–1813" | 61 St Martin's Lane; Covent Garden WC2N 4JS | 1952 | | 463 | |
| Frederic Chopin (1810–1849) | "From this house in 1848 FREDERIC CHOPIN 1810–1849 went to Guildhall to give his last public performance" | 4 St James's Place; St James's SW1A 1NP | 1981 | | 297 | |
| Lord Randolph Churchill (1849–1895) | "STATESMAN lived here 1883–1892" | 2 Connaught Place; Marble Arch W2 2ET | 1962 | | 269 | In 1985 the plaque was resituated by the Greater London Council following alterations to the building. |
| Sir Kenneth Clark (1903–1983) | "Art historian and broadcaster" | 30 Portland Place; Marylebone W1B 1LZ | 2021 | | 55642 | |
| Brigadier Dudley Clarke (1899-1974) | "Master of military deception lived here on the first floor 1961-1970" | 35 Rutland Gate; Knightsbridge SW7 1PD | 2026 | | 94883 | |
| Willy Clarkson (1861–1934) | "THEATRICAL WIGMAKER lived and died here" | 41–43 Wardour Street; Soho W1D 6PY | 1966 | | 154 | |
| Lord Robert Clive (1725–1744) | "SOLDIER AND ADMINISTRATOR lived here" | 45 Berkeley Square; Mayfair W1J 5AS | 1953 | | 50 | |
| Eric Coates (1886–1957) | "Composer lived here in Flat 176 1930–1939" | Chiltern Court, Baker Street; Marylebone NW1 5SG | 2013 | | 33147 | |
| Richard Cobden (1804–1865) | "Died Here" | 23 Suffolk Street; Leicester Square SW1Y 4HG | 1905 | | 122 | |
| Thomas Cochrane, Earl of Dundonald and David Beatty, Earl Beatty O. M. (1775–1860) and (1871–1936) | "Here lived THOMAS COCHRANE Earl of Dundonald 1775–1860 and later DAVID, EARL BEATTY, O.M. 1871–1936 Admirals" | Hanover Lodge, Outer Circle; Regent's Park NW1 4RJ | 1974 | | 594 | |
| Samuel Taylor Coleridge (1772–1834) | "POET AND PHILOSOPHER lived in a house on this site 1812–1813" | 71 Berners Street; Soho W1T 3NL | 1966 | | 272 | The present plaque replaces a brown London County Council plaque erected in 1905. |
| William Wilkie Collins (1824–1889) | "NOVELIST lived here" | 65 Gloucester Place; Marylebone W1U 8JL | 1951 | | 107 | |
| Joseph Conrad (1857–1924) | "Novelist lived here" | 17 Gillingham Street; Victoria SW1V 1HN | 1984 | | 209 | |
| Emma Cons (1837–1912) | "Philanthropist and founder of the Old Vic lived and worked here" | 136 Seymour Place; Marylebone W1H 1NT | 1978 | | 158 | |
| Sir Michael Costa (1808–1883) | "Conductor and Orchestra Reformer lived here 1857–1883" | Wilton Court, 59 Eccleston Square; Pimlico SW1V 1PH | 2007 | | 9175 | |
| Tom Cribb (1781–1848) | "Bare Knuckle Boxing Champion lived here" | 36 Panton Street; Leicester Square SW1Y 4EA | 2005 | | 6326 | |
| Thomas Cubitt (1788–1855) | "Master Builder lived here" | 3 Lyall Street; Belgravia SW1X 8DW | 1959 | | 5028 | |
| Ottobah Cugoano (c.1757-c1791) | "Author and anti-slavery campaigner lived and worked in Schomburg House 1784–1791" | Schomberg House, 80–82 Pall Mall; St James's SW1Y 5HF | 2020 | | 54386 | |
| George Nathaniel Curzon, Marquess Curzon of Kedleston (1859–1925) | "Statesman Viceroy of India lived and died here" | 1 Carlton House Terrace; St James's SW1Y 5AF | 1976 | | 6258 | |
| Richard Dadd (1817–1866) | "Painter lived here" | 15 Suffolk Street; Leicester Square SW1Y 4HG | 1977 | | 331 | The plaque was originally incorrectly placed next door, at 15 Suffolk Street, in 1977. The address was found to be incorrect, and it was moved to its present location in 1980. |
| Emily Davies (1830–1921) | "Founder of Girton College, Cambridge lived here" | 17 Cunningham Place; Lisson Grove NW8 8JT | 1978 | | 53 | |
| General Charles De Gaulle (1890–1970) | "President of the French National Committee set up the Headquarters of the Free French Forces here in 1940" | 4 Carlton Gardens; St James's SW1Y 5AA | 1984 | | 550 | |
| Thomas de Quincey (1785–1859) | "wrote Confessions of an English Opium Eater in this house" | 36 Tavistock Street; Covent Garden WC2E 7PB | 1981 | | 9 | De Quincey's surname is spelt incorrectly by the plaque. |
| Benjamin Disraeli, Earl of Beaconsfield (1804–1881) | "BENJAMIN DISRAELI Earl of Beaconsfield Statesman 1804–1881 Died Here" | 19 Curzon Street; Mayfair W1J 7TB | 1908 | | 453 | |
| John Dryden (1631–1700) | "POET. LIVED HERE" | 43 Gerrard Street; Soho W1D 5QG | 1870 | | 526 | |
| Sir Stewart Duke-Elder (1898–1978) | "Ophthalmologist lived and worked here 1934–1976" | 63 Harley Street; Marylebone W1G 9PW | 2002 | | 322 | |
| Essex Street | "ESSEX STREET was laid out in the grounds of Essex House by NICHOLAS BARBON in 1675 Among many famous lawyers who lived here were Sir ORLANDO BRIDGEMAN c.1606–1674 Lord Keeper HENRY FIELDING 1707–1754 Novelist and BRASS CROSBY 1725–1793 Lord Mayor of London JAMES SAVAGE 1779–1852 Architect had his office here. PRINCE CHARLES EDWARD STUART stayed at a house in the street in 1750. Rev. THEOPHILUS LINDSEY 1723–1808 Unitarian Minister founded Essex Street Chapel here in 1774. Dr. SAMUEL JOHNSON established an evening club at the Essex Head in 1783" | Essex Hall, Essex Street; Strand WC2R 3HU | 1962 | | 625 | The stone plaque was re-erected in 1964. |
| Dame Edith Evans (1888–1976) | "Actress lived here" | 109 Ebury Street; Belgravia SW1W 9QU | 1997 | | 220 | |
| William Ewart (1798–1869) | "REFORMER lived here" | 16 Eaton Place; Belgravia SW1X 8LT | 1963 | | 298 | The plaque was originally located at 6 Cambridge Square and placed here in 1963 when that building was demolished. |
| Michael Faraday (1791–1867) | "MAN OF SCIENCE. APPRENTICE HERE." | 48 Blandford Street; Marylebone W1U 7HU | 1876 | | 19 | |
| Ethel Gordon Fenwick (1857–1947) | "Nursing Reformer lived here 1887–1924" | 20 Upper Wimpole Street; Marylebone W1G 6LZ | 1999 | | 73 | |
| Ronald Firbank (1886–1926) | "Novelist lived here" | 33 Curzon Street; Mayfair W1J 7TR | 2023 | | 73 | |
| Admiral of the Fleet Lord Fisher (1841–1920) | "Admiral of the Fleet LORD FISHER 1841–1920 lived here as First Sea Lord 1904–1910" | 16 Queen Anne's Gate; Westminster SW1H 9AA | 1975 | | 130 | A second blue plaque on the building commemorates William Smith. |
| Ian Fleming (1908–1964) | "Creator of James Bond lived here" | 22 Ebury Street; Belgravia SW1W 8LW | 1996 | | 395 | |
| Sir Ambrose Fleming 1849–1945 | "Scientist and Electrical Engineer lived here" | 9 Clifton Gardens; Maida Vale W9 1AL | 1971 | | 506 | |
| Dame Margot Fonteyn 1919–1991 | "Prima Ballerina Assoluta lived here in Flat 9" | 118 Long Acre; Covent Garden WC2E 9PA | 2016 | | 41422 | |
| Charles James Fox 1749–1806 | Statesman Lived Here | 46 Clarges Street; Mayfair W1J 7ER | 1912 | | 402 | The plaque was placed here in the 1940s after its original location, 9 Arlington Street, was demolished. |
| George Frampton 1860–1928 | "Sculptor lived and worked here 1894–1908" | 32 Queen's Grove; St John's Wood NW8 6HJ | 1977 | | 647 | |
| Sir Edward Frankland 1825–1899 | "Chemical Scientist lived here 1870–1880" | 14 Lancaster Gate; Bayswater W2 3LH | 2019 | | 51829 | |
| Benjamin Franklin 1706–1790 | "LIVED HERE" | 36 Craven Street; Charing Cross WC2N 5NF | 1914 | | 348 | |
| W. P. Frith 1819–1909 | "Painter lived and died here" | 114 Clifton Hill; St John's Wood NW8 0JS | 1973 | | 46 | |
| Henry Fuseli (1741–1825) | "Artist lived here 1788–1803" | 37 Foley Street; Fitzrovia W1W 7TN | 1961 | | 308 | |
| Thomas Gage (1721–1787) | "Commander of British Forces in North America lived here" | 41 Portland Place; Marylebone W1B 1BN | 1996 | | 316 | |
| Thomas Gainsborough (1727–1788) | "ARTIST lived here" | Schomberg House, 82 Pall Mall; St James's SW1Y 5ES | 1951 | | 2 | This plaque replaces a Royal Society of Arts plaque from 1881. |
| Sir Francis Galton (1822–1911) | "EXPLORER STATISTICIAN FOUNDER OF EUGENICS LIVED HERE FOR FIFTY YEARS" | 42 Rutland Gate; Knightsbridge SW7 1PD | | | 356 | This plaque was privately erected c. 1931, and became part of London County Council's blue plaque scheme in 1959. |
| Ava Gardner (1922–1990) | "Film Star lived and died here" | 34 Ennismore Gardens; Knightsbridge SW7 1AE | 2016 | | 41595 | |
| Elizabeth Garrett Anderson (1836–1917) | "The first woman to qualify as a Doctor in Britain lived here" | 20 Upper Berkeley Street; Marylebone W1H 7PF | 1962 | | 139 | |
| Edward Gibbon (1737–1792) | "HISTORIAN lived in a house on this site 1773–1783" | 7 Bentinck Street; Marylebone W1U 2EH | 1964 | | 107 | The plaque replaces a Royal Society of Arts plaque from 1896. |
| Guy Gibson (1918–1944) | "Pilot Leader of the Dambusters Raid lived here" | 32 Aberdeen Place; St John's Wood NW8 8JR | 2006 | | 445 | |
| Sir John Gielgud (1904–2000) | "Actor and Director lived here 1945–1976" | 16 Cowley Street; Westminster SW1P 3LZ | 2017 | | 42718 | |
| William Ewart Gladstone (1809–1898) | "Statesman Lived here" | 11 Carlton House Terrace; St James's SW1Y 5AJ | 1925 | | 118 | |
| John Robert Godley (1814–1861) | "FOUNDER OF CANTERBURY NEW ZEALAND lived and died here" | 48 Gloucester Place; Marylebone W1U 8HG | 1951 | | 9147 | |
| Sir Laurence Gomme (1853–1916) | "Clerk to the London County Council Folklorist and Historian lived here 1895–1909" | 24 Dorset Square; Marylebone NW1 6QG | 2006 | | 2238 | |
| Henry Gray (1827–1861) | "ANATOMIST lived here" | 8 Wilton Street; Belgravia SW1X 7AF | 1947 | | 4320 | |
| John Richard Green (1837–1883) | "HISTORIAN lived in a house on this site 1869–1876" | 4 Beaumont Street; Marylebone W1G 6AA | 1964 | | 3104 | Though originally placed in 1909, the plaque was re-erected in 1924 and 1964; after the houses demolition and damage to the plaque respectively. |
| Viscount Grey of Fallodon Sir Edward Grey (1862–1933) | "Foreign Secretary lived here" | 3 Queen Anne's Gate; Westminster SW1H 9BT | 1981 | | 1291 | |
| George Grossmith (1847–1912) | "ACTOR and AUTHOR lived here" | 28 Dorset Square; Marylebone NW1 6QG | 1963 | | 2246 | |
| George Grossmith, Jr. (1874–1935) | "ACTOR-MANAGER lived here" | 3 Spanish Place; Marylebone W1U 3HX | 1963 | | 2128 | A second blue plaque on the building commemorates Frederick Marryat. |
| George Grote (1794–1871) | "Historian Died Here" | 12 Savile Row; Mayfair W1S 3PS | 1905 | | 4270 | |
| Lord Haldane (1856–1928) | "STATESMAN LAWYER AND PHILOSOPHER LIVED HERE" | 28 Queen Anne's Gate; Westminster SW1H 9AB | 1954 | | 87 | |
| Henry Hallam (1777–1859) | "Historian Lived Here" | 67 Wimpole Street; Marylebone W1G 8AP | 1904 | | 388 | |
| George Frideric Handel (1685–1759) | "Composer lived in this house from 1723 and died here" | 25 Brook Street; Mayfair W1K 4HB | 2001 | More images | 337 | This is the third plaque on this house, after a Society of Arts plaque from 1870 and a London County Council plaque from 1952. |
| Tommy Handley (1892–1949) | "Radio Comedian lived here" | 34 Craven Road; Paddington W2 3QA | 1980 | | 374 | |
| Francis Bret Harte (1836–1902) | "American Writer lived and died here" | 74 Lancaster Gate; Paddington W2 3NH | 1977 | | 263 | |
| Sir Norman Hartnell (1901–1979) | "Court Dressmaker lived and worked here 1935–1979" | 26 Bruton Street; Mayfair W1J 6QL | 2005 | | 694 | |
| Benjamin Haydon (1786–1846) and Charles Rossi (1762–1839) | "BENJAMIN HAYDON 1786–1846 Painter and CHARLES ROSSI 1762–1839 Sculptor lived here" | 116 Lisson Grove; Lisson Grove NW1 6UL | 1959 | | 299 | |
| William Hazlitt (1778–1830) | "Essayist Died Here" | 6 Frith Street; Soho W1D 3JA | 1905 | | 665 | The plaque was originally coloured green, but has faded to blue. It was re-erected in 1909 after the front portion of the building was rebuilt. |
| Heinrich Heine (1799–1856) | "German Poet and Essayist (1799–1856) Lived Here 1827" | 32 Craven Street; Charing Cross, WC2N 5NP | 1912 | | 101 | |
| Barbara Hepworth (1903–1975) John Skeaping (1901–1980) | "1901–1980 Sculptors lived and worked here in 1927" | 24 St Ann's Terrace; St John's Wood, WC2N 5NP | 2020 | | 54309 | |
| Jimi Hendrix (1942–1970) | "Guitarist and Songwriter lived here 1968–1969" | 23 Brook Street; Mayfair W1K 4HA | 1997 | | 595 | |
| Audrey Hepburn (1929–1993) | "Actress lived in a flat at number 65" | 5 South Audley Street; Mayfair W1K 2QU | 2025 | | 78408 | |
| Alexander Herzen (1812–1870) | "RUSSIAN POLITICAL THINKER lived here 1860–1863" | 1 Orsett Terrace; Bayswater W2 6AH | 1970 | | 405 | |
| Octavia Hill (1838–1912) | "Housing Reformer Co-founder of The National Trust began her work here" | 2 Garbutt Place; Marylebone W1U 4DS | 1991 | | 510 | |
| Sir Rowland Hill KCB (1795–1879) | "Postal Reformer Lived Here" | 1 Orme Square; Bayswater W2 4RS | 1907 | | 80 | |
| Quintin Hogg (1845–1903) | "Founder of the Polytechnic, Regent Street lived here 1885–1898" | 5 Cavendish Square; Marylebone W1G 0PG | 1965 | | 310 | |
| Thomas Hood (1799–1845) | "Poet lived and died here" | 28 Finchley Road; St John's Wood NW8 6ES | 2001 | | 468 | The original plaque had become illegible by 1960 and was replaced by the present one. |
| Lord Hore-Belisha (1893–1957) | "Statesman lived here" | 16 Stafford Place; Victoria SW1E 6NE | 1980 | | 293 | |
| Sir Victor Horsley (1857–1916) | "Pioneer of Neurosurgery and Social Reformer lived here" | 129 Gower Street; Fitzrovia WC1E 7HU | 2016 | | 39817 | |
| David Edward Hughes (1830–1900) | "scientist and inventor of the microphone lived and worked here" | 94 Great Portland Street, Marylebone W1W 7NU | 1991 | | 549 | |
| William Hunter (1718–1783) | "THIS WAS THE HOME AND MUSEUM OF DR WILLIAM HUNTER ANATOMIST 1718–1783" | Lyric Theatre, Great Windmill Street; Soho W1V 7HA | 1952 | | 262 | |
| John Hunter (1728–1793) | "Surgeon Lived Here" | 30 Golden Square; Soho W1F 9LD | 1907 | | 281 | The plaque has been re-erected in 1931, and 2000 after successive buildings were rebuilt. |
| William Huskisson (1770–1830) | "STATESMAN lived here" | 28 St James's Place; St James's SW1A 1NR | 1962 | | 234 | |
| Sir Jonathan Hutchinson (1828–1913) | "Surgeon, Scientist, and Teacher lived here" | 15 Cavendish Square; Marylebone W1G 9DB | 1981 | | 562 | |
| Thomas Henry Huxley (1825–1895) | "Biologist Lived Here" | 38 Marlborough Place; St John's Wood NW8 0PJ | 1910 | | 560 | |
| Sir Henry Irving (1838–1905) | "ACTOR lived here 1872–1899" | 15a Grafton Street; Mayfair W1S 4ET | 1950 | | 261 | |
| Washington Irving (1783–1859) | "American Writer lived here" | 8 Argyll Street; Soho W1F 7TF | 1983 | | 425 | |
| Rufus Isaacs, 1st Marquess of Reading (1860–1935) | "Lawyer and Statesman lived and died here" | 32 Curzon Street; Mayfair W1J 7TS | 1971 | | 663 | |
| Stella Lady Reading (1894–1971) | "Founder of the Women's Voluntary Services worked at its headquarters here 1938–1966" | 41 Tothill Street; Westminster SW1H 9LQ | 2017 | | 43365 | |
| John Hughlings Jackson (1835–1911) | "PHYSICIAN lived here" | 3 Manchester Square; Marylebone W1U 3PB | 1932 | | 201 | |
| Ernest Jones (1879–1958) | "Pioneer Psychoanalyst lived here" | 19 York Terrace East; Regent's Park NW1 4PT | 1985 | | 2509 | |
| Andreas Kalvos (1792–1869) | "Greek Poet and Patriot lived here" | 182 Sutherland Avenue; Maida Vale W9 1HR | 1998 | | 289 | |
| Sir Gerald Kelly (1879–1972) | "Portrait Painter lived here 1916–1972" | 117 Gloucester Place; Marylebone W1H 3PJ | 1993 | | 436 | |
| Charles Eamer Kempe (1837–1907) | "Stained glass artist lived and worked here" | 37 Nottingham Place; Marylebone W1U 5LT | 1994 | | 512 | |
| Jomo Kenyatta (c.1894–1978) | "First President of the Republic of Kenya lived here 1933–1937" | 95 Cambridge Street; Pimlico SW1V 4PY | 2005 | | 379 | |
| Ada, Countess of Lovelace (1815–1852) | "Pioneer of Computing lived here" | 12 St James's Square; St James's SW1Y 4RB | 1992 | | 599 | |
| Rudyard Kipling (1865–1936) | "poet and story writer lived here 1889–1891" | 43 Villiers Street; Charing Cross WC2N 6NE | 1957 | | 286 | The plaque replaces a London County Council plaque from 1940. |
| Field-Marshal Earl Kitchener of Khartoum, K.G. (1850–1916) | "Lived here 1914–15" | 2 Carlton Gardens; St James's SW1Y 5AA | 1924 | | 590 | |
| Melanie Klein (1882–1960) | "Psychoanalyst and Pioneer of Child Analysis lived here" | 42 Clifton Hill; St John's Wood NW8 0QG | 1985 | | 155 | |
| Dame Laura Knight and Harold Knight (1877–1970) and (1874–1961) | "Painters lived here" | 16 Langford Place; St John's Wood NW8 | 1983 | | 567 | |
| Oskar Kokoschka (1886–1980) | "Painter lived here" | Eyre Court, Finchley Road; St John's Wood NW8 9TX | 1986 | | 697 | |
| Sir Alexander Korda (1832–1906) | "Film Producer worked here 1932–1936" | 21/22 Grosvenor Street; Mayfair W1K 4QJ | 2002 | | 248 | |
| Susan Lawrence (1871–1947) | "Social Reformer lived here" | 44 Westbourne Terrace; Paddington W2 3UH | 1987 | | 404 | |
| T. E. Lawrence (1888–1935) | "Lawrence of Arabia" lived here | 14 Barton Street; Westminster SW1P 3NE | 1966 | | 543 | |
| Vivien Leigh (1913–1967) | "Actress lived here" | 54 Eaton Square; Belgravia SW1W 9BE | 1996 | | 412 | |
| John Lennon (1940–1980) | "Musician and Songwriter lived here in 1968" | 34 Montagu Square; Marylebone W1H 2LJ | 2010 | | 1994 | |
| John Linnell (1792–1882) Camille Silvy (1834–1910) | "The house and studio of John Linnell 1792–1882 Painter later occupied by Camille Silvy 1834–1910 Photographer" | 38 Porchester Terrace, Bayswater W2 3TP | 2019 | | 51912 | |
| Lord Lister (1827–1912) | "SURGEON LIVED HERE" | 12 Park Crescent; Regent's Park W1B 1PH | 1915 | | 2501 | The plaque was removed following serious damage to Park Crescent during the Second World War. The plaque was illicitly sold for scrap, but was located thanks to an article in The Lancet and re-erected in 1966 following the rebuilding of the crescent. As of 2019 the plaque is again missing. |
| Jane Loudon (1807–1858) and John Loudon (1783–1843) | "THEIR HORTICULTURAL WORK GAVE NEW BEAUTY TO LONDON SQUARES" | 3 Porchester Terrace; Bayswater W2 3TH | 1953 | | 475 | |
| John Lubbock, 1st Baron Avebury (1834–1913) | "Born here" | 29 Eaton Place; Belgravia SW1X 8BP | 1935 | | 535 | |
| Lord Lugard (1858–1945) | "Colonial Administrator lived here 1912–1919" | 51 Rutland Gate; Knightsbridge SW7 1PL | 1972 | | 151 | |
| Sir Charles Lyell (1797–1875) and William Ewart Gladstone (1809–1898) | "In a house on this site lived from 1854–1875 SIR CHARLES LYELL Geologist and from 1876–1882 W.E. GLADSTONE Statesman" | 73 Harley Street; Marylebone W1G 8QJ | 1908 | | 294 | |
| Rose Macaulay (1881–1958) | "Writer lived and died here" | Hinde House, 11–14 Hinde Street; Marylebone W1U 3BG | 1996 | | 661 | |
| Douglas Macmillan (1884–1969) | "Founder of Macmillan Cancer Relief lived here" | 15 Ranelagh Road; Pimlico SW1V 3EX | 1997 | | 102 | |
| Harry Mallin (1892–1969) | "Policeman and Olympic Boxing Champion in 1920 and 1924 lived and worked here" | 105 Regency Street; Pimlico SW1P 4EF | 2018 | | 50073 | |
| Edmond Malone (1741–1812) | "SHAKESPEARIAN SCHOLAR lived here 1779–1812" | 40 Langham Street; Fitzrovia W1W 7AS | 1962 | | 128 | |
| Charles Manby (1804–1884) | "CIVIL ENGINEER lived here" | 60 Westbourne Terrace; Paddington W2 3UJ | 1961 | | 34 | |
| Cardinal Manning (1808–1892) | "Lived here" | 22 Carlisle Place; Victoria SW1P 1JA | 1914 | | 150 | |
| Sir Patrick Manson (1844–1922) | "Father of Modern Tropical Medicine lived here" | 50 Welbeck Street; Marylebone W1G 9XW | 1985 | | 197 | |
| Guglielmo Marconi (1874–1937) | "THE PIONEER OF WIRELESS COMMUNICATION lived here in 1896–1897" | 71 Hereford Road; Bayswater W2 5BB | 1952 | | 7 | The original plaque turned out to be defective and was replaced in 1954. |
| Captain Frederick Marryat (1792–1848) | "NOVELIST lived here" | 3 Spanish Place; Marylebone W1U 3HX | 1953 | | 252 | A second blue plaque on the building commemorates George Grossmith, Jr. |
| Karl Marx (1818–1883) | "lived here 1851–56" | 28 Dean Street; Soho W1D 3RY | 1967 | | 1105 | |
| John Masefield O. M. (1878–1967) | "Poet Laureate lived here 1907–1912" | 30 Maida Avenue; Maida Vale W2 5BB | 2002 | | 6502 | |
| William Somerset Maugham (1874–1965) | "Novelist and playwright lived here 1911–1919" | 6 Chesterfield Street; Mayfair W1J 5JQ | 1975 | | 1320 | |
| Frederick Denison Maurice (1805–1872) | "Christian Philosopher and Educationalist lived here 1862–1866" | 2 Brunswick Place; Marylebone NW1 4PN | 1977 | | 2505 | |
| Sir Robert Mayer (1879–1985) | "Philanthropist and Patron of Music lived here in flat No.31" | 2 Mansfield Street; Marylebone W1G 9NF | 1997 | | 2250 | |
| Herman Melville (1819–1891) | "Author of Moby Dick lived here in 1849" | 25 Craven Street; Charing Cross WC2N 5NT | 2005 | | 1570 | |
| Felix Mendelssohn (1809–1847) | "Composer stayed here" | 4 Hobart Place; Belgravia SW1W 0HU | 2013 | | 12090 | |
| Yehudi Menuhin (1916–1999) | "Violinist, conductor and teacher lived here" | 65 Chester Square; Westminster SW1W 9DU | 2023 | | 58910 | |
| Prince Metternich (1773–1859) | "Austrian Statesman lived here in 1848" | 44 Eaton Square; Belgravia SW1W 9BD | 1970 | | 1127 | |
| Alice Meynell (1847–1922) | "POET and ESSAYIST lived here" | 47 Palace Court; Bayswater W2 4LS | 1948 | | 9149 | |
| James Mill (1773–1836) and John Stuart Mill (1806–1873) | "Philosophers lived here 1814–1831" | 40 Queen Anne's Gate; Westminster SW1H 9AP | | | 39390 | |
| Millbank Prison (1816–1890) | "NEAR THIS SITE STOOD MILLBANK PRISON, WHICH WAS OPENED IN 1816 AND CLOSED IN 1890. THIS BUTTRESS STOOD AT THE HEAD OF THE RIVER STEPS FROM WHICH, UNTIL 1867, PRISONERS SENTENCED TO TRANSPORTATION EMBARKED ON THEIR JOURNEY TO AUSTRALIA." | Millbank; Pimlico SW1 | 1965 | | 9196 | |
| Alfred, Lord Milner (1854–1925) | "STATESMAN lived here" | 14 Manchester Square; Marylebone W1U 3PP | 1967 | | 9150 | |
| Nancy Mitford (1904–1973) | "Writer worked here 1942–1945" | 10 Curzon Street; Mayfair W1J 5HH | 1999 | | 1241 | |
| Sir Moses Montefiore (1784–1885) | "Philanthropist and Jewish Leader lived here for sixty years" | 99 Park Lane; Mayfair W1K 7TH | 1984 | | 2781 | |
| George Moore (1852–1933) | "AUTHOR Lived and died here" | 121 Ebury Street; Belgravia SW1W 9QU | 1937 | | 1128 | The original plaque from 1936 gave an incorrect year of birth and was replaced by the present one. |
| Tom Moore (1779–1852) | "POET lived here" | 85 George Street; Marylebone W1U 8NH | 1953 | | 9151 | Blue plaque originally erected in 1953 at 28 Bury Street, St James's, demolished in 1962. Plaque re-erected at 85 (formerly 44) George Street, Marylebone, London, W1U 8NH, City of Westminster in 1963. |
| Samuel Morse (1791–1872) | "American painter, and inventor of the Morse Code lived here 1812–1815" | 141 Cleveland Street; Fitzrovia W1T 6QC | 1962 | | 1293 | |
| MOUNTBATTEN, Dame Edwina (1901–1960) & MOUNTBATTEN, Louis, Earl Mountbatten of Burma (1900–1979) | "Last Viceroy and Vicereine of India lived here" | 2 Wilton Crescent; Belgravia SW1X 8RN | 2000 | | 4360 | |
| Wolfgang Amadeus Mozart (1756–1791) | "composed his first symphony here in 1764" | 180 Ebury Street; Belgravia SW1W 8UP | 1939 | | 4316 | Following damage in the Second World War the plaque was re-erected in 1951. |
| Jean Muir (1928–1995) | "Dressmaker and Fashion Designer worked here 1966-1995" | 22 Bruton Street; Mayfair W1J 6QE | 55456 | | 2893 | |
| Hector Hugh Munro alias Saki (1870–1916) | "Short Story Writer lived here" | 97 Mortimer Street; Fitzrovia W1W 7SU | 2003 | | 2893 | |
| Edward R. Murrow (1908–1965) | "American Broadcaster lived here in flat No.5 1938–1946" | Weymouth House, 84–94 Hallam Street; Fitzrovia W1W 5HF | 2006 | | 2121 | |
| Napoleon III (1808–1873) | "LIVED HERE 1848" | 1c King Street; St James's SW1Y 6QG | 1867 | | 489 | This was the second plaque placed by the scheme started by the Royal Society of the Arts and is the oldest survivor. |
| The National Union of Women's Suffrage Societies (1910–1918) | "The National Union of Women's Suffrage Societies was based here 1910-1918" | 22 Great Smith Street; Westminster SW1P 3BT | 2022 | | 57828 | |
| Horatio Nelson, 1st Viscount Nelson (1758–1805) | "NELSON LIVED HERE IN 1797. BORN 1758. FELL AT TRAFALGAR 1805" | 147 New Bond Street; Mayfair W1S 2TS | 1876 | | 587 | |
| Horatio Nelson, 1st Viscount Nelson (1758–1805) | "lived here in 1798" | 103 New Bond Street; Mayfair W1S 1ST | 1958 | | 519 | |
| Sir Isaac Newton (1642–1727) | "Lived here" | 87 Jermyn Street; St James's SW1Y 6JP | 1908 | | 651 | The plaque was re-erected in 1915 after the building was rebuilt. |
| Harold Nicolson and Vita Sackville-West (1886–1968) and (1892–1962) | "Writers and Gardeners lived here" | 182 Ebury Street; Belgravia SW1W 8UP | 1993 | | 648 | |
| Florence Nightingale (1820–1910) | "in a house on this site FLORENCE NIGHTINGALE 1820–1910 lived and died" | 10 South Street; Mayfair W1K 1DE | 1955 | | 6 | This plaque replaces a plaque erected by the Duke of Westminster in 1912 that was lost when the original house was demolished in 1929. |
| Philip Noel-Baker (1889–1982) | "Olympic Sportsman Campaigner for Peace and Disarmament lived here" | 16 South Eaton Place; Belgravia SW1W 9JA | 1992 | | 557 | A second blue plaque on the building commemorates Robert Gascoyne-Cecil, Viscount Cecil of Chelwood. |
| Joseph Nollekens (1737–1823) | "SCULPTOR lived and died in a house on this site" | 44 Mortimer Street; Fitzrovia W1W 7RJ | 1954 | | 268 | |
| Caroline Norton (1808–1877) | "Champion of women's legal rights lived here 1845–1877" | 3 Chesterfield Street; Mayfair W1J 5JF | 2021 | | 55017 | |
| Ivor Novello (1893–1951) | "Composer and Actor Manager lived and died in a flat on the top floor of this building" | 11 Aldwych; Covent Garden WC2B 4DG | 1973 | | 459 | |
| Ann Oldfield (1683–1730) | "Actress First occupant of this house 1725–1730" | 60 Grosvenor Street; Mayfair W1K 3HZ | 1992 | | 593 | |
| Sir Laurence Olivier (1907-1989) | "Actor and Director lived here as a child" | 22 Lupus Street; Pimlico SW1V 3DZ | 2026 | | 104147 | |
| Arthur Onslow (1691–1768) | "SPEAKER OF THE HOUSE OF COMMONS FROM 1728 TO 1761 LIVED IN A HOUSE ON THIS SITE" | 20 Soho Square; Soho W1D 3QW | 1927 | | 5 | The present bronze plaque replaces a stone tablet from 1912, placed by the London County Council. |
| Sir Frederick Handley Page (1885–1962) | "Aircraft designer and manufacturer lived here in Flat 3" | 18 Grosvenor Square; Mayfair W1K 6LE | 1999 | | 196 | |
| Francis Turner Palgrave (1824–1897) | "Compiler of the "Golden Treasury" lived here 1862–1875" | 5 York Gate; Regent's Park NW1 4QG | 1976 | | 650 | |
| Lord Palmerston (1784–1865) | "Statesman lived here" | 4 Carlton Gardens; St James's SW1Y 5AB | 1907 | | 706 | The plaque was placed in 1907, and reattached in 1936 after the buildings 1933 demolition. |
| Lord Palmerston (1784–1865) | "PRIME MINISTER born here" | 20 Queen Anne's Gate; Westminster SW1H 9AA | 1927 | | 575 | |
| Lord Palmerston (1784–1865) | "IN THIS HOUSE FORMERLY A ROYAL RESIDENCE LIVED LORD PALMERSTON (1784–1865) Prime Minister and Foreign Secretary" | Cambridge House, 94 Piccadilly; Mayfair, W1J 7BP | 1961 | | 278 | |
| Sardar Vallabhbhai Javerbhai Patel (1875–1950) | "Indian Statesman lived here" | 23 Aldridge Road Villas; Ladbroke Grove W11 1BN | 1991 | | 28 | The plaque is a replica placed by English Heritage to replace the original Greater London Council plaque of 1986 that was damaged in building work. |
| George Peabody (1795–1869) | "Philanthropist died here" | 80 Eaton Square; Belgravia SW1W 9AP | 1976 | | 646 | |
| Sir Arthur Pearson (1866–1921) | "Founder of St Dunstan’s (Blind Veterans UK) lived and worked here" | 21 Portland Place; Marylebone W1B 1PY | 2019 | | 51838 | |
| John Loughborough Pearson and Sir Edwin Landseer Lutyens (1817–1897) and (1869–1944) | "Here lived and died JOHN LOUGHBOROUGH PEARSON 1817–1897 and later SIR EDWIN LANDSEER LUTYENS 1869–1944 Architects" | 13 Mansfield Street; Marylebone W1G 9NZ | 1962 | | 357 | |
| Sir Robert Peel, 1st Baronet and Robert Peel (1750–1830) and (1788–1850) | "SIR ROBERT PEEL 1750–1830 Manufacturer and reformer and his son SIR ROBERT PEEL 1788–1850 Prime Minister Founder of the Metropolitan Police lived here" | 16 Upper Grosvenor Street; Mayfair W1K 7EH | 1988 | | 434 | |
| Henry Pelham (c.1695–1754) | "Prime Minister lived here" | Wimbourne House 22 Arlington Street; St James's SW1A 1RW | 1995 | | 251 | The plaque is on the rear of the house, facing into Green Park |
| Samuel Pepys (1633–1703) | "DIARIST AND SECRETARY OF THE ADMIRALTY lived here 1679–1688" | 12 Buckingham Street; Covent Garden WC2N 6DF | 1947 | | 606 | |
| William Petty, 2nd Earl of Shelburne and 1st Marquess of Lansdowne (1737–1805) | "Prime Minister Supporter of American Independence lived here" | Lansdowne Club, 9 Fitzmaurice Place; Mayfair W1J 5JD | 2003 | | 367 | A second blue plaque on the building commemorates Harry Gordon Selfridge. |
| Sir Arthur Pinero (1855–1934) | "PLAYWRIGHT lived here 1909–1934" | 115a Harley Street; Marylebone W1G 6AP | 1970 | | 175 | |
| William Pitt, 1st Earl of Chatham, Edward Smith-Stanley, 14th Earl of Derby, and William Gladstone (1809–1898), (1809–1898) and (1809–1898) | "Here lived Three Prime Ministers WILLIAM PITT Earl of Chatham 1708–1778 Edward Geoffrey Stanley EARL OF DERBY 1799–1869 William Ewart GLADSTONE 1809–1898" | 10 St James's Square; St James's SW1Y 4LE | 1910 | | 258 | |
| William Pitt the Younger (1759–1806) | "lived here 1803 to 1804" | 120 Baker Street; Marylebone W1U 6TU | 1949 | | 465 | The plaque dates from 1949, replacing a London County Council plaque from 1904. |
| Augustus Pitt Rivers (1827–1900) | "Lieutenant General Augustus Henry Lane Fox Pitt-Rivers 1827–1900 Anthropologist and Archaeologist lived here" | 4 Grosvenor Gardens; Belgravia SW1W 0DH | 1983 | | 149 | |
| Sebastião José de Carvalho e Melo, 1st Marquis of Pombal | "THESE TWO HOUSES WERE THE PORTUGUESE EMBASSY 1724–1747 THE MARQUESS OF POMBAL Portuguese Statesman Ambassador 1739–1744 lived here" | 23–24 Golden Square; Soho W1F 9JP | 1980 | | 537 | |
| Michael Powell & Emeric Pressburger (1905–1990) & (1902–1988) | "Film-Makers worked here in Flat 120" | Dorset House, Gloucester Place; Marylebone NW1 5AG | 2014 | | 30544 | |
| Archibald Primrose, 5th Earl of Rosebery (1847–1929) | "PRIME MINISTER and first Chairman of the London County Council was born here" | 20 Charles Street; Mayfair W1J 5DT | 1962 | | 148 | |
| Barbara Pym (1913-1980) | "Novelist lived here 1945–1949" | 108 Cambridge Street; Pimlico SW1V 4QF | 2025 | | 75918 | |
| J. Arthur Rank (1888–1972) | "Industrialist and Film Producer worked here" | 38 South Street; Mayfair W1K 1DJ | 2012 | | 32950 | |
| Eleanor Rathbone (1872–1946) | "Pioneer of Family Allowances lived here" | Tufton Court, Tufton Street; Westminster SW1P 3QH | 1986 | | 351 | |
| Sir William Reid Dick (1878–1961) | "Sculptor worked here in Studio 3 1910–1914" | Clifton Hill Studios, 95a Clifton Hill; St John's Wood NW8 0JP | 2001 | | 581 | |
| John Reith, 1st Baron Reith (1889–1971) | "First Director-General of the BBC lived here 1924–1930" | 6 Barton Street; Westminster SW1P 3NG | 1995 | | 277 | This plaque replaces that of 1994 and is situated on the building's Cowley Street elevation. |
| Mustapha Reschid Pasha (1800–1858) | "Turkish Statesman and Reformer lived here as Ambassador in 1839" | 1 Bryanston Square; Marylebone W1H 8DH | 1972 | | 170 | |
| Sir Joshua Reynolds (1723–1792) | "PORTRAIT PAINTER lived and died in a house on this site" | Fanum House (site of 47), Leicester Square, WC2H 7FG | 1960 | | 703 | The plaque was placed in 1960 having originally been erected in 1947, that plaque replacing a Royal Society of Arts plaque from 1869, placed on a building now demolished. |
| George Richmond (1809–1896) | "Painter lived here 1843–1896" | 20 York Street; Marylebone W1U 6PU | 1961 | | 553 | |
| Dame Lucie Rie (1902–1995) | "Potter lived and worked here from 1939 until her death" | 18 Albion Mews; Paddington W2 2BA | 2008 | | 328 | |
| Dr J.S. Risien Russell (1863–1939) | "Neurologist lived and worked here from 1902" | 44 Wimpole Street; Marylebone W1G 8SA | 2021 | | 328 | |
| Frederick Roberts, 1st Earl Roberts (1832–1914) | "LIVED HERE" | 47 Portland Place; Marylebone W1B 1JH | 1922 | | 37 | |
| Dr. Joseph Rogers (1821–1889) | "Health Care Reformer lived here" | 33 Dean Street; Soho W1D 4PW | 1996 | | 174 | |
| Charles Rolls (1877–1910) | "Pioneer of Motoring and Aviation worked here 1905–1910" | 14/15 Conduit Street; Mayfair W1S 2XJ | 2010 | | 4866 | |
| Sir Ronald Ross (1857–1932) | "Nobel Laureate Discoverer of the mosquito transmission of malaria lived here" | 18 Cavendish Square; Marylebone W1G 0PJ | 1985 | | 222 | |
| Dante Gabriel Rossetti (1828–1882) | "Poet & Painter Born Here" | 110 Hallam Street; Fitzrovia W1W 5HD | 1906 | | 27 | A plaque marks the buildings demolition in 1928 and the plaques re-erection. |
| Thomas Rowlandson (1757–1828) | "ARTIST AND CARICATURIST lived in a house on this site" | 16 John Adam Street; Charing Cross WC2N 6HE | 1950 | | 504 | |
| Major-General William Roy (1726–1790) | "Founder of the Ordnance Survey lived here" | 10 Argyll Street; Soho W1F 7TQ | 1979 | | 173 | |
| John Russell, 1st Earl Russell (1792–1878) | "Twice Prime Minister Lived Here" | 37 Chesham Place; Belgravia SW1X 6HB | 1911 | | 60 | |
| Anthony Salvin (1799–1881) | "Architect lived here" | 11 Hanover Terrace; Regent's Park NW1 4RJ | 1990 | | 624 | |
| José de San Martín (1778–1850) | "ARGENTINE SOLDIER AND STATESMAN stayed here" | 23 Park Road; Marylebone NW1 6XN | 1953 | | 681 | |
| Sir Charles Santley (1834–1922) | "SINGER Lived and died here" | 13 Blenheim Road; St John's Wood NW8 0LU | 1935 | | 645 | |
| Olive Schreiner (1855–1920) | "Author lived here" | 16 Portsea Place; Paddington W2 2BL | 1959 | | 534 | |
| Scotland Yard (1829–1890) | "SITE OF SCOTLAND YARD FIRST HEADQUARTERS OF THE METROPOLITAN POLICE 1829–1890" | 4 Whitehall Place, Whitehall Lane; Westminster SW1A 2HH | 1979 | | 172 | |
| Giles Gilbert Scott (1880–1960) | "Architect designed this house and lived here 1926–1960" | Chester House, Clarendon Place; Paddington W2 2NP | 1990 | | 240 | |
| Ronnie Scott (1927–1996) | "Jazz musician and raconteur ran his club in the basement 1959–1965" | 39 Gerrard Street; Soho W1D 5QD | 2019 | | 23694 | |
| Mary Seacole (1805–1881) | "Jamaican Nurse HEROINE OF THE CRIMEAN WAR lived here" | 14 Soho Square; Soho W1D 3QG | 2007 | | 604 | |
| George Seferis (1900–1971) | "Greek Ambassador Poet and Nobel laureate lived here 1957–1962" | 51 Upper Brook Street; Mayfair W1K 2BT | 2000 | | 1 | |
| Sir Henry Segrave (1896–1930) | "World Speed Record Holder lived here in flat No.6 1917–1920" | St Andrew's Mansions, Dorset Street; Marylebone W1U 4EQ | 2009 | | 4756 | |
| Harry Gordon Selfridge (1858–1974) | "Department Store Magnate lived here 1921–1929" | Lansdowne Club, 9 Fitzmaurice Place; Mayfair W1J 5JD | 2003 | | 181 | A second blue plaque on the building commemorates William Petty, 2nd Earl of Shelburne. |
| Mary Shelley (1797–1851) | "Author of Frankenstein lived here 1846–1851" | 24 Chester Square; Belgravia SW1W 9HS | 2003 | | 431 | |
| Percy Bysshe Shelley (1792–1822) | "Poet lived here in 1811" | 15 Poland Street; Soho W1F 8QE | 2000 | | 580 | The plaque was erected by English Heritage in 2000 to replace a Greater London Council plaque originally erected in 1979 that was lost during refurbishment work in 1996. |
| E. H. Shepard (1879–1976) | "Painter and Illustrator lived here" | 10 Kent Terrace; Regent's Park NW1 4RP | 1993 | | 264 | |
| Thomas Sheraton (1751–1806) | "furniture designer lived here" | 163 Wardour Street; Soho W1F 8WL | 1954 | | 391 | |
| Richard Brinsley Sheridan (1751–1816) | "DRAMATIST. LIVED HERE." | 14 Savile Row; Mayfair W1S 3JN | 1881 | | 644 | |
| Richard Brinsley Sheridan (1751–1816) | "dramatist and statesman lived here 1795–1802" | 10 Hertford Street; Mayfair W1J 7RL | 1955 | | 300 | A second blue plaque on the building commemorates General John Burgoyne. |
| F. E. Smith, 1st Earl of Birkenhead (1872–1930) | "Lawyer and Statesman lived here" | 32 Grosvenor Gardens; Belgravia SW1W 0DH | 1959 | | 26 | |
| William Henry Smith (1825–1891) | "BOOKSELLER and STATESMAN lived here" | 12 Hyde Park Street; Paddington W2 2JN | 1961 | | 315 | This plaque had first been sited at 3 Grosvenor Place, and was moved here in 1964 after that buildings redevelopment. |
| William Smith M.P. (1756–1835) | "Pioneer of religious liberty lived here" | 16 Queen Anne's Gate; Westminster SW1H 9AA | 1975 | | 610 | A second blue plaque on the building commemorates John Fisher, 1st Baron Fisher. |
| Mansfield Smith-Cumming (1859–1923) | "First Chief of the Secret Service lived and worked here 1911–1922" | 2 Whitehall Court; Westminster SW1A 2EJ | 2014 | | 39301 | Unveiled 30 March 2015 |
| James Smithson (1764–1829) | "Scientist Founder of the Smithsonian Institution lived here" | 9 Bentinck Street; Marylebone W1U 2EJ | 2008 | | 109 | |
| Lord FitzRoy Somerset, 1st Baron Raglan (1788–1855) | "Commander during the Crimean War Lived Here" | 5 Stanhope Gate; Mayfair W1K 1LQ | 1911 | | 162 | |
| Sir Thomas Sopwith (1888–1989) | "Aviator and aircraft manufacturer lived here 1934–1940" | 46 Green Street; Mayfair W1K 7FY | 1998 | | 366 | |
| Sir Bernard Spilsbury (1877–1947) | "Forensic Pathologist lived here 1912–1940" | 31 Marlborough Hill; St John's Wood NW8 0NG | 2004 | | 667 | |
| Constance Spry (1886–1960) | "Designer in Flowers worked here 1934–1960" | 64 South Audley Street; Mayfair W1K 3JP | 2012 | | 31295 | |
| Charles Stanhope, 3rd Earl Stanhope (1753–1816) | "REFORMER AND INVENTOR lived here" | 20 Mansfield Street; Marylebone W1G 6NP | 1951 | | 525 | |
| Albert Stanley, 1st Baron Ashfield (1874–1948) | "First Chairman of London Transport lived here" | 43 South Street; Mayfair W1K 2XQ | 1984 | | 360 | |
| Sir Henry Morton Stanley (1841–1904) | "Explorer and Writer lived and died here" | 2 Richmond Terrace; Whitehall SW1A 2NJ | 1987 | | 546 | Though made by the Greater London Council, the plaque was erected by English Heritage. |
| George Stephenson (1803–1859) | "Engineer Died Here" | 35 Gloucester Square; Paddington W2 2DT | 1905 | | 643 | The plaque had originally been located next door, at 34 Gloucester Square, and was moved to its present location after the original building was demolished in 1937. |
| Sir George Frederic Still (1868–1941) | "Pædiatrician lived here" | 28 Queen Anne Street; Marylebone W1G 8HY | 1993 | | 82 | |
| Thomas Stothard (1755–1834) | "Painter and Illustrator Lived Here" | 28 Newman Street; Fitzrovia W1T 1PR | 1911 | | 88 | The plaque was re-sited on the building when it was given a new facade in 1924. |
| William Strang (1859–1921) | "Painter and etcher lived here 1900–1921" | 20 Hamilton Terrace; St John's Wood NW8 9UG | 1962 | | 52 | |
| George Edmund Street (1824–1881) | "Architect lived here" | 14 Cavendish Place; Marylebone W1G 9DJ | 1980 | | 455 | |
| Marie Taglioni (1809–1884) | "Ballet Dancer lived here in 1875–1876" | 14 Connaught Square; Paddington W2 2HG | 1960 | | 642 | |
| Prince Talleyrand (1754–1838) | "French Statesman and Diplomatist lived here" | 21 Hanover Square; Mayfair W1S 1JW | 1978 | | 15 | |
| Richard Tauber (1891–1948) | "Lyric Tenor lived here in flat 297 1947–1948" | Park West, Edgware Road; Paddington W2 1QN | 1998 | | 98 | |
| Dame Marie Tempest (1864–1942) | "Actress lived here 1899–1902" | 24 Park Crescent; Regent's Park W1B 1AL | 1972 | | 691 | |
| Alfred, Lord Tennyson (1809–1882) | "Poet lived here in 1880 and 1881" | 9 Upper Belgrave Street; Belgravia SW1X 8BD | 1994 | | 97 | |
| Lord Kelvin (1824–1907) | "Physicist and Inventor lived here" | 15 Eaton Place; Belgravia SW1X 8BN | 1996 | | 411 | |
| Lokamanya Tilak (1856–1920) | "Indian Patriot and Philosopher lived here 1918–1919" | 10 Howley Place; Paddington W2 1XA | 1988 | | 314 | A plaque bearing the name of the London County Council commemorating Giovanni Antonio Canal is at the same house. It was not authorized by the LCC. |
| Charles Townley (1737–1805) | "Antiquary and Collector lived here" | 14 Queen Anne's Gate; Westminster SW1H 9AA | 1985 | | 76 | |
| Sir Frederick Treves (1853–1923) | "Surgeon lived here 1886–1907" | 6 Wimpole Street; Marylebone W1G 8AL | 2000 | | 245 | |
| Anthony Trollope (1815–1882) | "Novelist lived here" | 39 Montagu Square; Marylebone W1H 2LL | 1914 | | 573 | This plaque was moved after its unveiling to its present prominent position. |
| Gertrude Tuckwell (1861–1951) | "Campaigner for working women, trade unionist and magistrate lived in flat 52" | 2 Westminster Mansions, Little Smith Street; St James's SW1W 3BP | 2026 | | 93856 | |
| Alan Turing (1912–1954) | "Code-breaker and Pioneer of Computer Science was born here" | 2 Warrington Crescent; Maida Vale W9 1ER | 1998 | | 381 | Unveiled on 23 June 1998 by Turing biographer and mathematician Andrew Hodges. |
| Marie Tussaud (1761–1850) | "Artist in Wax lived here 1838–1839" | 24 Wellington Road; St John's Wood NW8 9SP | 2001 | | 408 | |
| Tyburn Tree | "THE SITE OF TYBURN TREE" | A traffic island at the junction of Edgware Road and Bayswater Road; Marble Arch W2 | 1964 | | 1644 | A triangular shaped London County Council plaque from 1909 originally marked the location of the tree. |
| United States Embassy and Henry Brooks Adams (1838–1918) | "UNITED STATES EMBASSY 1863–1866 HENRY BROOKS ADAMS 1838–1918 U.S. Historian lived here" | 98 Portland Place; Marylebone W1B 1ET | 1978 | | 448 | |
| Martin van Buren (1782–1862) | "Eighth U.S. President lived here" | 7 Stratford Place; Marylebone W1C 1AY | 1977 | | 544 | |
| Ralph Vaughan Williams O. M. (1872–1958) | "Composer lived here from 1953 until his death" | 10 Hanover Terrace; Regent's Park NW1 4RJ | 1972 | | 618 | |
| Field Marshal Viscount Gort V.C. (1886–1946) | "Commander-in-Chief at Dunkirk lived here 1920–1926" | 34 Belgrave Square; Belgravia SW1X 8QB | 2005 | | 4358 | |
| Swami Vivekananda (1863–1902) | "Hindu philosopher lived here in 1896" | 63 St George's Drive; Pimlico SW1V 4DD | 2004 | | 615 | |
| C.F.A. Voysey (1857–1941) | "Architect and Designer lived here" | 6 Carlton Hill; St John's Wood NW8 0JY | 1995 | | 179 | |
| Thomas Wallis (1872-1953) | "The firm headed by Thomas Wallis 1872–1953 Architect designed this building and was based here 1933–1946" | Victoria Coach Station, 15 Elizabeth Street; Victoria W1W 9RH | 2025 | | 69240 | |
| Sir Robert Walpole (1676–1745) and Horace Walpole (1717–1797) | "SIR ROBERT WALPOLE 1676–1745 Prime Minister and his son HORACE WALPOLE 1717–1797 Connoisseur and Man of Letters lived here" | 5 Arlington Street; St James's SW1A 1RA | 1976 | | 204 | The joint GLC plaque replaced the single Royal Society of Arts plaque from 1881 placed to honour Robert Walpole which had become badly weathered. |
| Sir William Walton (1902–1983) | "Composer lived here" | Lowndes Cottage, 8 Lowndes Place; Belgravia SW1X 8DD | 2009 | | 39651 | |
| Sir Fabian Ware (1869–1919) | "Founder of the Imperial War Graves Commission lived here 1911-1919" | 14 Wyndham Place; Marylebone W1H 2PZ | 2014 | | 33148 | |
| Alfred Waterhouse (1830–1905) | "Architect lived here" | 61 New Cavendish Street; Marylebone W1G 7AR | 1988 | | 160 | |
| John William Waterhouse (1849–1917) | "Painter lived here 1900–1917" | 10 Hall Road; St John's Wood NW8 9PD | 2002 | | 221 | |
| Victor 'Vicky' Weisz (1913–1966) | "Cartoonist lived and died in a flat in this building" | Welbeck Mansions, 35 Welbeck Street; Marylebone W1 | 1996 | | 659 | |
| H. G. Wells (1866–1946) | "WRITER lived and died here" | 13 Hanover Terrace; Regent's Park NW1 4JR | 1966 | | 25 | |
| Charles Wesley (1707–1788), Charles Wesley (1757–1834), and Samuel Wesley (1766–1837) | "CHARLES WESLEY 1707–1788 DIVINE AND HYMN WRITER LIVED AND DIED IN A HOUSE ON THIS SITE AND HIS SONS CHARLES 1757–1834 & SAMUEL 1766–1837 MUSICIANS ALSO LIVED HERE" | 1 Wheatley Street; Marylebone W1G 8PS | 1953 | | 690 | |
| Sir Richard Westmacott (1775–1856) | "Sculptor lived and died here" | 14 South Audley Street; Mayfair W1K 1HN | 1955 | | 656 | |
| Sir Charles Wheatstone (1802–1875) | "Scientist and Inventor lived here" | 19 Park Crescent; Regent's Park W1B 1AL | 1981 | | 591 | |
| Sir Mortimer Wheeler (1890–1976) | "Archæologist lived here" | 27 Whitcomb Street; Leicester Square WC2H 7EP | 1993 | | 159 | |
| Kenneth Williams (1926–1988) | "Comic Actor lived here in Flat 62 1963–1970" | Farley Court, Allsop Place; Marylebone NW1 5LG | 2014 | | 30556 | |
| John Gilbert Winant (1889–1947) | "United States Ambassador 1941–1946 lived here" | 7 Aldford Street; Mayfair W1K 2AQ | 1982 | | 687 | |
| Major Walter Clopton Wingfield (1833–1912) | "Father of Lawn Tennis lived here" | 33 St George's Square; Pimlico SW1V 2HX | 1987 | | 244 | Though made by the Greater London Council, the plaque was erected by English Heritage. |
| The Women’s Freedom League | "campaigned for women’s equality from here 1908–1915" | 1 Robert Street; Adelphi WC2N 6RL | 2023 | | 59353 | This plaque marked the first occasion that the London scheme reached 1000 plaques. |
| P. G. Wodehouse (1881–1975) | "Writer lived here" | 17 Dunraven Street; Mayfair W1K 7EG | 1988 | | 603 | |
| E. F. L. Wood, 1st Earl of Halifax (1881–1959) | "Statesman, Viceroy of India, and Foreign Secretary lived here" | 86 Eaton Square; Belgravia SW1W 9AG; 1994 | | | 202 | |
| Sir Jeffry Wyatville (1766–1840) | "Architect lived and died here" | 39 Brook Street; Mayfair W1K 4JE | 1984 | | 349 | |
| Sir Charles Wyndham (1837–1919) | "Actor-Manager lived and died here" | 20 York Terrace East; Regent's Park NW1 4PT | 1962 | | 447 | The plaque was repositioned in 1985. |
| Thomas Young (1773–1829) | "MAN OF SCIENCE lived here" | 48 Welbeck Street; Marylebone W1G 8EZ | 1951 | | 516 | This plaque replaced a light green plaque, also placed by the London County Council, in 1905. |
| Stefan Zweig (1881-1942) | "Austrian Writer lived here in flat 71 1936–1939" | 49 Hallam Street; Marylebone W1GW 6DE | 2026 | | 86959 | |

== See also ==
- List of English Heritage blue plaques in Camden
- List of English Heritage blue plaques in Kensington and Chelsea
