= 49th Parallel (film) =

1941 film by Michael Powell & Emeric Pressburger

- Original Australian film poster
- Directed by: Michael Powell
- Screenplay by: Emeric Pressburger
- Story by: Emeric Pressburger; Rodney Ackland
- Produced by: Michael Powell
- Starring: Leslie Howard; Laurence Olivier; Anton Walbrook; Raymond Massey; Glynis Johns; Eric Portman
- Cinematography: Freddie Young
- Edited by: David Lean
- Music by: Ralph Vaughan Williams
- Production company: Ortus Films
- Distributed by: General Film Distributors
- Release dates: 8 October 1941 (London, premiere); 24 November 1941 (UK); 5 March 1942 (New York)
- Running time: 123 minutes
- Country: United Kingdom
- Languages: English; French; German
- Budget: £132,000
- Box office: £250,000 (in Britain) $5 million (US/Canada)

49th Parallel (released in the United States as The Invaders) is a 1941 British epic war drama film, the third made by the team of Michael Powell and Emeric Pressburger. It stars Leslie Howard, Laurence Olivier, Anton Walbrook, Raymond Massey, Glynis Johns and Eric Portman. The plot involves a German U-boat crew that is stranded in Canada, and attempts to cross into the then-neutral United States.

The film was conceived as a propaganda vehicle by the British Ministry of Information, intended to sway American involvement in World War II. The title refers to the 49th parallel north circle of latitude, which separates Canada from the United States.

The film was released in Britain on November 24, 1941. It was both a critical and a commercial success and was one of the highest-grossing British films of 1941. It won the Academy Award for Best Story, and was nominated for Best Picture and Best Original Screenplay.

== Plot ==
In the Gulf of St Lawrence, German U-boat U-37 sinks a Canadian freighter and then evades the RCN and RCAF by sailing into Hudson Bay. While a raiding party of six is ashore in search of food and fuel, the U-boat is sunk by RCAF bombers. The six survivors head for the neutral United States, led by Lieutenants Hirth and Kuhnecke.

When a floatplane is dispatched to investigate reports of the sinking, the Germans open fire, killing the pilot and some of the local Inuit. They steal the aircraft but cannot achieve takeoff because they are overloaded. After a sailor is shot and killed by an Inuk, the load is light enough for takeoff.

Heading south, the floatplane exhausts its fuel and crashes into a lake in Manitoba, killing Kuhnecke. The Germans are welcomed by a nearby Hutterite farming community. Hirth assumes that the Hutterites are sympathetic to the Nazi cause, but his fanatical speech is refuted by Peter, the community's leader. One of the sailors, Vogel, would rather join the community, but he is tried by Hirth and executed for desertion.

Hirth, Lohrmann and Kranz arrive in Winnipeg. Hirth decides that they will travel west to Vancouver and catch a steamship for Japan. They hijack a car and then board a train that stops in Banff, Alberta, during Banff Indian Days. A Mountie addresses the crowd and Kranz is arrested when he panics.

Fleeing across the Rocky Mountains, the two remaining men are welcomed to a lakeside camp by eccentric English writer Philip Armstrong Scott, who takes them for lost tourists. After they burn his manuscript and precious paintings, Scott and his men pursue them. Lohrmann finally rebels against Hirth's leadership and takes off by himself. Lohrmann is cornered in a cave. Scott is wounded but enters the cave and beats Lohrmann unconscious.

Hirth, the last fugitive, meets Andy Brock, a Canadian soldier who is absent without leave, in a freight car on a train near the international border. Hirth knocks Brock unconscious with the butt of his gun and steals his uniform and dog tags. After the train crosses the border at Niagara Falls, Hirth surrenders his gun to a customs official and demands to be taken to the German embassy. Brock tells the official that Hirth, now globally famous, is wanted in Canada for murder. The customs officials are powerless to do anything, but then Brock has an inspiration: he says that because neither man is listed on the freight manifest, they cannot enter the country. Using this technicality, the officials reject the cargo and send the train back to Canada. As the train passes over the bridge, Brock dons his uniform cap and announces his intent to take back his pants.

== Cast ==
The Canadians

- Laurence Olivier as Johnnie
- Finlay Currie as the factor
- Ley On as Nick
- Anton Walbrook as Peter
- Glynis Johns as Anna
- Charles Victor as Andreas
- Frederick Piper as David
- Leslie Howard as Philip Armstrong Scott
- Tawera Moana as George
- Eric Clavering as Art
- Charles Rolfe as Bob
- Raymond Massey as Andy Brock

The U-boat crew

- Richard George as Kommandant Bernsdorff
- Eric Portman as Lieutenant Hirth
- Raymond Lovell as Lieutenant Kuhnecke
- Niall MacGinnis as Vogel
- Peter Moore as Kranz
- John Chandos as Lohrmann
- Basil Appleby as Jahner

The Americans

- Theodore Salt and O. W. Fonger as US Customs Officers

== Production ==
=== Development ===
The British Ministry of Information approached Michael Powell to produce a propaganda film, suggesting minesweeping as the subject. Powell instead desired to make a film to help sway opinion in the neutral United States. Powell persuaded the British and Canadian governments and started location filming in 1940, but by the time the film appeared in March 1942, the U.S. was already involved in the war. Powell's interest in creating a propaganda film in Canada dovetailed with some of Pressburger's work. The screenplay was initially based on Pressburger's idea to replicate the Ten Little Indians scenario of people being removed from a group, one by one. Arthur Horman, who wrote several sequences, later wrote Desperate Journey, a film with a similar story.

=== Casting ===
The original choice to play German officer Hirth was Esmond Knight, but he was unavailable because of his military duties. Anton Walbrook donated half his fee to the International Red Cross. Raymond Massey, Laurence Olivier and Leslie Howard all agreed to work at half of their normal fees. The film marked the only time that Canadian-born Massey played a Canadian on screen, and he was persuaded to take the role by his brother Vincent, the then-High Commissioner of Canada to Great Britain and future Governor General. Vincent Massey also provided the opening narration to the film, albeit uncredited.

Elisabeth Bergner was originally cast in the role of Anna but deserted the film, refusing to return to Britain for the studio scenes. As an Austrian, she feared for her life if the Nazis were to invade. Glynis Johns replaced Bergner. However, many location wide shots in which Bergner appeared were salvaged for the film, including the initial long shots of Anna.

=== Filming ===
Shooting took place in various locations across Canada, including Banff National Park, Niagara Falls, Winnipeg, Corner Brook, Cape Wolstenholme, and Yoho National Park. Studio interiors were filmed back in England at Denham Film Studios.

Although the film's budget was intended to be £68,000, costs ran to £132,000, of which the government provided less than £60,000. Bergner's leave, along with Olivier and Massey nearly pulling out and budget overruns, nearly led to the film being canceled. However, J. Arthur Rank stepped in and provided additional funding.

The replica U-37 carried two 1,000-pound bombs supplied by the RCAF. Powell did not inform the actors that the bombs were aboard so that the actors would not be nervous. The actors were replaced by dummies before the bombs were detonated. Powell's voice can be heard faintly in some of the submarine scenes. Once, when the camera boat almost collides with the submarine, Powell says, "Keep rolling." The men in the lifeboat at the start of the film were mainly local merchant seamen, many of whom had already been torpedoed.

Lovell nearly drowned filming the scene in which the commandeered floatplane crashes. The plane sank faster than anticipated, and a stink bomb that was thrown in to "heighten the turmoil" added to the chaos. A member of the camera crew jumped into the water and saved Lovell.

=== Music ===
Ralph Vaughan Williams provided the music, his first film score. The music was directed by Muir Mathieson and performed by the London Symphony Orchestra.

== Release ==
The film premiered in London on October 8, 1941, and went into general release on November 24.

Although the film had been intended to sway American involvement in World War II, it was ultimately released stateside on March 5, 1942, several months after American entry into the war. Columbia distributed the film in the U.S. in 1942 as The Invaders for a reported $200,000 after Universal had declined. American censors cut 19 minutes from the film, including the speech by the fanatical Nazi commander who claims that Eskimos are like Negros and "semi-apes, only one degree above the Jews", which was removed to avoid offending segregationists in the American South. The American film trailer was made on the set of the film The Talk of the Town under the title It Happened One Noon, with stars Cary Grant, Jean Arthur and Ronald Colman telling director George Stevens about seeing the exciting film during a two-hour lunch break.

=== Box office ===
According to Kinematograph Weekly, 49th Parallel was the most popular film at the British box office in 1941. The Times attributed the success of the film to the enthusiasm of Odeon Cinemas founder Oscar Deutsch.

Variety estimated that the film earned $1.3 million in U.S. rentals in 1942. The film earned a total of $5 million at the North American box office.

The British Film Institute ranked 49th Parallel at No. 63 among the most popular films with British audiences based on a cinema attendance of 9.3 million in the UK.

== Reception ==
In a contemporary review for the Liverpool Evening Express, critic Cedric Fraser called 49th Parallel "[o]ne of the finest pictures ever made in this country" and wrote: "This is a magnificent film, fair to the point of scrupulousness, and revealing in all its ruthlessness the savagery of the typical Nazi."

J. E. Sewell of The Daily Telegraph wrote: "It is a grown-up's film, presenting our point of view with fairness, vigour and humanity through the medium of an exciting, vivid story, and some of the best short characterizations I have ever seen. All I could wish changed is the title, which seems to me to be almost completely irrelevant."

In The New York Times, critic Bosley Crowther wrote: "Among the best of the anti-Nazi pictures which have yet been exhibited hereabouts, you can list the British-made The Invaders... For this, indeed, is a picture which not only argues trenchantly but is filmed and played with such intelligence that it gives an illusion of documented fact. ... And, except for a few static stretches and one slightly artificial sequence, it stands up with Target for Tonight as one of the memorable war films so far. For the purpose of ideological contrasts—or for tense and exciting action, too—a better story could hardly have been conceived. ... The Invaders is an absorbing and exciting film."

49th Parallel holds an 88% approval rating on Rotten Tomatoes based on 16 reviews.

=== Awards and nominations ===
Pressburger won an Oscar for Best Story and the film was nominated for Best Picture (Outstanding Motion Picture) and Best Screenplay (including Rodney Ackland for additional dialogue). Powell was nominated for Best Director by the New York Film Critics Circle.
