= Rose Edith Kelly =

Wife of Aleister Crowley

Rose Kelly
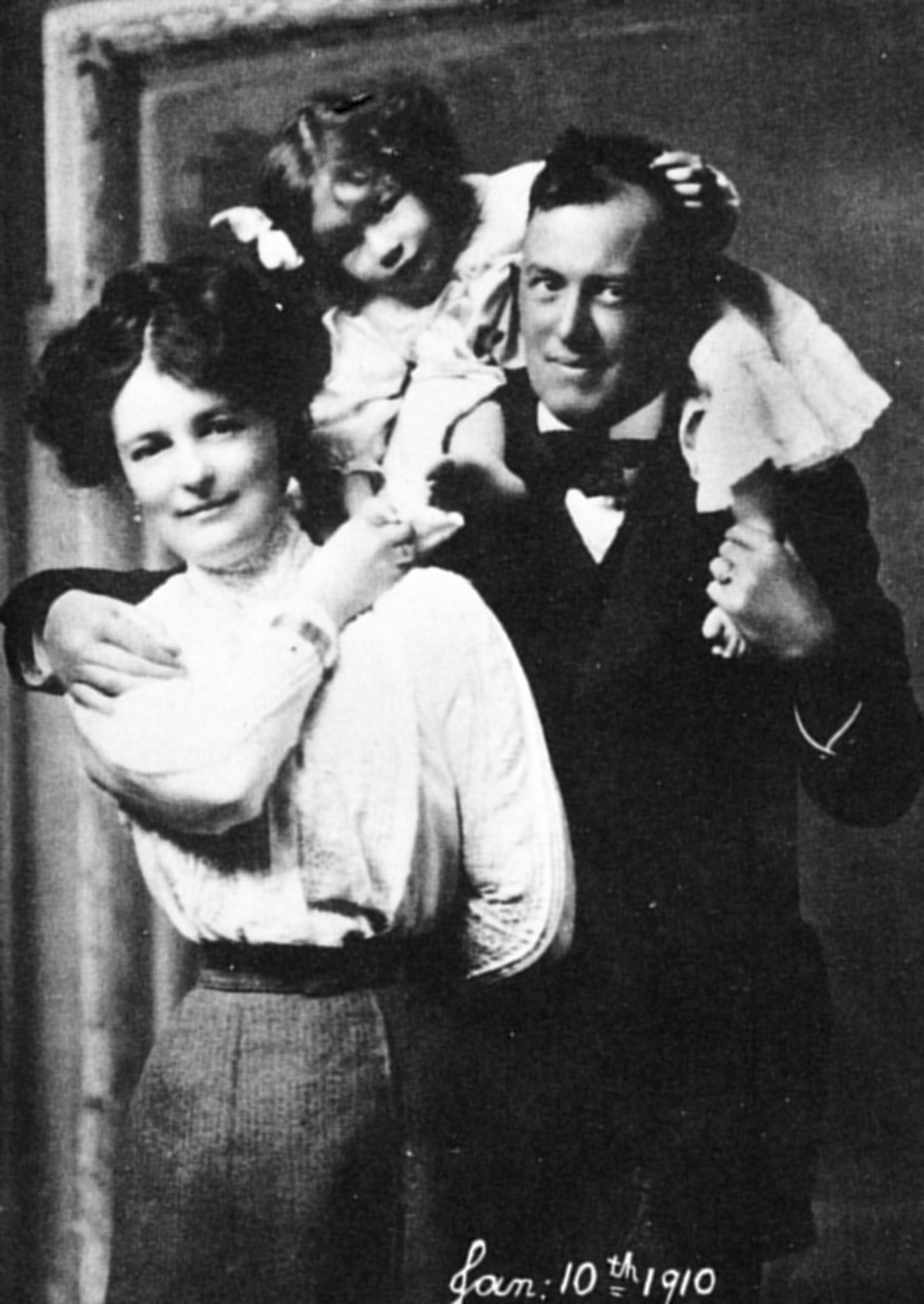
- Rose Kelly with Aleister Crowley and their daughter Lola Zaza
- Born: 23 July 1874; Paddington, Middlesex, England
- Died: 11 February 1932 (aged 57); England
- Spouses: Frederick Thomas Skerrett (m. 1897; died 1899) Aleister Crowley (m. 1903; div. 1909) Joseph Andrew Gormley (m. 1912; died 1925)
- Children: 2
- Relatives: Gerald Kelly (brother)

Rose Edith Kelly (23 July 1874 – 11 February 1932) was the wife of occult writer Aleister Crowley, whom she married in 1903. In 1904, she aided him in the Cairo Working that led to the reception of The Book of the Law, on which Crowley based much of his philosophy and religion, Thelema.

== Early life ==
Rose Edith Kelly was born at 78 Cambridge Terrace, Paddington, to Frederic Festus Kelly and Blanche (Bradford) Kelly. Her grandfather, also named Frederic Festus Kelly, was the founder of Kelly's Directories Ltd.

The eldest of three children – her siblings being Eleanor Constance Mary and Gerald Festus – the family moved to the Camberwell vicarage in 1880. Her father served as curate of the Parish of St. Giles for the next 35 years.

In 1895, Kelly escorted her brother Gerald to Cape Town, South Africa, where he convalesced from a liver ailment during the winter of 1895–96.

On 31 August 1897, she married Major Frederick Thomas Skerrett at St Giles' Church, Camberwell. He was a member of the Royal Army Medical Corps and about fifteen years older than she was. He died on 19 August 1899.

In 1902, she joined her brother Gerald in Paris, France, where she stayed for six months.

== Marriage to Crowley and The Book of the Law ==
Rose Kelly was introduced to Aleister Crowley by her brother, the artist Gerald Kelly. They eloped on 11 August and married on 12 August 1903, to save her from an arranged marriage. Their relationship, however, went beyond a marriage of convenience. Starting in 1903, Kelly and Crowley engaged in esoteric sexual practices adapted from Tantra and experimented with esoteric rituals. The two went on an extended honeymoon that brought them to Paris, Cairo, and then Ceylon in early 1904.

On 16 March 1904, "in an avowedly frivolous attempt to impress his wife", Crowley attempted to enable her to see Sylphs via the Bornless Ritual. Following this, at her direction, on three successive days beginning 8 April 1904, he entered his room and, starting at noon, and for exactly one hour, wrote down what he claimed he heard dictated from a shadowy presence behind him who identified himself as Aiwass. The results over the three days were the three chapters of verse known as The Book of the Law. At one point Crowley failed to hear a sentence, which Kelly later amended to page 19 of the original manuscript "The Five Pointed Star, with a Circle in the Middle, & the circle is Red." Crowley wrote her a series of love poems, published as Rosa Mundi and other Love Songs (1906).

Kelly had two daughters with Crowley: Nuit Ma Ahathoor Hecate Sappho Jezebel Lilith (1904–06) and Lola Zaza (1907–90). Lilith died of typhoid in Rangoon.

Crowley became increasingly frustrated with Rose's alcoholism, and in November 1909, he divorced her on the grounds of his own adultery, but they remained friends and Rose continued to live at his Boleskine House on the shore of Loch Ness in Scotland. Lola was eventually taken in by her uncle, Gerald. In September 1911, Crowley had Rose committed to an asylum for alcohol dementia.

== Later life and death ==
Kelly married Dr. Joseph Andrew Gormley in 1912, and they remained together until Gormley's death in 1925 at the age of 75. Kelly died in 1932 at the age of 57 in Middlesex.
