= Sao Ohn Nyunt =

Princess of Hsipaw

Princess Sao Ohn Nyunt
- Princess of Hsipaw
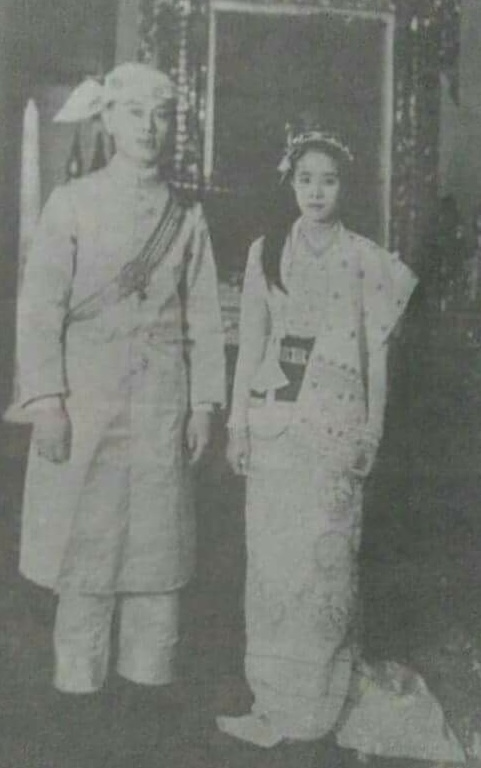
- Sao Kung Mong and Sao Ohn Nyunt
- Born: unknown Hsipaw
- Died: unknown
- Spouse: Prince Sao Kung Mong of Kengtung
- Issue: Sao Kan Gyi; Sao Kan Kywe; Sao Khun Oo; Sao Yan Paing; Sao Yan Naing; Sao Khayma Waddy
Names
- Sao Ohn Nyunt
- House: Hsipaw
- Father: Prince Sao Lu of Hsipaw
- Mother: Khin Padauk
- Religion: Theravada Buddhism

Sao Ohn Nyunt (စဝ်အုန်းညွန့် ) was a princess of Hsipaw, a now disestablished Shan state in present-day Myanmar. She is best known for her beauty and as the subject of Sir Gerald Kelly's notable portrait. She is referred to as the 'Mona Lisa of Asia' in Myanmar.

== Life ==
Sao Ohn Nyunt was the daughter of Prince Sao Lu, the younger brother of Sir Sao Chel, the Saopha of Hsipaw, and Khin Padauk, the princess consort of Hsipaw. Her maternal lineage traced back to Mandalay, as her mother was the daughter of U Be, a wealthy tycoon who had served under King Mindon. She had one older sister, Princess Sao Thunanda, who married Sao Ohn Kya and became the queen consort of Hsipaw. Later, Sao Ohn Nyunt married Sao Kung Mong, the son of the Saopha of Kengtung. Together, Sao Ohn Nyunt and Sao Kung Mong had a large family, including five sons—Sao Kan Gyi, Sao Kan Kywe, Sao Khun Oo, Sao Yan Paing, and Sao Yan Naing—and one daughter, Sao Khayma Waddy. Her daughter became the last queen consort of Mongpawn through her marriage to Sao Hsè Hom, the final ruling Saopha of Mongpawn and the son of the martyr Sao San Htun.

In 1931, Sao Ohn Nyunt traveled to London with her cousin, Sao Ohn Kya, the reigning Sawbwa of Hsipaw, to participate in the Round Table Conferences, which focused on constitutional reforms in Burma and India.

During her time in London, she attended a reception where she met the renowned British portrait artist Gerald Kelly (1879–1972). Impressed by her poise and beauty, Kelly persuaded her to sit for a series of portraits, which became notable works in his collection. Despite serving as court painter to the Royal Family during World War II, none of his works would bring him greater recognition than the 20 portraits of Sao Ohn Nyunt. Posters of these portraits went on to sell more than 50,000 copies and continue to be available today. In his account, Kelly noted that the princess experienced a profound nostalgia for her Shan homeland. When he encountered her at a reception, she was nearly "bored to tears" by England and its abominable weather. Her portrait has remained popular in modern-day Myanmar, and the painting was purchased by Burmese businessman Thet Paing Soe in 2011.
