= Jonathan Duncan (currency reformer) =

British advocate of monetary system reform

Jonathan Duncan (1799–1865), often referred to as "Jonathan Duncan, the younger", was a British advocate of reforming the monetary system.

He was born in Bombay while his father (also called Jonathan Duncan) was governor there. Following the death of Duncan, senior, in 1811, Sir Charles Forbes acted as his guardian.

He graduated with a B.A. from Trinity College, Cambridge in 1821.

In the years up to 1841, he wrote a number of history books about Russia, religious wars in France, and Guernsey. In 1846, he was editor of a newspaper called The Sentinel, and presented a petition to Parliament criticizing Frederic Festus Kelly, chief inspector of letter-carriers.

In 1846, he wrote the tract "How to reconcile the rights of property, capital, and labour" for the Currency Reform Association. In 1847 he wrote a tract for the National Anti-Gold Law League, arguing that the size of the circulation should be determined by supply and demand. He opposed bullionism and Sir Robert Peel's banking and monetary laws, and the monetary policies of Samuel Jones-Loyd.

Other publications included "The Principles of Money demonstrated, and Bullionist Fallacies refuted" (1849) and "The Bank Charter Act: ought the Bank of England or the People of England to receive the Profits of the National Circulation?" (1858).

From 1846 to 1853 he lived at No. 13 Chester Place, Kennington (this address was later known as 255 Kennington Road, Lambeth, London).
