= Frederic Festus Kelly =

Frederic Festus Kelly (died 3 June 1883) was a high official in the British Post Office. He was also the founder of Kelly & Co. (later Kelly's Directories Ltd.), which published the Kelly's Directory, a sort of Victorian-era "Yellow Pages" that listed all businesses, tradespeople, local gentry, landowners, charities, and other facilities located in a particular village, city or town.

In many sources, both contemporary and modern, his name is spelled Frederick. He should not be confused with his identically-named eldest son.

== Inspector of Letter Carriers ==
He began working for the Post Office in 1819. In 1835 or 1836 he became a chief inspector of letter carriers. His exact title varied over the years because in the early 19th century there were three separate services with separate corps of letter-carriers: twopenny-post (for mail within London; renamed the London District Post Office in 1844); inland (for domestic mail outside London); and foreign (for overseas mail). Although the foreign letter-carriers had been abolished by 1835, with their duties carried out by the other two services, the (by then renamed) General Post and London District letter-carriers remained separate until 1855, with separate chief inspectors. Before that date, Kelly was inspector of only the inland or general-post letter carriers.

Kelly lost his government post in 1860 when the office of Inspector-General of Letter Carriers was abolished.

== Post Office Directory ==
When he began his job as inspector of letter-carriers, Kelly took over the production of the Post Office London Directory. This directory had been started in 1799 by two inspectors of letter-carriers named Sparke and Ferguson, with the approval of the then joint Postmasters General, Lords Auckland and Gower. This date was later the basis for the claim "Kelly's Directories Ltd., established 1799" sometimes printed on the front cover of a Kelly's Directory, although this preceded Mr. Kelly's involvement by several decades.

The first edition had been called "The New Annual Directory; for the Year 1800", but in 1801 the name had changed to "The Post-office annual directory". Another inspector, Benjamin Critchett, joined in 1803; Sparke and Ferguson dropped from the list of authors in 1806 and Critchett and took over publication (in co-authorship with William Woods between 1810 and about 1827); the name changed to "Post Office London Directory" in the mid-1810s.

Critchett died in September 1836, and when Kelly took over his post, he had to purchase the copyright of the directory from Critchett's widow. The directory was in effect a private enterprise, although produced with the patronage of the Post Office and using labour of government-employed letter carriers as gatherers of data and as a sales force, something that Critchett's private-sector competitors had petitioned against in vain.

In 1845–1847, Kelly was sharply criticised by some members of Parliament, particularly Thomas Duncombe, and accused of using his office for his private benefit and for requiring letter-carriers to assist in gathering information for the directory. Duncombe also presented a petition from Jonathan Duncan complaining of abuses by Kelly. In 1847, the Chancellor of the Exchequer Charles Wood declared that Kelly could not use government employees in connection with his directory. Kelly then relied on his own employees to collect information for the directory, which he had already begun hiring in 1844.

== Expansion ==
Working with family members, including his brother Edward Robert Kelly, and William Kelly who ran the printing press, Frederic Kelly expanded his directories to include cities and towns other than London, beginning in 1845. Over the rest of nineteenth century, his company bought out or put out of business several rival publishers of directories. The company branched into other publications, such as the Handbook to the Titled, Landed and Official Classes (1875). Well after Frederic Kelly's death, the company name Kelly and Co. was replaced by the new company Kelly's Directories Limited in 1897.

Even after leaving his position at the post office, Kelly retained the copyright of the directory and continued to use the name "Post Office Directory"; his company even tried to claim exclusive rights to use "Post Office" in the name of a directory but lost the court case it brought over this issue (Kelly v. Byles, in 1879–80).

Kelly was also the plaintiff in the 1866 case Kelly v. Morris, accusing a competitor of pirating his compilation of information.

== Family ==
A dearth of biographical information was noted by a contemporary biographer of Men of the Time. Frederic Kelly is listed in Men of the Time, fifth (1862) through eighth (1872) editions, but not the ninth (1875) and subsequent editions. However, in the Journal of the Galway Archeological and Historical Society, E. Festus Kelly traces the family back to the original Ó Ceallaigh (O'Kelly).

He was the son of Festus Kelly (c. 1759 – 7 October 1831) from County Galway in the west of Ireland, formerly a captain in the 96th Regiment of Foot. His brother Edward Robert Kelly is recorded as being born in 1817 and the 4th son of Colonel Festus Kelly of Middlesex.

He resided at Chessington Lodge and at 32, Bedford Square, London; at his death his residence was given as Oakhurst, Castlebar Hill, Ealing. He married Harriet, daughter of John Richards of Maida Vale. His elder son was the Rev. Frederic Festus Kelly, vicar of Camberwell, Surrey (1838–1918), whose children (his grandchildren) included the painter Sir Gerald Festus Kelly and Rose Edith Kelly, who married Aleister Crowley. His second son was the barrister and politician John Richards Kelly, who inherited his share and interests in the copyright of the Post Office Directory.

His elder daughter Harriet married the Rev. Hector Norton, vicar of Great Bentley, on 21 May 1867; his second daughter Fanny married Frederick William Headland on 10 August 1865. There was also a daughter named Rosa.
