= Gerald Kelly =

British painter (1879–1972)

Sir Gerald Kelly KCVO PRA
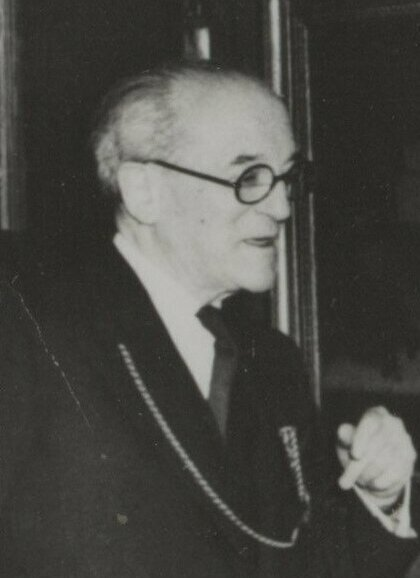
- Gerald Kelly in 1953
- Born: Gerald Festus Kelly; 9 April 1879; London, England
- Died: 5 January 1972 (aged 92); Exmouth, East Devon, England
- Known for: Painting
- Relatives: Rose Edith Kelly (sister)

Sir Gerald Festus Kelly KCVO PRA (9 April 1879 – 5 January 1972) was a British painter best known for his portraits. His sister, Rose Edith Kelly, was briefly married to Aleister Crowley.

== Early life and education ==
Gerald Kelly was born in London. His father was the Rev. Frederic Festus Kelly (1838–1918), formerly the vicar at St Giles', Camberwell where the young Kelly grew up. His grandfather, also named Frederic Festus Kelly, was the founder of Kelly's Directories Ltd.

Kelly was educated at Eton College and Trinity Hall, Cambridge, and later lived and studied art in Paris. James McNeill Whistler was an early influence. Kelly travelled much, visiting Spain, America, South Africa, and Burma, which inspired a series of paintings of Burmese dancers.

== Career ==
In 1920 he married Lilian Ryan, who became his model for a celebrated series of portraits. These were exhibited under the title Jane, followed by a Roman numeral that corresponded to the year of exhibition. Other sitters included T. S. Eliot, Ralph Vaughan Williams, and Somerset Maugham, whom he painted 18 times.

Maugham, a lifelong friend of Kelly, wrote an introduction to a catalogue (1950) of an exhibition of Kelly's work. Maugham regularly portrayed Kelly in his works, as Lionel Hillier in Cakes and Ale, as Frederick Lawson in Of Human Bondage and as O'Malley in His Excellency presenting him as "the young Irish painter called O'Malley", and dedicating Ashenden to him.

He became a favourite painter of the Royal Family. During the Round Table Conferences in London, he encountered Shan princess Sao Ohn Nyunt. Struck by her grace and beauty, Kelly convinced her to pose for a series of portraits that would become some of his most celebrated works. Although he served as the court painter to the Royal Family during World War II, it was the 20 portraits of Sao Ohn Nyut that brought him unparalleled acclaim. These portraits, reproduced as posters, have sold over 50,000 copies and remain available to this day.

He was elected to the Royal Academy in 1930, was the Academy's Keeper from 1943–45, and served as its president from 1949–54. Kelly held a number of official positions, such as his membership of the Royal Fine Arts Commission, 1938–43, and was knighted in the 1945 King's Birthday Honours List. The artist John Napper (1916–2001) worked as his assistant. In 1950 he was elected to the National Academy of Design as an Honorary Corresponding Academician.

== Death and legacy ==
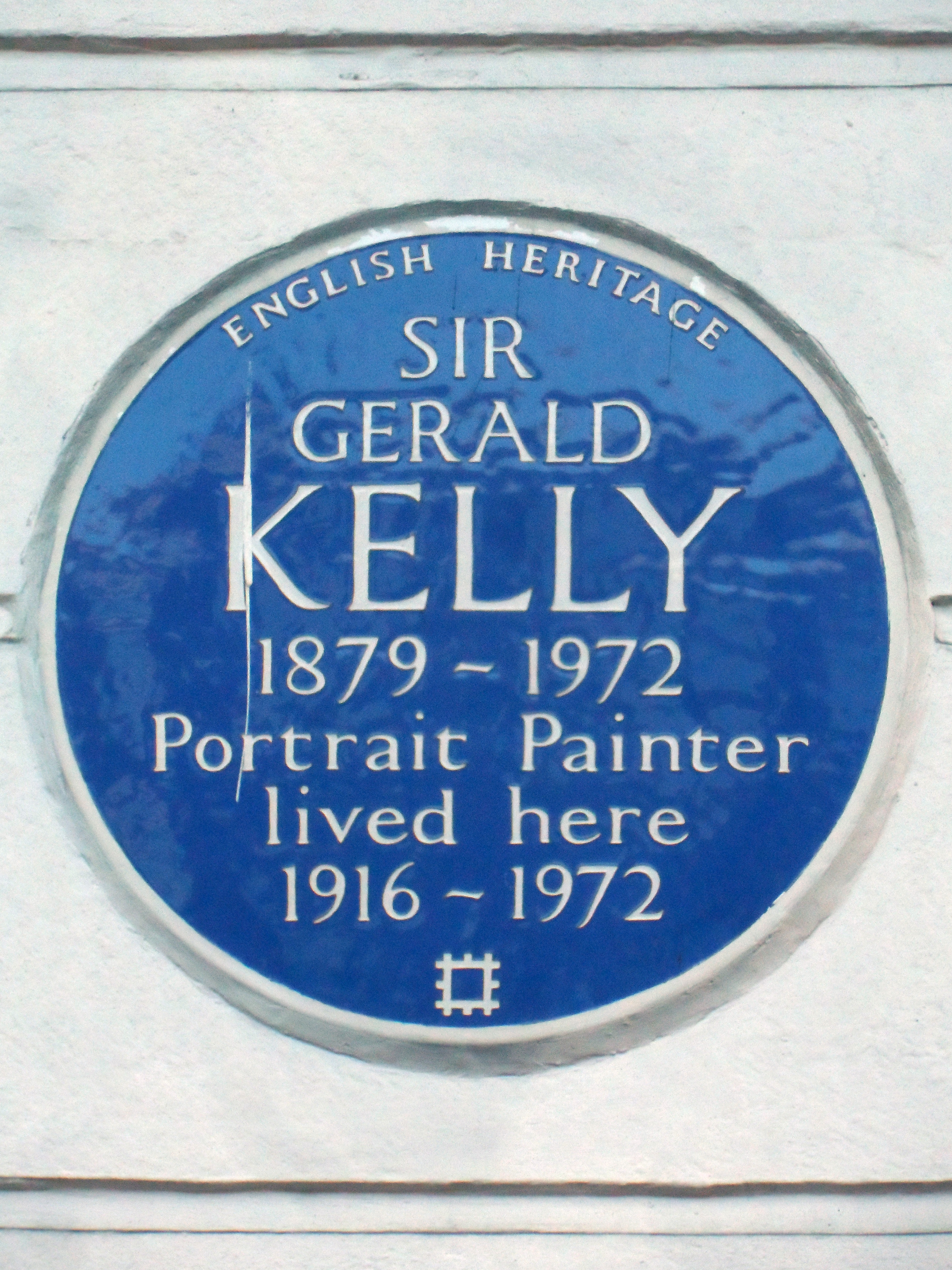
Kelly's English Heritage blue plaque at Gloucester Place in Marylebone, London

Kelly died in Exmouth in 1972. He is represented in many public collections, including the Tate Gallery, which holds seven works.

Kelly's London residence at 117 Gloucester Place in Marylebone is marked by an English Heritage blue plaque placed in 1993.

== Notes ==
Cultural offices
Preceded by Sir Alfred Munnings	President of the Royal Academy; 1949–1954	Succeeded by Albert Richardson
