= Michael Powell =

English film director (1905–1990)

- Born: Michael Latham Powell; 30 September 1905; Bekesbourne, Kent, England
- Died: 19 February 1990 (aged 84); Avening, Gloucestershire, England
- Occupations: Film director; producer; screenwriter
- Years active: 1925–1983
- Spouses: Gloria Mary Rouger (m. 1927; div. 1927) Frankie Reidy (m. 1943; died 1983) Thelma Schoonmaker (m. 1984)
- Partner(s): Pamela Brown (1962; died 1975)
- Children: 2

Michael Latham Powell (30 September 1905 – 19 February 1990) was an English filmmaker. He is celebrated for his partnership with Emeric Pressburger and through their production company, The Archers, they together wrote, produced and directed a series of classic British films, notably The Life and Death of Colonel Blimp (1943), A Canterbury Tale (1944), I Know Where I'm Going! (1945), A Matter of Life and Death (1946, Stairway to Heaven in the U.S.), Black Narcissus (1947), The Red Shoes (1948), and The Tales of Hoffmann (1951).

Powell's controversial film Peeping Tom (1960), which was so vilified on first release that it seriously damaged his career, is now considered a classic, and possibly the earliest "slasher movie". Many renowned filmmakers such as Francis Ford Coppola, George A. Romero, Brian De Palma, Bertrand Tavernier, and Martin Scorsese have cited Powell as an influence.

In 1981, Powell and Pressburger received the BAFTA Fellowship, the highest honour the British Academy of Film and Television Arts can bestow upon a filmmaker. Five of their films were featured on the British Film Institute's list of 100 Greatest British films. In 2024, their work was explored in the documentary Made in England: The Films of Powell and Pressburger, narrated by Scorsese. Film critic David Thomson wrote that "there is not a British director with as many worthwhile films to his credit as Michael Powell."

== Early life ==
Powell was the second son and youngest child of Thomas William Powell, a hop farmer born in the Welsh Marches, and Mabel, daughter of Frederick Corbett, of Worcester, England. Powell was born in Bekesbourne, Kent, and educated at The King's School, Canterbury and then at Dulwich College. He started work at the National Provincial Bank in 1922 but quickly realised he was not cut out to be a banker.

== Film career ==
Powell entered the film industry in 1925 through working with director Rex Ingram at the Victorine Studios in Nice, France (the contact with Ingram was made through Powell's father, who owned a hotel in Nice). He first started out as a general studio hand, the proverbial "gofer": sweeping the floor, making coffee, fetching and carrying. Soon he progressed to other work such as stills photography, writing titles (for the silent films) and many other jobs including a few acting roles, usually as comic characters. Powell made his film début as a "comic English tourist" in The Magician (1926).

Returning to England in 1928, Powell worked at a diverse series of jobs for various filmmakers including as a stills photographer on Alfred Hitchcock's silent film Champagne (1928). He also signed on in a similar role on Hitchcock's first "talkie", Blackmail (1929). In his autobiography, Powell claims he suggested the ending in the British Museum which was the first of Hitchcock's "monumental" climaxes to his films. Powell and Hitchcock remained friends for the remainder of Hitchcock's life. (Note: It was Hitchcock who suggested using Kim Hunter in A Matter of Life and Death.)

After scriptwriting on two productions, Powell entered into a partnership with American producer Jerry Jackson in 1931 to make "quota quickies", hour-long films needed to satisfy a legal requirement that British cinemas screen a certain quota of British films. During this period, he developed his directing skills, sometimes making up to seven films a year.

Although he had taken on some directing responsibilities in other films, Powell had his first screen credit as a director on Two Crowded Hours (1931). This thriller was considered a modest success at the box office despite its limited budget. From 1931 to 1936, Powell was the director of 23 films, including the critically received Red Ensign (1934) and The Phantom Light (1935).

In 1937 Powell completed his first truly personal project, The Edge of the World. Powell gathered together a cast and crew who were willing to take part in an expedition to what was then a very isolated part of the UK. They had to stay there for quite a few months and finished up with a film which not only told the story he wanted but also captured the raw natural beauty of the location.

By 1939, Powell had been hired as a contract director by Alexander Korda on the strength of The Edge of the World. Korda set him to work on some projects such as Burmese Silver that were subsequently cancelled. Nonetheless, Powell was brought in to save a film that was being made as a vehicle for two of Korda's star players, Conrad Veidt and Valerie Hobson. The film was The Spy in Black, during pre-production of which Powell first met Emeric Pressburger in 1939.

=== Meeting Emeric Pressburger ===
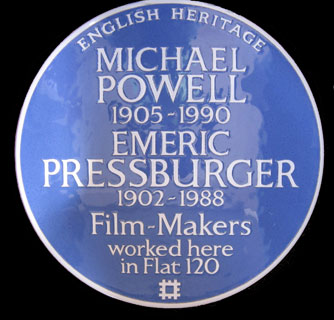
English Heritage blue plaque at Dorset House in Marylebone, central London

The original script of The Spy in Black followed the book quite closely, but was too verbose and did not have a good role for either Veidt or Hobson. Korda called a meeting where he introduced a diminutive man, saying, "Well now, I have asked Emeric to read the script, and he has things to say to us."

Powell then went on to record (in A Life in Movies) how:

Emeric produced a very small piece of rolled-up paper, and addressed the meeting. I listened spellbound. Since talkies took over the movies, I had worked with some good writers, but I had never met anything like this. In the silent days, the top [American] screenwriters were technicians rather than dramatists ... the European cinema remained highly literate and each country, conscious of its separate culture and literature, strove to outdo the other. All this was changed by the talkies. America, with its enormous wealth and enthusiasm and its technical resources, waved the big stick. ... The European film no longer existed. ... Only the great German film business was prepared to fight the American monopoly, and Dr. Goebbels soon put a stop to that in 1933. But the day that Emeric walked out of his flat, leaving the key in the door to save the storm-troopers the trouble of breaking it down, was the worst day's work that the clever doctor ever did for his country's reputation, as he was soon to find out. As I said, I listened spellbound to this small Hungarian wizard, as Emeric unfolded his notes, until they were at least six inches long. He had stood Storer Clouston's plot on its head and completely restructured the film.

They both soon recognised that although they were total opposites in background and personality, they had a common attitude to film-making and that they could work very well together. After making two more films together, Contraband (1940) and 49th Parallel (1941), with separate credits, the pair decided to form a partnership and to sign their films jointly as "Written, Produced and Directed by Michael Powell and Emeric Pressburger."

=== The Archers ===
Working together as co-producers, writers and directors in a partnership they dubbed "The Archers", they made 19 feature films, many of which received critical and commercial success. Their best films are still regarded as classics of 20th-century British cinema. The BFI 100 list of "the favourite British films of the 20th century" contains five of Powell's films, four with Pressburger. Thomson writes that Powell and Pressburger "struggle with great, clashing virtues—with marvelous visual imagination and uneasy, intellectual substance. I Know Where I'm Going is a genuinely superstitious picture; 49th Parallel is a strange war odyssey, with escaping Germans wandering across Canada—naïve, very violent, at times unwittingly comic, but possessed by a primitive feeling for endangered civilization; an interesting sequel is One of Our Aircraft is Missing—English fliers getting out of Holland; A Matter of Life and Death is pretentious in its way, yet very funny and absolutely secure in its dainty stepping from one world to another ... The Thief of Bagdad is delightful, The Life and Death of Colonel Blimp a beautiful salute to Englishness ... Black Narcissus is that rare thing, an erotic English film about the fantasies of nuns." The partnership ended after Ill Met By Moonlight.

Although admirers would argue that Powell ought to rank alongside fellow British directors Alfred Hitchcock and David Lean, his career suffered a severe reversal after the release of the controversial psychological thriller film Peeping Tom, made in 1960 as a solo effort. The film was excoriated by mainstream British critics, who were offended by its sexual and violent images. The film did, however, meet with the rapturous approval of the young critics of Positif and Midi Minuit Fantastique in France, and those of Motion in England, and in 1965 he was subject of a major positive revaluation by Raymond Durgnat in the auteurist magazine Movie, later included in Durgnat's influential book A Mirror for England.

Powell made two films in Australia, They're a Weird Mob and Age of Consent.

=== Zoetrope Studios ===
In 1982, Francis Ford Coppola invited Powell to be 'senior director in residence' at his Zoetrope Studios. There, Powell "pottered around", including starting to write his autobiography. Powell's films came to have a cult reputation, broadened during the 1970s and early 1980s by a series of retrospectives and rediscoveries, as well as further articles and books. By the time of his death, he and Pressburger were recognised as one of the foremost film partnerships of all time – and cited as a key influence by many noted filmmakers such as Martin Scorsese and Brian De Palma.

== Personal life ==
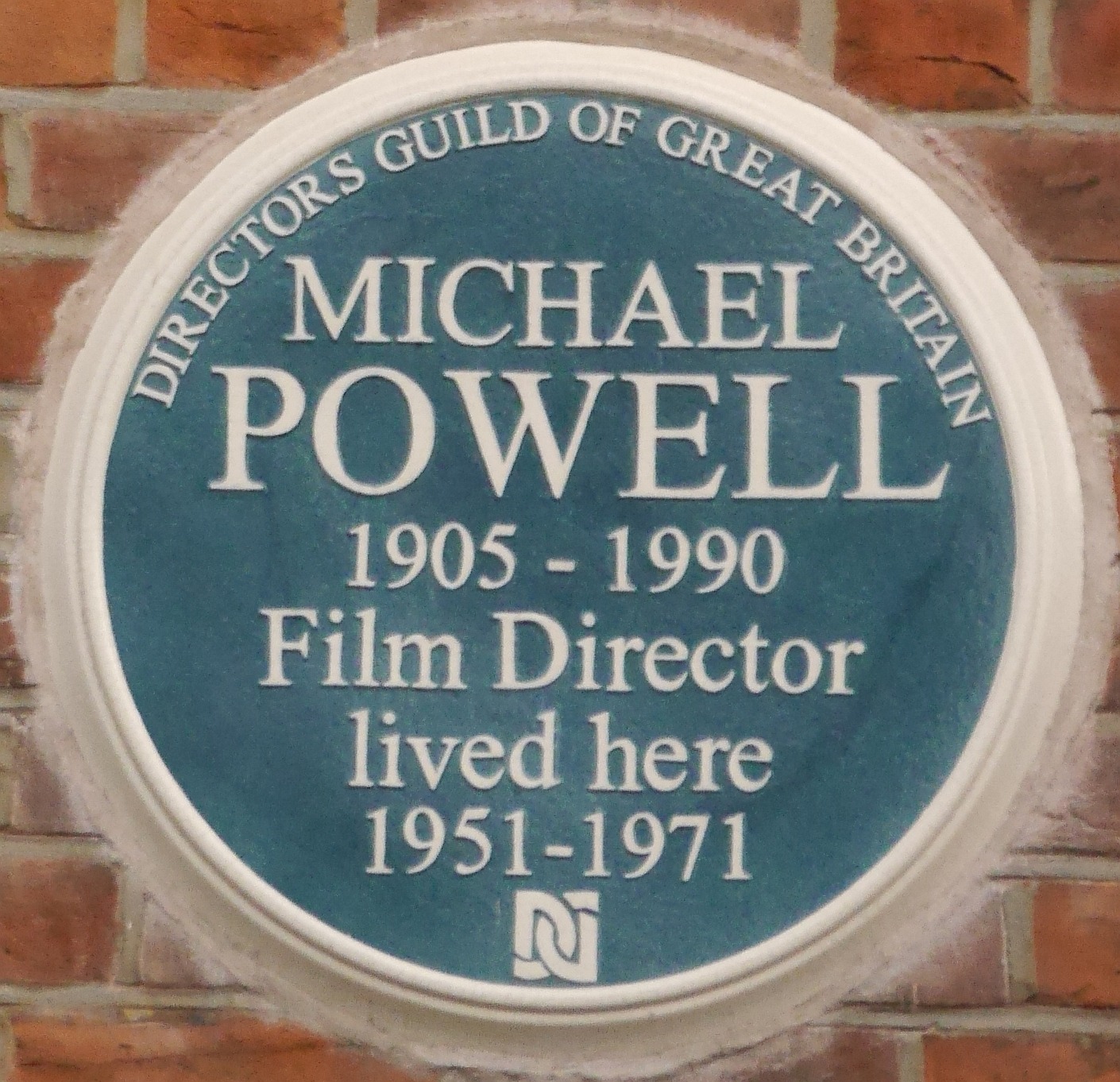
8 Melbury Road plaque in Holland Park, Kensington, central London

In 1927 Powell married Gloria Mary Rouger, an American dancer; they were married in France and stayed together for only three weeks. During the 1940s, Powell had love affairs with actresses Deborah Kerr and Kathleen Byron. From 1 July 1943 until her death on 5 July 1983, Powell was married to Frances "Frankie" May Reidy, the daughter of medical practitioner Jerome Reidy; they had two sons: Kevin Michael Powell (b. 1945) and Columba Jerome Reidy Powell (b. 1951). He also lived with actress Pamela Brown for many years until her death from cancer in 1975.

Powell was introduced to film editor Thelma Schoonmaker by Martin Scorsese and London-based film producer Frixos Constantine. The couple were married from 19 May 1984 until his own death from cancer on 19 February 1990 at his home in Avening, Gloucestershire. The couple had no children.

His niece was the Australian actress Cornelia Frances, who appeared in bit parts in her uncle's early films.

== Preservation ==
The Academy Film Archive has preserved A Matter of Life and Death and The Life and Death of Colonel Blimp by Michael Powell and Emeric Pressburger.

== Awards, nominations and honours ==
- 1943: Oscar nominated for 49th Parallel as Best Picture
- 1943: Oscar nominated for One of Our Aircraft Is Missing for Best Writing, Original Screenplay. Shared with Emeric Pressburger
- 1948: Won Danish Bodil Award for A Matter of Life and Death as Best European Film. Shared with Emeric Pressburger
- 1948 Nominated for The Red Shoes for Venice Film Festival Golden Lion. Shared with Emeric Pressburger
- 1949: Oscar nominated for The Red Shoes as Best Picture. Shared with Emeric Pressburger
- 1951: Cannes Film Festival nominated for The Tales of Hoffmann for Grand Prize of the Festival. Shared with Emeric Pressburger
- 1951: Won Silver Bear from 1st Berlin International Film Festival for The Tales of Hoffmann as Best Musical. Shared with Emeric Pressburger
- 1957: BAFTA Award nominated for The Battle of the River Plate as Best British Screenplay. Shared with Emeric Pressburger.
- 1959: Cannes Film Festival won the Technical Grand Prize for Luna de Miel. Nominated for Golden Palm.
- 1978: Awarded Hon DLitt, University of East Anglia
- 1978: Awarded Hon DLitt, University of Kent
- 1981: Made fellow of BAFTA
- 1982: Awarded Career Gold Lion from the Venice Film Festival
- 1983: Made fellow of the British Film Institute (BFI)
- 1987: Awarded Hon Doctorate, Royal College of Art
- 1987: Awarded Akira Kurosawa Award from San Francisco International Film Festival
- 2014: An English Heritage Blue plaque to commemorate Michael Powell and Emeric Pressburger was unveiled on 17 February 2014 by Martin Scorsese and Thelma Schoonmaker at Dorset House, Gloucester Place, London NW1 5AG where The Archers had their offices from 1942 to 1947.

== Legacy ==
David Thomson writes:

I was fortunate enough to know Michael Powell in the last decade of his life. he was in America a good deal at that time: teaching for a term at Dartmouth; as director emeritus with Coppola's American Zoetrope, as treasured Merlin in the court of Scorsese; and in his marriage to the editor, Thelma Schoonmaker. I had the chance to watch many of his films with him, discussing them and learning the passion of his vision. It is all the more agreeable now to see Michael's influence spreading: the ardent antirealist has inspired so many people; the man in love with color, gesture, and cinema helped to educate viewers as well as filmmakers—not lest in the two volumes of his autobiography, A Life in Movies ... The great Powell and Pressburger films do not go stale; they never relinquish their wicked fun or that jaunty air of being poised on the brink. To put an arrow in our eye—to leave a nurturing wound—that was Michael's eternal thrill. I do not invoke the figure of Merlin lightly: Powell was English but Celtic, sublime yet devious, magical in the absolute certainty that imagination rules.

- He is cited as a major influence on many filmmakers such as Francis Ford Coppola, George A. Romero, Brian De Palma, Bertrand Tavernier, Martin Scorsese, and Ridley Scott. Thelma Schoonmaker (Scorsese's long-time film editor and Powell's third wife) said of Scorsese, "Anyone he meets, or the actors he works with, he immediately starts bombarding with Powell and Pressburger movies." In 2014, Scorsese and Schoonmaker were working on restoring Powell's films, beginning with The Red Shoes and The Life and Death of Colonel Blimp.
- The Michael Powell Award for the Best New British Feature was instigated in 1993 at the Edinburgh International Film Festival (awarded 1993–2010 and 2012–2021). It was sponsored by the UK Film Council and was "named in homage to one of Britain's most original filmmakers".
- Pinewood Studios, where Powell made many of his most notable films, has named a mixing theatre in the post-production department after him: The Powell Theatre. A giant picture of the director covers the door to the theatre, where many well-known films are mixed.
- The Film, Radio and Television Department of Canterbury Christ Church University has its main building named after him: The Powell Building.
- He has been played on screen by Alastair Thomson Mills in the award-winning short film Òran na h-Eala (2022) which explores Moira Shearer's life changing decision to appear in The Red Shoes.
- A celebration entitled 'Cinema Unbound: The Creative Worlds of Powell and Pressburger' was held by the British Film Institute in 2023, including a UK-wide programme of films and an exhibit of production and promotion materials from The Red Shoes.
- Powell's work was explored in the documentary Made in England: The Films of Powell and Pressburger (2024), with narration by Martin Scorsese.

== Theatre ==
- 1944: Directed Ernest Hemingway's The Fifth Column at the Theatre Royal, Glasgow
- 1944: Directed Jan de Hartog's Skipper Next To God at the Theatre Royal, Windsor
- 1951: Directed James Forsyth's Heloise at the Golders Green Hippodrome, London
- 1952: Directed Raymond Massey's Hanging Judge at the New Theatre, London

== Bibliography ==
- 1938: 200,000 Feet on Foula. London: Faber & Faber. (The story of the making of The Edge of the World.
  - Published as 200,000 Feet – The Edge of the World in the United States
  - Republished as Edge of the World in 1990.
- 1956: Graf Spee. London: Hodder & Stoughton. (This book contains much information that Powell and Pressburger could not include in their film The Battle of the River Plate.)
  - Published in the United States as Death in the South Atlantic: The Last Voyage of the Graf Spee in 1957.
  - Reprinted as The Last Voyage of the Graf Spee for the 1976 paperback edition.
- 1975: A Waiting Game. London: Joseph. ISBN 0-7181-1368-3.
- 1978: (with Emeric Pressburger) The Red Shoes. London: Avon Books. ISBN 0-8044-2687-2. (novelization of the film of the same name)
- 1986: A Life in Movies: An Autobiography. London: Heinemann. ISBN 0-434-59945-X. (Powell's memoirs of the years 1905-1948)
- 1992: Million Dollar Movie London: Heinemann. ISBN 0-434-59947-6. (Powell's memoirs of the years 1948-1989)
- 1994: The Life and Death of Colonel Blimp. (with Emeric Pressburger and Ian Christie) London: Faber & Faber. ISBN 0-571-14355-5. (The screenplay of the film.)

Many of these titles were also published in other countries or republished. The list above deals with initial publications except where the name was changed in a subsequent edition or printing.
