= Dorset House, Marylebone =

Apartment building in Marylebone, London

Coordinates: 51.5224°N 0.1592°W

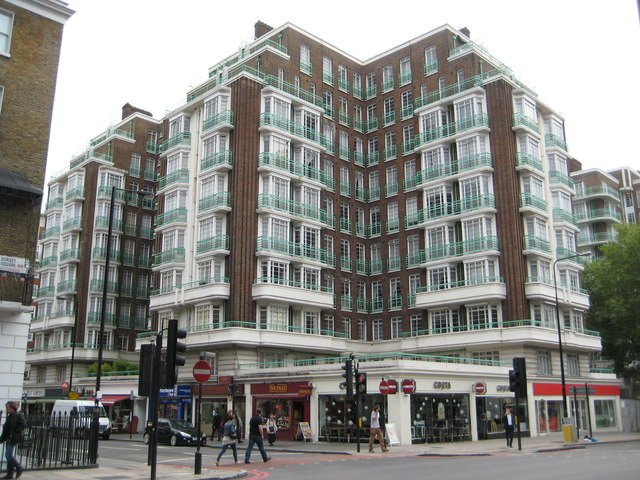
Dorset House from Marylebone Road in 2012

Dorset House is an apartment block in Marylebone in the City of Westminster. It is a noted example of Art Deco architecture and has been listed Grade II on the National Heritage List for England since March 1998. Dorset House occupies an entire block and is listed at the addresses of 128-130 Gloucester Place, 148-168 Marylebone Road, 1-9 Glentworth Street and 31-37 Melcombe Street.

It was designed by the architects T P Bennett and Son under the architect Joseph Emberton for the property developer Claude Leigh. It was completed in 1935. Dorset House features reliefs by the sculptor and designer Eric Gill.

An English Heritage blue plaque for the filmmakers Michael Powell and Emeric Pressburger was erected on Dorset House in 2014.
