= Liverpool Evening Express =

- Founded: 1870; 155 years ago
- Ceased publication: 1958
- City: Liverpool
- Country: United Kingdom

The Liverpool Evening Express was a local newspaper that circulated in Liverpool, England from 1870 to 1958. Originally published by Tinling C & Co. Ltd, the paper merged with the Liverpool Echo in 1958.
