= Gloucester Place =

Street in Central London

Coordinates: 51.52072°N 0.16091°W

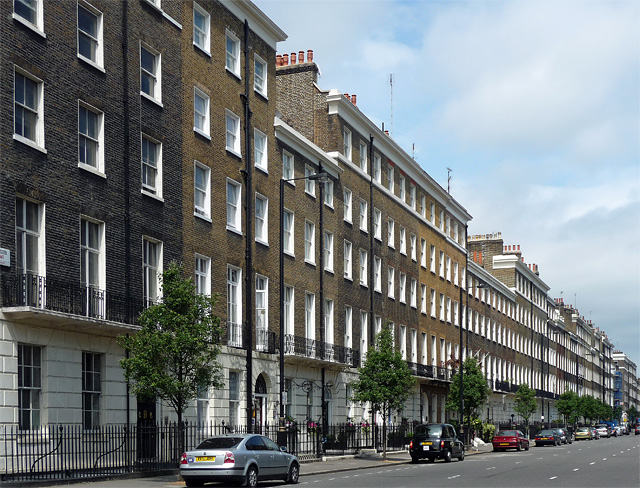
Georgian terraced housing in the street.

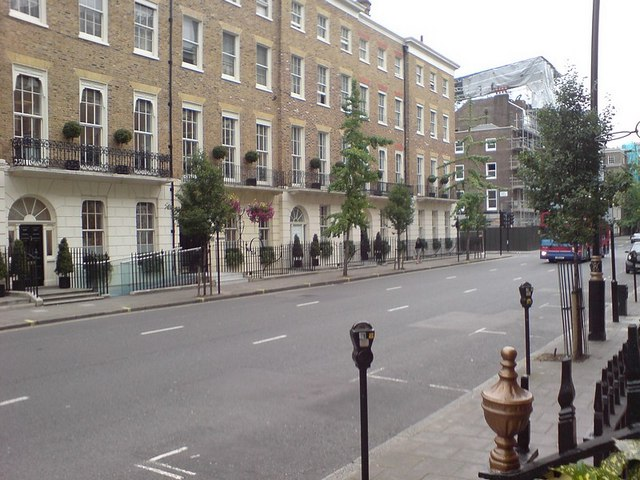
Looking south towards George Street.

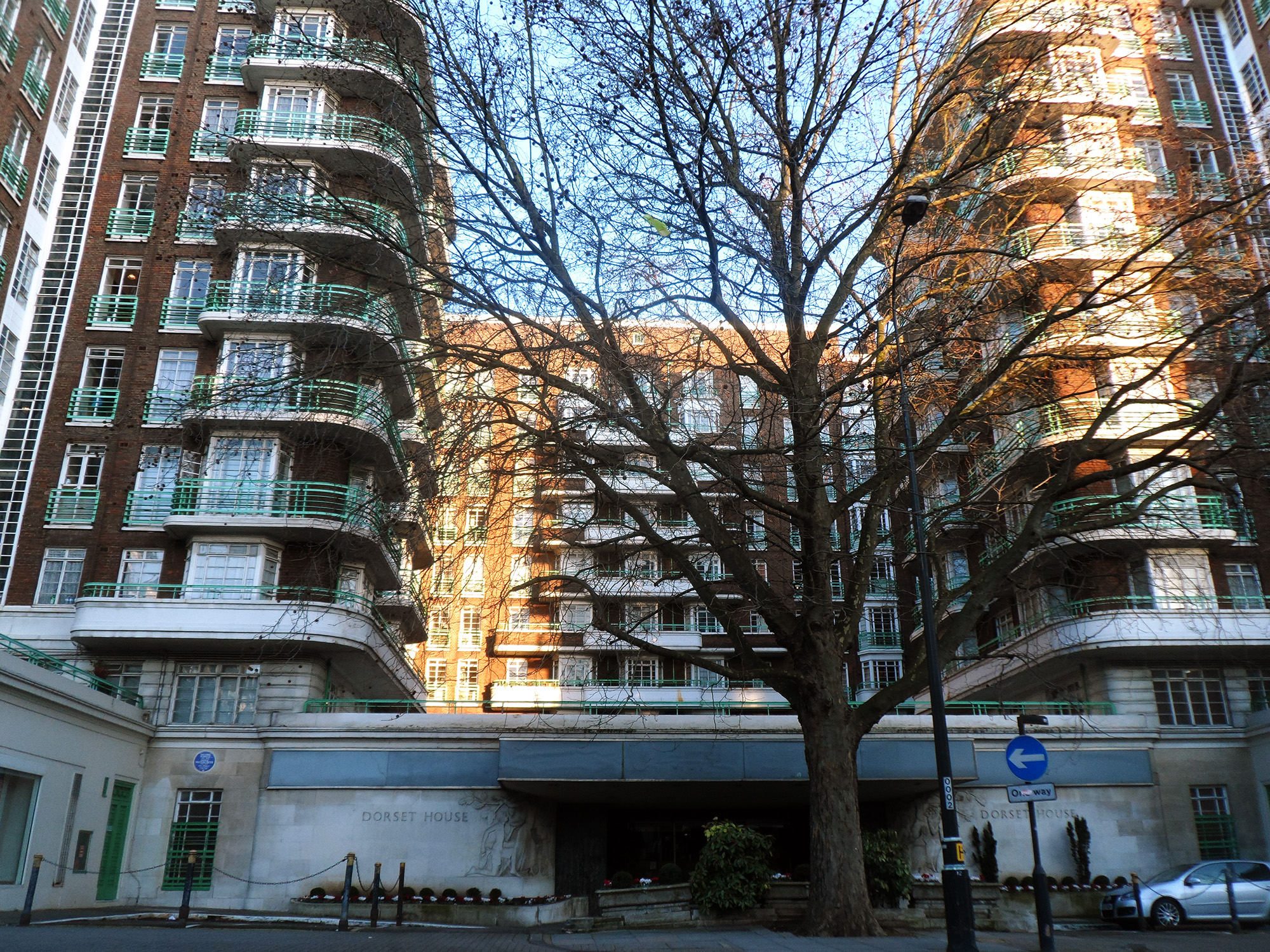
1930s art deco Dorset House. Blue plaque for Powell and Pressburger on the left.

Gloucester Place is a street in Marylebone in Central London. Located in the City of Westminster, it runs north from Portman Square across the Marylebone Road eventually merging into Park Road. It is parallel to Baker Street to the east and forms part of the A41 road from nearby Marble Arch.

The Portman Estate was developed into grids of streets for affluent residential housing from the mid-eighteenth century. Gloucester Place was named after the Duke of Gloucester, younger brother of George III. The street has largely kept its original Georgian character. For some of the route the street is paralleled by Gloucester Place Mews to the west. Once part of the mews stabling for the houses, it now consists of independent dwellings. The 1935 art deco Dorset House apartment block was completed in 1935 at the junction with Marylebone Road. On the opposite corner of the junction is the neo classical Marylebone Town Hall the side of which faces onto Gloucester Place.

Notable historic residents have included Mary Anne Clarke the mistress of Frederick, Duke of York and the American General Benedict Arnold. Novelist Wilkie Collins lived at 65 Gloucester Place where a blue plaque commemorates him. Another blue plaque appears on Dorset House where Michael Powell and Emeric Pressburger's film production company was headquartered during the 1940s.

== Bibliography ==
- Bebbington, Gillian. London Street Names. Batsford, 1972.
- Dargan, Pat. Georgian London: The West End. Amberley Publishing Limited, 2012.
- Fenn, Violet. Secrets and Scandals in Regency Britain: Sex, Drugs and Proxy Rule. Pen and Sword History, 2022.
- Merrill, Jane & Endicott, John. The Late Years of Benedict Arnold: Fugitive, Smuggler, Mercenary, 1780–1801. McFarland, 2022.
