= Roy Douglas =

English composer, pianist and arranger (1907–2015)

Background information
- Born: Richard Roy Douglas; 12 December 1907; Tunbridge Wells, Kent, England
- Died: 23 March 2015 (aged 107) Royal Tunbridge Wells, Kent, England
- Occupations: Composer, musician, arranger
- Instruments: Piano and percussion

Richard Roy Douglas (12 December 1907 – 23 March 2015) was an English composer, pianist and arranger. He worked as musical assistant to William Walton and Ralph Vaughan Williams, made well-known orchestrations of works such as Les Sylphides (based on piano pieces by Chopin) and Richard Addinsell's Warsaw Concerto, and wrote a quantity of original music.

== Life and career ==
=== Early years ===
Roy Douglas was born in Tunbridge Wells, Kent, on 12 December 1907, the youngest of the three children of Edith Ella Douglas, née Charlton, and her husband, Richard Moses Douglas, a buyer and manager in a furnishing company. His involvement with music began early: as a five-year-old he would listen to his sister playing in her piano lessons and then seat himself at the piano and play by ear. His mother decided that he too should have piano lessons. An attack of rheumatic fever left him with a damaged heart, and the doctors said he was unlikely to live to adulthood. His fragile health meant that he received little formal education, but when well enough, he spent many hours playing the piano, "reading at sight everything I could find from Beethoven to ragtime"

After the family moved to Folkestone in 1915 Douglas played in local concerts and at twenty he joined the Folkestone Municipal Orchestra. He was harmonium player, deputy pianist, celesta player, extra percussionist, librarian and programme-planner, for the pay of £6 a week for 14 performances and two rehearsals. When the local council cut the orchestral players' pay, Douglas left to pursue a career in London. The family moved to Highgate, and he secured engagements with the London Symphony Orchestra (LSO), which admitted him to full membership in 1933 as pianist, celesta player, organist, fourth percussionist and librarian.

=== 1930s ===
With the LSO, Douglas played under conductors including John Barbirolli, Adrian Boult, Hamilton Harty, Malcolm Sargent, Bruno Walter and Sir Henry Wood. He also played in ballet and opera seasons in the West End. By his own reckoning he played the piano part in Stravinsky's Petrushka 80 times, and he recalled that in the "Polovtsian Dances" from Borodin's Prince Igor, "I played triangle and tambourine, both parts together, one with each hand". In addition to playing in the LSO, he was also the pianist for some West End shows and occasionally played at the Savoy Hotel to entertain diners.

In 1932 a friend, the violinist and conductor Rae Jenkins, rang Douglas to say that a film director needed a score based on Indian music for a forthcoming film. Douglas recalled, "I didn't know anything about Indian music and I'd never written for a film, but I took the job on". After this film, Karma, Douglas composed scores for Dick Turpin (1933), released in 1934, and five other films between then and 1943. During the 1930s Douglas assisted other film composers including Mischa Spoliansky (The Ghost Goes West, 1935), Arthur Benjamin (Wings of the Morning, 1937) and Anthony Collins (Sixty Glorious Years, 1938).

Douglas first broadcast on BBC radio in 1935 as the pianist of the Cellini Trio, with two LSO colleagues: Gordon Walker (flute) and Geraint Williams (cello). From 1936 to 1939 his arrangements featured in regular broadcasts by the Broadhurst Septet (Note: Ernest Broadhurst had been the musical director for Karma, Douglas's first film score.) in chamber versions of orchestral or solo piano music. By 1938 he was a familiar name to radio listeners; introducing a concert of chamber music that featured one of his compositions, The Radio Times said:

Roy Douglas, pianist of the Cellini Trio, is a frequent broadcaster, appearing in almost every kind of programme from orchestral concerts to chamber music and accompanying. Mr Douglas has written orchestral music, film music, orchestrated the ballet Les Sylphides for the René Blum ballet company, and among his most notable chamber compositions are the Trio for flute, violin, and viola, and the present Quartet, both of which were written expressly for the Lyra Quartet.

The orchestration of Chopin's piano music used in Les Sylphides was done in nine days in 1936. Douglas wrote that he was "disgusted and horrified by the many bad orchestrations" of the music and made his own orchestration. He was offered a one-off payment of £10 for it, but refused to part with the copyright. As his version was taken up by most leading ballet companies round the world, royalties from it provided him with a substantial income for the rest of his life.

=== 1940s ===
Douglas helped other film composers, often uncredited, assisting with the score for Noël Coward's In Which We Serve, and orchestrating scores by Richard Addinsell, including the Warsaw Concerto in Dangerous Moonlight. He and Addinsell also collaborated on Gaslight and The Day Will Dawn. According to Douglas's obituary in The Daily Telegraph he orchestrated all Addinsell's music for eight BBC radio programmes and twenty-four films. The LSO played many composers' scores for films during the Second World War, and Douglas came to work with Alan Rawsthorne, John Ireland and, most importantly for his later activities, William Walton.

Douglas first worked with Walton in 1940, when the latter was revising the score of his 1939 Violin Concerto after the orchestral parts were found to be full of errors. Douglas and violinist Henry Holst worked on the score with the composer between August and October. Walton's biographer Michael Kennedy writes that over the next thirty-two years, Douglas helped prepare almost all of Walton’s works for performance and publication:

correcting mistakes in proofs and parts and, on occasion, orchestrating some of the film music. Most of the sections he scored were comparatively short, seldom more than twenty or thirty bars, sometimes as few as eight or ten.

When orchestrating these bars of Walton's film scores, Douglas based his work on the composer's outline sketches, following specific instructions or orchestrating in Walton's style. The Walton film scores on which Douglas worked included those for Gabriel Pascal's film of Bernard Shaw's Major Barbara (1941), The Next of Kin, (1942), Went the Day Well? (1942), Leslie Howard's The First of the Few (1942), and Laurence Olivier's Henry V (1944), on which he played the harpsichord on the soundtrack. He assisted Walton with the orchestration of the score for the radio play Christopher Columbus (1942). For the live theatre, he and Ernest Irving helped Walton complete the ballet The Quest for its premiere performance in 1943. Walton was invited to compose the score for The Bells Go Down but declined; however, he secured the commission for Douglas to write the music. Douglas also gave Walton some lessons in conducting, and deputised for him as conductor at one recording session for the Henry V music.

In 1946 Douglas undertook what The Times described as "his last official project in the film industry", orchestrating the theme music for David Lean's Great Expectations.

The following year Douglas began an association with Ralph Vaughan Williams. Douglas had earlier copied out the composer's score for the film Coastal Command after the film studio found the original manuscript undecipherable: Vaughan Williams's handwriting was notoriously illegible (Douglas described it as "like spiders crawling all over the page"). In 1944, at the composer's request, Douglas had made a reduced score of Vaughan Williams's Thanksgiving for Victory so it could be performed by choral societies that could not afford the original version with full symphony orchestra. A close collaboration began in 1947, when the composer, wishing to consult Douglas about scoring for films, sent a postcard inviting him to the Vaughan Williamses' country home: "All I could read was: 'The White Gates, Dorking', and the telephone number, so I rang up and asked him what the card was about". Douglas visited the composer and gave him technical advice, such as "you must never have oboe solos over dialogue because it didn't mix on the soundtrack". Vaughan Williams said to him that he had "been foolish enough to write another symphony [i.e. No. 6, in E minor]. Could you undertake to vet and then copy the score?" The published score bears the note, "The composer wishes to acknowledge with thanks the help of Mr Roy Douglas in preparing the orchestral score".

In 1948 Douglas pointed out to Walton's publisher, the Oxford University Press (OUP), that there were more than eighty errors in the published score of Walton's cantata, Belshazzar's Feast. Douglas worked with Walton on correcting the score; during the revision the composer took out much of the percussion, to Douglas's regret.

=== 1950s ===
Douglas's close association with Walton and Vaughan Williams continued in the 1950s. When the latter's Sinfonia Antartica was in preparation in 1952, Douglas went to Dorking to help. The composer's wife Ursula recalled:

Roy had been helping him for some years and had developed an unerring understanding of Ralph’s calligraphy, which he translated into his own clear writing, as well as coming to play works through, advising on questionable points of instrumentation and bringing all his skill and musicianship to Ralph’s help.

Douglas helped Vaughan Williams with his 1951 opera The Pilgrim's Progress.

The piano reduction for the vocal score of Walton's opera Troilus and Cressida was largely Douglas's work. (Note: Franz Reizenstein made the piano reduction for parts of Act III.) After the first rehearsal of the opera at Covent Garden it was abandoned because of multiple errors in the printed orchestral parts; Douglas counted more than two hundred and dissuaded the furious Walton from breaking with the OUP and going to their rivals, Boosey and Hawkes.

Douglas worked with Vaughan Williams on symphonies nos. 7–9, the Tuba Concerto and other works. In this way he was able to produce manuscripts that were even more authoritative than the composer's originals, as all issues of notation had been discussed and clarified with the composer himself. Douglas was not generally involved with the composer's new works until they had been substantially sketched in short score. For example, he was first made aware that RVW had written a Sixth Symphony in a letter from the composer dated 13 February 1947, but he was not given the score to work on until almost seven months later. In an apparent departure from the usual method, Douglas was asked to write out the score for the Tuba Concerto in 12 days to meet a deadline, but without the opportunity of checking with the composer's piano sketches. This later led to uncertainties of scoring, which had to be clarified.

Sometimes Douglas's involvement with Vaughan Williams's works became more than that of an assistant. Vaughan Williams considered the orchestral suite arranged in 1952 from his 1949 cantata Folk Songs of the Four Seasons to be so much the work of Douglas that he arranged for it to be published as Douglas's composition based on his own, rather than his own arrangement of an earlier work. This was first recorded in 2012.

Douglas's association with Walton continued in the later 1950s and the 1960s. Before the British premiere of the Cello Concerto in 1957, he worked with the soloist, Gregor Piatigorsky, on alterations to the solo cello part. He worked with Walton on the piano score and orchestral parts for the comic opera The Bear (1967).

=== Later years ===
Douglas's connection with Vaughan Williams continued after the composer's death in 1958. A Suite de Ballet found among Vaughan Williams's papers, thought to have been sketched in 1913 for the flautist Louis Fleury, was edited by Douglas and published in 1961. A lost score from 1939 was rediscovered in 1971 and edited by Douglas as Flourish for Wind Band. He edited the Prelude from Vaughan Williams's music for the 1941 film 49th Parallel, making a string version in 1960 and a brass band version in 1981.

Michael Kennedy's 1964 study The Works of Ralph Vaughan Williams carries the dedication, "To Roy Douglas, In memory of our friendship with RVW and in gratitude". In 1972 Douglas published a book of reminiscences, Working with RVW, later expanded as Working with Vaughan Williams (1988). The musicologist Byron Adams described it as "one of the most valuable books ever to appear on Vaughan Williams".

Douglas died at his home in Royal Tunbridge Wells, on 23 March 2015, aged 107. He never married; he lived with his sister Doris until her death in 1997.

== Major compositions ==
=== As composer ===
- Oboe quartet (1932)
- 2 quartets for flute, violin, viola and harp (1934/1938)
- Trio for flute, violin and viola (1935)
- Six Dance Caricatures for wind quintet (1939)
- Two Scottish Tunes for strings (1939)
- Elegy for strings (1945)
- Cantilena for strings (1957)
- Jubilate for organ (1964)
- Festivities, orchestral overture (1972)
- A Nowell Sequence for string orchestra or quartet (1991)
- scores for 5 feature and 6 documentary films
- music for 32 radio programmes

=== As arranger or orchestrator ===
- Richard Addinsell: the "Warsaw Concerto" from the film Dangerous Moonlight (1941)
- Lord Berners: ballet Les Sirènes (1946). The autograph score is entirely in Douglas's hand; he was sworn to secrecy about his involvement, uncredited, and poorly paid.
- Georges Bizet: Jeux d'enfants (5 numbers; these, along with 2 numbers orchestrated by Hershy Kay, were added to the 5 numbers scored by Bizet himself as his Petite Suite, to round out the complete orchestral version of Jeux d'enfants)
- Frédéric Chopin: Les Sylphides
- Franz Liszt: Funérailles
- Ralph Vaughan Williams: Songs of Travel (the composer orchestrated only the first, third and eighth songs, Douglas doing the remaining six songs)

== Notes, references and sources ==
=== Sources ===
- Adams, Byron; Robin Wells (2003). Vaughan Williams Essays. Farnham: Ashgate. ISBN 978-1-85-928387-5.
- Amory, Mark (1998). Lord Berners: The Last Eccentric. London: Faber and Faber. ISBN 978-0-57-124765-3.
- Frogley, Alain (2001). Vaughan Williams's Ninth Symphony. New York: Oxford University Press. ISBN 978-0-19-816284-1.
- Kennedy, Michael (1980) [1964]. The Music of Ralph Vaughan Williams (second ed.). London: Oxford University Press. ISBN 0-19-315453-6.
- Kennedy, Michael (1989). Portrait of Walton. Oxford: Oxford University Press. ISBN 978-0-19-816705-1.
- Kennedy, Michael (1996). A Catalogue of the Works of Ralph Vaughan Williams. Oxford and New York: Oxford University Press. ISBN 0-19-816584-6.
- Lloyd, Stephen (2002). William Walton: Muse of Fire. Woodbridge: Boydell. ISBN 978-0-85115-803-7.
- Vaughan Williams, Ursula (1965) [1964]. RVW: A Biography of Ralph Vaughan Williams. Oxford: Oxford University Press. ISBN 978-0-19-315411-7.
