= Darnborough =

Darnborough is a surname. Notable people with the surname include:

- Antony Darnborough (1913–2000), British film producer and director
- Hermione Darnborough (1915–2010), English ballerina
- William Nelson Darnborough (1869–1958), American gambler from Illinois
