= London Symphony Orchestra filmography =

The London Symphony Orchestra (LSO) has been associated with the cinema since the days of silent film. During the 1920s the orchestra played scores arranged and conducted by Eugene Goossens to accompany screenings of The Three Musketeers (1921), The Nibelungs (1924), The Life of Beethoven (1927) and The Constant Nymph (1928).

Since 1935 the LSO has recorded the musical scores of more than 200 films. The orchestra owed its engagement for its first run of soundtrack sessions to Muir Mathieson, musical director of Korda Studios. On the LSO's website, the film specialist Robert Rider calls Mathieson "the most important single figure in the early history of British film music, who enlisted Bliss to write a score for Things to Come, and who was subsequently responsible for bringing the most eminent British 20th-century composers to work for cinema." Mathieson described the LSO as "the perfect film orchestra". Among the composers commissioned by Mathieson for LSO soundtracks were Vaughan Williams, Walton, Britten and Malcolm Arnold and lighter composers including Eric Coates and Noël Coward.

As a pinnacle of Mathieson's collaboration with the LSO, Rider cites the 1946 film Instruments of the Orchestra, a film record of the LSO at work. Malcolm Sargent conducted the orchestra in a performance of Britten's The Young Person's Guide to the Orchestra, composed for the film. Rider adds, "Mathieson's documentary, with its close-ups of the musicians and their instruments, beautifully captures the vibrancy and texture of the Orchestra amidst the optimism of the post-Second World War era."

A later milestone in the LSO's history in film music was in 1977 with the recording of John Williams's score for the first of the nine Star Wars films. Rider comments that this film and its sequels "attracted a new group of admirers and consolidated the period of film music activity for the Orchestra, which continues unabated to this day". The LSO also recorded other Williams film scores, including Superman (1978), Raiders of the Lost Ark (1981), and Harry Potter and the Chamber of Secrets (2002).

== List ==
Title	Year	Composer(s)	Conductor(s)
Things to Come	1935	Arthur Bliss	Muir Mathieson
Sanders of the River	1935	Mischa Spolianski	Muir Mathieson
The Robber Symphony	1936	Friedrich Feher	Friedrich Feher
Elephant Boy	1937	John Greenwood	Muir Mathieson
Victoria the Great	1937	Anthony Collins	Muir Mathieson
The Mikado	1938	Arthur Sullivan	Geoffrey Toye
The Four Feathers	1939	Miklós Rózsa	Muir Mathieson
Music for the People	1940	Various	Sir Henry Wood
You Will Remember	1940	Various	Percival Mackey
Major Barbara	1941	William Walton	Muir Mathieson
Dangerous Moonlight (Note: Featured the Warsaw Concerto, with Louis Kentner as soloist)	1941	Richard Addinsell	Muir Mathieson
49th Parallel	1941	Ralph Vaughan Williams	Muir Mathieson
Jeannie	1941	Mischa Spolianski	Percival Mackey
The Common Touch	1941	Pyotr Ilyich Tchaikovsky	Kennedy Russell
The Day Will Dawn	1942	Richard Addinsell	Muir Mathieson
First of the Few	1942	William Walton	Muir Mathieson
In Which We Serve	1942	Noël Coward	Muir Mathieson
The Flemish Farm	1943	Ralph Vaughan Williams	Muir Mathieson
The People's Land	1943	Ralph Vaughan Williams	Muir Mathieson
The Gentle Sex	1943	John Greenwood	Muir Mathieson
Health of a Nation	1943	David Moule Evans	Muir Mathieson
I'll Walk Beside You	1943	?	Percival Mackey
Yellow Canary	1943	Clifton Parker	Muir Mathieson
Henry V	1944	William Walton	Muir Mathieson
This Happy Breed	1944	Noël Coward	Muir Mathieson
London Terminus	1944	Horace Somerville	Muir Mathieson
Salute the Soldier	1944	Eric Coates	Joe Batten
Out of Chaos	1944	Lennox Berkeley	Muir Mathieson
Men of Rochdale	1944	John Greenwood	Muir Mathieson
Song of the People	1944	Mischa Spoliansky	Muir Mathieson
Blithe Spirit	1945	Richard Addinsell	Muir Mathieson
The Second Freedom	1945	Hubert Clifford	Muir Mathieson
For You Alone	1945	?	Harry Bidgood
I Live in Grosvenor Square	1945	Anthony Collins	Muir Mathieson
Great Day	1945	William Alwyn	Muir Mathieson
29 Acacia Avenue	1945	Clifton Parker	Muir Mathieson
The Seventh Veil	1945	Benjamin Frankel	Muir Mathieson
Stricken Peninsula	1945	Ralph Vaughan Williams	Muir Mathieson
Burma Victory	1945	Alan Rawsthorne	Muir Mathieson
Instruments of the Orchestra (Note: Britten's Young Person's Guide to the Orchestra was composed for this film)	1946	Benjamin Britten	Malcolm Sargent
The Rake's Progress	1946	William Alwyn	Muir Mathieson
A Musical Masquerade	1946	Horace Shepherd	
I'll Turn to You	1946	?	Harry Bidgood
I See a Dark Stranger	1946	William Alwyn	Muir Mathieson
Green for Danger	1946	William Alwyn	Muir Mathieson
Daybreak	1946	Benjamin Frankel	Muir Mathieson
A Song of Thanksgiving	1946	William Alwyn	Muir Mathieson
The Overlanders	1947	John Ireland	Muir Mathieson
Hungry Hill	1947	John Greenwood	Muir Mathieson
Odd Man Out	1947	William Alwyn	Muir Mathieson
Avalanche Patrol	1947	Malcolm Arnold, Muir Mathieson	John Hollingsworth
Black Narcissus	1947	Brian Easdale	Brian Easdale
Take My Life	1947	William Alwyn	Muir Mathieson
The Brothers	1947	Cedric Thorpe Davie	Muir Mathieson
The Upturned Glass	1947	Bernard Stevens	Muir Mathieson
They Made me a Fugitive	1947	M-F Gaillard	John Hollingsworth
The Master of Bankdam	1947	Arthur Benjamin	Muir Mathieson
The October Man	1947	Willam Alwyn	Muir Mathieson
Uncle Silas	1947	Alan Rawsthorne	Muir Mathieson
Down to the Sea	1948	Guy Warrack	Guy Warrack
Easy Money	1948	Temple Abady	Muir Mathieson
Good Time Girl	1948	Lambert Williamson	John Hollingsworth
It's Hard to be Good	1948	Anthony Hopkins	Muir Mathieson
The Mark of Cain	1948	Bernard Stevens	Muir Mathieson
Miranda	1948	Temple Abady	Muir Mathieson
Mr. Perrin and Mr. Traill	1948	Allan Gray	John Hollingsworth
My Brother's Keeper	1948	Clifton Parker	John Hollingsworth
One Night With You	1948	Lambert Williamson	John Hollingsworth
Portrait from Life	1948	Benjamin Frankel	Muir Mathieson
Sleeping Car to Trieste	1948	Benjamin Frankel	Muir Mathieson
Snowbound	1948	Cedric Thorpe Davie	Muir Mathieson
This Modern Age (Women in Our Time)	1948	Malcolm Arnold, Clifton Parker	John Hollingsworth
University of Flying	1948	Francis Chagrin	John Hollingsworth
The Weaker Sex	1948	Arthur Wilkinson	Muir Mathieson
A Boy, a Girl and a Bike	1949	Kenneth Pakeman	John Hollingsworth
Alice in Wonderland	1949	Sol Kaplan	Ernest Irving
Bad Lord Byron	1949	Cedric Thorpe Davie	Muir Mathieson
Blue Lagoon	1949	Clifton Parker	Muir Mathieson
Boys in Brown	1949	Doreen Carwithen	John Hollingsworth
Cardboard Cavalier	1949	Lambert Williamson	Muir Mathieson
Dear Mr. Prohack	1949	Temple Abady	Muir Mathieson
Floodtide	1949	Robert Irving	Robert Irving
Give Us This Day	1949	Benjamin Frankel	Benjamin Frankel
Helter Skelter	1949	Francis Chagrin	Muir Mathieson
It's Not Cricket	1949	Arthur Wilkinson	John Hollingsworth
The Lost People	1949	John Greenwood	Muir Mathieson
Madness of the Heart	1949	Allan Gray	Muir Mathieson
Once Upon a Dream	1949	Arthur Wilkinson	John Hollingsworth
The Spider and the Fly	1949	Georges Auric	Muir Mathieson
Stop Press Girl	1949	Walter Goehr	Walter Goehr
The Astonished Heart	1950	Noël Coward	Muir Mathieson
They Were Not Divided	1950	Lambert Williamson	Muir Mathieson
The Wooden Horse	1950	Clifton Parker	Muir Mathieson
Giselle	1952	Adolphe Adam	Sir Malcolm Sargent
The Story of Gilbert and Sullivan	1953	Arthur Sullivan	Sir Malcolm Sargent
Nigerian Pattern	1954	?	John Hollingsworth
The Night My Number Came Up	1955	Malcolm Arnold	Dock Mathieson
The Man Who Knew Too Much	1955	Bernard Herrmann	Bernard Herrmann
Out of the Clouds	1955	Richard Addinsell	Dock Mathieson
The Cockleshell Heroes	1955	John Addison	Muir Mathieson
1984	1956	Malcolm Arnold	Louis Levy
The Bridge on the River Kwai	1957	Malcolm Arnold	Malcolm Arnold
The 3 Worlds of Gulliver	1960	Bernard Herrmann	Bernard Herrmann
Mysterious Island	1961	Bernard Herrmann	Bernard Herrmann
Cleopatra	1963	Alex North	Alex North
Rio Conchos	1964	Jerry Goldsmith	Jerry Goldsmith
Doctor Zhivago	1965	Maurice Jarre	Maurice Jarre
The Sound of Music	1965	Richard Rodgers, Irwin Kostal	Irwin Kostal
Oliver!	1968	Lionel Bart	Johnny Green
Song of Norway	1969	Edvard Grieg	Øivin Fjeldstad
Crescendo	1969	Malcolm Williamson	Philip Martell
The Music Lovers	1970	Pyotr Ilyich Tchaikovsky	André Previn
Fiddler on the Roof	1971	Jerry Bock	John Williams
The Great American Cowboy	1973	Harold Farberman	Harold Farberman
Rollerball	1975	André Previn	André Previn
Star Wars	1977	John Williams	John Williams
The Fury	1978	John Williams	John Williams
Michel's Mixed-Up Musical Bird	1978	Michel Legrand	Michel Legrand
F.I.S.T.	1978	Bill Conti	Bill Conti
Quintet	1978	Tom Pierson	Tom Pierson
Superman	1978	John Williams	John Williams
Dracula	1979	John Williams	John Williams
The Brontë Sisters	1979	Philippe Sarde	Carlo Savina
Tess	1979	Philippe Sarde	Carlo Savina
The Empire Strikes Back	1980	John Williams	John Williams
Omar Mukhtar, Lion of the Desert	1980	Maurice Jarre	Maurice Jarre
Clash of the Titans	1981	Laurence Rosenthal	Laurence Rosenthal
Les Ailes de la Colombe	1981	Philippe Sarde	Peter Knight
Raiders of the Lost Ark	1981	John Williams	John Williams
Le Choix des Armes	1981	Philippe Sarde	Peter Knight
Birgitt Haas Must Be Killed	1981	Philippe Sarde	Peter Knight
Hôtel des Amériques	1981	Philippe Sarde	Peter Knight
El Pueblo del Sol	1982	Lee Holdridge	Lee Holdridge
Monsignor	1982	John Williams	John Williams
The Last Unicorn	1982	Jimmy Webb	William McCauley
The Dark Crystal	1982	Trevor Jones	Marcus Dods
A Royal Romance	1982	Richard Rodney Bennett	Richard Rodney Bennett
Twice Upon a Time	1983	Dawn Atkinson, Ken Melville	Dawn Atkinson
Brainstorm	1983	James Horner	James Horner
Krull	1983	James Horner	James Horner
Return of the Jedi	1983	John Williams	John Williams
L'Été Meurtrier	1983	Georges Delerue	Georges Delerue
Savage Islands	1983	Trevor Jones	Marcus Dods
Lovesick	1983	Philippe Sarde	Peter Knight
Digital Dreams	1983	Mike Batt, Bill Wyman	Mike Batt
Never Say Never Again	1983	Michel Legrand	Michel Legrand
Garcon!	1983	Philippe Sarde	Peter Knight
The Dresser	1983	James Horner	James Horner
Fort Saganne	1984	Philippe Sarde	Carlo Savina
La Pirate	1984	Philippe Sarde	Carlo Savina
Grand Canyon: The Hidden Secrets	1984	Bill Conti	Bill Conti
The Masks of Death	1984	Malcolm Williamson	Philip Martell
Lifeforce	1985	Henry Mancini	Henry Mancini
Return to Oz	1985	David Shire	David Shire
The Dirty Dozen, the Next Mission	1985	Richard Harvey	Richard Harvey
Wild Geese II	1985	Roy Budd	Roy Budd
Flesh and Blood	1985	Basil Poledouris	Basil Poledouris
Plenty	1985	Bruce Smeaton	Bruce Smeaton
Eleni	1985	Bruce Smeaton	Bruce Smeaton
F/X	1985	Bill Conti	Bill Conti
Aliens	1986	James Horner	James Horner
An American Tail	1986	James Horner	James Horner
Nutcracker	1986	Pyotr Ilyich Tchaikovsky	Sir Charles Mackerras
Dancers	1987	Adolphe Adam	Michael Tilson Thomas
A Summer Story	1987	Georges Delerue	Georges Delerue
Willow	1988	James Horner	James Horner
Who Framed Roger Rabbit	1988	Alan Silvestri	Alan Silvestri
The Land Before Time	1988	James Horner	James Horner
L'Ours	1988	Philippe Sarde	Carlo Savina
Slipstream	1989	Elmer Bernstein	Elmer Bernstein
Honey, I Shrunk the Kids	1989	James Horner	James Horner
Rarg	1989	Philip Appleby	James Stobart
Little Nemo: Adventures in Slumberland	1989	Thomas Chase, Steve Rucker	Thomas Chase, Steve Rucker
All Dogs Go to Heaven	1989	Ralph Burns	Ralph Burns
L'Autrichienne	1989	Didier Vasseur	David Snell
Suivez Cette Avion	1989	Didier Vasseur	David Snell
Lord of the Flies	1989	Philippe Sarde	Harry Rabinowitz
The Nutcracker Prince	1990	Victor Davies	Boris Brott
Eve of Destruction	1990	Philippe Sarde	Harry Rabinowitz
The Josephine Baker Story	1990	Georges Delerue	Georges Delerue
Jesuit Joe	1990	Philippe Sarde	Harry Rabinowitz
Pour Sacha	1990	Philippe Sarde	Harry Rabinowitz
An American Tail: Fievel Goes West	1991	James Horner	James Horner
Rambling Rose	1991	Elmer Bernstein	Elmer Bernstein
The Thief and the Cobbler	1992	Robert Folk	Robert Folk
Water Traveller	1993	Joe Hisaishi	Nick Ingman
Once Upon a Forest	1993	James Horner	James Horner
Shadowlands	1993	George Fenton	George Fenton
The Man Without a Face	1993	James Horner	James Horner
We're Back! A Dinosaur's Story	1993	James Horner	James Horner
Viva la Blanca Paloma	1993	Manolo Sanlucar	Manolo Sanlucar
Le Petit Garcon	1993	Philippe Sarde	Harry Rabinowitz
Schindler's List	1993	John Williams	John Williams
Legends of the Fall	1994	James Horner	James Horner
Immortal Beloved	1994	Ludwig van Beethoven	Sir Georg Solti
The Pagemaster	1994	James Horner	James Horner
Mary of Nazareth	1994	Olivier Lliboutry	David Firman
Street Fighter	1994	Graeme Revell	Tim Simonec
Little Women	1994	Thomas Newman	Thomas Newman
Last of the Dogmen	1994	David Arnold	Nicholas Dodd
Braveheart	1995	James Horner	James Horner
Balto	1995	James Horner	James Horner
Cutthroat Island	1995	John Debney	David Snell
Mary Reilly	1995	George Fenton	George Fenton
Flipper	1996	Joel McNeely	Joel McNeely
Le Jaguar	1996	Vladimir Cosma	Vladimir Cosma
Roseanna's Grave	1996	Trevor Jones	Nick Ingham
Le Plus Beau Métier du monde	1996	Vladimir Cosma	Vladimir Cosma
Meet Wally Sparks	1997	Michel Colombier	David Snell
Soleil	1997	Vladimir Cosma	Vladimir Cosma
Le Bossu	1997	Philippe Sarde	David Snell
The Mighty	1997	Trevor Jones	Geoff Alexander
Asterix and Obelix versus Caesar	1998	Jean-Jacques Goldman, Roland Romanelli	David Snell
Notting Hill	1999	Trevor Jones	Geoff Alexander
Le Schpountz	1999	Vladimir Cosma	Vladimir Cosma
Star Wars: Episode I – The Phantom Menace	1999	John Williams	John Williams
Le Fils de Français	1999	Vladimir Cosma	Vladimir Cosma
Bored Silly	2000	Larry Pecorella	Arnie Roth
I Dreamed of Africa	2000	Maurice Jarre	Maurice Jarre
The Luzhin Defence	2000	Alexandre Desplat	Alexandre Desplat
The Long Run	2000	Trevor Jones	Geoff Alexander
The Body	2000	Serge Colbert	David Snell
Thirteen Days	2000	Trevor Jones	Geoff Alexander
Left Behind: The Movie	2000	James Covell	James Covell
The Death of Klinghoffer	2001	John Adams	John Adams
The Sedra Tree	2001	Mark Stevens	Mark Stevens
Final Fantasy: The Spirits Within	2001	Elliot Goldenthal	Dirk Brossé
Phoenix Blue	2001	Stewart Parsons	Chris Austin
Asterix and Obelix: Mission Cleopatra	2001	Philippe Chany	David Snell
Crossroads	2001	Trevor Jones	Geoff Alexander
Star Wars: Episode II – Attack of the Clones	2002	John Williams	John Williams
Dreams Without Sleep	2002	Mark Stevens	Mark Stevens
Conspiracy of Silence	2002	David Butterworth	David Butterworth
Harry Potter and the Chamber of Secrets	2002	John Williams	William Ross
I'll Be There	2002	Trevor Jones	Geoff Alexander
Inquietudes	2003	Alexandre Desplat	Alexandre Desplat
Tomb Raider: The Angel of Darkness (video game)	2003	Peter Connelly, Martin Iveson	David Snell
League of Extraordinary Gentlemen	2003	Trevor Jones	Geoff Alexander
Around the World in 80 Days	2004	Trevor Jones	Geoff Alexander
Upside of Anger	2004	Alexandre Desplat	Alexandre Desplat
Birth	2004	Alexandre Desplat	Alexandre Desplat
Harry Potter and the Goblet of Fire	2005	Patrick Doyle	James Shearman
Wah-Wah	2005	Patrick Doyle	James Shearman
Star Wars: Episode III – Revenge of the Sith	2005	John Williams	John Williams
Hostage	2005	Alexandre Desplat	Alexandre Desplat
Halim	2006	Ammar El Sherei	Nick Ingman
A Throw of Dice	2006	Nitin Sawhney	Nitin Sawhney
The Queen	2006	Alexandre Desplat	Alexandre Desplat
Superman II: The Richard Donner Cut (music reused from the first film)	2006	John Williams	John Williams
Eragon	2006	Patrick Doyle	James Shearman
Sleuth	2007	Patrick Doyle	James Shearman
The Last Legion	2007	Patrick Doyle	James Shearman
Copying Beethoven	2007	Antoni Lazarkiewicz	Benjamin Wallfisch
The Golden Compass	2007	Alexandre Desplat	Alexandre Desplat
Largo Winch	2008	Alexandre Desplat	Alexandre Desplat
The Mummy: Tomb of the Dragon Emperor	2008	Randy Edelman	Randy Edelman
Coco Before Chanel	2009	Alexandre Desplat	Alexandre Desplat
Chéri	2009	Alexandre Desplat	Alexandre Desplat
The Twilight Saga: New Moon	2009	Alexandre Desplat	Alexandre Desplat
Iron Cross	2009	Roger Bellon	
Tamara Drewe	2010	Alexandre Desplat	Alexandre Desplat
The Special Relationship	2010	Alexandre Desplat	Alexandre Desplat
Harry Potter and the Deathly Hallows – Part 1	2010	Alexandre Desplat	Alexandre Desplat
The King's Speech (source music)	2011	L. van Beethoven & W.A. Mozart	Terry Davies
A Better Life	2011	Alexandre Desplat	Alexandre Desplat
Thor	2011	Patrick Doyle	James Shearman
Harry Potter and the Deathly Hallows – Part 2	2011	Alexandre Desplat	Alexandre Desplat
The Ides of March	2011	Alexandre Desplat	Alexandre Desplat
The Lodger: A Story of the London Fog	2012	Nitin Sawhney	Nitin Sawhney
Kinect Star Wars (video game)	2012	Gordy Haab; Kyle Newmaster	Allan Wilson
Rise of the Guardians	2012	Alexandre Desplat	Alexandre Desplat
Zero Dark Thirty	2012	Alexandre Desplat	Alexandre Desplat
Brave	2012	Patrick Doyle	James Shearman
The Three Musketeers	2013	Alexey Shelygin	Nick Ingman
The Imitation Game	2014	Alexandre Desplat	Alexandre Desplat
Cinderella	2015	Patrick Doyle	James Shearman
Star Wars Battlefront (video game)	2015	Gordy Haab	Andy Brown
Trollhunters: Tales of Arcadia (TV series; Hero and Dark themes only)	2016	Alexandre Desplat	Alexandre Desplat
Sonic Forces (video game)	2017	Tomoya Ohtani	Lee Reynolds
The Shape of Water	2017	Alexandre Desplat	Alexandre Desplat
Star Wars Battlefront II (video game)	2017	Gordy Haab	Andy Brown
Asterix: The Secret of the Magic Potion	2018	Philippe Rombi	Philippe Rombi
Avengers: Endgame	2019	Alan Silvestri	Alan Silvestri, Mark Graham
Star Wars Jedi: Fallen Order (video game)	2019	Stephen Barton; Gordy Haab	Gavin Greenaway; Andy Brown
Hello Beautiful	2024	Marco Werba	Marco Werba
Wicked	2024	John Powell, Stephen Schwartz	Gavin Greenaway
Mickey 17	2025	Jung Jae-il	James Brett
Wicked: For Good	2025	John Powell; Stephen Schwartz	Gavin Greenaway
