= Folk Songs of the Four Seasons =

Cantata by Ralph Vaughan Williams

- Cantata by Ralph Vaughan Williams
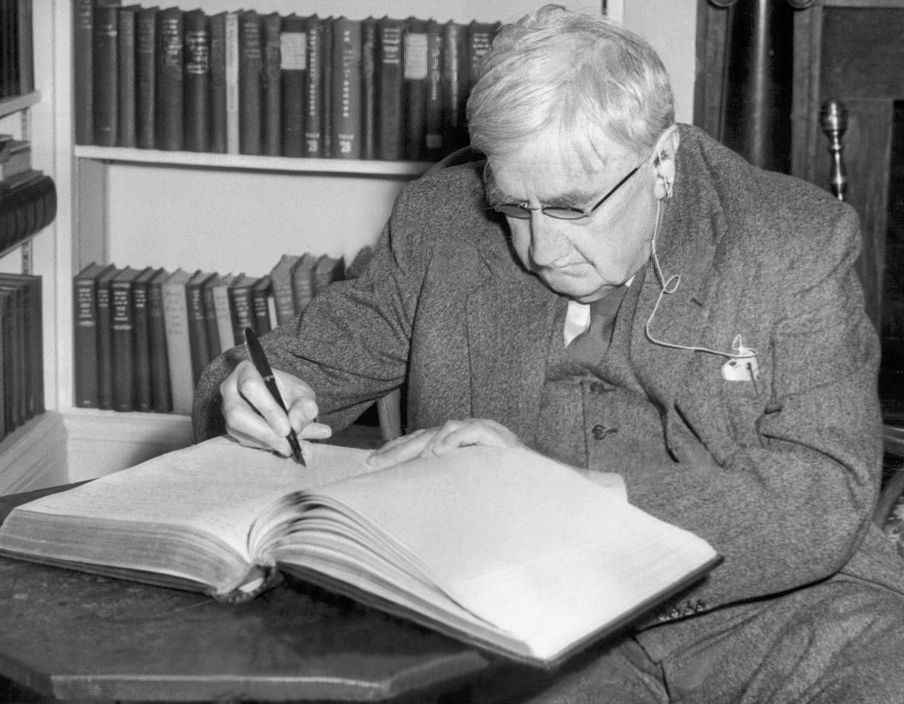
- The composer in 1954
- Occasion: The Women's Institute Singing Festival
- Text: English folksongs
- Language: English
- Composed: 1949
- Performed: 15 June 1950
- Scoring: women's choir; orchestra

Folk Songs of the Four Seasons is a cantata for women's voices with orchestra or piano by English composer Ralph Vaughan Williams written in 1949. Based on English folk songs, some of which he had collected himself in the early 20th century, the work was commissioned by the Women's Institute for a Singing Festival held at the Royal Albert Hall on 15 June 1950. The first performance featured a choir of 3,000 women, accompanied by the London Symphony Orchestra conducted by Sir Adrian Boult. Ursula Vaughan Williams remembered that owing to the huge choir "the audience seemed far fewer than the performers".

The work is in four movements grouped into the seasons, with a prologue:

- Prologue: To the Ploughboy
- Spring: Early in the Spring, The Lark in the Morning, May Song
- Summer: Summer is a-coming in and The Cuckoo, The Sprig of Thyme, The Sheep Shearing, The Green Meadow
- Autumn: John Barleycorn, The Unquiet Grave, An Acre of Land
- Winter: Children's Christmas Song, Wassail Song, In Bethlehem City, God Bless the Master

The work is one of Vaughan Williams' lesser-known choral works, and received its first recording in 2009 under Sir David Willcocks conducting the Choir of Clare College, Cambridge, English Voices, and the Dmitri Ensemble.

A fully orchestral version was arranged by Vaughan Williams' musical assistant and amanuensis Roy Douglas in 1952. Vaughan Williams considered the orchestral suite to be so much the work of Roy Douglas, that he arranged for it to be published as Douglas's composition based on his own, rather than his own arrangement of an earlier work. The orchestral version was first recorded in 2012.
