= Dashing Away with the Smoothing Iron =

English folk song

"Dashing Away with the Smoothing Iron" is an English folk song about a man admiring the woman he loves as she goes through daily stages of washing and ironing clothes. It is classified as Roud number 869. The earliest date in the Vaughan Williams catalogue is 1904, as collected in Somerset and arranged by Cecil Sharp. A later entry for 1908 gives the source as Jane Gulliford from Somerset. The Fresno State University gives a slightly different title, "Driving Away at the Smoothing Iron", with a date of 1909.

== Lyrics ==
'Twas on a [ Monday | Tuesday | Wednesday | Thursday | Friday | Saturday | Sunday ] morning
When I beheld my darling:
She looked so neat and charming
In every high degree;
She looked so neat and nimble, O,
[ A-washing | A-hanging | A-starching | A-ironing | A-folding | A-airing | A-wearing ] of her linen, O,

Refrain
Dashing away with the smoothing iron,
Dashing away with the smoothing iron,
She stole my heart away.

== Adaptations ==
The song was set as the fourth movement of his Suite for Strings by John Rutter in (1973) under the title Dashing Away. Later he arranged the song for choral performance as the fifth piece in his Five traditional songs (1978).

== See also ==
- "Monday's Child", a traditional English rhyme mentioning the days of the week
- "Solomon Grundy", an English nursery rhyme mentioning the days of the week
