= Wings of the Morning (1937 film) =

- Directed by: Harold D. Schuster; Glenn Tyron (original director)
- Written by: Tom Geraghty (narration); Gilbert Wakefield (scenario)
- Screenplay by: Thomas J. Geraghty; John Meehan
- Story by: Brian Oswald Donn-Byrne
- Based on: Destiny Bay; 1928 two short stories by Donn Byrne
- Produced by: Robert Kane
- Starring: Annabella; Henry Fonda; Leslie Banks
- Cinematography: Ray Rennahan
- Edited by: James B. Clark
- Music by: Arthur Benjamin; Muir Mathieson
- Production company: New World Pictures
- Distributed by: 20th Century Fox
- Release dates: 19 February 1937 (UK); 11 March 1937 (US)
- Running time: 89 minutes
- Country: United Kingdom
- Language: English
- Budget: $850,000 or £150,000

Wings of the Morning is a 1937 British drama film directed by Harold D. Schuster and starring Annabella, Henry Fonda, and Leslie Banks. Glenn Tryon was the original director but he was fired and replaced by Schuster. It was the first ever three-strip Technicolor movie shot in England or Europe. Jack Cardiff is credited as the camera operator. Filming started in June 1936 and concluded in August.

Popular Irish tenor Count John McCormack appeared in the film singing "Believe Me, If All Those Endearing Young Charms" and "Killarney". The picture was French actress Annabella's first English language film. Henry Fonda met his second wife, Frances Ford Seymour, mother of Jane and Peter Fonda, on the set at Denham.

== Plot ==
In 1889, there is a tempestuous love of an Irish nobleman for the fiery Romany Gypsy princess Maria. The couple marries against social conventions in both communities but he dies shortly afterward in a riding accident. Maria leaves the estate and goes to Spain with the Gypsy caravan. 50 years later, Maria returns to Ireland with her great-granddaughter.

== Cast ==
- Annabella as Young Marie/Maria, Duchess of Leyva
- Henry Fonda as Kerry Gilfallen
- Leslie Banks as Lord Clontarf
- Stewart Rome as Sir Valentine
- Irene Vanbrugh as Old Marie
- Harry Tate as Paddy
- Helen Haye as Aunt Jenepher
- Edward Underdown as Don Diego (as Teddy Underdown)
- Mark Daly as James Patrick Aloysius 'Jimmy' Brannigan
- Sam Livesey as Angelo
- E. V. H. Emmett as Racing Commentator
- R.C. Lyle as Racing Commentator (as Captain R.C. Lyle)
- John McCormack as himself - the Tenor
- Steve Donoghue as himself
- Evelyn Ankers as a party guest (uncredited)
- Hermione Darnborough as a gypsy dancer
