= Symphony No. 6 (Vaughan Williams) =

1947 symphony by Vaughan Williams

Opening of symphony

Ralph Vaughan Williams composed his Sixth Symphony (published, unnumbered, as his Symphony in E minor) between 1944 and 1947. It is a purely orchestral work, with the conventional four movements, but the orchestration adds a saxophone to the customary woodwind instruments. Many listeners, including some prominent music critics, felt that the work had a hidden programme, possibly connected with desolation after a nuclear war, but the composer maintained that it was to be regarded as absolute music.

The symphony was first performed on 21 April 1948 and within two years it had received a hundred performances, including the American, Australian, French, German and Italian premieres. The first recordings were made ten months after the first performance and the symphony has received numerous recordings subsequently.

== Background and premiere ==
Vaughan Williams's previous symphony, the Fifth, first heard in 1943, is a largely serene work, taken by many to be a valediction by the septuagenarian composer, but during 1944 he began to contemplate a new symphony. The inspiration for the work is not known. The conductor Malcolm Sargent, who toured the work internationally in the years immediately after the premiere, believed the composition had been prompted by the death of the bandleader Ken "Snakehips" Johnson and many others when the Café de Paris was bombed in the London Blitz. The composer's widow and biographer, Ursula Vaughan Williams, wrote, "rightly or wrongly, he never allowed the idea that lay behind the last movement of this symphony to be known to the critics who speculated on its historical and philosophical origin".

The first performance of the Sixth Symphony was given by Sir Adrian Boult and the BBC Symphony Orchestra at a Royal Philharmonic Society concert in the Royal Albert Hall on 21 April 1948, broadcast live on the BBC Home Service. (Note: Despite the composer's practice of not giving his symphonies numbers, the BBC billed the new work in Radio Times as "Symphony No 6 in E minor", and the composer himself referred in a letter to "my no. 6".) The work was an immediate success. In the words of the musical scholar Michael Kennedy, "The Sixth Symphony caused a sensation and was performed over 100 times in two years. Nothing like that had occurred in English music since Elgar's First Symphony in 1908".

Serge Koussevitzky and the Boston Symphony Orchestra gave the American premiere in August 1948; Bernard Heinze conducted the first performance in Australia in October 1948. In January 1949 Boult conducted the Italian premiere, with the Orchestra dell'Accademia Nazionale di Santa Cecilia, and Leopold Stokowski introduced the work to New York. Hans Schmidt-Isserstedt conducted the German premiere the following month. Boult conducted the Orchestre national de la RTF in the French premiere in Paris in January 1950.

== Conjectured programme ==
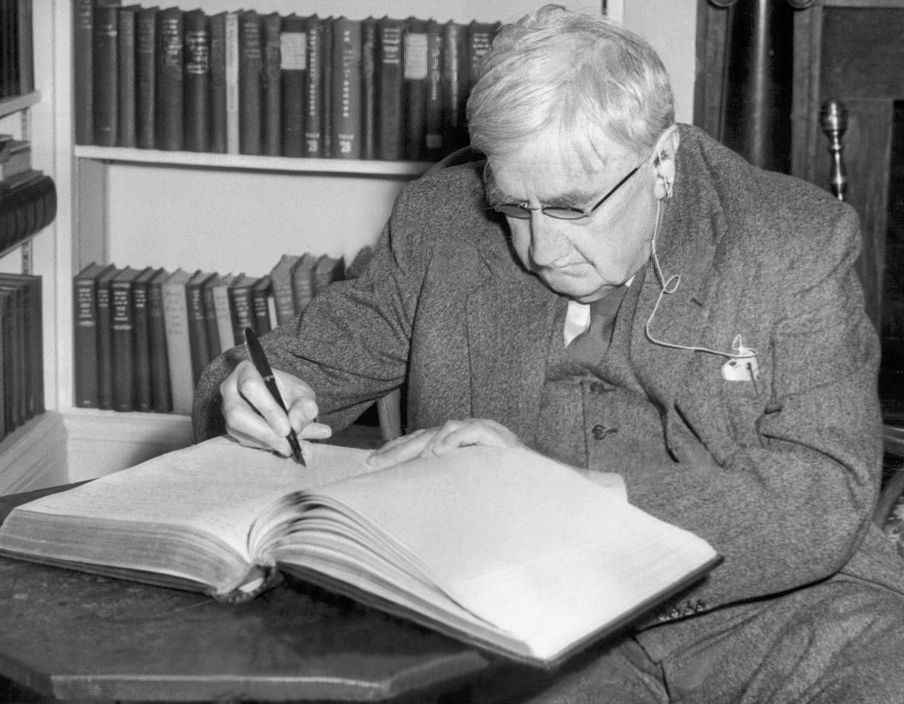
Vaughan Williams in 1954

After a notice in The Times called the Sixth "The war symphony", Vaughan Williams wrote to Frank Howes, the paper's chief music critic, "I dislike that implied connection very much". To his musical assistant Roy Douglas he complained, "It never seems to occur to people that a man might just want to write a piece of music". Nevertheless, there were those who thought the violent and jazzy scherzo was inspired by the bombing of the Café de Paris or that the pianissimo epilogue depicted a world laid waste by atomic warfare. Ursula Vaughan Williams wrote:

Ralph's programme notes for the symphony were, he said, severely practical, a map for the listener to use rather than a series of picture postcards. He was passionately anxious to discourage the critics from inventing "meanings". He would have liked to print Mendelssohn's saying that "the meaning of music is too precise for words" on every concert programme at which his works were played.

Vaughan Williams later hinted at a possible vague inner programme for the symphony in a letter written in January 1956 to Kennedy: "With regard to the last movement of my No. 6, I do NOT BELIEVE IN meanings and mottoes, as you know, but I think we can get in words nearest to the substance of my last movement in 'We are such stuff as dreams are made on, and our little life is rounded with a sleep'". (Note: From Act IV of Shakespeare's The Tempest) Kennedy later wrote that although the composer's own programme note is objectively analytical and "it is possible to hear the work as an investigation of tonic and dominant relationships and of counterpointing basic types of rhythms", nonetheless, "one cannot escape the impression that some kind of extra-musical drama or struggle is being described".

== Reception ==
The press reaction was extremely positive. The Times commented on "The music's vigour and power, coming from a man of seventy-five", but it was the mysterious finale that attracted most attention. Richard Capell, in The Daily Telegraph, described the premiere as "a profoundly memorable event", and said that the composer, "true to the spirit of his whole career", had done the unpredictable thing:

While something of an enigma is present, the listener feels that the music springs from a torturing pain, notably the indescribably poignant slow movement. But there is no passive submission. The sardonic scherzo is one of the composer's most active and crowded movements. This leads to a finale like nothing else in music – a wholly pianissimo movement like a long farewell.

After the American premiere, Olin Downes wrote in The New York Times

[T]his is one of the most powerful and deeply felt symphonic writings to have appeared since the turn of the century. The sincerity of the expression blazes in every page. The virility and driving energy of it are companioned by pages of tenderness and mysticism. Had this music only reflected the realizations and mellow understandings of an introspective spirit and an artist now in his seventy-sixth year, it would have been more than enough. But we have here a score of astonishing strength and of the most passionate emotion. It is drama, inner drama, wrought from suffering and realization, and compassion, and experience. And it is great music.

Stokowski wrote in the programme note for the first New York performance:

The more I study Vaughan Williams' Symphony in E minor, the more I have the impression that this is music that will take its place with the greatest creations of the masters. [ … ] in this Symphony the world of music has a true picture of today, expressing the turmoil, the dark despair, the aspiration of an ideal future. Every listener will find his own meaning in the unique finale of this Symphony – one of the most profound expressions in all music.

The critic and musical scholar Deryck Cooke wrote that the effect on him of the premiere was "nothing short of cataclysmic":

the violence of the opening and the turmoil of the whole first moment; the sinister mutterings of the slow movement, with that almost unbearable passage in which the trumpets and drums batter out an ominous rhythm, louder and louder, and will not leave off; the vociferous uproar of the Scherzo and the grotesque triviality of the Trio; and most of all, the slow finale, pianissimo throughout, devoid of all warmth and life, a hopeless wandering through a dead world ending literally in … nothingness.

Cooke added that the symphony, as a work of art, more than deserved the overwhelming applause it got, but he wrote "I was no more able to applaud than at the end of Tchaikovsky's Pathétique Symphony – less so, in fact, for this seemed to be an ultimate nihilism beyond Tchaikovsky's conceiving: every drop of blood seemed frozen in one's veins".

== Music ==
A typical performance takes about 35 minutes. The work is scored for a large orchestra including: 2 flutes, piccolo (doubling 3rd flute), 2 oboes, cor anglais, 2 clarinets in B♭, tenor saxophone (doubling bass clarinet in B♭), 2 bassoons, contrabassoon, 4 horns in F, 3 trumpets in B♭, 3 trombones, tuba, timpani, side drum, triangle, bass drum, cymbals, xylophone, harp (optionally doubled), and strings.

The symphony is dedicated to the composer's musical assistant Michael Mullinar. It is in four linked movements (i.e. one movement leads straight into the next, with no pause between them), and includes a number of ideas that return in various guises throughout the symphony, for example the use of simultaneous chords a half-step apart, or the short-short-long rhythmic figure.

The four movements are:

1. Allegro
2. Moderato
3. Scherzo: Allegro vivace
4. Epilogue: Moderato

=== I. Allegro ===
The symphony begins very loudly with the full orchestra playing simultaneously in a clash of F minor and E minor. Structurally, the movement falls loosely into the category of sonata form with its carefully organised contrasting themes and key centres. A striking point of contrast is the reappearance near the end of the movement of one of the main themes in a clear and rich E major. The first movement ends with a sustained unison E in the low instruments, at which point the second movement begins.

=== II. Moderato ===
The second movement starts a tritone away, in B♭ minor. The main themes are so chromatic that they eventually have little sense of profile. A central feature of this movement is a "rat-a-tat" rhythmic motive that recurs through most of the movement, beginning in the second measure. At one point, that figure goes away for a while, and the effect of its eventual return is an almost palpable sense of dread.

After an enormous battering climax fuelled by that figure (including the single loudest point in the entire symphony), the movement winds down with a lengthy solo played by the cor anglais, still accompanied by the same three-note ostinato. The sustained last note links via a half-step drop to the next movement.

=== III. Scherzo: Allegro vivace ===
This movement, heavily fugal in texture, follows a typical scherzo/trio structure, but the overall feel is hardly one of amusement; the high spirits are decidedly raucous and sardonic. Although the rhythmic style is less disjointed than in the first movement (the listener has little trouble following the meter here), the harmony (heavily dominated by tritones, or lowered fifths) and orchestration both revert to the first movement's density.

The trio section features the tenor saxophone's only true solo role in the symphony; in his programme note, the composer wrote of this theme: "Constant Lambert tells us that the only thing to do with a folk tune is to play it soft and repeat it loud. This is not a folk tune but the same difficulty seems to crop up".

When the scherzo material recurs the composer inverts the fugue subject and eventually combines that form with the original version. With the final climax (the trio theme stated by full orchestra) the music almost collapses, leaving the bass clarinet holding the sustained note that links to the Finale.

=== IV. Epilogue: Moderato ===
This movement follows a vaguely fugal structure; the entire movement is marked pp, meaning played very softly (with the repeated instruction senza crescendo, no increase in the volume). Vaughan Williams himself, in his programme note, speaks of "drifting" and "whiffs of theme" in characterising the music.

== Recordings ==
The first two recordings were initially released on 78 rpm discs. The first was made on 21 February 1949 by the Philharmonic-Symphony Orchestra of New York under Stokowski who had been a fellow organ student of Vaughan Williams at the Royal College of Music in the 1890s. The second was by Boult days later with the London Symphony Orchestra. Both used the original version of the third movement. The composer revised that movement in 1950; Boult immediately recorded it for His Master's Voice (HMV) and that new version was included in the subsequent LP releases. Boult made a new recording of the symphony in late 1953 for Decca in the presence of the composer, who thanked the musicians at the end of those sessions; this speech was taped and included on disc releases as an appendix to the symphony.

Orchestra	Conductor	Location and date
New York Philharmonic-Symphony Orchestra	Leopold Stokowski	Manhattan Center, 21 February 1949
London Symphony Orchestra	Sir Adrian Boult	Abbey Road Studios, 23 24 February 1949
London Philharmonic Orchestra	Sir Adrian Boult	Kingsway Hall, 28 31 December 1953
BBC Symphony Orchestra	Sir Malcolm Sargent	Royal Albert Hall, 4 August 1964
Boston Symphony Orchestra	Sir John Barbirolli	Symphony Hall, Boston, 30 October 1964
Utah Symphony Orchestra	Maurice Abravanel	University of Utah Music Hall, December 1965
New Philharmonia Orchestra	Sir Adrian Boult	Abbey Road, 27 February and 1 March 1967
London Symphony Orchestra	André Previn	Kingsway Hall, 1–3 April 1968
Bavarian Radio Symphony Orchestra	Sir John Barbirolli	Herkulessaal, Munich, 10 April 1970
New Philharmonia Orchestra	Sir Adrian Boult	Cheltenham Town Hall, 7 July 1972
BBC Symphony Orchestra	Sir Adrian Boult	Royal Albert Hall, 16 August 1972
Bournemouth Symphony Orchestra	Paavo Berglund	Kingsway Hall, 17–18 June 1974
London Philharmonic Orchestra	Vernon Handley	Walthamstow Assembly Hall, 5 6 February 1979
Bavarian Radio Symphony Orchestra	Sir Colin Davis	Gasteig, Munich, 30 April and 1 May 1987
USSR State Symphony Orchestra	Gennadi Rozhdestvensky	Philharmonia Building, Leningrad, 31 October 1988
London Symphony Orchestra	Bryden Thomson	St Jude-on-the-Hill, Hampstead, 16–17 December 1988
Philharmonia Orchestra	Leonard Slatkin	Watford Town Hall, 6–8 April 1990
Academy of St Martin in the Fields	Sir Neville Marriner	Henry Wood Hall, London, May 1990
BBC Symphony Orchestra	Andrew Davis	St Augustine's, Kilburn, October 1990
Bournemouth Symphony Orchestra	Kees Bakels	Winter Gardens, Bournemouth, 12 November 1993
Royal Liverpool Philharmonic	Vernon Handley	Philharmonic Hall, Liverpool, 5–6 March 1994
London Philharmonic Orchestra	Bernard Haitink	Colosseum, Watford, 13–14 December 1997
London Philharmonic Orchestra	Roger Norrington	Colosseum, Watford, 15–16 December 1997
London Symphony Orchestra	Richard Hickox	All Saints Church, Tooting, 21–22 January 2003
Hallé Orchestra	Sir Mark Elder	Bridgewater Hall, Manchester, 10 November 2016
Royal Liverpool Philharmonic Orchestra	Andrew Manze	Philharmonic Hall, Liverpool, 21–23 April 2017
London Symphony Orchestra	Sir Antonio Pappano	Barbican Hall, 15 March 2020
BBC Philharmonic	John Wilson	Media City, Salford, 14 January 2020
BBC Symphony Orchestra	Martyn Brabbins	Colosseum, Watford, 21–22 September 2021

== Notes, references and sources ==
=== Sources ===
- Adams, Byron (1989). "The Stages of Revision of Vaughan Williams's Sixth Symphony". The Musical Quarterly. 73 (3): 382–400. (subscription required)
- Cooke, Deryck (1959). The Language of Music. London: Oxford University Press. OCLC 906957.
- Heffer, Simon (2001). Vaughan Williams. London: Phoenix. ISBN 9780753811245.
- Kennedy, Michael (1980). The Works of Ralph Vaughan Williams (second ed.). London and New York: Oxford University Press. ISBN 978-0-19-315453-7.
- Kennedy, Michael (1996). A Catalogue of the Works of Ralph Vaughan Williams. Oxford and New York: Oxford University Press. ISBN 0198165846.
- Schwartz, Elliott (1964). The Symphonies of Ralph Vaughan Williams. Amherst: University of Massachusetts Press. ISBN 0-87-023004-2.
- Simeone, Nigel (2022). Ralph Vaughan Williams and Adrian Boult. Woodbridge: Boydell Press. ISBN 9781800106376.
- Vaughan Williams, Ralph (1948). Symphony in E minor. Oxford: Oxford University Press. OCLC 504077465.
- Vaughan Williams, Ursula (1965) [1964]. RVW: A Biography of Ralph Vaughan Williams. Oxford: Oxford University Press. ISBN 978-0-19-315411-7.
