= William Nelson Darnborough =

American gambler

William Nelson Darnborough (1869–1958) was an American gambler from Bloomington, Illinois, who was known for his success in roulette at Monte Carlo from 1904 to 1911. During that time period he amassed a fortune of $415,000.($11,374,844) in 2020 In one of the more legendary feats, Darnborough bet on the number 5 and won on five successive spins.

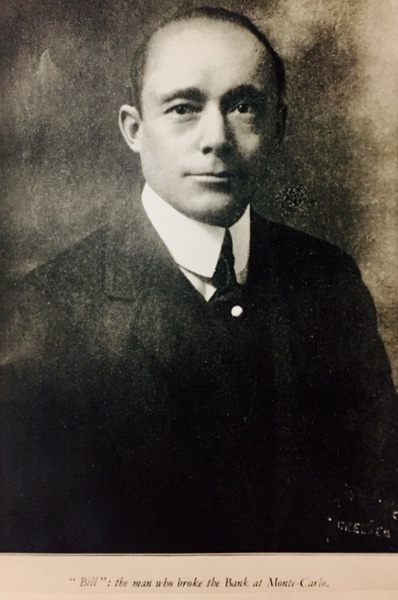
Bill: "The man who broke the bank at Monte Carlo".

After his wins, Darnborough married a young woman of noble blood, and lived on an estate in England. His son was the film producer Antony Darnborough (1913–2000) and his daughter, the ballerina Hermione Darnborough (1915–2010), married the distinguished composer and director of film music, Muir Mathieson. His granddaughter Fiona Mathieson (1951–1987) played Clarrie Grundy in the BBC radio serial The Archers. His grandson James Darnborough (born 1969) is a real estate agent and artist based in London and Los Angeles.
