= Dock Mathieson =

Scottish composer and conductor (1914–1985)

- Born: John Davie Mathieson; 20 May 1914; Stirling, Scotland
- Died: 3 December 1985 (aged 71); Charlbury, Oxfordshire

John Davie ("Dock") Mathieson (20 May 1914 – 3 December 1985) was a Scottish musician. In between his early and late careers as a teacher, he was a musical director for British films in the 1940s and 1950s. He was instrumental in securing Ralph Vaughan Williams's score for the 1948 film Scott of the Antarctic, which the composer later reworked as the Sinfonia antartica. Other films on which Mathieson worked included The Lavender Hill Mob (1951), The Titfield Thunderbolt (1953) and The Ladykillers (1955).

== Life and career ==
Dock Mathieson was born in Stirling, Scotland, on 20 May 1914, the younger of the two sons of John George Mathieson (1880–1955), an artist and engraver, and his wife Jessie née Davie (1884–1954), a violinist, pianist and teacher. His childhood mispronunciation of "Jock" – Scottish for his name, "John" – stuck throughout his life. The Mathiesons' elder son, Muir, became a conductor and musical director in British films, as his brother also did. Jessie ("Jen") Mathieson was a talented musician, who among other engagements foreshadowed her sons' careers by playing the piano accompaniment for silent films at the local cinema. As a teenager Mathieson played in a youth orchestra in Stirling, established and conducted by his brother.

Mathieson trained as a music teacher at the Scottish National Academy of Music, supplemented by violin lessons with Otakar Ševčík in Edinburgh, before winning a scholarship to the Royal College of Music in London. After leaving the college in 1935, he joined the London Symphony Orchestra as leader of the viola section. He later became assistant music master at Sedbergh School and music master at West Buckland School in Devon. His career was interrupted by service in the army from 1941 to 1946, stationed in India. On returning after the war, he joined the film industry as assistant musical director under Ernest Irving at Ealing Studios. In 1948 Mathieson, together with Michael Balcon, persuaded Ralph Vaughan Williams to write the score for Balcon's epic film Scott of the Antarctic. The composer later reworked the score into his seventh symphony, the Sinfonia antartica. Some of Mathieson's early work was with the director Charles Crichton on Ealing comedies such as The Lavender Hill Mob (1951).

After Irving retired in May 1953, Mathieson succeeded him as musical director. He was in charge of the music for The Titfield Thunderbolt (1953), and Alexander Mackendrick's The Maggie (1954). He was later musical director for Out of the Clouds (1955) and Mackendrick’s The Ladykillers (1955), with a score by Tristram Cary.

Like his elder brother, Mathieson was enthusiastic about encouraging young people, and after Ealing Studios closed in 1959 he returned to teaching. For a few years he taught music in Hertfordshire, and having maintained his skills as a string player he supplemented his income by playing in orchestras and at film music sessions.

Mathieson died on 3 December 1985, aged 71, at his home in Charlbury, Oxfordshire. His funeral service was held on 6 December 1985 at Oxford Crematorium.

== Sources ==
- Hetherington, S. J. (2006). Muir Mathieson: A Life in Film Music. Dalkeith: Scottish Cultural Press. ISBN 978-1-89-821811-1.
- McFarlane, Brian, ed. (2005). The Encyclopedia of British Film (second ed.). London: Methuen. ISBN 978-0-413-77526-9.
