= Loophole (1954 film) =

1954 film by Harold D. Schuster

- Theatrical release poster
- Directed by: Harold D. Schuster
- Screenplay by: Warren Douglas
- Story by: Dwight V. Babcock; George Bricker
- Produced by: Lindsley Parsons
- Starring: Barry Sullivan; Dorothy Malone; Charles McGraw
- Cinematography: William A. Sickner
- Edited by: Ace Herman
- Music by: Paul Dunlap
- Production company: Allied Artists Pictures
- Distributed by: Allied Artists Pictures
- Release date: March 28, 1954
- Running time: 80 minutes
- Country: United States
- Language: English

Loophole is a 1954 American film noir crime drama starring Barry Sullivan and Dorothy Malone. The film was directed by former editor Harold D. Schuster. Mary Beth Hughes plays the film's femme fatale. It was shot in black-and-white and produced by Allied Artists Pictures, a company that generally specialized in B-movies.

== Plot ==
In Los Angeles, Herman Tate, a teller, infiltrates a group of examiners at a bank in the Hollywood precinct. As the examiners audit the earnings, Tate, with the help of his accomplice Vera, steals $50,000 from teller Mike Donovan's cash drawer. When the bank closes for the day, Donovan discovers the shortage, though he does not immediately report it and leaves for the weekend. Donovan tells his wife Ruthie about the incident, who encourages him to tell Jim Starling, the bank manager.

The next Monday, Donovan tells Starling, who contacts the bank's bonding company. Gus Slavin, an insurance investigator and former cop, is sent over to the bank branch to interrogate Donovan. Slavin immediately suspects Donovan of the robbery and has him booked for suspicion of grand theft. Donovan and Ruthie are taken to police headquarters, where they are interrogated by FBI agent Neil Sanford, who establishes the couple were in debt as a possible motive. The police search the house, but find nothing incriminating.

While Donovan takes a polygraph test, he remembers the bank examiner's appearance and voice and that his cash drawer was checked twice, which is not standard procedure. Donovan passes the polygraph, but Sanford is unconvinced. After Donovan's coworker Georgia Hoard is questioned, a bank guard confirms he saw a bank teller, which matches Donovan's description. The bank examiners are called in, but Donovan recognizes none of them as the one he saw. Released from custody, Donovan is tailed by Slavin and returns to work, where Starling fires Donovan as the bonding company has canceled his bond.

After some time, Donovan loses the few jobs that he is able to obtain due to Slavin's intimidation. At the police headquarters, Slavin bets he will recover the money and obtain Donovan's confession in six months. Low in savings, Donovan and Ruthie are forced to sell their home and move into an apartment. Hired as a taxi cab driver, Donovan recognizes Tate's voice when he and Vera enter his taxi, but they leave after recognizing Donovan.

At their apartment, Slavin asks Donovan to return the money, and then keep $10,000 for himself. Donovan however refuses, and provokes Slavin by asserting he will keep it all. One day, after Ruthie has her bankbook checked, Donovan recognizes Tate as the teller who committed the robbery. He pursues Tate until he corners him in an alley. Tate proposes they split the money fifty-fifty.

Donovan is taken to Vera's apartment and given half of the money. However, Vera holds Donovan at gunpoint. Slavin arrives at the apartment door, and desperate to escape, Tate slugs Donovan and escapes with Vera. Regardless, Slavin doesn't believe Donovan's story and holds him until Donovan's new boss Pete Tanner arrives and assaults Slavin, allowing Donovan to chase the real culprits. Donovan calls Sanford to inform the Malibu police. He follows the culprits to a Malibu beach house, where Vera shoots Donovan in the shoulder but he quickly subdues them. The police arrive and arrest Tate and Vera. After the money is successfully recovered, Donovan is reinstated at the bank and made the assistant manager.

== Cast ==
- Barry Sullivan as Mike Donovan
- Dorothy Malone as Ruthie Donovan
- Charles McGraw as Gus Slavin
- Don Haggerty as Neil Sanford
- Mary Beth Hughes as Vera
- Don Beddoe as Herman Tate
- Dayton Lummis as Jim Starling
- Joanne Jordan as Georgia Hoard
- John Eldredge as Frank Temple
- Richard Reeves as Pete Mazurki / Tanner

== Reception ==
=== Film noir analysis ===
Film critic Dennis Schwartz explains why Loophole is considered a film noir: "The poignancy of the story is in how an innocent, hard-working person like Mike, could have his whole life turned upside-down over an incident where he makes an error in judgment. When he tells his boss (Lummis) about it, he has no explanation why he didn't report it immediately except he couldn't understand how so much money was missing. This slip-up is why Mike becomes a noir protagonist, though he doesn't have the dark side to his character this genre usually calls for...[and] his life turns into hell when, even though he is not charged with anything, the bonding company that must insure him cancels his certification and the bank is forced to fire him. Not only can't he get bonded so he can get another teller's job, but the bond company puts a mean-spirited insurance investigator on his tail, Gus Slavin (Charles McGraw). Slavin is convinced Mike is guilty and tails him everywhere, and when Mike gets a job he informs the boss on him and Mike is always promptly fired."

Eddie Muller of the Film Noir Foundation made this analysis: "Made at the tail end of the McCarthy era, Loophole replaced fear of criminals with fear of authority run amok. McGraw exemplified the scary establishment torpedo, whether it's an insurance investigator, a Commie-hunting Fed, or a self-righteous cop. There was no distinction between 'law-abiding' McGraw and the ruthless torpedo he played in T-Men: Either way, he's cruel for the hell of it, relishing the license he's granted to torture citizens, guilty or not."
