= Solomon Grundy (nursery rhyme) =

English nursery rhyme

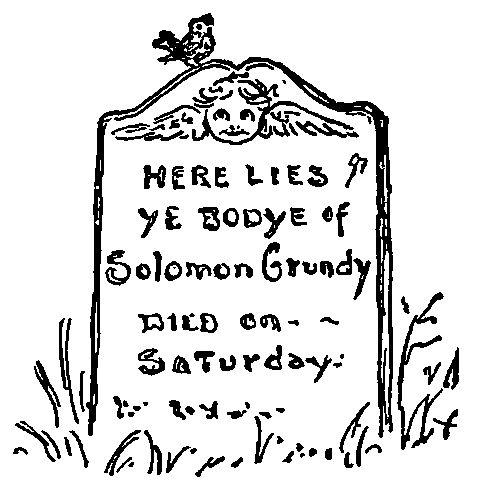
"Here lies ye bodye of Solomon Grundy. Died on Saturday..." An illustration from Clara E. Atwood's 1901 A Book of Nursery Rhymes

"Solomon Grundy" is an English nursery rhyme. It has a Roud Folk Song Index number of 19299.

== Lyrics ==
The rhyme has varied very little since it was first collected by James Orchard Halliwell and published in 1842 with the lyrics:

Solomon Grundy,
Born on a Monday,
Christened on Tuesday,
Married on Wednesday,
Took ill on Thursday,
Worse on Friday,
Died on Saturday,
Buried on Sunday.
This is the end
Of Solomon Grundy.

The words of a French version of the rhyme were adapted by the Dada poet Philippe Soupault in 1921 and published as an account of his own life:

PHILIPPE SOUPAULT dans son lit / né un lundi / baptisé un mardi / marié un mercredi / malade un jeudi / agonisant un vendredi / mort un samedi / enterré un dimanche / c'est la vie de Philippe Soupault

== See also ==
- "Dashing Away with the Smoothing Iron", an English folk song mentioning the days of the week
- "Monday's Child", an English rhyme mentioning the days of the week
- Solomon Grundy, a DC Comics character of the same name
