= Joan Lawson =

English ballet dancer and writer

Fair use by Richard Slaughter

Joan Lawson (30 January 1907 – 18 February 2002) was an English ballet dancer and writer of several books and text on the subject of dance. She performed in revues and opera with the Nemtchinova-Dolin Ballet from approximately 1933 to 1934 and was director of the Royal Academy of Dance's teacher's course between 1947 and 1959 and was the Royal Ballet Society's character and mime teacher from 1963 to 1971. Lawson was a critic for the Dancing Times and was vice-chair of the Imperial Society of Teachers of Dancing.

== Biography ==
Lawson was born in London, England, on 30 January 1907. She was the daughter of Robb and Edrith Marion Lawson, née Usherwood. Lawson went to Moscow State Academy of Choreography, and then attended Vaganova Academy of Russian Ballet before completing her education at the Seraphina Astafieva School of Dance. She had studied under Serafina Astafieva and Margaret Morris, and briefly performed in revues and opera with the Nemtchinova-Dolin Ballet from approximately 1933 to 1934. Lawson then decided to focus her attention on writing and teaching and was on the Advisory Council for Education for the armed services as a lecturer during the Second World War from 1940 and until 1947. She was the director of the teacher's course at the Royal Academy of Dance between 1947 and 1959 and was the Royal Ballet Society's character and mime teacher from 1963 to 1971. Lawson co-founded the Imperial Society of Teachers of Dancing's National Dance Branch (now called National Dance) to focus on studying folk dance in-depth in 1952.

From 1940 to 1954, she was a critic for Dancing Times and was the author of multiple books and text on dance. Lawson published Ballet in the U.S.S.R. in 1945; "Job," and "The Rake's Progress" in 1949; co-translated with Stephen Garry Valerian Mikhailovich Bogdanov-Berezovsky's Ulanova and the Development of the Soviet Ballet in 1952; European Folk Dance: Its National and Musical Characteristics in 1953; Mime: The Theory and Practice of Expressive Gesture, With a Description of Its Historical Development in 1957; Dressing for the Ballet with Peter Revitt in 1958; Classical Ballet: Its Style and Technique in 1960; A History of Ballet and its Makers in 1964; edited and translated Tamara Stepanovna Tkachenko's Soviet Dances in 1964 and Tkachenko's More Soviet Dances in 1967; A Third Set of Soviet Dances in 1968; The Teaching of Classical Ballet: Common Faults in Young Dancers and Their Training in 1973 and Teaching Young Dancers: Muscular Coordination in Classical Ballet in 1975.

She also authored The Story of Ballet in 1976; Beginning Ballet: A Concentrated Primer for Ballet Students of All Ages in 1977; Ballet Stories in 1978; The Principles of Classical Dance and The Kay Ambrose Ballet Companion each in 1979; Ballet Class: Principals and Practice in 1984; A Ballet-Maker's Handbook: Sources, Vocabulary, Styles in 1991; and edited Sophia Golovkina's Lessons in Classical Dance in the same year. Lawson contributed to Enciclopedia Della Spectaccolo, Encyclopædia Britannica, Oxford Junior Encyclopedia and several dance journals. She was a member of the Critics' Circle, the Imperial Society of Teachers of Dancing of which she served as vice-chairperson, the International Folk Music Society and the Society for Theatre Research. Lawson received the Imperial Award "for special services to national dance." She died on 18 February 2002.

== Legacy ==
The Royal Ballet School Special Collections' Arnold Haskell Dance Library hold a collection of records of Lawson's professional and writing career as well as dance and theatre ephemera. They include her correspondence, illustrations, manuscripts, notes, photographs, publications and programmes.
