= Serafina Astafieva =

Russian dancer (1867–1934)

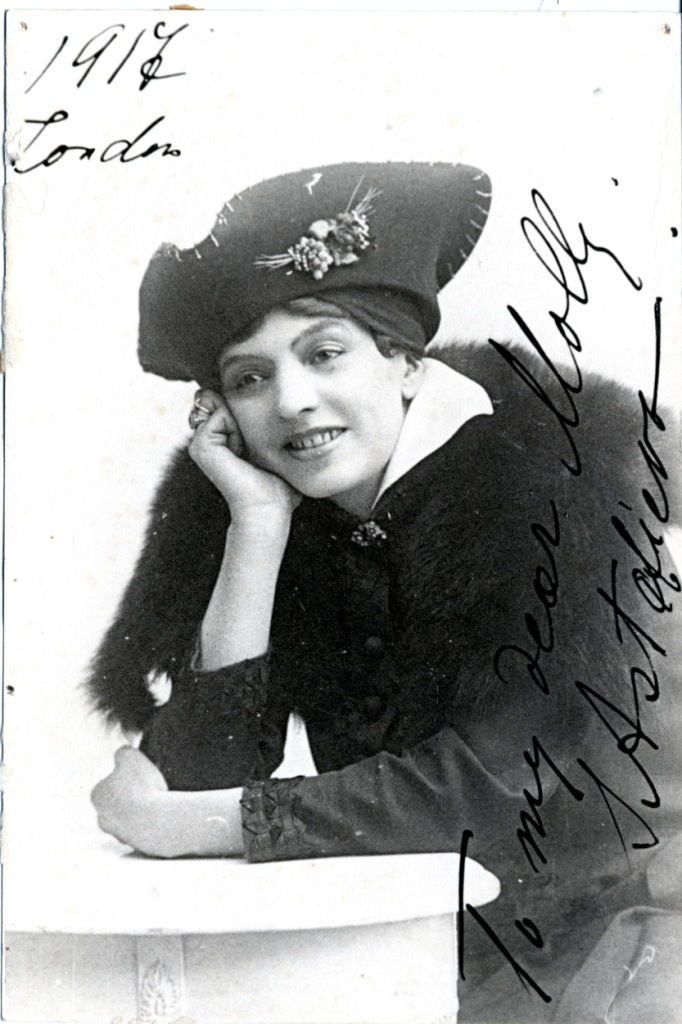
- Born: Серафима Александровна Астафьева; 1876; St. Petersburg, Russia
- Died: 13 September 1934 (aged 57–58); London, England
- Education: Imperial Ballet School
- Occupations: Ballet dancer, ballet teacher
- Employer: Ballets Russes

Serafina Astafieva (Russian: Серафима Александровна Астафьева; 1876 – 13 September 1934) was a Russian dancer and ballet teacher.

== Early life and education ==
Serafina Astafieva was born in Saint Petersburg in 1876, part of the family of noble Alexander Astafyev. She was a grand-niece of the author Leo Tolstoy. Some sources suggest that he advised sending the young Serafina to a ballet school to recover from illness. She was a pupil at the Ballet Department of St Petersburg's Imperial Theatre School, graduating into the corps de ballet in 1895.

== Career ==
Considered only a "mediocre" dancer, she remained in the corps de ballet most of her career, finally being promoted to coryphee in 1903, two years before leaving the company.

In 1914, The Tatler reported that she had worked as a nurse for eight months during the 1904-1905 Russo-Japanese War.

From 1911-1913 Astafieva performed with Sergei Diaghilev's Ballets Russes. Her key principal roles were Cleopatra and Schehezarada in the ballet company's first visit to Covent Garden. She also danced a principal role in The Blue God.

== Teaching ==
After retiring from performing she turned to teaching ballet and opened the Russian Dancing Academy at The Pheasantry on King's Road in Chelsea, London. Her pupils included Anton Dolin, Margot Fonteyn, Alicia Markova, Hermione Darnborough, Madeleine Vyner, and Joan Lawson. It was at her studio that Diaghilev first saw Alicia Markova dance.

== Personal life ==
In 1896, she married the famous character dancer Jozef Kschessinsky, brother of the prima ballerina Mathilde Kschessinskaya. In 1898 she had a son, Vyacheslav. The couple divorced after a few years.

She retired from performing in 1914 on marriage to a Mr. Konstantin Graves, who had held a role at the Imperial Russian Court under Grand Duchess Marie, but the marriage was not successful and they separated soon after.

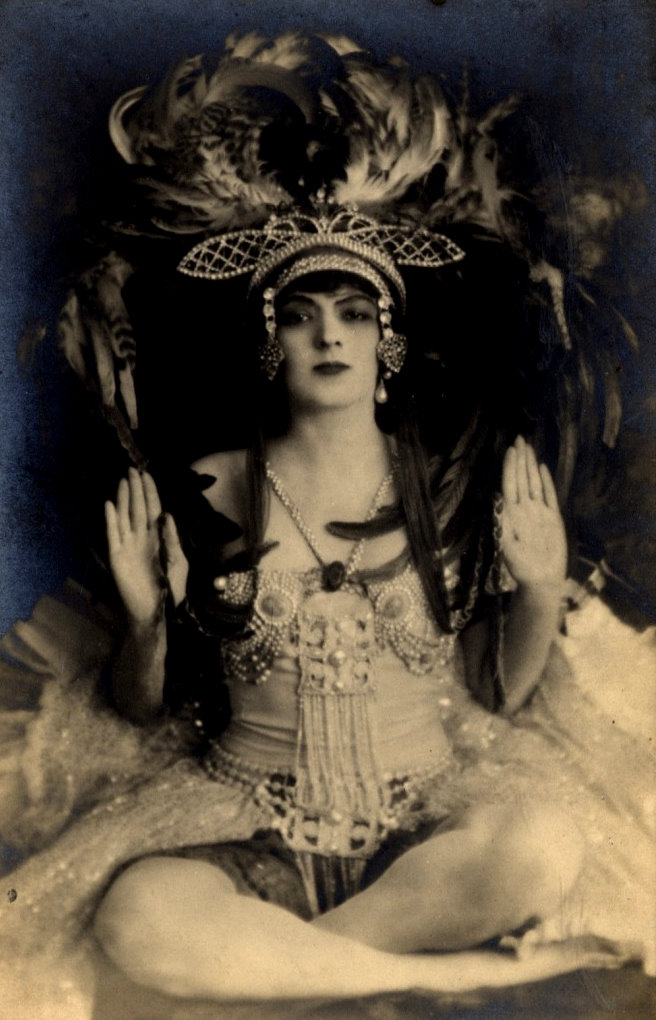
Serafina Astafieva, c. 1890s

== Commemoration ==
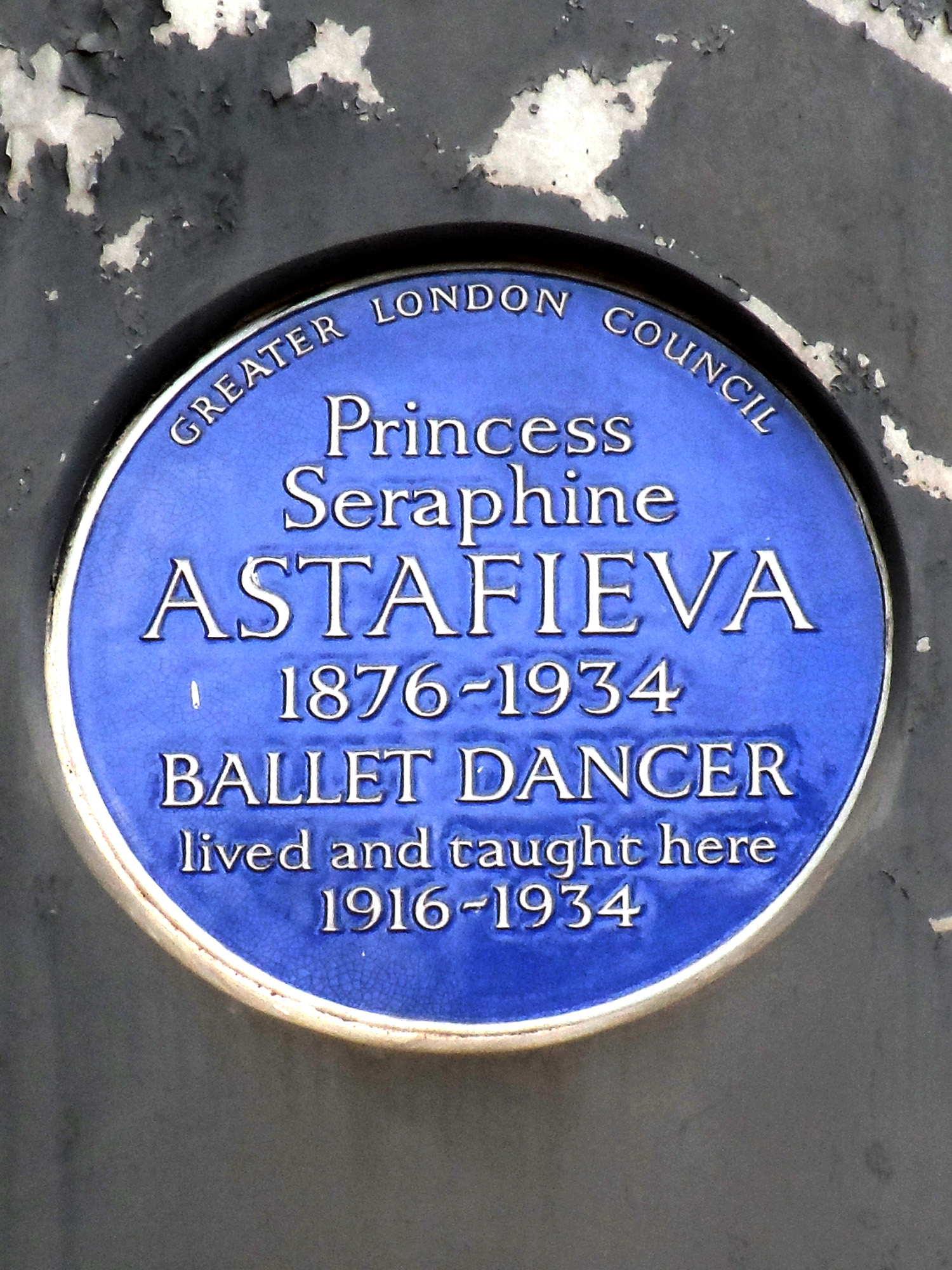
Princess Seraphine ASTAFIEVA 1876-1934 BALLET DANCER lived and taught here 1916-1936

Sculptor Emmy Haskell created a bust of Astafieva in c. 1927 which is now held in the V&A Museum.

A blue plaque was unveiled in Astafieva's memory in 1968 at 152 King's Road in Chelsea.

She is referenced as "Grishkin" in T. S. Eliot's poem Whispers of Immortality.

== See also ==
- List of Russian ballet dancers
