= Hermione Darnborough =

British ballet dancer

Hermione Maria Louise Darnborough (1915 – 29 October 2010), later Hermione Mathieson, was an English principal ballerina who made her name at Sadler's Wells in the 1930s. She retired at a young age after marrying the conductor and composer Muir Mathieson.

== Background ==
Hermione Darnborough came from a wealthy and well-connected family in Weybridge, Surrey. On the side of her "glamorous and determined" mother, Frances, she was a cousin of the Duke of Argyll and the Duke of Portland. Her American father, Bill (or Billy) Darnborough (1869–1958), a former minor league baseball player and chop house owner who amassed a small fortune at roulette in the early years of the twentieth century, has been described as "the man who broke the bank at Monte Carlo, though ... [l]ike many an habitual gambler, he would generally lose his winnings at the next turn of the wheel, and it took all his wife's pleading to persuade him to stop". Her brother was the film producer Antony Darnborough (1913–2000), whose sister-in-law, journalist Drusilla Beyfus (1927-2026), married theatre critic Milton Shulman and was mother of Alexandra Shulman, editor of British Vogue from 1992 to 2017, and Nicola Shulman, later Marchioness of Normanby.

== Career landmarks ==
=== Early promise ===
In 1929, at the age of 14, Darnborough auditioned for the Russian impresario Serge Diaghilev during the final season that the highly influential Ballets Russes performed in London. He was evidently impressed and asked to see her again in three years time, but nothing came of this as he died a few weeks later in Venice.

From an early age, Darnborough took part in a range of productions, including charity matinées and Christmas pantomimes. Among the latter were Beauty and the Beast (1928) and Puss in Boots (1929) at the Lyceum Theatre, London. Darnborough's teacher was Miss Euphan MacLaren, whose stage school in Kensington was often called upon when young people were required for films. In 1930, she appeared in On with the Dance!, a short film for Pathé's cinemagazine for women, Eve's Film Review, as one of six MacLaren girls dancing in floaty gowns while holding large balls and balloons. At one point, Darnborough performs pirouettes and dances towards the camera as the others look on. A caption enquires, "And what wouldn’t we give to be as light-hearted and light-footed as this pretty toe dancer!" This film can still be viewed online.

The following year Darnborough won the senior cup in the All England Solo Competition at the New Scala Theatre, London. Reporting on the event for the Dancing Times, which featured an early photograph of Darnborough, Arnold L Haskell wrote that she was "above the average, with the makings of a first class soloist", while noting that "competition conditions seem to affect the senior artists far more than the children" and that consequently there was in all of them "a certain strain and lack of spontaneity".

Darnborough took additional lessons from some leading Russian teachers in London, notably Serge Morosov and Serafina Astafieva, and, with MacLaren's encouragement, joined the class of Ninette de Valois who, in 1931, founded the Vic-Wells company (forerunner of the Royal Ballet). Darnborough recalled that, when she first danced for her, the composer Constant Lambert, who was musical director of Vic-Wells, was "watching amiably" and that de Valois was impressed by the height of her jump.

=== Vic-Wells ===
In 1932 Darnborough joined the Vic-Wells company, where she remained for three seasons. Her early appearances included roles in Swan Lake, The Birthday of Oberon (as Summer) and The Snow Maiden (as, among other things, a lily, a swan and a tree). In 1933 she performed in Les Rendezvous, Frederick Ashton's first major production at Sadler's Wells Theatre, London, dancing a pas de six with Beatrice Appleyard, Sheila McCarthy, Freda Bamford, Nadina Newhouse and Gwyneth Mathews. Others who appeared in this landmark production included Alicia Markova, Robert Helpmann ("so pushy, but very funny with it" according to Darnbrough) and de Valois herself ("good technique, but stiff arms").

In 1934 Darnborough played a leading role in Les Sylphides with Helpmann, Appleyard and Ursula Moreton and, in her final season the following year, was Queen of the Wilis in Giselle, a role for which she was coached by Anton Dolin. With Margot Fonteyn making her first appearance at Sadler's Wells, as a snowflake in The Nutcracker, in 1934, Darnborough was part of the company during a period of major development in British ballet and one in which, as the poet and novelist Robert Graves put it, "ballet extended its popularity from highbrows downwards".

=== Wings of the Morning (1937) ===
In 1937 Darnbrough appeared as a gypsy dancer in Harold Schuster's Wings of the Morning, the first British film to be shot in technicolor and one of the few British colour pictures to survive from the 1930s. Film historian Leslie Halliwell described Wings of the Morning, whose cast included Leslie Banks and Henry Fonda (who met his second wife, American socialite Frances Seymour Brokaw, mother of Jane and Peter Fonda, on the set at Denham studios), as "great to look at and quite charming, though slight".

== Photographic model ==
As a young dancer, Darnborough was known for her pretty looks and elegant poise. One critic at the time described her as "tall, lithe and graceful ... as if she might play Peter Pan without wires". In 1934, while still in her teens, she posed nude for the German-born photographer E.O. Hoppé, whose previous subjects had included Lillian Gish, Bernard Shaw and Benito Mussolini. Hoppé was particularly interested in stage performers as subjects and regarded by contemporaries as a connoisseur of female beauty. In 2011 his portrait of Darnborough (together with less revealing photographs of Beatrice Appleyard and a 16-year-old Margot Fonteyn) formed part of an exhibition of his work at the National Portrait Gallery in London and was featured in the Sunday Times.

== Hiawatha, marriage and family ==
During the 1930s ballet to some extent replaced grand opera as "the great cultural event of London's summer season". Darnborough took part in the annual summer productions of Samuel Coleridge-Taylor's Hiawatha at the Royal Albert Hall, which were choreographed by Euphan MacLaren, among others, and had a cast of some 800 singers and 200 dancers. Well into the 21st century, a child veteran of Saturday performances recalled the "amazing" proportions of the scenery - a huge backdrop of mountains and trees, with wigwams and "the sound of a waterfall" - and the "horrible brown liquid" used for make-up. During the 1935 production, in which Darnborough danced the lead, she met Muir Mathieson while he was deputising as conductor for Malcolm Sargent. They were married at the Brompton Oratory on 21 December 1935. Darnborough had seemed set to become a major star, but she effectively retired from dancing after her marriage. She appeared not to have regretted her decision and, in old age, recalled both the relatively poor pay at Vic-Wells and the sternness of de Valois, who would "stamp her stick furiously" and had once castigated her for the untidiness of her dressing table.

The Mathiesons moved into an old farmhouse near Alexander Korda's Denham studios in Buckinghamshire, where Muir Mathieson worked for London Films. They had four children, Muirne, Niall, Shuna and Fiona, the youngest of whom, the actress Fiona Mathieson (1951–87), played Clarrie Grundy in the radio serial The Archers. William Alwyn's Suite of Scottish Dances (1946) was dedicated for the birth of Niall Mathieson. Muir Mathieson, who died on 2 August 1975, directed or composed the music for a very large number of celebrated films, including This Happy Breed (1944), Genevieve (1953) and Vertigo (1958).

== Final years ==
Darnborough celebrated her 90th birthday by watching Darcey Bussell dance at Covent Garden. In 2008 she was visited at her home in Oxfordshire by a South African "blogger" who noted her peaceful life and artistic background and the following year she gave an interview to the Dancing Times, whose retrospective of her career was illustrated with photographs from her own collection. Darnborough died peacefully on 29 October 2010, aged 95.
