= Harold Schuster =

American film director (1902–1986)

Harold D. Schuster
- Born: August 1, 1902; Cherokee, Iowa, U.S.
- Died: July 19, 1986 (aged 83); Westlake Village, California, U.S.
- Occupations: Editor; Film director Actor
- Years active: 1927–1966

Harold D. Schuster (August 1, 1902 – July 19, 1986) was an American editor and film director. In 1937, he made Wings of the Morning, the first-ever three-strip Technicolor film shot in Europe.

Among the better-known films that Schuster directed are the 1954 film noir thriller Loophole and the 1957 Western Dragoon Wells Massacre.

== Selected filmography ==
=== As editor ===
- Women Everywhere (1930)
- Don't Bet on Women (1931)
- Always Goodbye (1931)
- One More Spring (1935)

=== As director ===
- Wings of the Morning (1937)
- Dinner at the Ritz (1937)
- Queer Cargo (1938)
- Swing That Cheer (1938)
- Exposed (1938)
- One Hour to Live (1939)
- Framed (1940)
- Zanzibar (1940)
- Ma! He's Making Eyes at Me (1940)
- South to Karanga (1940)
- Diamond Frontier (1940)
- A Very Young Lady (1941)
- On the Sunny Side (1942)
- Small Town Deb (1942)
- The Postman Didn't Ring (1942)
- Girl Trouble (1942)
- Bomber's Moon (co-director credited as "Charles Fuhr"; 1943)
- My Friend Flicka (1943)
- Marine Raiders (1944)
- The Mad Hatter (1946)
- The Tender Years (1948)
- So Dear to My Heart (1949)
- Kid Monk Baroni (1952)
- Jack Slade (1953)
- Loophole (1954)
- Security Risk (1954)
- Port of Hell (1954)
- The Adventures of Ellery Queen (1955) (TV series)
- Tarzan's Hidden Jungle (1955)
- Finger Man (1955)
- Texas Rose (1956)
- Schlitz Playhouse (1956) (TV series)
- Down Liberty Road (1956)
- Zane Grey Theater (1957) (TV series)
- Dragoon Wells Massacre (1957)
- Portland Exposé (1957)
- Courage of Black Beauty (1958)
- The Adventures of McGraw (1958) (TV series)
- The Power of the Resurrection (1958)
- Tombstone Territory (1958) (TV series)
- Lassie (1959) (TV series)
- The Lineup (TV series)
- Man with a Camera (TV series)
- U.S. Marshal (TV series)
- The D.A.'s Man (TV series)
- Death Valley Days (TV series)
- Overland Trail (TV series)
- Surfside 6 (TV series)
- The Legend of Jesse James (TV series)
