= Early, Early in the Spring =

Song

- British folk song
- Other name: "As I Was Walking Up London Street", etc.
- Catalogue: Roud 152, Laws M1
- Published: 1690 – 1694: Britain
- Publisher: Broadside

"Early, Early in the Spring" (Roud 152, Laws M1) is a British folk song that has been collected from traditional singers in England, Scotland, Ireland, Canada and the United States. It tells the story of a sailor gone to sea whose beloved promises to wait for him. When he returns she has married a rich man and he goes back to sea with a broken heart and a bitter attitude. In a few American versions the betrayed lover is a cowboy.

Other names for this song include As I Was Walking Up London Street, I Was Forced on Board to Serve My King, The Sailor Deceived, Sweet William (or Willie), and The Disappointed Sailor, and cowboy variants are called Cowboy's Girl, Following the Cow Trail and The Trail to Mexico.

== Synopsis ==
A sailor goes on board ship (sometimes pressed) while his sweetheart pledges her undying love.

It was one morning in the spring,
I went on board to serve the king.
I left my dearest dear behind
Which oftentimes told me her heart was mine.

During his voyages he writes to her but hears nothing in return. He thinks of her when in danger during storms and battles. When he returns to England he sometimes finds a letter in the street:

As I was walking up London Street
I found a letter at my feet
And down in the bottom these lines were wrote
A single sailor is soon forgot.

He goes to her father's house, where her father tells him she is married, often to a rich man:

I walked straight out to her father's hall
And for my true love I did call
"Your true love's married, she's a rich man's wife,
She's married to one much better, for life."

He curses false love and greedy fathers:

Curst on all false love where ere it be,
A curse on all such Perjury:
A curse on those who ere do make
Or break a Vow for Riches sake.

A curse on gold and silver too,
A curse upon that Miser, who
Has made his Daughter change her mind,
Oh! womens tongues are like the wind.

and vows to return to face the dangers of naval warfare.

"Yes, I'll go back on board again,
Yes, I'll go back, and serve my king,
Yes, I'll go back where the bullets fly
I'll sail the sea till the day I die."

Sometimes she pleads with him to find another love, claiming her father had withheld the letters:

"O stop young man, O stop" said she
"For there is far handsomer girls that me
There is far handsomer girls that I
So don't go where the bullets fly."!

and:

If you have written to this town
I never have received one'
It is my father's fault you'll find.
O do not blame this poor heart of mine!

Some English versions are very short, having only three or four verses and missing many details of the original ballad plot.

== History ==
=== Early Printed Versions ===
Three broadsides printed between 1690 and 1700, with one dated 1694, titled THE Sea-man's Complaint FOR His Unkind Mistress Of Wapping and two more which include The Young Womans Answer in her own Vindication tell pretty much the same story, and starts:

When I went early in the spring,
On Board a ship to serve the King,
I left my dearest Love behind,
Who said her heart for ere was mine.

There seem to have been no more recent broadsides, though a version titled "The Disappointed Sailor" appeared in "A Pedlar's Pack of Ballads and Songs" published in Edinburgh in 1869.

=== Collecting History ===
The Roud Folk Song Index lists 75 versions of this song collected from traditional singers - 15 from England, 7 from Scotland, 3 from Ireland, 8 from Canada and 42 from the US, plus 3 cowboy variants, all from Arkansas.

=== Early Recordings ===
- Carl T Sprague recorded Following the Cow Trail for RCA Victor in 1926.

=== Field Recordings ===
Available to listen online:

- Hamish Henderson recorded Willie Mathieson at Ellon, Aberdeenshire, singing 'Twas Early Early All in the Spring in 1952.
- Max Hunter recorded Mrs. Pearl Brewer at Pochahantas, Arkansas on November 12, 1958, singing Unfaithful Lover'
- Max Hunter recorded Dessie Harriman at Japton, Arkansas on August 19, 1959, singing Cowboy's Girl
- Max Hunter recorded Chester Box at Fort Smith, Arkansas on July 14, 1967, singing Trail to Mexico

=== Revival Recordings ===
Peggy Seeger, Cyril Tawney, Tina Greer and Bob Davenport have all recorded versions of this song.
