= Sinfonia antartica =

Symphony in five movements by Ralph Vaughan William (1953)

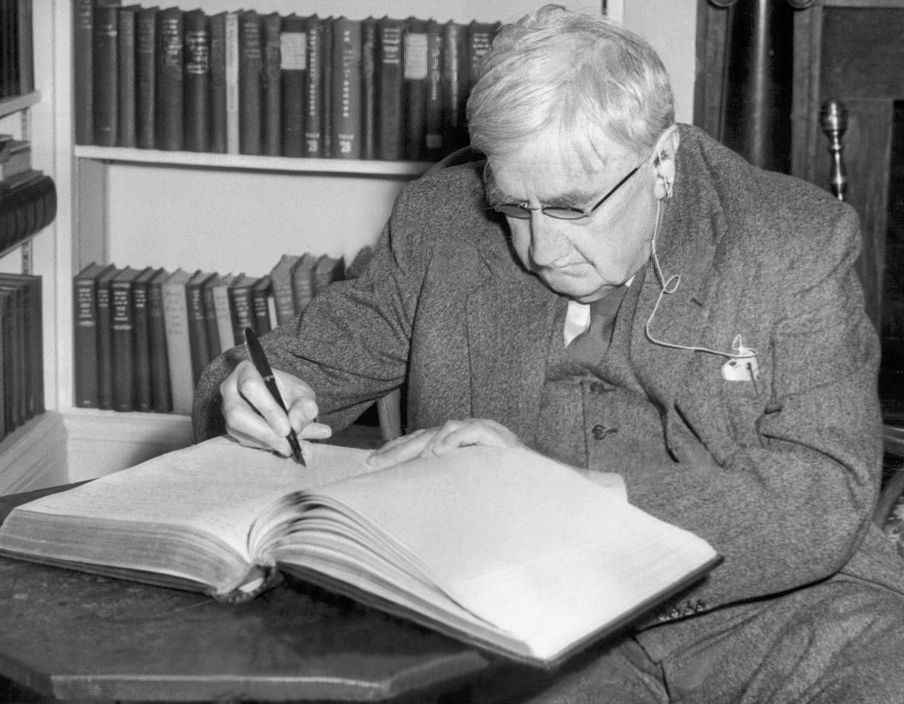
Ralph Vaughan Williams signing the guest book at Yale University in 1954

Sinfonia antartica ("Antarctic Symphony") is the Italian title given by Ralph Vaughan Williams to his seventh symphony, first performed in 1953. It drew on incidental music the composer had written for the 1948 film Scott of the Antarctic.

== Background and first performances ==
By the mid-1940s, Vaughan Williams had written five symphonies of widely varying characters, from the choral Sea Symphony (1909) to the turbulent and discordant Fourth (1934) and the serene Fifth (1943), which some took to be the septuagenarian composer's symphonic swan song. In the event there were four more symphonies to come; his Sixth was premiered in 1948. After completing it, Vaughan Williams undertook a substantial film score to accompany Scott of the Antarctic produced by Michael Balcon and directed by Charles Frend. The composer became deeply interested in and moved by the story of the disastrous polar expedition of Robert Falcon Scott and his companions, and music suggested by ice and wind, penguins and whales came into his head. Before even seeing the film script he had composed most of the score. His biographer Michael Kennedy writes that the autograph full score contains 996 bars of music, of which about half was used in the finished film. (Note: A suite arranged from the complete score premiered in 2002 plays for more than 40 minutes and consists of 18 sections.)

While writing the film music, Vaughan Williams had begun to feel that it might later form the basis of a symphony. He worked on that intermittently during the next few years, between other major compositions including his opera The Pilgrim's Progress. By early 1952 the symphony was complete. His musical assistant Roy Douglas played a piano arrangement to a group of musicians including Arthur Bliss, Gerald Finzi and Edward Dent; also in the group was Ernest Irving, who had commissioned the film score and to whom Vaughan Williams dedicated the new symphony. An orchestral score was sent to Sir John Barbirolli, who had secured the composer's agreement that he should conduct the premiere. The work was first given in public on 14 January 1953 at the Free Trade Hall, Manchester, by Barbirolli and the Hallé Orchestra and Choir with Margaret Ritchie in the wordless soprano solo. The performers repeated the performance at the same venue the following evening, and gave the London premiere at the Royal Festival Hall on 21 January. The title of the symphony was changed at the last minute from Sinfonia Antarctica to Sinfonia Antartica, so as to use consistently Italian spelling in the two words.

The first American performance was given on 2 April 1953 by the Chicago Symphony Orchestra conducted by Rafael Kubelík. The Australian premiere was given by the Sydney Symphony Orchestra conducted by Eugene Goossens on 17 June 1953.

== Score notes ==
The work is scored for a large orchestra including:

- Woodwinds: three flutes (3rd doubling on piccolo), two oboes, cor anglais, two clarinets, bass clarinet, two bassoons, contrabassoon
- Brass: four horns, three trumpets, three trombones, tuba
- Percussion: timpani, side drum, bass drum, cymbals, triangle, gong, bells, xylophone, glockenspiel, vibraphone, wind machine
- Keyboards: celesta, piano, organ (in the third movement)
- Strings: harp, and strings
- Voices: (first and last movements) soprano solo, three-part women's chorus.

== Mechanics of the composition ==
A typical performance lasts around 45 minutes. There are five movements. The composer specified that the third movement lead directly into the fourth. The score includes a brief literary quotation at the start of each movement. While Vaughan Williams did not say that these quotations were intended to form part of a performance of the work, they are sometimes declaimed in performance and in recordings. Among the recordings including the quotations are Sir Adrian Boult's first recording for Decca in 1954 (supervised by the composer) with Sir John Gielgud narrating, and André Previn's 1967 recording for RCA with Sir Ralph Richardson narrating.

1. Prelude: Andante maestoso

To suffer woes which hope thinks infinite,
To forgive wrongs darker than death or night,
To defy power which seems omnipotent,
...
Neither to change, nor falter, nor repent:
This ... is to be
Good, great and joyous, beautiful and free,
This is alone Life, Joy, Empire and Victory.

— quotation from Shelley, Prometheus Unbound

2. Scherzo: Moderato

There go the ships, and there is that Leviathan whom thou hast made to take his pastime therein.

— quotation from Psalm 104, Verse 26

3. Landscape: Lento

Ye ice falls! Ye that from the mountain's brow
Adown enormous ravines slope amain —
Torrents, methinks, that heard a mighty voice,
And stopped at once amid their maddest plunge!
Motionless torrents! Silent cataracts!

— quotation from Coleridge, Hymn before Sunrise, in the vale of Chamouni

4. Intermezzo: Andante sostenuto

Love, all alike, no season knows, nor clime,
Nor hours, days, months, which are the rags of time.

— quotation from Donne, The Sun Rising

5. Epilogue: Alla marcia, moderato (non troppo allegro)

I do not regret this journey; we took risks, we knew we took them, things have come out against us, therefore we have no cause for complaint.

— quotation from Captain Scott's Last Journal

== Recordings ==
| Conductor | Orchestra | Chorus | Soloist | Narrator | Recorded | Ref |
|---|---|---|---|---|---|---|
| Sir John Barbirolli | Hallé Orchestra | Hallé Choir | Margaret Ritchie | — | Free Trade Hall, 15–16 June 1953 | |
| Sir Adrian Boult | London Philharmonic Orchestra | London Philharmonic Choir | Margaret Ritchie | John Gielgud | Kingsway Hall, 10–11 Dec 1953 | |
| André Previn | London Symphony Orchestra | Ambrosian Singers | Heather Harper | Ralph Richardson | Kingsway Hall, 14–16 Sept 1967 | |
| Sir Adrian Boult | London Philharmonic | London Philharmonic Choir | Norma Burrowes | — | Kingsway Hall, 18–21 Nov 1969 | |
| Ainslee Cox | American Symphony Orchestra | ASO Women's Chorus | Jacqueline Pierce | Franklin Williams | Carnegie Hall, 13 April 1970 | |
| Bernard Haitink | London Philharmonic | London Philharmonic Choir | Sheila Armstrong | — | Royal Festival Hall, 27 Nov 1984 | |
| Bernard Haitink | London Philharmonic | London Philharmonic Choir | Sheila Armstrong | — | EMI Abbey Road Studios, 28–29 Nov 1984 | |
| Gennady Rozhdestvensky | USSR State Symphony Orchestra | Chamber Choir of Moscow Conservatory | Elena Dof-donskaya | — | Philharmonia Building, Leningrad, 28 April 1989 | |
| Bryden Thomson | London Symphony Orchestra | LSO Chorus | Catherine Bott | — | St Jude-on-the-Hill, Hampstead, 19–22 June 1989 | |
| Vernon Handley | Royal Liverpool Philharmonic | Liverpool Philharmonic Choir | Alison Hargan | — | Philharmonic Hall, Liverpool, April 1990 | |
| Leonard Slatkin | Philharmonia Orchestra | Philharmonia Chorus | Linda Hohenfeld | — | Abbey Road, 28–29 Nov 1991 | |
| Raymond Leppard | Indianapolis Symphony Orchestra | Indianapolis Symphonic Choir | Dominique Labelle | — | Indianapolis Circle Theater, March 1–2, 1992 | |
| Andrew Davis | BBC Symphony Orchestra | BBC Symphony Chorus | Patricia Rozario | — | St Augustine's Church, London, March 1996 | |
| Kees Bakels | Bournemouth Symphony Orchestra | Waynflete Singers | Lynda Russell | David Timson | Poole Arts Centre, 6–7 Sept 1996 | |
| Sir Andrew Davis | Bergen Philharmonic | Bergen Philharmonic Choir, Grieg Kor | Mari Eriksmoen | — | Grieghallen, Bergen, 30 Jan to 2 Feb 2017 | |
| Andrew Manze | Royal Liverpool Philharmonic | Liverpool Philharmonic Choir | Rowan Pierce | Timothy West | Philharmonic Hall, Liverpool, 28 Sept 2018 | |
| Sir Mark Elder | Hallé Orchestra | Hallé Choir | Sophie Bevan | — | Bridgewater Hall, Manchester, 24 January 2019 | |
| Martyn Brabbins | BBC Symphony Orchestra | BBC Symphony Chorus | Elizabeth Watts | — | Watford Colosseum, 13 & 14 March 2022 | |

== Notes, references and sources ==
=== Sources ===
- Howes, Frank (1954). The Music of Ralph Vaughan Williams. London: Oxford University Press. OCLC 459433504.
- Kennedy, Michael (2002). The Film Music of Ralph Vaughan Williams. Colchester: Chandos. OCLC 173228673.
- Vaughan Williams, Ursula (1964). RVW: A Biography of Ralph Vaughan Williams. Oxford: Oxford University Press. ISBN 978-0-19-315411-7.
