= Vaughan Williams and English folk music =

The composer Ralph Vaughan Williams was one of the musicians who participated in the first English Folk Song revival, as well as using folk song tunes in his compositions. He collected his first song, Bushes and Briars, from Mr Charles Pottipher, a seventy-year-old labourer from Ingrave, Essex in 1903, and went on to collect over 800 songs, as well as some singing games and dance tunes. For 10 years he devoted up to 30 days a year to collecting folk songs from singers in 21 English counties, though Essex, Norfolk, Herefordshire and Sussex account for over two thirds of the songs in his collection. He recorded a small number of songs using a phonograph but the vast majority were recorded by hand. He was a regular contributor to the Folk Song Society's Journal, a member of the society's committee from 1904 to 1946, and when in that year the society amalgamated with the English Folk Dance Society he became president of the English Folk Dance and Song Society, a position he held until his death.

Vol. 2 no 8 of the Journal of the Folk Song Society was dedicated to 61 songs collected by Vaughan Williams from singers in Essex, Norfolk, Sussex, Wiltshire, Yorkshire, Kent and London. Book 2 of Cecil Sharp's series "Folk Songs of England", titled "Folk-songs from the eastern counties" published in 1908, consisted of 15 songs from Vaughan Williams's collection, from Essex, Norfolk and Cambridgeshire. Eight Traditional English Carols was published in 1919, and Twelve Traditional Carols From Herefordshire, written with song collector Ella Mary Leather in 1928. "The Penguin Book Of English Folk Songs" edited by Vaughan Williams and A L Lloyd was published in 1959 and "A Yacre Of Land: Sixteen Folk-songs From The Manuscript Collection Of Ralph Vaughan Williams" by Imogen Holst and Ursula Vaughan Williams was published in 1961. A large part of his collection has never been published. In his final decade, Vaughan Williams revisited the folk-song with two large-scale choral anthologies: the 1949 Folk Songs of the Four Seasons, and The First Nowell in 1958.

Roy Palmer commented: "On the whole, Vaughan Williams was more interested in the song than the singer, in the melody than the message." He often failed to record the texts of songs, and when he did write down texts often recorded only the first verse. The text of one song, The Long Whip, seems to have been lost completely as a result. Vaughan Williams knew that the texts of many of the songs he was preserving had been printed as broadsides and he sometimes used broadside texts to fill out his songs for publication. He did not bowdlerise the material he collected for publication, as some other collectors did, but was as much as they were forced to recognise the constraints of the time when it came to publishing "unsuitable" material. Sometimes too he failed to note singers' names or occupations.

== Sources ==
- Onderdonk, Julian (2013). "7. Folksong arrangements, hymn tunes and church music". In Alain Frogley and Aidan Thomson (ed.). The Cambridge Companion to Vaughan Williams. Cambridge: Cambridge University Press. pp. 136–156. ISBN 978-0-521-19768-7.
