= Byron Adams =

American musicologist (born 1955)

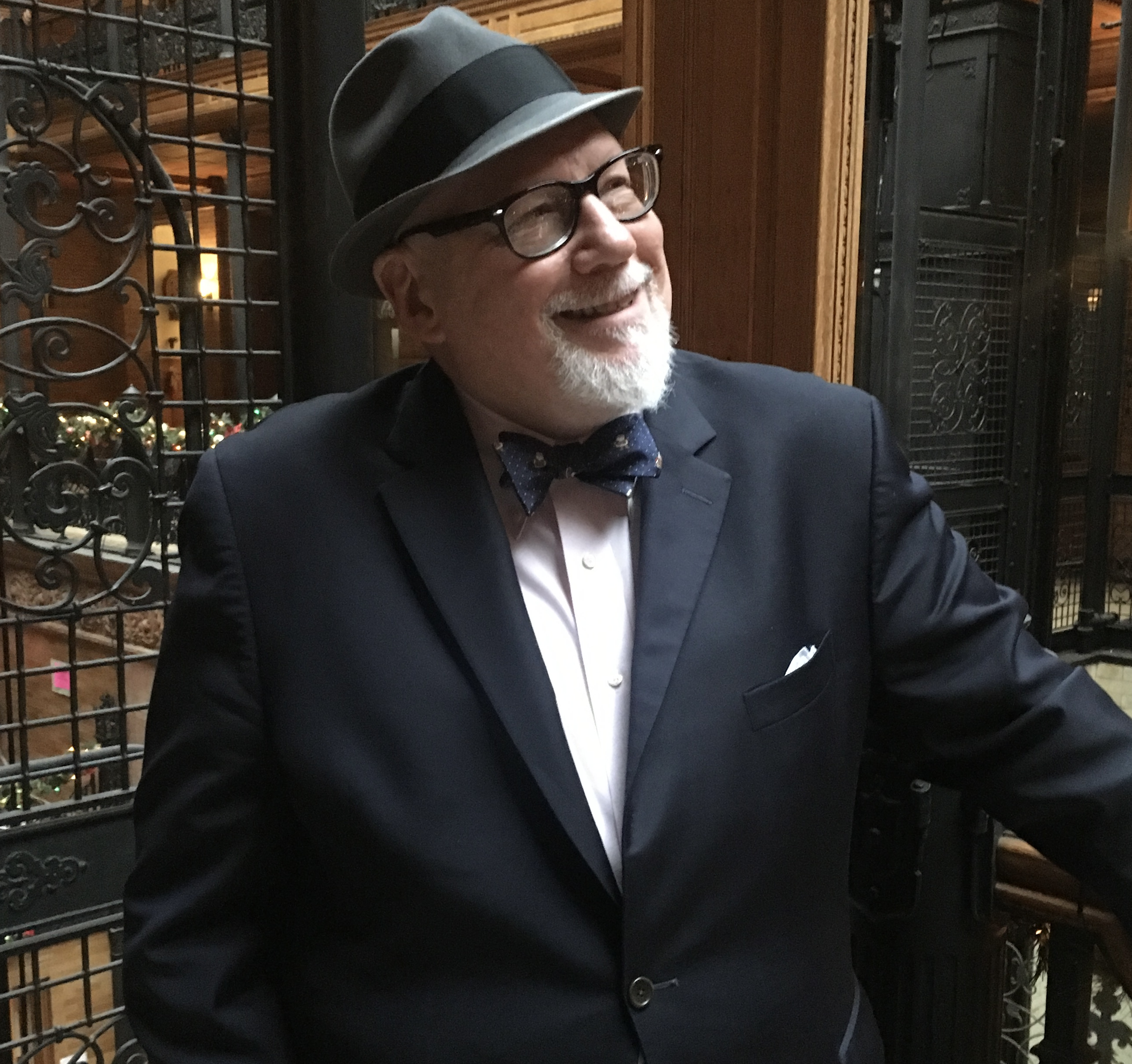
- Byron Adams c. 2017
- Born: 1955 (age 70–71)
- Occupations: Musicologist, composer, conductor
- Employer: University of California, Riverside
- Awards: Delius Festival Composition Grand Prize (1977); ASCAP Raymond Hubbell Award (1984); Ralph Vaughan Williams Fellowship (1985); Philip Brett Award (2000)

Byron Adams (born 1955) is an American musicologist, composer, and conductor.

== Education ==
Adams received his bachelor of music degree from Jacksonville University, his master of music degree from the University of Southern California, and his doctor of musical arts degree from Cornell University.

== Career ==
Adams is a composer of tonal music. His music was performed at the Warsaw Autumn, Bargemusic, the Da Camera Society of Los Angeles, and the Conservatoire Américain de Fontainebleau in Fontainebleau, France (where he taught in the summer of 1992), as well as by such ensembles as Cantus, the West Virginia Symphony Orchestra, and the Philharmonia Orchestra.

As a musicologist, Adams specializes in British and French music of the nineteenth and twentieth centuries. His essays have been published in The Musical Quarterly, where he served on the editorial board as an associate editor since 2009, and Music & Letters.

In 2007, he was appointed scholar-in-residence and a member of the program committee for the Bard Music Festival, for which he was the editor of Edward Elgar and His World (Princeton, 2007). He also gave pre-concert lectures and contributed program notes. Other notable organizations for which he has written programs notes include the Philadelphia Orchestra and the American Symphony Orchestra, among others. In 2013, Adams was appointed one of the series editors for Music in Britain 1600–2000, published by the Boydell Press.

== Academic career ==
Adams is distinguished professor at the music department of University of California, Riverside; he was department chair from 2002 to 2005.

== Honors, awards, and offices ==
As a composer Adams won the grand prize of the Delius Festival Composition Competition in 1977. In 1984, he was awarded an ASCAP Raymond Hubbell Award for his compositions, and in 1985 he was the recipient of the inaugural Ralph Vaughan Williams Fellowship. As a musicologist, he was the recipient of the American Musicological Society's Philip Brett Award in 2000.

Between 2006 and 2009, Adams served as vice president, then later president of the North American British Music Studies Association. In 2020, he was inducted as a lifetime honorary member. In 2008, the association instituted the Byron Adams Student Travel Grant, a fellowship offering assistance to conference presenters.

== Selected list of compositions ==
Publishers of works by Byron Adams include Earthsongs, Fatrock Ink, Editions BIM, Paraclete Press, and E.C. Schirmer

=== Orchestral works ===
- Monteverdiana for string orchestra (2021)
- Concerto for French Horn and Strings (2020)
- Overture to a Lyric Comedy for string orchestra (2003)
- Concerto for violoncello and orchestra (2001)
- Ballade for piano and orchestra (1999)
- Midsummer Music for orchestra (1998)
- Suite from Twelfth Night for flute, harp, percussion and strings (1995)
- Capriccio concertante for orchestra (1991)
- Concerto pour trompette et cordes (1981)

=== Chamber works ===
- String Quartet no. 1 "Ommagio a Monteverdi" (2018)
- Sonata for viola and piano (2012)
- Serenade for nine instruments (2011)
- Le Jardin Provençal for flute, oboe, 'cello and harpsichord (2006)
- Variationes alchemisticae for flute, viola, 'cello, and piano (2005)
- Suite on Old Nautical Airs for tuba and piano (1999)
- Sonata for trumpet and piano (1983)

=== Vocal music ===
- The Vision of Dame Julian of Norwich for soprano, harp, and string quartet (2002)
- Psalm XXIII for soprano and oboe (2000)
- Trois Poèmes de Ronsard for soprano, flute, harpsichord and 'cello (1999)
- Holy Songs for baritone and piano (1998)
- Quatre Illuminations for soprano and chamber ensemble (1991)
- Requiem Songs for soprano, violin, and 'cello (1982)

=== Choral music ===
- Missa "In Dulci Jubilo" for chorus and organ (2019)
- Eventide for male chorus (2012)
- Preces and Responses for a cappella chorus (2005)
- Evening Service in A major (2005)
- Praises of Jerusalem for chorus and organ (2003)
- Trois Illuminations for chamber chorus and harp (2000)
- Ashes of Soldiers for a cappella SATB chorus (1997)
- A Passerby for male chorus and piano (1993)
- An Irish Airman Foresees His Death for male chorus (1991)

=== Keyboard music ===
- Suite in Olden Style for organ solo (2018)
- Variations and Fugue on a Christmas Carol for organ solo (2017)
- Two Christmas Preludes for organ solo (2016)
- Trittico for piano duet (2014)
- Illuminations for piano solo (2008)

== Books, book chapters, and essays (partial list) ==
- Vaughan Williams Essays, ed. Byron Adams and Robin Wells, Aldershot: Ashgate Publishing Limited, 2003. 280 pp.
- Edward Elgar and His World, ed. Byron Adams (Princeton: Princeton University Press, 2007), 426 pp.
- "The Dark Saying of the Enigma: Homoeroticism and the Elgarian Paradox," in Queer Episodes in Music and Modern Identity, ed. Sophie Fuller and Lloyd Whitsell (University of Illinois Press, 2002).
- "Elgar's later oratorios: Roman Catholicism, decadence and the Wagnerian dialectic of shame and grace" in The Cambridge Companion to Elgar, ed. Daniel M. Grimley and Julian Rushton (Cambridge: Cambridge University Press, 2004), 81–105.
- "'Thor's Hammer': Sibelius and the British Music Critics", in the volume Sibelius and His World, ed. Daniel M. Grimley (Princeton University Press, 2011), 125–157.
- "Musical Cenotaph: Howell's Hymnus paradisi and Sites of Mourning", in the volume The Music of Herbert Howells (Woodbridge: Boydell & Brewer), 285–308.
- "Vaughan Williams' Musical Apprenticeship," The Cambridge Companion to Vaughan Williams, ed. Alain Frogley and Aidan J. Thomson (Cambridge: Cambridge University Press, 2013).
- "Sea Change: A meditation upon Frank Bridge's Lament: to Catherine, Aged 9, 'Lusitania' 1915," The Sea in the British Musical Imagination, ed. Eric Saylor and Christopher M. Scheer (Woodbridge: Boydell & Brewer, 2015).
- "Lux aeterna: Fauré's Requiem, Op. 48," Fauré Studies, ed. Stephen Rumph and Carlo Caballero (Cambridge: Cambridge University Press, 2021).
- "Scripture, Church and culture: biblical texts in the works of Ralph Vaughan Williams", Vaughan Williams Studies, ed. Alain Frogley, Cambridge University Press, 1996:99–117.
- "No Armpits, Please, We're British: Whitman and English Music, 1884–1936", in the volume Walt Whitman and Modern Music, ed. Lawrence Kramer, Garland Press, 2000: 25–42.
