= Muir Mathieson =

British conductor (1911–1975)

Muir Mathieson OBE
- Born: James Muir Mathieson; 24 January 1911; Stirling, Scotland
- Died: 2 August 1975 (aged 64); Oxford, Oxfordshire, England
- Education: Royal College of Music
- Occupations: Musician; composer; arranger; conductor; film director
- Years active: 1930s–1970s
- Employer: The Rank Organisation
- Organization: British Film Institute
- Spouse: Hermione Darnborough (m. 1935)
- Children: 4

James Muir Mathieson OBE (24 January 1911 – 2 August 1975) was a Scottish musician whose career was spent mainly as the musical director for British film studios.

Born in Scotland to a musical family, Mathieson won a scholarship to the Royal College of Music in London. His teachers there included Malcolm Sargent, who recommended him to the film producer Alexander Korda, whose musical director he became in 1934. Mathieson made most of his career in the film industry. After the Second World War, he was musical director to The Rank Organisation.

Among the composers from whom Mathieson commissioned film scores were Arthur Bliss, Ralph Vaughan Williams, William Walton and Benjamin Britten. Mathieson rarely wrote the music for the films on which he worked, considering himself to lack the talent for original composition, but he helped the composers who wrote for him to make their material precisely fit the action of the film, and he arranged concert suites from some of the scores he commissioned. He was responsible as musical director, arranger, conductor or occasionally composer for nearly a thousand films.

== Life and career ==
=== Early years ===
Mathieson was born in Stirling, Scotland, on 24 January 1911, the elder of the two sons of John George Mathieson (1880–1955), an artist and engraver, and his wife Jessie (née Davie; 1884–1954), a violinist, pianist and teacher. The younger son, Dock, followed Muir into the musical profession and became a conductor and musical director in British films. Jessie ("Jen") Mathieson was a talented musician, who among other engagements, foreshadowed her sons' careers by playing the piano accompaniment for silent films at the local cinema. As a teenager, Mathieson formed and conducted a youth orchestra in Stirling.

After attending Stirling High School Mathieson, attended the Royal College of Music in London from February 1929, winning a succession of scholarships. At the college, he studied piano with Arthur Benjamin and conducting with Malcolm Sargent. (Note: In her biography of Ralph Vaughan Williams, his widow, Ursula, states that Mathieson also studied under her husband at the Royal College, but this is not substantiated in the biographies of Mathieson by Hetherington or Youdell.) As a student, his talent for conducting attracted attention. The Times singled him out, commenting that in his handling of a college production of Benjamin's musical farce The Devil Take Her, Mathieson "made the points of a witty score pointedly". While still a student he undertook a range of jobs, from conducting a choir of Welsh miners, to touring Canada conducting a ballet company, and taking the baton for an amateur production of The Pirates of Penzance.

=== Korda ===
Mathieson graduated from the college in 1933, and Sargent recommended him to Alexander Korda as a conductor and assistant to Kurt Schröder, musical director of Korda's new company, London Films. When Mathieson joined Korda's team the film industry was refining synchronised sound on film, with recorded music accompanying the on-screen images. According to Mathieson's biographer Andrew Youdell, Schröder contributed "a reasonable though hardly memorable background score" to Korda's first major success, The Private Life of Henry VIII (1933), after which political developments in Continental Europe led him to return to his native Germany in 1934, succeeded as Korda's head of music by Mathieson.

Away from the film studio, Mathieson conducted Kurt Weill's A Kingdom for a Cow at the Savoy Theatre in June 1935. This was a revised version of the thus-far unstaged Der Kuhhandel. Despite good notices it was not a success.

On 21 December 1935, at the Brompton Oratory, London, Mathieson married Hermione Louise Alys Darnborough, principal ballerina of Sadler's Wells Ballet. Two years earlier, when already engaged to be married, they had both taken part in Hiawatha at the Royal Albert Hall in London, when Mathieson deputised at a few minutes' notice after the scheduled conductor, Sargent, was taken ill during a performance of the piece, in which Darnborough danced the role of the Spirit of Spring. They had one son and three daughters, among them the actress Fiona Mathieson (1951–1987) later known for her appearances in the BBC radio serial The Archers.

Youdell comments that Mathieson's name appeared so frequently on film credits as musical director that there grew a widespread assumption that he composed the music, but in fact he preferred to commission scores from other musicians, believing himself to have little talent for original composition. Arthur Jacobs comments in Grove's Dictionary of Music and Musicians, "more than anyone else, he was responsible for the British practice of engaging independent composers for films, instead of maintaining (as did Hollywood) a localized core of 'film composers'". He was dubbed the "Tsar of music for British films"; the composer James Bernard wrote, "If you wanted to write music for films at that time you had to be 'in' with Muir". Mathieson believed that music written for the screen could not only become an integral part of the film but could be an entity in itself, on a par with theatrical incidental music written by Grieg for Peer Gynt and Mendelssohn for A Midsummer Night's Dream. He admired the technical skill with which Hollywood composers fitted their music to the action, but judged British scores to have "more intrinsic musical value". He quoted with approval Vaughan Williams's comment that film "contains potentialities for the combination of all the arts such as Wagner never dreamt of." (Note: Wagner had propounded a theory of Gesamtkunstwerk ("total work of art") combining all the arts – visual, musical and literary – in a single stage work.)

While Mathieson was in charge of music for Korda, a range of composers provided scores, including his old teacher, Arthur Benjamin, and Richard Addinsell, Georges Auric, Miklos Rozsa, and Arthur Bliss. Benjamin wrote scores for The Scarlet Pimpernel (1934) and The Return of the Scarlet Pimpernel (1937); Addinsell wrote for Dark Journey (1937), Farewell Again (1937), South Riding (1937), and Fire Over England (1936); Auric composed the score for The Man Who Could Work Miracles (1936), Rozsa for The Four Feathers (1939) and The Thief of Baghdad (1940), and Bliss for Things to Come (1935). The last of these was regarded as a landmark in film music, and the score was quickly arranged into a concert suite, becoming a best-seller for Decca when released on record.

=== Second World War ===
With the outbreak of the Second World War in September 1939 Mathieson became musical director to the Ministry of Information, the Royal Air Force, and army film units. By now he had considerable experience of commissioning film scores, and he approached the veteran Ralph Vaughan Williams, generally regarded as the most important living British composer. Vaughan Williams gladly agreed to help the war effort by writing film music – a genre wholly new to him – for Powell and Pressburger's propaganda film 49th Parallel (1941). Working with Mathieson, Vaughan Williams quickly grasped the split-hair timings of film music: "a second of music meant exactly a second of music", and he enjoyed working with the studio team. Mathieson conducted the London Symphony Orchestra (LSO) in the finished score, with the composer at the sessions, ready to "cut, enlarge, alter, adapt" as necessary. Vaughan Williams wrote a second score for Mathieson: Coastal Command (1942), made under the auspices of the Crown Film Unit. (Note: Vaughan Williams later provided the score for the film Scott of the Antarctic (1948), which he reworked as his seventh symphony – the Sinfonia antartica (1953) – but the film score was not commissioned by Mathieson, but by his brother Dock as assistant musical director to Ernest Irving at Ealing Studios.)

Mathieson worked with many other composers during the war; apart from those with Vaughan Williams, his most conspicuous collaboration was with William Walton on Laurence Olivier's film of Shakespeare's Henry V (1944). Mathieson and Walton had worked together on five films before then: Escape Me Never (1935), As You Like It (1936), and three war films: The Next of Kin (1941), Went the Day Well? and The First of the Few (both 1942). In 1944, with Olivier's backing, Mathieson asked Walton to provide the music for the spectacular Technicolor adaptation of Shakespeare's play. Youdell describes the film of Henry V as "one of the greatest and most imaginative productions of the war period" and Walton's score as of "almost unparalleled beauty in its melody, orchestration, and construction".

Walton did not share Mathieson's view that film music could or should be adapted for the concert hall or recording – he said, "Film music is not good film music if it can be used for any other purpose" – but he allowed Mathieson to arrange a concert suite from the Henry V music. Walton conducted a recording of it in 1963, though he later told André Previn that he found the suite "rather tame" compared with the original film score. During the war Mathieson conducted frequent public concerts, sometimes programming suites from other film scores that he had commissioned.

=== Post-war ===
By the end of the war Mathieson had become musical director for the Rank Organisation, which included several film-making units, such as Two Cities, The Archers, and Cineguild. He supervised the music of most of the major films produced under the Rank banner, continuing to engage leading composers including Richard Addinsell (Blithe Spirit 1945), William Alwyn (Odd Man Out, 1946), Arnold Bax (Oliver Twist, 1948), Bliss (Men of Two Worlds, 1946), Walter Goehr (Great Expectations, 1946) and Walton (Hamlet, 1948). For the 1945 film of Noël Coward's Brief Encounter Mathieson relaxed his insistence on newly commissioned music, and at Coward's behest arranged and conducted Rachmaninoff's Second Piano Concerto with Eileen Joyce as soloist. He also conducted the London Symphony Orchestra in The Seventh Veil.

In 1946 Mathieson extended his activities to directing, with Instruments of the Orchestra, a twenty-minute film for use in schools, showing the various instruments of the symphony orchestra playing separately and together. He commissioned a new work from Benjamin Britten: The Young Person's Guide to the Orchestra, with a narration written by Britten's current librettist, Eric Crozier. Sargent conducted the LSO as well as delivering the narration to camera. The music won a permanent place in the worldwide concert repertoire, and has become Britten's most widely played and popular piece.

In The Magic Box (1951), a film made to mark the Festival of Britain, Mathieson appeared as a cast member, in a cameo role as Sir Arthur Sullivan conducting a choir. During the early 1950s, Youdell writes, Mathieson continued to be "a principal force in the musical design of British feature films", commissioning music from new film composers including Malcolm Arnold (The Sound Barrier, 1952) and Larry Adler (Genevieve, 1953). (Note: Genevieve's American distributors insisted that Adler's name must be removed from the credits because of his continuing refusal to co-operate with Joseph McCarthy and the House Un-American Activities Committee. The score was nominated for an Oscar, but Adler was not mentioned in the nomination.) In 1955 Mathieson commissioned another score from Walton, this time for Olivier's Richard III. Among Mathieson's other 1950s commissions were Arnold's score for Hobson's Choice (1954), Addinsell's for The Prince and the Showgirl (1957), and Alwyn's for Carve Her Name With Pride and A Night to Remember (both 1958).

In his later years, Mathieson worked as a freelance music director. He commissioned the score of Interpol (1956) from the nineteen-year-old Richard Rodney Bennett. In 1958 he was invited to conduct Bernard Herrmann's score for Alfred Hitchcock's film Vertigo; it was to have been recorded in the US, but because of a musicians' strike there Mathieson conducted the recording in Vienna. In 1966 he wrote and directed a series of twenty-four short films, collectively entitled We Make Music.

His biographer S. J. Hetherington records that Mathieson arranged, directed, conducted, and occasionally composed, the music for almost one thousand films during his career. In addition to his work in films he conducted in the concert hall, particularly with youth orchestras. He was appointed OBE for his services to music, and was a governor of the British Film Institute.

Mathieson died at the Radcliffe Infirmary, Oxford, on 2 August 1975, aged 64, survived by his widow, who died in October 2010.

== Bibliography ==
- Carpenter, Humphrey (1992). Benjamin Britten: A Biography. London: Faber and Faber. ISBN 978-0-571-14324-5.
- Cobbe, Hugh (2010) [2008]. Letters of Ralph Vaughan Williams. Oxford: Oxford University Press. ISBN 978-0-19-958764-3.
- Hetherington, S. J. (2006). Muir Mathieson: A Life in Film Music. Dalkeith: Scottish Cultural Press. ISBN 978-1-89-821811-1.
- Huckvale, David (2006). James Bernard, Composer to Count Dracula: A Critical Biography. Jefferson: McFarland. ISBN 978-0-78-642302-6.
- Kennedy, Michael (1989). Portrait of Walton. Oxford: Oxford University Press. ISBN 978-0-19-816705-1.
- Lloyd, Stephen (1999). "Film Music". In Craggs, Stewart (ed.). William Walton: Music and Literature. Aldershot: Ashgate. ISBN 978-1-85-928190-1.
- McFarlane, Brian, ed. (2005). The Encyclopedia of British Film (second ed.). London: Methuen. ISBN 978-0-413-77526-9.
- Mander, Raymond; Mitchenson, Joe (1962). A Picture History of Gilbert and Sullivan. London: Vista Books. OCLC 469979595.
- Mathieson, Muir (December 1944). "Aspects of Film Music". Tempo (9): 7–9. JSTOR 943648. (subscription required)
- Matthews, David (2013). Britten. London: Haus Publishing. ISBN 978-1-908323-38-5.
- Reid, Charles (1968). Malcolm Sargent: A Biography. London: Hamish Hamilton. ISBN 978-0-24-191316-1.
- Schebera, Jürgen (1995). Kurt Weill: An Illustrated Life. New Haven: Yale University Press. ISBN 978-0-30-006055-3.
- Vaughan Williams, Ursula (1964). RVW: A Biography of Ralph Vaughan Williams. Oxford: Oxford University Press. ISBN 978-0-19-315411-7.
