= Wanted for Murder (film) =

- Directed by: Lawrence Huntington
- Written by: Emeric Pressburger; Rodney Ackland Maurice Cowan (additional dialogue)
- Based on: Wanted for Murder (play) by Terence De Marney and Percy Robinson
- Produced by: Marcel Hellman
- Starring: Eric Portman; Dulcie Gray; Derek Farr; Roland Culver
- Cinematography: Max Greene
- Edited by: Edward B. Jarvis
- Music by: Mischa Spoliansky
- Production company: Excelsior Productions
- Distributed by: 20th Century Fox; Exclusive Films; Bejöhr-Film KG
- Release dates: 23 May 1946 (London); 2 November 1946 (USA)
- Running time: 102 minutes
- Country: United Kingdom
- Language: English

Wanted for Murder is a 1946 British crime film directed by Lawrence Huntington and starring Eric Portman, Dulcie Gray, Derek Farr, and Roland Culver.

== Plot ==
Anne Fielding is delayed on the London Underground, making her late for a meeting with her friend Victor James Colebrooke. She meets Jack Williams who is also delayed. The two take an immediate liking to each other. After they emerge from the Underground Jack helps her to locate Victor.

Victor, the grandson of a notorious hangman, is gradually becoming insane and unable to resist the urge to strangle women to death. He is in love with Anne, but he does not know how much longer he can prevent himself from killing her. Inspector Conway investigates Victor's murders and pieces together the evidence that Victor leaves behind.

== Cast ==
- Eric Portman as Victor James Colebrooke
- Dulcie Gray as Anne Fielding
- Derek Farr as Jack Williams
- Roland Culver as Chief Inspector Conway
- Stanley Holloway as Sergeant Sullivan
- Barbara Everest as Mrs Colebrooke
- Bonar Colleano as Corporal Nick Mappolo
- Jenny Laird as Jeannie McLaren
- Kathleen Harrison as Florrie
- Bill Shine as Detective Ellis
- Viola Lyel as Mabel Cooper
- John Salew as Detective Walters
- John Ruddock as Glover, the tramp
- Edna Wood as Miss Kemp
- George Carney as Boat Rental Agent
- Wilfrid Hyde-White as Guide in Madame Tussaud's (as Wilfred Hyde White)

== Music ==
The score, by the Russian-born émigré composer Mischa Spoliansky, includes extracts from a fake piano concerto, A Voice in the Night using the soloist Eric Harrison. It is an example of the so-called Denham Concerto, a term coined by Steve Race to describe the short romantic pieces, written for piano and orchestra for use in film scores, which became popular in Britain during the 1940s and 1950s, inspired by the success of Richard Addinsell's Warsaw Concerto, composed for the film Dangerous Moonlight in 1941. Like the Warsaw Concerto and Hubert Bath's Cornish Rhapsody (from Love Story, 1944), A Voice in the Night was released commercially.

== Production ==
The film was based on a play by Terence de Marney and Percy Robinson, which debuted on stage in London in 1937. De Marney played the killer in the original production.

In January 1946 it was announced that 20th Century Fox had signed a deal with Marcel Hellman to make the film, for which Fox put up 50 per cent of the budget.

The screenplay was one of two that Emeric Pressburger wrote for Hellman, the other being for Men Against Britannia.

The film was shot at Welwyn Studios and at Star House, 14, The Royal Exchange, Chelsea Embankment, Chelsea, used as the home of Eric Portman's character and his mother (Barbara Everest). There were also scenes filmed at Scotland Yard.

In April 1946 Spyros Skouras signed a three-picture deal with Hellman for 20th Century Fox to distribute three of Hellman's films. The first was to be Wanted for Murder, which had been completed. (The other films were Meet Me at Dawn and This Was a Woman.)
