= Denham Concerto =

Diegetic film music trend popular in the 1940s

Denham Concerto is a term coined by Steve Race to describe a popular musical trend in 1940s British and American cinema, particularly associated with Alexander Korda's Denham Film Studios. It denotes a short, highly romantic, single-movement concerto (mostly with piano) composed specifically to serve as a diegetic plot device. In the United States such pieces have been termed "tabloid concertos".

The main character in the film is almost always a performer or composer. The audience watches them compose, practice or perform the piece on screen. In many cases the on-screen diegetic piano music is supplemented by the large, non-diegetic studio orchestra as the scenes intensify. Often, a high pressure concert is used as a focal point of the plot.

The music was typically composed by the same composer providing the non-diegetic score of the film, though some films used existing music for similar purposes. They are not full concertos in the strict, classical sense, and only fragmented cues or short extracts of the music are usually heard on screen. In some examples, the composer (or others) completed or adapted the work later for concert performance purposes, often due to popular demand.

The Warsaw Concerto from the 1941 film Dangerous Moonlight is the most famous example, and the first to be actually produced at Denham Studios in 1941, during the blitz. It has been suggested that use of the concerto form often serves as a metaphor for the dramatic struggle against obstacles endured by the lead character in the film.

== Examples ==
- The Case of the Frightened Lady (1940): music by Jack Beaver, and actually performed by the lead actor Marius Goring, who was a talented pianist. Perhaps the first architype of the Denham Concerto, though made at the Beaconsfield Film Studios rather than at Denham. The music, Portrait of Isla, is woven into the story.
- Dangerous Moonlight (1941): music by Richard Addinsell, performed off-screen by Louis Kentner. The Warsaw Concerto is composed for the film's protagonist, a Polish pianist and fighter pilot. Addinsell was specifically asked to compose a complete piece in the style of Rachmaninoff. Its popularity led to immediate demand, and a nine minute recording (not as heard in the film), was put together from the soundtrack and issued on two sides of a 12 inch record playing at 78 RPM. The sheet music for a piano solo version was also published.
- Love Story (1944): music by Hubert Bath, performed off-screen by Harriet Cohen, who worked with actress Margaret Lockwood to teach her the piece for the sake of realism. A terminally ill pianist races to finish a performance before she dies. Bath did not score the complete film, but was asked to create a specific piece, the Cornish Rhapsody, which was recorded by Cohen and the London Symphony Orchestra, conducted by Bath, on 4 November 1944.
- The Beast with Five Fingers (1945): Music by Max Steiner, performed off-screen by Ervin Nyíregyházi (also hand double) and Warner Bros pianist Victor Aller. The occupants of an isolated Italian villa are stalked by the severed, crawling hand of a recently deceased pianist. Steiner weaves Brahms' arrangement for piano left hand of Bach's Chaconne (originally for solo violin) into his score.
- Hangover Square (1945): music by Bernard Hermann, performed off-screen by Ignace Hilsberg, though lead actor Laird Cregar, also a musician, wanted to play it himself. In this American film, composer George Harvey Bone is confronted with his crimes at the premiere of his concerto. As a concert piece it was slightly revised by Herrmann in 1973 as the Concerto Macabre. The style is Lisztian rather than the usual rhapsodic romantic.
- The Seventh Veil (1945): Music by Benjamin Frankel, performed off-screen by Eileen Joyce. The film concerns a brilliant concert pianist suffering from a delusion that she has lost the use of her hands. Frankel used his own music, alongside pieces and extracts of music by Chopin, Mozart, Beethoven, Grieg and Rachmaninoff.
- Spellbound (1945): music by Miklós Rózsa, performed off-screen by the film's music director Audray Granville, who considerably altered Rózsa's score. The music is non-diegetic and not used as a plot device, but producer David O. Selznick made innovative use of promotional recordings for radio broadcasts that built its popularity beyond the film. Rozsa reconstructed a version for the recording Music from Alfred Hitchcock's Picture Spellbound (ARA Records, 1945, on four 78 RPM discs), performed by piano duo Rack Godwin and Eadie Griffith. He eventually prepared a full-scale Spellbound Concerto for piano, theremin, and orchestra.
- Deception (1946): music by Erich Korngold, performed on-screen by cellist Eleanor Aller. It is heard in the film for seven minutes, and the score (in Korngold's hand) is also glimpsed on screen. He immediately re-worked and expanded the music for the concert hall as his one movement Cello Concerto in C major, op. 37.
- Men of Two Worlds (1946): music by Arthur Bliss, performed off-screen by Eileen Joyce. The film tells the tale of a Tanganyikan concert pianist returning from studies in England to Africa, and opens with a performance of 'Kisenga's Piano Concerto'. From this a longer concert piece was extracted as Baraza (1946), and recorded on a Decca 78 with Muir Mathieson conducting Joyce and the National Symphony Orchestra.
- Wanted for Murder (1946): music by Mischa Spoliansky, performed off-screen by Eric Harrison. The piece, A Voice in the Night, is used in this film as both diegetic and non-diegetic music.
- While I Live (1947): music by Charles Williams, performed off-screen by Arthur Dulay. The film concerns a composer who dies after finishing her piano masterpiece The Dream of Olwen, which is then used to keep her memory alive.

== Other diegetic pieces ==
Other music composed as diegetic plot devices for film, but not framed as concertos, include: the choral Storm Clouds Cantata by Arthur Benjamin for the 1934 film The Man Who Knew Too Much and the 1956 remake; 'Salammbô's Aria' for Citizen Kane (1941) from a fictional opera, composed by Bernard Herrmann; the orchestral ballet score for The Red Shoes (1948) by Brian Easdale; and the opera at the centre of The Glass Mountain (1949), composed by Nino Rota, and starring opera singers Tito Gobbi and Elena Rizzieri playing themselves.

== See also ==
Films about fictional pianists
