= The Case of the Frightened Lady =

The Case of the Frightened Lady may refer to:

- The Case of the Frightened Lady (play), a 1931 play by Edgar Wallace
- The Case of the Frightened Lady (film), a 1940 film adaptation
- The Frightened Lady (1932 film), a 1932 British film directed by T. Hayes Hunter also adapted from the play
