= The Frightened Lady =

The Frightened Lady may refer to:

- The Frightened Lady (1932 film), known in the US as Criminal at Large, a 1932 British film directed by T. Hayes Hunter
- The Case of the Frightened Lady (film) (aka The Frightened Lady), a 1940 British film directed by George King

== See also ==
- Frightened Lady, Track 8 of the studio album Confessions of the Mind of The Hollies
