= The Case of the Frightened Lady (film) =

1940 British film by George King

- Trade show advertisement
- Directed by: George King
- Written by: Edward Dryhurst (screenplay); Robert Stevenson (uncredited)
- Based on: play by Edgar Wallace
- Produced by: S.W. Smith
- Starring: Marius Goring; Helen Haye; Penelope Dudley Ward
- Cinematography: Hone Glendinning
- Edited by: Leslie Norman
- Music by: Jack Beaver
- Production company: George King Productions (as Pennant Pictures)
- Distributed by: British Lion Film Corporation (UK)
- Release date: 28 September 1940 (UK)
- Running time: 81 minutes
- Country: United Kingdom
- Language: English

The Case of the Frightened Lady is a 1940 British, black-and-white, crime, drama, mystery thriller, directed by George King and starring Marius Goring as Lord Lebanon, Helen Haye as Lady Lebanon, Penelope Dudley Ward as Isla Crane, George Merritt as Detective Inspector Tanner, Ronald Shiner as Detective Sergeant Totty and Felix Aylmer as Dr Amersham. It was produced by Pennant Picture Productions and presented by British Lion Film Corporation, made at their studios in Beaconsfield. The film is based on the 1931 play by Edgar Wallace.

This production was the second time that Wallace’s play had been adapted for the cinema. The first production in 1932 was directed by T. Hayes Hunter and starred Emlyn Williams. The BBC also produced two television versions; the first in 1938 and the second in 1983 which starred Warren Clarke and Virginia McKenna.

In 2008, the film was released on DVD by Odeon Entertainment as part of their 'Best of British' collection. Prior to this release, the film had not been seen in public since its original release.

== Plot ==
The story is a thriller that revolves around the Lebanon family who live at Mark’s Priory. Lady Lebanon tells her son, William, Lord Lebanon that he must marry his cousin Isla Crane to continue the family line. However, William has no intention of marrying Isla and matters are made more complicated due to Isla falling in love with an architect, Richard Ferraby, who has come to Mark’s Priory to draw up renovation plans. At the same time the strange behaviour of two footmen and the family physician add to the mystery surrounding the family. Eventually rumour and speculation lead to a murderous conclusion.

== Music ==
The score, by Jack Beaver, includes perhaps the first example of a Romantic style, diegetic Denham Concerto composed especially for film, a year before Richard Addinsell's much more famous Warsaw Concerto appeared in the film Dangerous Moonlight (1941). Here the piano is actually played by Marius Goring as Lord Lebanon. Goring was an accomplished player whose mother Kate Winifred was a professional pianist who had studied with Clara Schumann.

== Cast ==
- Marius Goring as 'Willie', Lord Lebanon
- Penelope Dudley Ward as Isla Crane
- Helen Haye as Dowager Lady Lebanon
- Felix Aylmer as Dr Lester Charles Amersham
- George Merritt as Detective Inspector William Tanner
- Ronald Shiner as Sergeant Totty
- Patrick Barr as Richard Ferraby
- Roy Emerton as Gilder
- George Hayes as Brooks
- John Warwick as Studd, The Chauffeur
- Elizabeth Scott as Jackson, the maid
- Torin Thatcher as Jim Tilling, the gamekeeper
- Mavis Clair as Mrs Tilling
- Roddy Hughes as vicar

== Critical reception ==
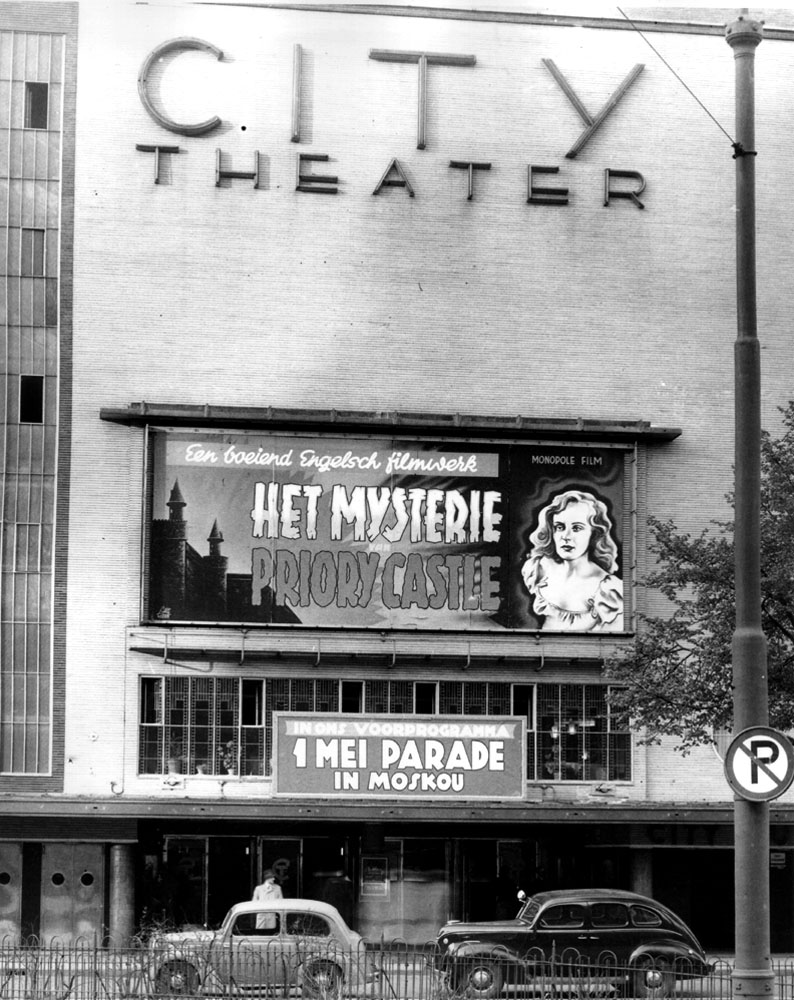
The film being shown at a cinema in Amsterdam.

The New York Times wrote, "the sort of thing Edgar Wallace could make intriguing on paper—or, on the stage, as he did in telling of the horrendous doings at Mark's Priory in Criminal at Large about ten years ago. But the old shocker has lost most of its punch...There are several reasons why Frightened Lady doesn't come off as it should. One is that Director George King has not evidenced any regard for suspense, the other is that the performances, on the whole, are uninspired. But perhaps the real reason is that the story itself is outmoded for cinematic treatment"; while Britmovie called it "a tightly written murder mystery...probably one of the best scored films of the 1940s, with the piano dirges being played throughout the movie, “The Case of the Frightened Lady” is a fast moving story... (it) remains a classic for those who enjoy this genre of film"; and Vérité noted "a fun and feisty thriller that unlike so many modern films, doesn't outstay its welcome."
