= Blithe Spirit (1945 film) =

Film by David Lean

- US theatrical release poster
- Directed by: David Lean
- Screenplay by: David Lean; Ronald Neame; Anthony Havelock-Allan
- Based on: Blithe Spirit by Noël Coward
- Produced by: Noël Coward
- Starring: Rex Harrison; Constance Cummings; Kay Hammond; Margaret Rutherford
- Cinematography: Ronald Neame
- Edited by: Jack Harris
- Music by: Richard Addinsell
- Production company: Two Cities Films
- Distributed by: General Film Distributors
- Release date: 14 May 1945
- Running time: 96 minutes
- Country: United Kingdom
- Language: English

Blithe Spirit is a 1945 British supernatural black comedy film directed by David Lean. The screenplay by Lean, cinematographer Ronald Neame and associate producer Anthony Havelock-Allan, is based on Noël Coward's 1941 play of the same name, the title of which is derived from the line "Hail to thee, blithe Spirit! Bird thou never wert" in the poem "To a Skylark" by Percy Bysshe Shelley. The song "Always", written by Irving Berlin, is an important plot element in Blithe Spirit.

The film features Kay Hammond and Margaret Rutherford, in the roles they created in the original production, along with Rex Harrison and Constance Cummings in the lead parts of Charles and Ruth Condomine. While unsuccessful at the box office and a disappointing adaptation for the screen, according to Coward, it has since come to be considered notable for its Technicolor photography and Oscar-winning visual effects in particular and has been re-released several times, notably as one of the ten early David Lean features restored by the British Film Institute for release in 2008.

== Plot ==
Seeking background material for a novel of the occult he is writing, author Charles Condomine invites eccentric medium Madame Arcati to his home in Lympne, Kent, to conduct a séance. As Charles, his wife Ruth and their guests, George and Violet Bradman, barely restrain themselves from laughing, Madame Arcati performs peculiar rituals and finally goes into a trance. Charles then hears the voice of his dead first wife, Elvira. When he discovers that the others cannot hear her, he evasively passes off his odd behaviour as a joke. When Arcati recovers, she is certain that something extraordinary has occurred, but everyone else denies it.

After Madame Arcati and the Bradmans have left, Charles is unable to convince Ruth that he had been serious about hearing his late wife. Elvira soon appears in the room, but only to Charles. He becomes both dismayed and amused by the situation. He tries to convince Ruth that Elvira is present, but Ruth thinks Charles is trying to play her for the fool, so becoming rather upset, she quickly retires for the night. The following evening, Elvira reappears, further confounding the situation. Relations between Charles and Ruth become strained until he persuades Elvira to act as a poltergeist and transport a vase and a chair in front of Ruth. As Elvira continues her antics, Ruth becomes frightened and runs out of the room.

Ruth seeks Madame Arcati's help in sending Elvira back where she came from, but the medium confesses that she does not know quite how to do so. Ruth warns her disbelieving husband that Elvira is seeking to be reunited with him by arranging his mortal demise. However, ghostly Elvira's mischievous plan backfires; as a result, it is Ruth, not Charles, who drives off in the car she has tampered with and ends up dead. A vengeful Ruth, now too in spirit form, harasses Elvira to the point where she wants to depart the earthly realm.

In desperation, Charles seeks Madame Arcati's help. Various incantations fail, until Arcati realises that it was the Condomines' maid Edith who summoned Elvira. Arcati appears to succeed in sending the spirits away, but it soon becomes clear that both have remained. Acting on Madame Arcati's suggestion, Charles sets out on a long vacation, but he has a fatal accident (implied to be the work of Ruth and Elvira) while driving away and joins his late wives as a spirit himself.

== Cast ==
- Rex Harrison as Charles Condomine
- Constance Cummings as Ruth Condomine
- Kay Hammond as Elvira Condomine
- Margaret Rutherford as Madame Arcati
- Hugh Wakefield as Doctor George Bradman
- Joyce Carey as Violet Bradman
- Jacqueline Clarke as Edith
- Marie Ault as Cook (uncredited)
- Johnnie Schofield as man directing traffic (uncredited)
- Noël Coward as narrator (uncredited)

== Production ==
Coward had turned down offers from Hollywood to sell the film rights, stating that previous American versions of his plays had been "vulgarized, distorted and ruined". The rights were instead sold to Cineguild, one of the independent companies supported by the Rank Organization. The film was shot in Technicolor and marked Lean's first attempt at directing comedy after working on two straight films In Which We Serve and This Happy Breed, both also written by Noël Coward. The film was shot at Denham Studios in May 1944.

Anthony Havelock-Allan regarded the film as a "failure" because of its casting, which he said Coward insisted on:

The point of the play is a middle-aged man well into his second marriage, having long ago put away the follies of his youth with his sexy first wife, and suddenly being 'woken up' by her reappearance as a ghost. Rex Harrison was not middle-aged; and Kay Hammond, though a brilliant stage actress, didn't photograph well and also had a very slow delivery, which was difficult in films. When we started shooting scenes with Kay and Rex it became obvious that Constance Cummings [the second wife] looked more attractive to the average man in the street than Kay. This upset the whole play.

Havelock-Allan thought better casting for the male lead would be Cecil Parker who replaced Coward on stage. Rex Harrison made the film after having been in the services for several years. He later wrote in his memoirs:

Blithe Spirit was not a play I liked, and I certainly didn't think much of the film we made of it. David Lean directed it, but the shooting was unimaginative and flat, a filmed stage play. He didn't direct me too well, either – he hasn't a great sense of humour ... By that time it was over three years since I'd done any acting, and I can remember feeling a bit shaky about it, and almost, but not quite, as strange as when I'd first started, but Lean did something to me on that film which I shall never forget, and which was unforgivable in any circumstances. I was trying to make one of those difficult Noel Coward scenes work ... when David said: "I don't think that's very funny." And he turned round to the cameraman, Ronnie Neame, and said: "Did you think that was funny, Ronnie?" Ronnie said: "Oh, no, I didn't think it was funny." So what do you do next, if it isn't funny?

Two houses in Buckinghamshire were used for exteriors: Denham Mount (Charles and Ruth's home) and another in Cheapside Lane (Madame Arcati's house).

The play had been a major success, and Coward advised Lean not to jeopardise this with the adaptation, telling him "Just photograph it, dear boy". In spite of this, Lean made a number of changes such as adding exterior scenes, whereas the play had been set entirely in a single room, showing scenes like the car journey to Folkestone which had only been referred to in the play. Perhaps most importantly, the final scene, in which Charles dies and joins his two wives as a spirit, does not occur in the play, which ends with his leaving his house after taunting his former wives, of whom he is now free. Coward objected strenuously to this change, charging Cineguild with having ruined the best play he ever wrote.

Margaret Rutherford said that the film "seemed to go on for ever", taking six months instead of the planned twelve weeks because of difficulties involving the colour stock.

As with most of Coward's work, Blithe Spirit is renowned for its sophisticated dialogue. During an argument with Ruth, Charles declares, "If you're trying to compile an inventory of my sex life, I feel it only fair to warn you that you've omitted several episodes. I shall consult my diary and give you a complete list after lunch." The line, considered extremely risqué by censors, was deleted from the US release.

== Home media ==
Blithe Spirit was released on VHS on 6 July 1995. In September 2004, MGM released the film on DVD in the United States as one of eight titles included in the David Lean Collection. Criterion released the box sets David Lean Directs Noël Coward on Region A Blu-ray and Region 1 DVD in the US in 2012, both of which contained Blithe Spirit. This release features a new high-definition digital transfer of the BFI National Archive's 2008 restoration, with an uncompressed monaural soundtrack on the Blu-ray. In the UK, the rights are owned by ITV and the film has been released three times on DVD, with the last release containing newly restored film and audio.

== Reception ==
=== Box office ===
Blithe Spirit was included as one of the "British runners up" on Kinematograph Weekly's list of the most successful films of 1945 at the British box office.

=== Critical response ===
Although it received positive critical reviews, the film was a commercial disappointment on both sides of the Atlantic, but it is now widely regarded as a classic.

In 1945, Variety observed:

"Inasmuch as this is largely a photographed copy of the stage play ... the camerawork is outstandingly good and helps to put across the credibility of the ghost story more effectively than the flesh and blood performance does. Acting honours go to Margaret Rutherford as Mme Arcati, a trance medium who makes you believe she's on the level. There is nothing ethereal about this 200-pounder. Her dynamic personality has all the slapdash of Fairbanks Sr in his prime."

In The Nation in 1945, critic James Agee wrote, "The ghost, who faintly suggest a bidet out of repair, is very entertaining. Whenever Margaret Rutherford is on screen, as the medium who starts and tries to control the trouble, the picture is wonderfully funny." In 1984, Leslie Halliwell wrote:

"Direction and acting carefully preserve a comedy which on its first West End appearance in 1941 achieved instant classic status. The repartee scarcely dates, and altogether this is a most polished job of film-making."

Critic Pauline Kael wrote, "Noel Coward wrote this flippant, ectoplasmic comedy in 1941 to provide some relief for war-torn London; it seemed pleasantly airy in stage productions at the time, but it sags more than a little in this arch David Lean version." Leonard Maltin gave the film three and a half of four stars: "Delicious adaptation of Noel Coward's comedy-fantasy ... Rutherford is wonderful as Madame Arcati ... " In the 21st century, Daniel Etherington of Channel 4 rated it three-and-a-half out of five stars and commented:

"Like a quintessentially English supernatural take on the contemporaneous American screwball comedy, Blithe Spirit is a joy, sharing with its US counterparts fast, witty dialogue that has its origins in stage performance. Although the theatricality arguably hampers the film ... the verve of the performances, in tandem with the striking Technicolor cinematography Oscar-winning special effects, elevates it ... Rutherford almost steals the show, playing the kind of charismatically eccentric grand dame that would define her career."

=== Accolades ===
Tom Howard won the 1947 Academy Award for Best Visual Effects. It was nominated for the Hugo Award for Best Dramatic Presentation but lost to The Picture of Dorian Gray.

== See also ==
- Blithe Spirit (2020 film)
- List of ghost films
