= Unheard Melodies: Narrative Film Music =

1987 book about film music

- Author: Claudia Gorbman
- Language: English
- Subject: Film music
- Publisher: Indiana University Press; British Film Institute
- Publication date: 1987
- Pages: 190
- ISBN: 978-0-253-20436-3
- OCLC: 15053054

Unheard Melodies: Narrative Film Music is a book by film scholar Claudia Gorbman, first published in 1987 by Indiana University Press and the British Film Institute. It explores the role of music in cinema and the history of its analysis, the latter engaging with the 1947 book Composing for the Films by Theodor W. Adorno and Hanns Eisler.

The book is notable for having introduced the terms "diegetic" and "non-diegetic" to describe the relationship between music and film narration, deriving from narrative theory.

== Overview ==
The book is divided into two parts: "Music in the Narrative Cinema", dealing with the history and content of film music analysis since the beginning of film, and "Three Analyses", a series of chapters examining the films Zero for Conduct, Under the Roofs of Paris and Hangover Square according to the framework of the first part.

== Reception ==
In a review written for Film Quarterly, Kathryn Kalinak characterized the book as "a ground-breaking work which provides an access point to the admittedly foreign terrain of film music for the film scholar/critic and establishes the standard for theoretical discourse in the field."

Reviewer Alan Durant summarised the work as follows: "Put at its simplest, the book explores 'why' film-soundtrack history happened as it did, by relating the historical development of soundtrack conventions to different kinds of argument about film music's function. [...] Unheard Melodies is undoubtedly the most useful available guide to film soundtrack: an enjoyable book to read and an indispensable aid to anyone working in the field."

== See also ==
- Film music
