= Dombey and Son (disambiguation) =

Dombey and Son is a novel by Charles Dickens.

Dombey and Son may also refer to:

- Dombey and Son (film), 1917 silent film
- Dombey and Son (1969 TV series)
- Dombey and Son (1983 TV series)
