= Michael Presser =

American theatre manager

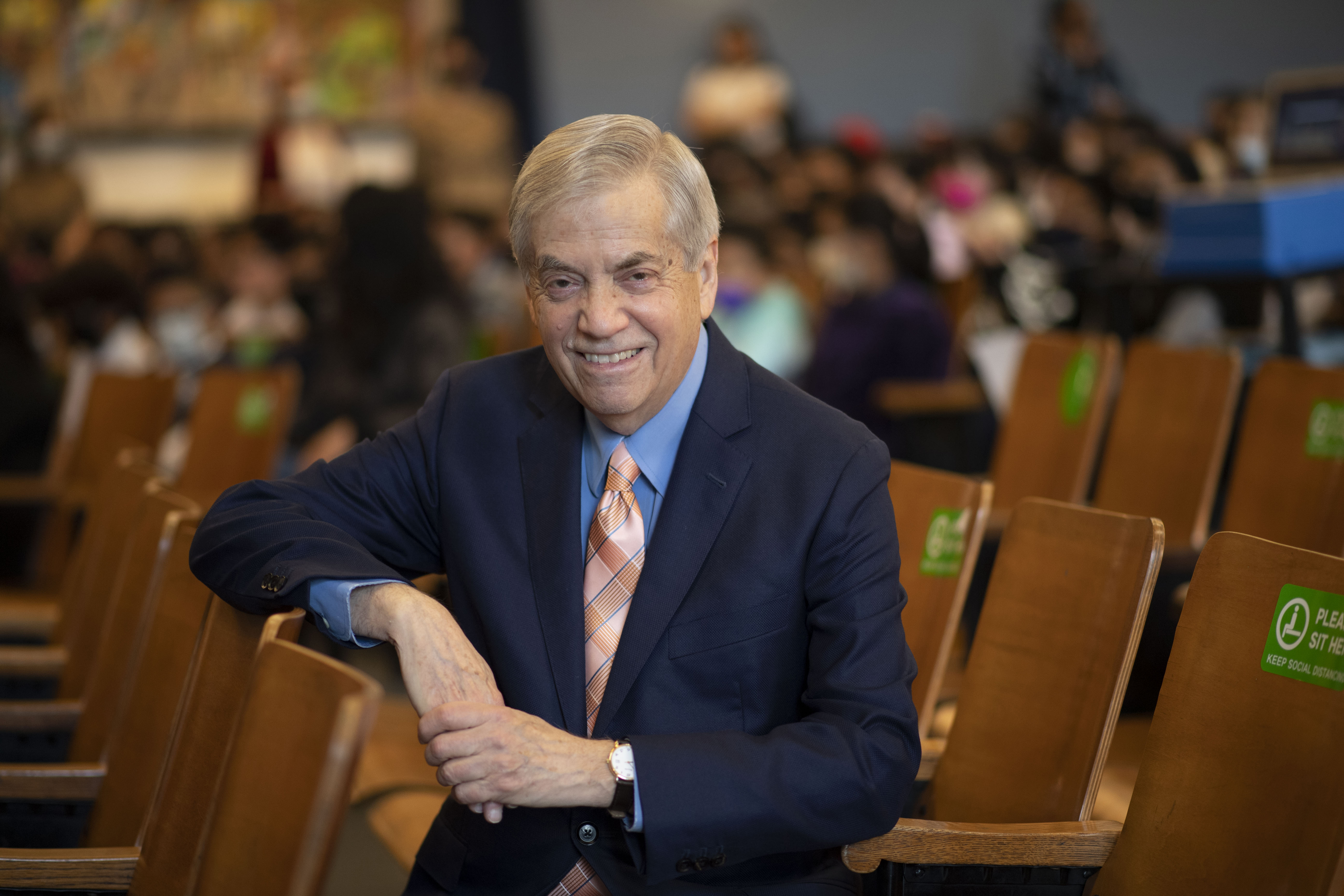
- Born: Philadelphia, PA, USA
- Education: Temple University
- Organization: Inside Broadway
- Known for: Founder of Inside Broadway

Michael Presser, born in Philadelphia, USA, is the founder and executive director of Inside Broadway, a New York City educational theatre company for young audiences. In 2022 he celebrated 40 years of Inside Broadway and his participation in the Broadway theatre community.

== Inside Broadway ==
Inside Broadway was founded by Presser in 1982, at the request of the late president of the Shubert Organization, Bernard B. Jacobs, to create a student ticket program for the Broadway musical Cats.

The company now develops touring musical productions and educational programs that allow students in New York to experience theatre firsthand and learn from performing arts professionals. Over 70,000 students in 90 schools in all five boroughs participate annually.

The repertory has included: Leonard Bernstein's On the Town, Duke Ellington's Sophisticated Ladies, George M. Cohan's My Town, Marlo Thomas' Free to Be... You and Me, Oscar Hammerstein's All Kinds of People, Irving Berlin's Land That I Love, Charles Strouse's Bye Bye Birdie, Gilbert and Sullivan's The Pirates of Penzance, Rodgers and Hammerstein's Cinderella, You're a Good Man, Charlie Brown, and The Gershwin's Real Magic.

Inside Broadway receives funding from several New York City and New York State Government agencies.

In 2010 Presser received Theater Resources Unlimited's Humanitarian Award for his work with Inside Broadway, and helping to introduce young people to the theatre. He has also received the 2005 Theatre Museum Award for arts education and the 1999 Encore Heart to Heart Community Service Award. The Broadway League has recognized his long service to the Broadway theatre industry.

== Theatre experience ==
After graduating from Temple University, Presser worked as an arts consultant for the Geneva Opera House in Switzerland Deutsche Oper am Rhein in Düsseldorf, The National Theatre in Prague, Czech Republic, Theater des Westens in Berlin, Theater Aachen and Gaudi Musicals, Cologne.

He has worked with such noted artists and attractions as Karl Richter, Carlos Montoya, Peter Nero as well as the Preservation Hall Jazz Band and the Munich Bach Choir.

== New York life ==
Presser has been active in New York City community affairs as a former member and chairman of the city's Community Board #5 in Midtown Manhattan for over 30 years.

He belongs to The Broadway League, The Broadway Association, The Producers League of Theatre for Young Audiences, Inc, The New York City Arts in Education Round Table, ART/New York, Opera America, and Theatre Communications Group.
