= Denham Film Studios =

British film studio

- Denham Film Studios, c. 1938
- Alternative names: London Film Studios; D&P Studios

General information
- Type: Film studios
- Architectural style: Art Deco
- Location: North Orbital Road, Denham, Buckinghamshire, United Kingdom
- Coordinates: 51.58670°N 0.49919°W
- Opened: 1936
- Closed: 1952
- Demolished: 1981
- Owner: Alexander Korda (1936-1939); Rank Organisation (1939-2006); MacAndrews & Forbes (2006-2014); Weston Homes (2014-Present)

Technical details
- Floor area: Main Building: 66,740 sqft

Design and construction
- Architect: Walter Gropius

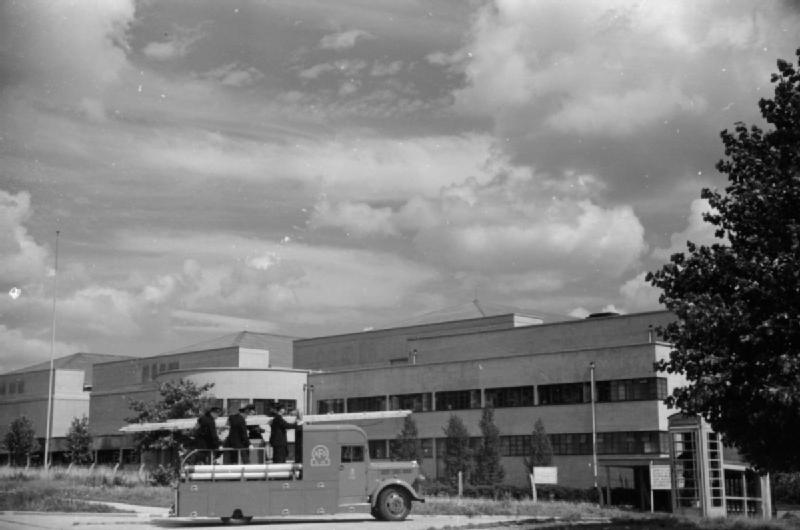
Denham Film Studios' entrance in 1941

Denham Film Studios was a British film production studio operating from 1936 to 1952, founded by Alexander Korda, in Buckinghamshire.

Notable films made at Denham include Brief Encounter and David Lean's Great Expectations. From the 1950s to the 1970s the studio became best known for recording film music, including the scores for Alfred Hitchcock's Vertigo, Chitty Chitty Bang Bang, and Star Wars.

The studio buildings were demolished in 1981 and the site re-landscaped as a business park; as of 2017 it has been turned over to residential use.

== History ==
The studios were founded by Alexander Korda in 1935, on a 165-acre (668,000 m^{2}) site known as 'The Fisheries' near the village of Denham, Buckinghamshire, and designed by architects Walter Gropius and Maxwell Fry. At the time it was the largest facility of its kind in the UK. In 1937, Queen Mary visited the studios while The Drum was being filmed. In 1946, 'Stage One Music Theatre' opened. Designed by sound recordist and engineer Cyril Crowhurst, the stage could accommodate 120 performers.

The studios were known by various names during their lifetime including London Film Studios, the home of Korda's London Films. It was merged with the Rank Organisation's Pinewood Studios to form D&P Studios; Pinewood is just four miles south of Denham. Filmmakers were said to prefer Denham as a studio, leading to Pinewood Studios being used for storage during the Second World War.

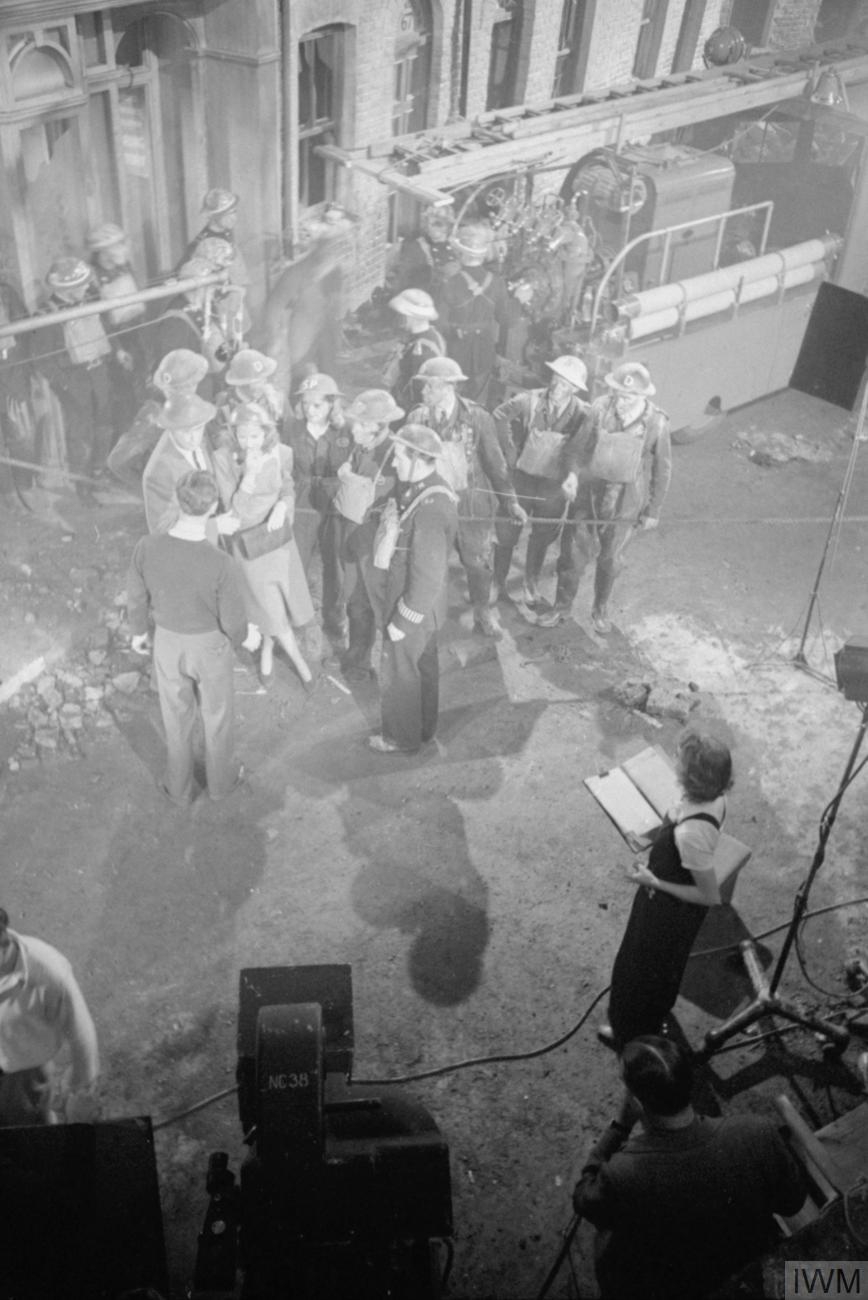
Harold French's Unpublished Story being filmed at Denham in 1941

Some of the notable films made at Denham include, The Thief of Bagdad, 49th Parallel, Brief Encounter, Great Expectations and Hamlet. Bernard Miles said that "when the technicians, the electricians and carpenters and so on, on the floor, who had been watching a scene filmed, applauded, you knew it was good, because they'd seen the best." Colin Sorensen, who as a schoolboy often watched the work going on at Denham recalled the sight "of the main studio buildings, a great mass of, probably asbestos, grey-green roofs" and the smell of "cellulose paint merged with newly cut soft wood." The proximity of Denham Aerodrome was sometimes difficult. Mary Morris remembered that an intimate scene with Leslie Howard, for Pimpernel Smith was "interrupted 22 times by aircraft noise."

Denham's final film was made in 1952, and the J. Arthur Rank Company went on to rent the facility to the United States Air Force between 1954 and December 1961. In the 1960s and 1970s Rank-Xerox occupied the Art Deco office buildings and used most of the sound stages as warehouses. Despite this, from the 1950s Denham became one of the most important centres for recording film music, the studio played host to Bernard Herrmann, John Barry, Jerry Goldsmith and John Williams, among others.

After the closing of the film studio, Stage One Music Theatre was used periodically by Pinewood Studios and Rank to record film scores, including for Vertigo, The Three Worlds of Gulliver and Mysterious Island. In 1966 the film production company Anvil Films moved into the large music stage at Denham. Led by Ken Cameron (brother of the famous journalist James), Ken Scrivener, Richard Warren and Ralph May, Anvil recorded post-synching dialogue, Foley sound effects and music. By 1969, the studio claimed it was the most technologically advanced recording studio in Europe. Important films recorded during their time at the studio, included Ryan's Daughter, Jane Eyre, International Velvet, Superman, Star Wars, the TV miniseries Jesus of Nazareth, Alien and The Empire Strikes Back. The company was forced to move in 1980 when the studio was bought by a developer.

The buildings on the south of the site were demolished in 1980 and the area redeveloped and landscaped as Broadwater Park business park. The landscaped gardens, by Preben Jakobsen and utilising spoil from the demolished buildings, are included on the Register of Historic Parks and Gardens. In 2017 the Grade II listed main studio building and surrounding land were redeveloped as luxury flats and houses. The Art Deco main building, which included a film processing laboratory and cinema, is the only surviving building from the original film studios.

== Selected films ==
Made on the site during construction:

- The Ghost Goes West (1935)
- Things to Come (1936)
- The Man Who Could Work Miracles (1936)

The first film to be made at the studio proper was Southern Roses (1936). Others included:

- Fire Over England (1936)
- Dark Journey (1936)
- Rembrandt (1936)
- I Claudius (1937) abandoned
- Knight Without Armour (1937)
- The Squeaker (1937)
- Farewell Again (1937)
- 21 Days (1937)
- A Yank at Oxford (1938)
- South Riding (1938)
- The Citadel (1938)
- The Divorce of Lady X (1938)
- Goodbye, Mr. Chips (1939)
- The Arsenal Stadium Mystery (1939)
- A Window in London (1939)
- The Stars Look Down (1939)
- Q Planes (1939) - released in the US as Clouds Over Europe
- Thief of Bagdad (1940) - mainly made at Denham.
- Dangerous Moonlight (1941), the film that inspired the term Denham Concerto, coined by Steve Race (after the Warsaw Concerto included in the film)
- Noël Coward's In Which We Serve (1942)
- Hatter's Castle (1942)
- The Gentle Sex (1943) - credits show D&P Studios.
- Powell & Pressburger's The Life and Death of Colonel Blimp (1943), A Canterbury Tale (1944), I Know Where I'm Going! (1945) and A Matter of Life and Death (1946)
- Laurence Olivier's Henry V (1944) and Hamlet (1948)
- Part of David Lean's Brief Encounter (1945)
- Most of Blithe Spirit (1945)
- Great Expectations (1946)
- Odd Man Out (1947)
- So Well Remembered (1947)
- Sleeping Car to Trieste (1948)
- So Evil My Love (1948)
- The History of Mr. Polly (1949)
- Treasure Island (1950)
- The Story of Robin Hood and His Merrie Men (1952)

The last film to be made at Denham was Disney's The Sword and the Rose (1953).
