= Rodney Ackland =

English dramatist (1908–1991)

Ackland photographed by Howard Coster, 1936

Rodney Ackland (18 May 1908 in Westcliff-on-Sea, Essex – 6 December 1991 in Richmond upon Thames, Surrey) was an English playwright, actor, theatre director and screenwriter.

Born as Norman Ackland Bernstein in Southend, Essex, to a Jewish father from Warsaw and a non-Jewish mother, he was educated at Balham Grammar School in London. In his 16th year, he made his first stage appearance at the Gate Theatre Studio, playing Medvedieff in Gorky's The Lower Depths and later studied acting at the Central School of Speech Training and Dramatic Art. He married Mab Lonsdale, daughter of the playwright Frederick Lonsdale, in 1952; she died in 1972.

== Theatre career ==
In 1929, after performing with various repertory companies, Ackland toured as Young Woodley in the play of that name. At the Gaiety Theatre in 1933 he played Paul in his own adaptation of Ballerina, which also toured the following year, and at the Criterion in 1936 he played the role of Oliver Nashwick in his own original play After October which transferred there from the Arts Theatre.

In 1941, he co-wrote the screenplay for the film Temptation Harbour starring Robert Newton and Simone Simon. Two musical collaborations came in 1942 with his version of Blossom Time starring Richard Tauber as Franz Schubert at the Lyric Theatre, and his London Coliseum production of the musical play, The Belle of New York. He also wrote and directed The Dark River at the Whitehall Theatre in 1943, starring Peggy Ashcroft. He joined Robert Newton as co-authors of Cupid and Mars (1945), and A Multitude of Sins (1951)

The first staging of his large-cast drama, The Pink Room (or The Escapists), in Brighton and then at the Lyric Hammersmith in London on 18 June 1952, was largely financed by Terence Rattigan, who liked the play and believed it deserved a London production. The Pink Room was a tragicomedy set in the summer of 1945 in a seedy London club (based on the French Club in Soho). It received a severe critical panning, and after that, apart from one further play and an adaptation, it led to the playwright's more than 30-year virtual absence. According to its director, Frith Banbury, "When the play failed, Terry never wanted to see Rodney again."

However, following the abolition of the Lord Chamberlain's play licensing in 1968, Ackland was able to rewrite aspects of this play, re-titling it Absolute Hell. It was performed in its new form in 1988 to considerable success at the Orange Tree Theatre, Richmond-upon-Thames, directed by Sam Walters and John Gardyne, and starring Polly Hemingway and David Rintoul.

In 1991, it was adapted and directed for BBC 2 by Anthony Page, starring Dame Judi Dench. The play was revived by Page at the National Theatre in 1995, again with Dench in the leading role. In 2018, the National staged another revival, directed by Joe Hill-Gibbins and starring Kate Fleetwood.

See also Nick Smurthwaite's theatre profile of Ackland for The Stage, Revival of a Realist, 5 February 2004

== Film career ==
Rodney Ackland's first contact with Alfred Hitchcock was as a supporting actor in The Skin Game (1931), a screen version of the John Galsworthy play. Hitchcock, however, recognised his potential as a screenwriter and collaborated with him on the second film adaptation of J Jefferson Farjeon's London fog-bound thriller Number Seventeen (1932) starring Leon M. Lion.

Ackland co-wrote the British film Bank Holiday (1938), contributed additional dialogue to Young Man's Fancy (1940), and made some uncredited contributions to Dangerous Moonlight (1941) and Love Story (1944). His screenplay for Hatter's Castle (1942), from the novel by A.J. Cronin, provided a rampant star role for Robert Newton as the megalomaniac Scottish hatter. He shared with Emeric Pressburger an Academy Award nomination for the screenplay of 49th Parallel (US: The Invaders, 1941), starring Raymond Massey and Eric Portman.

Ackland is credited with discovering the actress Sally Ann Howes, the child of neighbour Bobby Howes, when he insisted that she audition for his film Thursday's Child (1943), which he both wrote and directed.

He renewed his association with Pressburger with the two men co-writing the screenplay for the thriller Wanted for Murder (1946), mainly intended as a film vehicle for Eric Portman playing a man obsessed by his father's role as the public hangman. Around the same time, he made Temptation Harbour (1947), the first adaptation of Georges Simenon's novel Newhaven/Dieppe, directed by Lance Comfort, again with Robert Newton.

He twice collaborated with Rattigan as a screenwriter, on the Anthony Asquith film Uncensored (1942), starring Eric Portman; and for the Associated British production of Bond Street (1948), an anthology film consisting of four stories about a wedding trousseau. Neither Ackland nor Rattigan were credited on the latter film.

His final work for the cinema was on the screenplay for The Queen of Spades (1949), an adaptation of Alexander Pushkin's short story. Ackland intended to direct the film, but fell out with the producer Anatole de Grunwald and star Anton Walbrook. Thorold Dickinson took over at short notice and rewrote Ackland's script with the help of de Grunwald.

Assisted by a co-author Elspeth Grant, Ackland wrote his memoirs, The Celluloid Mistress, or The Custard Pie of Dr. Caligari, published by Alan Wingate in London in 1954.

== Plays ==
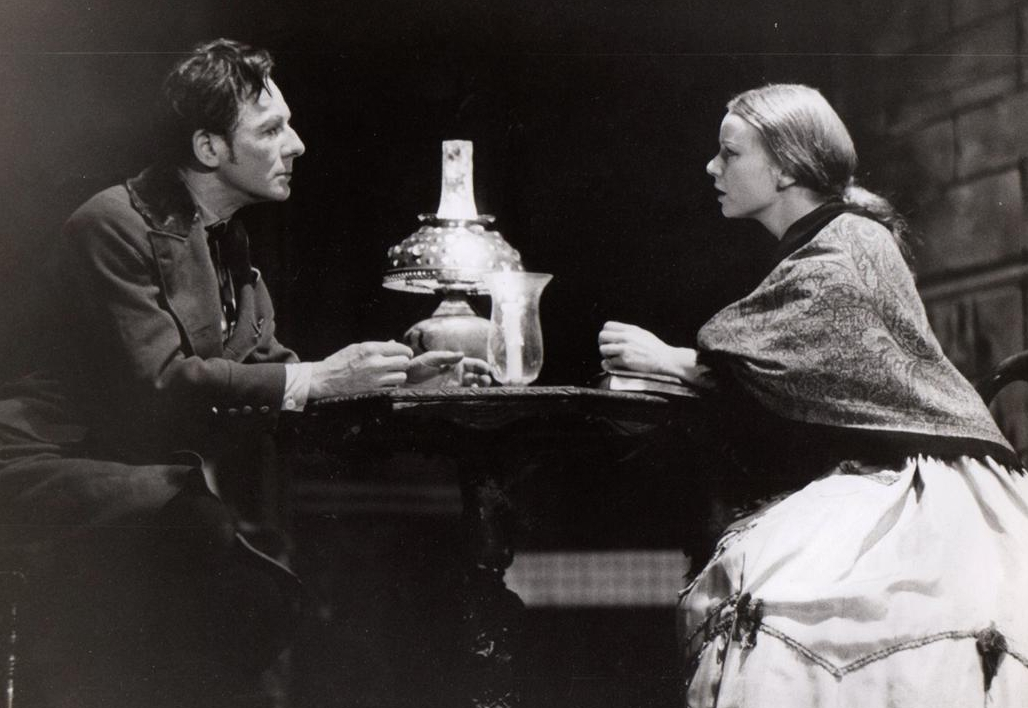
John Gielgud and Dolly Haas in the 1947 Broadway production of Ackland's stage dramatization of Crime and Punishment

- Improper People (1929)
- Marion Ella and Dance With No Music (1930)
- Strange Orchestra (1931)
- Ballerina, adapted from Eleanor Smith's novel (1933)
- Birthday (1934)
- The Old Ladies, adapted from Hugh Walpole's 1924 novel (1935)
- After October and Plot Twenty-One (1936)
- Yes, My Darling Daughter, an English version of the American comedy by Mark Reed (1937)
- The White Guard, adapted from the Russian of Mikhail Bulgakov (1938)
- Remembrance of Things Past (1938)
- Sixth Floor, an English version of the play by Alfred Gehri (1939)
- Blossom Time, with music by Franz Schubert (1942)
- The Dark River (1943)
- Crime and Punishment, adapted from Dostoevsky (1946)
- Diary of a Scoundrel or Too Clever By Half, adapted from Alexander Ostrovsky, (1948)
- Before the Party, adapted from the story by W. Somerset Maugham (1949)
- The Pink Room, or The Escapists (1945, first staged in 1952), rewritten as Absolute Hell (1987)
- A Dead Secret (1957)
- Farewell, Farewell Eugene, adapted from John Vari's original play (1959)

== Selected filmography ==
- Shadows (1931)
- Keep Smiling (1938)
- Under Your Hat (1940)
- An Englishman's Home (1940)

== Sources ==
- Who's Who in the Theatre 17th edition, Gale 1981, ISBN 0-8103-0235-7 (for Ackland's own authoritative CV)
- The Oxford Companion to English Literature, ed Margaret Drabble, OUP 1995 ISBN 0-19-866221-1
- The Oxford Companion to Twentieth-Century Literature in English, ed Jenny Stringer, OUP 1996 ISBN 0-19-212271-1
- Terence Rattigan, a Biography by Geoffrey Wansell, Fourth Estate 1995 ISBN 1-85702-201-7
- A Dictionary of Writers and Their Work by Michael Cox, OUP 2002 ISBN 0-19-866249-1
- The Macmillan International Film Encyclopedia by Ephraim Katz, Macmillan 1994 ISBN 0-333-61601-4
- Halliwell's Film, Video and DVD Guide, by John Walker, HarperCollins 2004 ISBN 0-00-719081-6
- Theatre Record (archived reviews of Absolute Hell 1988 and 1995)
- J. C. Trewin and Wendy Trewin The Arts Theatre, London, 1927-1981, 1986 ISBN 0-85430-041-4.
