= Inside Broadway =

Non-profit organization for children's theatre

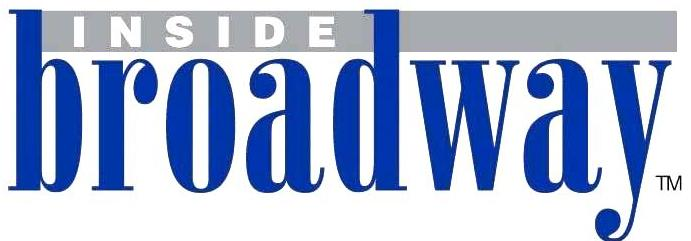
Logo for Inside Broadway

Inside Broadway is a non-profit performing arts education organization and children's theatre company based in Midtown Manhattan, New York.

== History ==
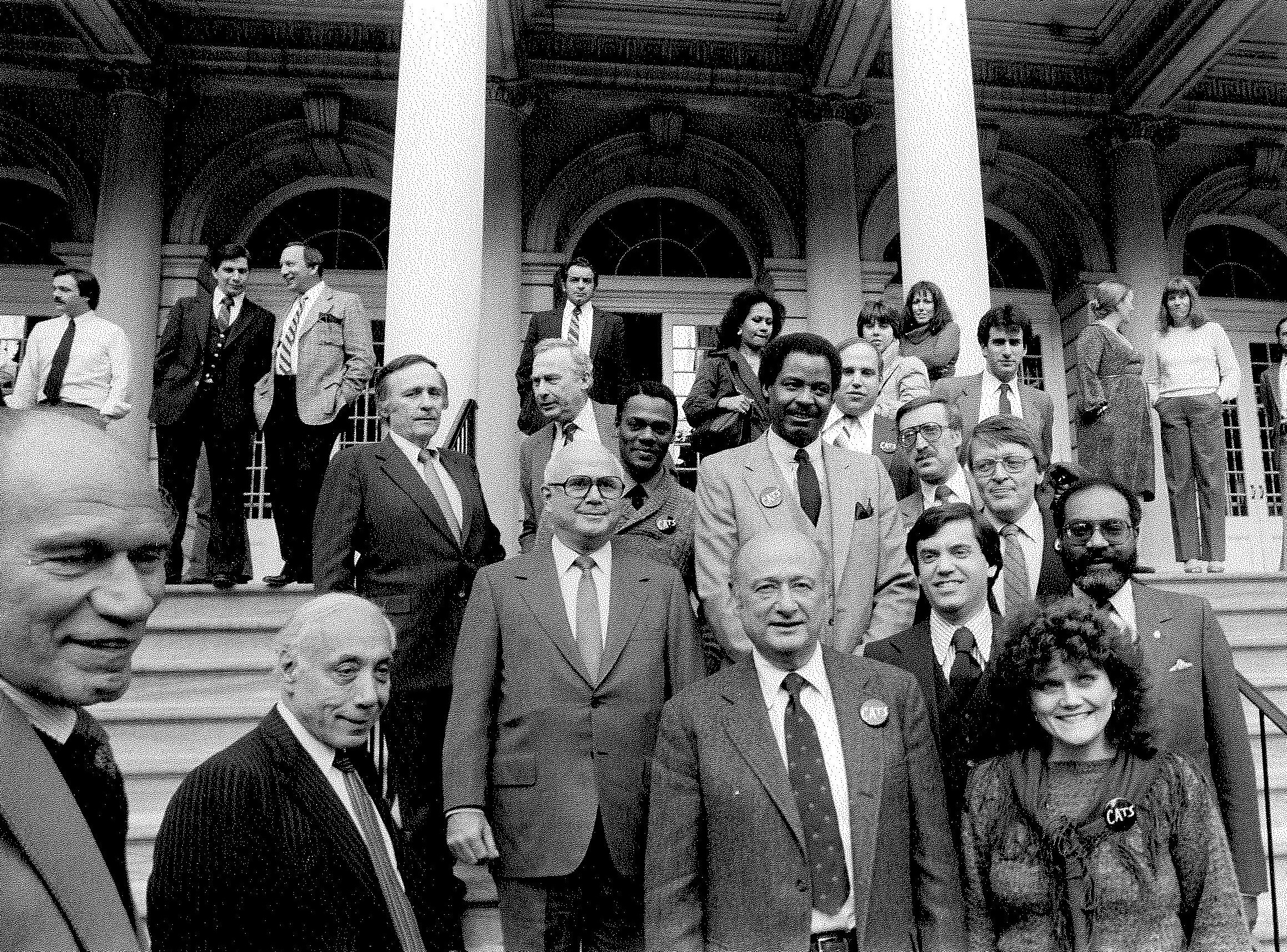
Announcement of the CATS ticket program at City Hall; November 8, 1982

Inside Broadway, originally known as Midtown Management Group, was founded in 1982 by Michael Presser. It began when Presser was asked by Bernard Jacobs, then-president of The Shubert Organization, to create a student ticket program for the Broadway production of Cats. This program distributed 50 tickets each Wednesday matinee to New York City public school students. A year later, the program expanded to include Dreamgirls. The program became very successful, eventually including shows such as Les Misérables, Phantom of the Opera, and Miss Saigon. The ticket program ran for the entire length of the original run of Cats, ending when the production closed in 2000.

Aside from the ticket program, Inside Broadway created several other projects during its first few years, including:

- Broadway Backstage, an educational video created with the cast and creative team of Cats to showcase the backstage workings of a Broadway production. In 1988, Presser brought this video to the Soviet Union and showed it to several groups of students.
- The Shakespeare Connection, a collaboration with the Royal Shakespeare Company in which teaching artists from the United Kingdom came over to lead Shakespearean workshops for New York students.
- The Cats Funbook, an educational guide to the show written for students attending as part of the ticket program. Copies of this guide were later distributed by several Cats touring companies.
- A production of the children's opera Brundibar, which was performed by a group of students at a school in Queens, with an additional performance at Hofstra University.

After the end of the ticket program, Inside Broadway changed its focus to providing in-school and after-school programs.

== Programs ==
=== Creating the Magic ===
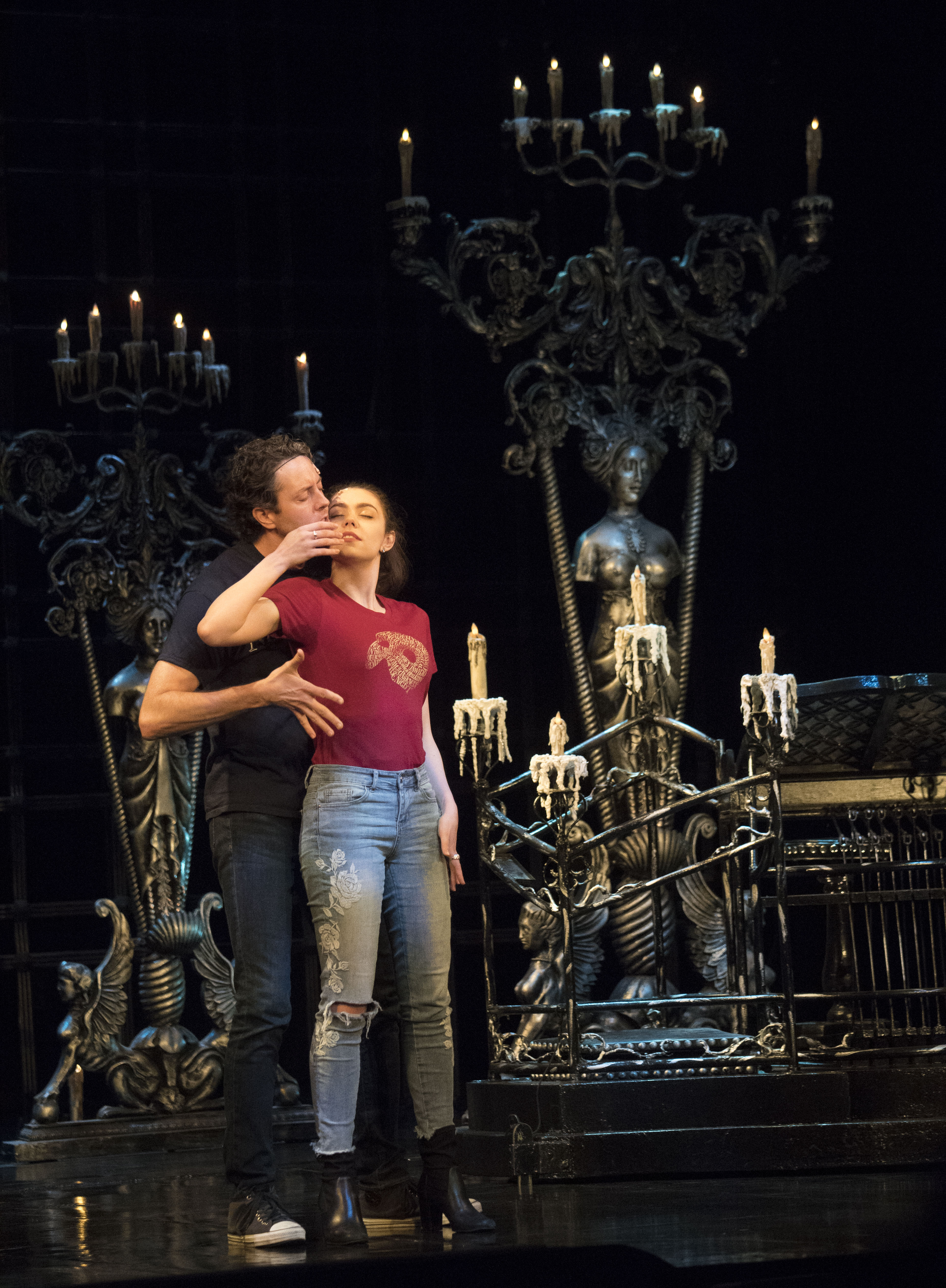
Creating the Magic with The Phantom of the Opera, 2018

Inside Broadway's Creating the Magic programs are collaborations with Broadway productions to create presentations for New York City public school students about the inner workings of a Broadway show. Taking place inside the Broadway theatre where the show is playing, these presentations consist of performances from the actors and demonstrations from the stage crew with the set, props, lighting, and sound design. The goal of these programs is to educate students about the various different careers present in the theatre industry, as well as to highlight the contributions that behind-the-scenes workers make to a Broadway show. Each presentation is put on twice that day, and up to 2,200 students per day attend the program.

Broadway productions who have participated in a Creating the Magic program include:

- Chicago
- Beetlejuice
- King Kong
- Dear Evan Hansen
- Be More Chill
- The Band's Visit
- The Phantom of the Opera
- Finding Neverland
- Cats
- Mamma Mia!
- Wicked
- Les Misérables

=== Touring productions ===
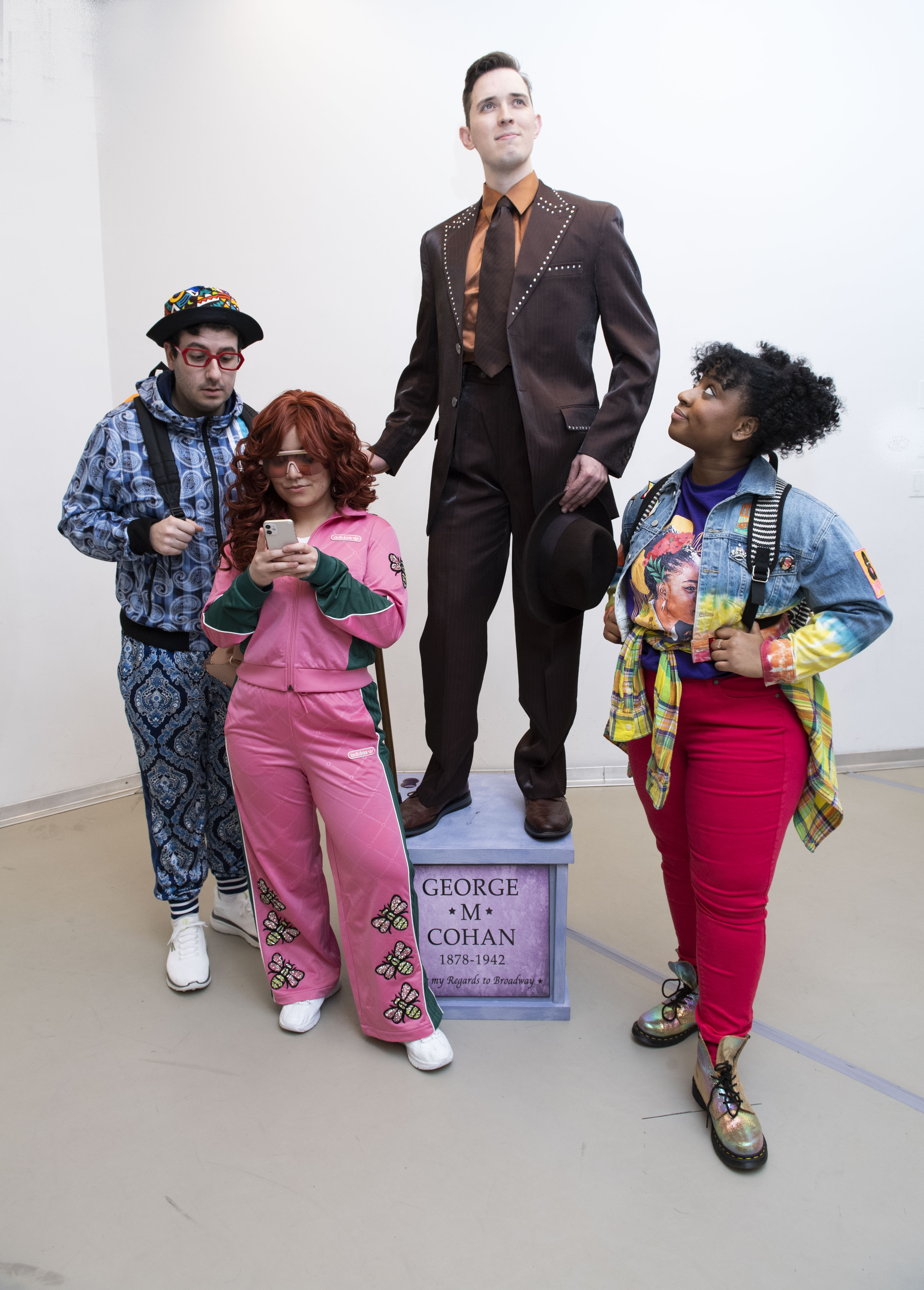
George M. Cohan's My Town, 2022

Twice a school year, Inside Broadway tours an abridged adaptation of a Broadway musical to schools in all five boroughs of New York City. These productions are fully staged and use Equity actors. Each show is adapted to a 45-minute version, meant to fit into a typical class period length. The goal of these tours is to bring live theatre to students in areas where the performing arts are often inaccessible.

Productions have included:

- All Kinds of People, an original show written by Inside Broadway using the music of Oscar Hammerstein II (1996, 1997, 1999, 2020)
- Land that I Love, an original piece developed by Inside Broadway and the family of Irving Berlin, using Berlin's music (1996, 1999, 2002, 2017)
- Free to Be... You and Me by Marlo Thomas (1999, 2000)
- Sophisticated Ladies by Duke Ellington and Donald McKayle (2000, 2010, 2016, 2023)
- Smokey Joe's Cafe by Jerry Leiber and Mike Stoller (2002, 2003, 2009)
- You're a Good Man, Charlie Brown by Clark Gesner and Andrew Lippa (2003, 2004, 2008, 2018)
- Kiss Me, Kate by Bella and Samuel Spewack and Cole Porter (2004)
- Pirates of Penzance by Gilbert and Sullivan (2004)
- Cinderella by Rodgers and Hammerstein (2005, 2006)
- On the Town by Betty Comden, Adolph Green, and Leonard Bernstein (2005)
- The Gershwins' Real Magic, developed by Inside Broadway using the music of George and Ira Gershwin (2018)
- My Town, an original piece developed by Inside Broadway using the music of George M. Cohan (2022)

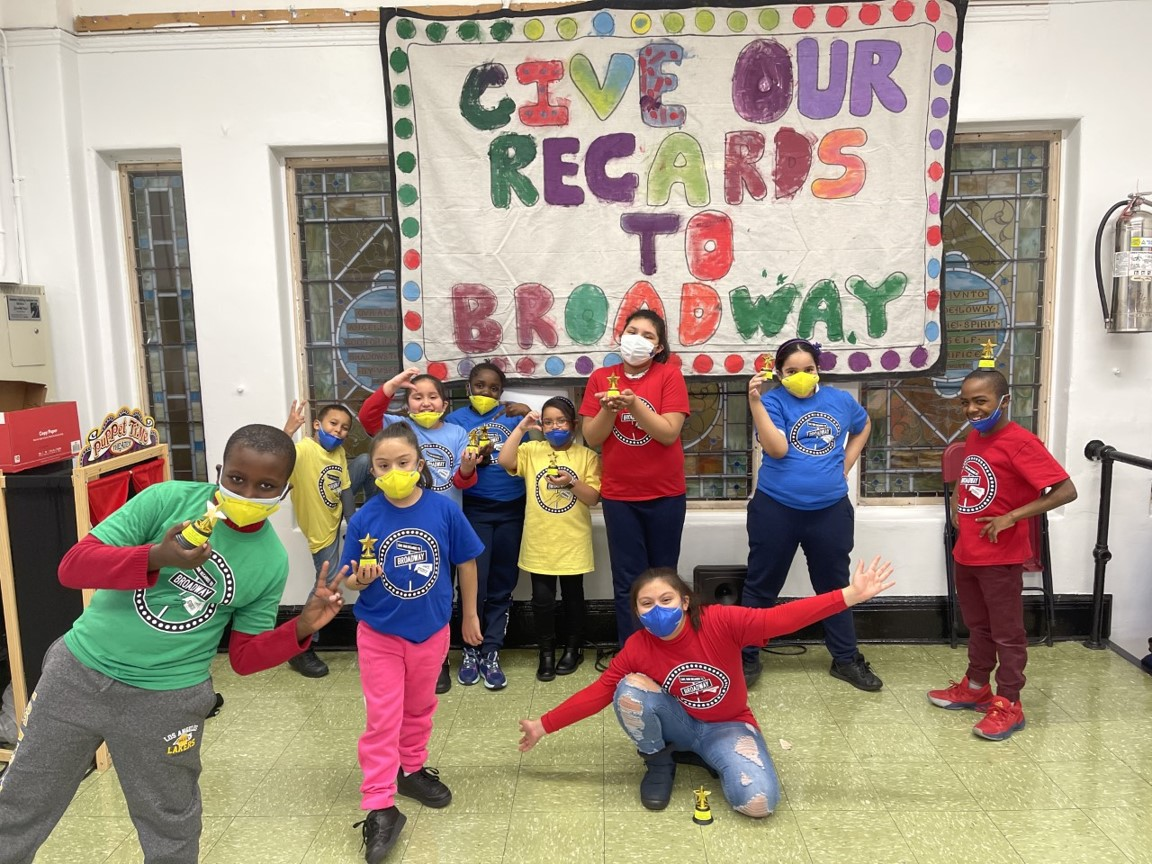
Participants of Build-a-Musical

=== Teaching Artist residencies ===
Inside Broadway works with up to 100 schools each year to develop educational theatre programs tailored to each school. Each program is taught through a several-week-long residency by teaching artists, professional actors who oftentimes have Broadway experience. The most popular of these programs is the "Build-a-Musical" program, in which groups of students work with the teaching artist to develop a musical revue that will later be performed for their school. These programs are designed to develop communication and teamwork skills while also increasing cultural awareness and appreciation for musical theatre.

Aside from in-school programming, Inside Broadway also offers after-school programs (CASA), in which students rehearse a pre-written revue of popular Broadway songs, and special programs for senior citizen centers (SU-CASA).

== Broadway Beacon Awards ==
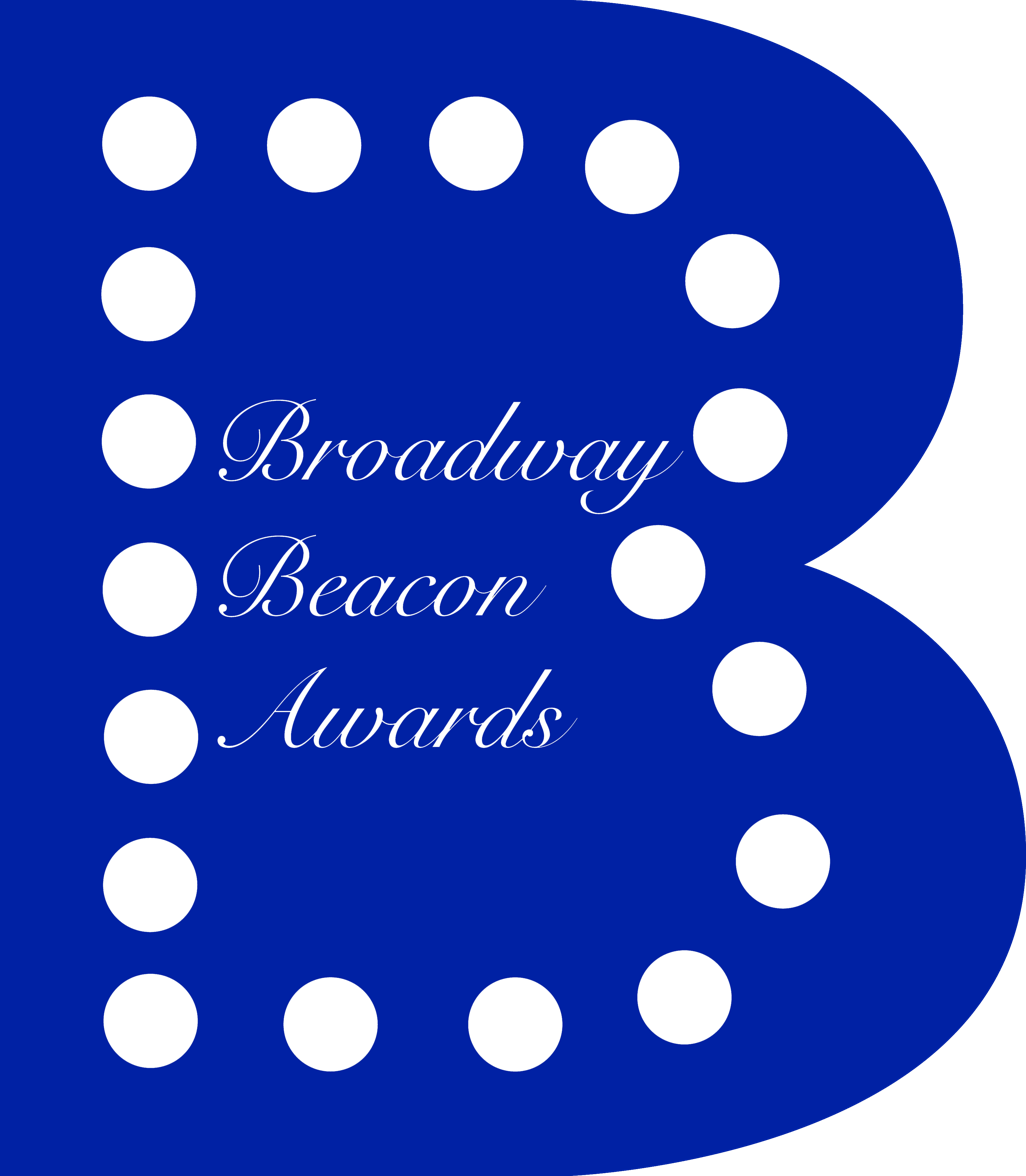
Broadway Beacon Awards logo

The Broadway Beacon Awards is an annual event held by Inside Broadway to honor artists and community leaders in the Broadway industry. At the awards ceremony, there are also performances from students who participate in Inside Broadway programs and from individual Broadway performers or casts of Broadway shows.

The first Broadway Beacon Award was given to Broadway actress Carol Channing in 1995. Other honorees in recent years have included Chita Rivera in 2019 (specifically the recipient of a Lifetime Achievement Award), Ramin Karimloo in 2017, and Renée Fleming in 2015

== Supporters ==
Inside Broadway receives annual funding from the following New York City and State government agencies:

- New York City Department of Education
- New York City Department of Cultural Affairs
- New York City Department of Youth and Community Development
- New York City Department for the Aging
- New York State Department of Parks, Recreation and Historic Preservation
- New York City Council
