= Warsaw Concerto =

Programme music by Richard Addinsell

The Warsaw Concerto is a short work for piano and orchestra by Richard Addinsell, written for the 1941 British film Dangerous Moonlight, which is about the Polish struggle against the 1939 invasion by Nazi Germany. In performance it normally lasts just under ten minutes. The concerto is an example of programme music, representing both the struggle for Warsaw and the romance of the leading characters in the film. It became very popular in Britain during World War II.

However, referring to the entire ten minute composition as the complete 'Warsaw Concerto' is a misnomer, because in the film for which it was written, the protagonist and love interest, Carole Peters, scans the programme for the evening's concert and the camera pauses on the three movement orchestral work entitled 'Warsaw Concerto' -- and then stops completely on the tempo marking for the third movement ('ALLEGRO MODERATO. PRESTO'). The special effects team then highlights this phrase, throwing the rest of the screen in shadow so that the cinema audience gets the implied message that it is only this third movement that is to be subsequently heard in the film. The film's story line would have been bogged down if all three movements of a piano concerto had been presented to the cinema viewer, so Richard Addinsell only had to compose the final movement of a fictitious complete 'Warsaw Concerto'.

The concerto is written in imitation of the style of Sergei Rachmaninoff. It initiated a trend for similar short piano concertos in the Romantic style, which have been dubbed "tabloid concerto", or Denham Concerto (the latter term coined by Steve Race).

== Background ==
The composer, Richard Addinsell, was born in London and initially studied law before turning to a career in music. His time at the Royal College of Music was brief, as he was soon drawn to musical theatre. He also wrote for radio, but his most memorable contributions are to a series of film scores beginning in 1936: he wrote the music for the 1939 film Goodbye, Mr. Chips, the original Gaslight (released in 1940, not to be confused with the later Hollywood version), Scrooge, and Dangerous Moonlight (1941, also released in the US as Suicide Squadron). It is this last picture that began the trend of "tabloid concertos," classical-style compositions written for performance in movies. John Huntley explores the reason behind this concept:

The associations which individual members of the audience may have in relation to a certain piece of well-known music are quite beyond the control of the director of a film in which it is used…. And so with Dangerous Moonlight it was rightly decided to have a piece of music specially written, that could be used to become associated in the mind of the audience with Poland, air raids in Warsaw, and whatever the director wanted to suggest.

The concerto was not part of the original plan. According to Roy Douglas, at that time orchestrator for all of Addinsell's scores: "The film's director had originally wanted to use Sergei Rachmaninoff's Second Piano Concerto, but this idea was either forbidden by the copyright owners or was far too expensive". Thus Addinsell wanted the piece to sound as much like Rachmaninoff as possible, and Douglas remembers, "while I was orchestrating the Warsaw Concerto I had around me the miniature scores of the Second and Third Piano Concertos, as well as the Rhapsody on a Theme of Paganini." Although it is at the heart of Dangerous Moonlight, the Concerto is never performed complete but rather revealed piecemeal. The opening of the work is heard when the two protagonists meet, and it is further developed when they are on their honeymoon. Finally, in the only extended concert sequence, we are given the closing section but its use is not restricted to scenes with the "composer" at the piano. The themes are found as underscoring throughout the film, and in this way a brief concert piece gains a dramatic resonance that belies its small scale.

== Role in the film ==
Dangerous Moonlight takes place at the start of World War II and tells the story of a Polish concert pianist and composer, Stefan Radecki (Anton Walbrook) who defends his country by becoming a fighter pilot. After an air raid in Warsaw by German Luftwaffe, he is discovered by an American reporter, Carol Peters (Sally Gray), practising the piano in a bombed-out building. It is the opening of his Warsaw Concerto, at this point a work in progress, and the first line he says to her is, "It is not safe to be out alone when the moon is so bright" (referring to the moonlight bombing raids). Gazing intently at Carol and disclosing "something lovely you've just given me", he introduces the lyrical second theme of the Concerto; this melody is thus always associated with Carol. Like Rachmaninoff, Addinsell introduces it almost as a nocturne. Stefan speaks of the piece later in the film: "This music is you and me. It's the story of the two of us in Warsaw, of us in America, of us in … where else I don't know. That's why I can't finish it". However, he does finish it. Similar to the way that Rachmaninoff returns to his second theme in his Second Piano Concerto, the "Carol" melody is used, not only to bind together the emotional strands of the drama, but to bring the Concerto to a triumphant conclusion. Throughout the film, the unfinished piece is defined in a relationship with Frédéric Chopin's "Military" Polonaise, symbolising Polish patriotism. It is "completed" when the Polonaise elements are integrated with the Romantic theme, implying the fusion of romantic and patriotic love.

Within the context of its story, Dangerous Moonlight is also effective in creating the impression of a larger work written and performed by the film's fictional composer and pianist. When snatches of the Concerto are first played, one character tells another, "I've got the records", and when the "premiere" is shown, we are provided with a close-up of the program, Warsaw Concerto, with three movements listed. Only one movement was actually written by Addinsell.

== Popularity ==
The success of the film led to an immediate demand for the work, and a recording was dutifully supplied from the film's soundtrack (at nine minutes, it fit perfectly on two sides of a 12-inch disk playing at 78 rpm) along with sheet music for a piano solo version. Such unexpected success had another consequence. The off-screen piano part was played by Louis Kentner, a British musician known for his performances of Franz Liszt, but he had insisted that there be no on-screen credit, for fear that his participation in a popular entertainment would harm his classical reputation. He lost his qualms when the recording sold in the millions, and Douglas notes that he even asked for royalties (they were granted). Ultimately, the Warsaw Concerto was such a hit that it made the then unusual journey from movie screen to concert hall.

In his 19 February 1944 appearance on Desert Island Discs, Guy Gibson, leader of the Dambusters raid, asked for it as his first choice.

One commentator has suggested that the Warsaw Concerto is the most significant instrumental work written in Britain during the war, still conjuring up a time and place better than any other piece.

== Arrangements, adaptations, quotes and samples ==
- Percy Grainger transcribed and recomposed the work for two pianos in the 1940s.
- In an interview, the conductor Diego Masson recalled that the French modernist composer and conductor, and leader of the post-war avant-garde, Pierre Boulez was, in his youth, house pianist at the Folies Bergère Club in Paris "playing the Warsaw Concerto, engulfed in kitsch and lit by pinkish light – and that was while he was writing his second sonata"
- Don "Creesh" Hornsby included a version of the Concerto in his comedy act, often performed suspended by his heels, in the late 1940s.
- The theme of the Concerto is borrowed in a popular-music love song whose lyrics include "The world outside will never know..." recorded by The Four Coins in 1958. The Concerto theme charted at number 18 on the UK Singles chart in January 1959, as "The World Outside" by Ronnie Hilton, a very popular singer in the UK. It was also recorded by The Four Aces.
- Pianist Liberace featured the Warsaw Concerto regularly on stage and on his 1952 album, "Liberace, Super Hits"
- In 1999 US Rapper DMX sampled the Concerto on the single "What's my name", which was the first release from his US number 1 album ...And Then There Was X
- George Greeley recorded the Concerto on both his 1957 Warner Bros. album The World's Ten Greatest Popular Piano Concertos, and his 1963 album A Classic Affair.
- José Carreras recorded the Concerto as the opening track on his 1999 album Pure Passion
- Gonzalo Rubalcaba, the Grammy Award-winning Cuban jazz pianist and composer, recorded a Latin arrangement of the Warsaw Concerto in 2005
- A live version of the Concerto, featuring Richard Carpenter on the piano, was included on the Carpenters' album Live at the Palladium, clocking in at 6'35".
- Richard Clayderman recorded an arrangement for the piece with the Royal Philharmonic Orchestra for his album The Classic Touch, which was released in 1985
- The music was used in the film, The Sea Wolves (1980), with Addinsell's themes arranged by Roy Budd. For the film, Budd added lyrics by Leslie Bricusse to his arrangement of the music, the resulting song being entitled The Precious Moments, sung by Matt Monro.
- New Orleans R&B pianist James Booker recorded the opening section of the work. It appears on his album Classified: Remixed and Expanded, issued by Rounder Records in 2013.
- The theme of the Concerto is the principal theme of the radio program "La música de los clásicos (The Music of the Classics), produced by the dominican tenor Arístides Incháustegui, in the radio transmitter "Raíces" in The Dominican Republic.

== Other pop culture references ==
- British composer Clive Richardson composed London Fantasia as a sequel to the Warsaw Concerto in 1944. The work had gained success during that time and appeared in both Piano-Orchestra and Piano solo version with the word description 'A musical picture of The Battle of Britain'.
- Spike Milligan repeatedly refers to the piece in his autobiography [[]] (1971) and in the subsequent books in the series as 'the bloody awful Warsaw Concerto'. Spike says in the first book that he was often asked to play it when he was playing in a jazz band for dances, to which his reply was "What - on a trumpet?".
- The Concerto is frequently used in championship figure skating (especially in Japan).
- The composer and presenter Steve Race coined the term Denham Concerto for short romantic film pieces inspired by the success of the Warsaw Concerto, such as Hubert Bath's Cornish Rhapsody, Nino Rota's Legend of the Glass Mountain and Charles Williams' The Dream of Olwen, after the Denham Film Studios.
- Real Rachmaninoff (the slow movement from the Second Piano Concerto) was used to great effect in the 1945 film Brief Encounter, and also in The Seventh Veil (also 1945).

== See also ==
- Film Orchestration
