= Steve Race (musician) =

British musician and presenter (1921–2009)

Steve Race OBE
- Born: Stephen Russell Race; 1 April 1921; Lincoln, England
- Died: 22 June 2009 (aged 88); Great Missenden, England
- Occupations: Radio personality, pianist, composer
- Spouse(s): Marjorie Leng (m. 1944; died 1969) Léonie Mather (m. 1970)
- Children: 1

Stephen Russell Race (1 April 1921 – 22 June 2009) was an English composer, pianist and radio and television presenter.

== Early life ==
He was born in Lincoln, Lincolnshire, the son of a lawyer, Russell Race, who died in 1926. Race learned the piano from the age of five. He was educated (1932–37) at Lincoln School, where he formed his first jazz group, which included a young Neville Marriner, later a major figure in the world of classical music. At sixteen, he attended the Royal Academy of Music, studying composition under Harry Farjeon and William Alwyn.

His brother Philip, a solicitor, was a Methodist preacher, and worked with the British Council of Churches, from 1990 known as Churches Together in Britain and Ireland.

== Career ==
After leaving the academy, Race (encouraged by the classical music critic of the News Chronicle, Scott Goddard) wrote occasional dance band reviews for Melody Maker and, in 1939, joined the Harry Leader dance band as pianist, succeeding Norrie Paramor.

Race joined the Royal Air Force in 1941, and formed a jazz/dance quintet. After the Second World War, he began a long and productive career with the BBC, where his ready wit, musicianship and broad musical knowledge made him much sought after as a musical accompanist for panel games and magazine shows, such as Whirligig and Many a Slip.

At the same time he was playing in the bands of Lew Stone and Cyril Stapleton, and arranging material for Ted Heath. In, 1949 The Steve Race Bop Group recorded some of the first British bebop records for the Paxton label. These included four sides with Leon Calvert, Johnny Dankworth, Peter Chilver, Norman Burns (drums), Jack Fulton (bass) and Race on piano, and four more (with the addition of saxophonist Freddy Gardner) as the Bosworth Modern Jazz Group on the Bosworth label. He also developed a sideline arranging player piano rolls for the Artona company.

From the 1950s to the 1980s, he presented numerous music programmes on radio and television. Additionally, in 1955, he was appointed the first Light Music Advisor to the independent television company Associated-Rediffusion. He is probably best known as the chairman of the long-running light-hearted radio and TV panel game My Music which ran from 1967 to 1994. He presented and wrote most of the questions for all 520 episodes broadcast. He also presented Jazz For Moderns on radio and Jazz 625 on television for the BBC in the 1960s. Away from music, for two years from 1970 Race co-presented (with William Hardcastle) the BBC Radio 4 "drive-time" news magazine PM. On Friday 11 April 1964, he hosted the Home Service Any Questions?, when Freddy Grisewood was recuperating.

Race coined the term Denham Concerto for short romantic film pieces inspired by the success of Richard Addinsell's Warsaw Concerto, such as Hubert Bath's Cornish Rhapsody, Nino Rota's Legend of the Glass Mountain and Charles Williams' The Dream of Olwen, after the Denham Film Studios where many of them were made.

== Composer ==
As a composer, he produced a number of pieces in the jazz, classical and popular idioms. The bebop jazz piece Blue Acara (named after one of the many tropical fish he and his wife collected) was arranged for jazz band or for full orchestra and recorded by Harry Parry. It is likely that the composer of light Latin American dance tunes known as "Esteban Cera" was Race hiding behind a pseudonym. Faraway Music, the theme to an ITV Play of the Week in 1961, was issued as a single by Steve Race and his Orchestra. Others followed, including one of his better-known compositions, the short instrumental piece Nicola (named after his daughter), which won an Ivor Novello Award in 1962. The 'b' side of the 1962 single featured another instrumental, Ring Ding. The follow-up single Pied Piper (The Beeje) reached No. 29 in the UK Singles Chart in March 1963. In the mid-1970s this piece was played as Queen's Park Rangers ran onto the pitch at the start of each home game at Loftus Road. Steve Race was a season ticket holder at the club.

Race wrote (and with the Steve Race Orchestra performed) library music for the Chappell Recorded Music Library, an example being Pacemaker. But his best-known and, according to his autobiography, his most lucrative composition is his music for the Birds Eye frozen peas jingle, "Sweet as the moment when the pod went pop". Race also wrote the acoustic guitar jingle which introduced programmes made by Southern Television in the 1970s and early 1980s.

In the film Calling Paul Temple (1948) Race (with Sid Colin) wrote two of the songs performed by Celia Lipton, and appeared himself as the pianist/bandleader in the nightclub section. He also wrote the score for the 1962 British B-movie crime film Crosstrap, and the scores for Three Roads to Rome (1963), Against the Tide (1965) and Land of Three Rivers (1966).

Windsor Blues, a duet written in 1970 for Prince Charles (cello) and the Earl of Chester (trumpet) has been recorded. (The two titles refer to the same person, and the cello part was intended to be tape recorded by Charles).

== Personal life ==
Race's autobiography, Musician at Large, was published in 1979, and in 1988 Souvenir Press Ltd published his book about his grandfather's short but interesting life, from lead miner to missionary, entitled The Two Worlds of Joseph Race.

Race married Marjorie Leng in 1944 and they had a daughter, Nicola. Marjorie died from cancer in 1969. He married again in 1970, to radio producer Léonie Mather, who survived him. Race had his first heart attack in 1965. He died of the second attack at his home in Great Missenden, Buckinghamshire, in June 2009.

In the 1980s he was a supporter of the Social Democratic Party.

== Publications ==
- Piano-Style: A Complete Guide for the Modern Dance Band Pianist (sheet music, 1949)
- Musician at Large (autobiography, 1979), ISBN 0413397408)
- The King's Singers: A Self Portrait by Race, Nigel Perrin and The King's Singers (1980, ISBN 086051109X)
- My Music (1980, ISBN 0140052062)
- Dear Music Lover (1981)
- Music Quiz (1983, ISBN 0297782924)
- The Two Worlds of Joseph Race (1988). This is a biography of Joseph Russell Race, his paternal grandfather, who was a Wesleyan Methodist missionary in China, and colleague of David Hill.
