= The Frightened Lady (1932 film) =

1932 film

- Trade advertisement
- Directed by: T. Hayes Hunter
- Written by: Angus MacPhail; Bryan Edgar Wallace; Edgar Wallace (play)
- Produced by: Michael Balcon
- Starring: Emlyn Williams; Cathleen Nesbitt; Gordon Harker; Belle Chrystall
- Production company: Gainsborough Pictures
- Distributed by: British Lion Film Corporation
- Release date: March 1932 (UK)
- Running time: 87 minutes
- Country: United Kingdom
- Language: English

The Frightened Lady (U.S. title: Criminal at Large) is a 1932 British thriller film directed by T. Hayes Hunter and starring Emlyn Williams, Cathleen Nesbitt, Norman McKinnel and Belle Chrystall. It was written by Angus MacPhail and Bryan Edgar Wallace, adapted from Edgar Wallace's 1931 play The Case of the Frightened Lady, which was later filmed as The Case of the Frightened Lady (1940).

== Preservation status ==
The British Film Institute National Archive holds a collection of stills but no film or video materials.

== Plot ==
A young woman goes to stay at the house of Lord Lebanon, but two murders in quick succession lead to the arrival of detectives and cause the woman to fear for her life.

== Cast ==
- Emlyn Williams as Lord Lebanon
- Cathleen Nesbitt as Lady Lebanon
- Norman McKinnel as Chief Inspector Tanner
- Gordon Harker as Sergeant Totty
- Belle Chrystall as Aisla Crane
- Cyril Raymond as Sergeant Ferraby
- Finlay Currie as Brooks
- Percy Parsons as Gilder
- Julian Royce as Kelver

== Reception ==
Emlyn William's performance was voted best in a British film for 1932.

Film Weekly wrote: "After looking like comedy thriller, with more comedy than thrills, for fully three-quarters of its length, The Frightened Lady suddenly and quite naturally arrives at a tensely gripping climax. ... Strongly individual performances by a fine cast give the film added distinction. Emlyn Williams, a newcomer to the screen, is particularly good as young Lord Lebanon."

Kine Weekly wrote: "A slick, smooth-running mystery play, cleverly adapted from Edgar Wallace's stage success. All the author's narrative skill and amazing sense of character-drawing and stagecraft are retained, and suspense is built up in a manner which never allows the picture to lose its grip on its audience. Humour, too, plays an important part in the development, and perfect balance completes entertainment which is certain to appeal to al ciasses. "

The New York Times found it "considerably more diverting on the stage than it is on the screen... It is a rugged shocker, and when it was not stripped of some of its good scenes it kept the spectator guessing... It is, however, a talented performance that Mr. Williams gives. Cathleen Nesbit does very well as the somewhat sinister dowager Lady Lebanon and Norman McKinnel, although handicapped by the direction, lends a certain distinction to the rôle of Tanner."
