= Richard Addinsell =

English composer (1904–1977)

- Addinsell in 1949.
- Born: 13 January 1904; Woburn Square London, England
- Died: 14 November 1977 (aged 73); Chelsea, London
- Education: Hertford College, Oxford; Royal College of Music, London.

Richard Stewart Addinsell (13 January 1904 – 14 November 1977) was an English composer, known early in his career for his music for the theatre in collaboration with Clemence Dane, and later for his film music. This included his best-known piece, the Warsaw Concerto, composed for the 1941 film Dangerous Moonlight. He was subsequently known for his musical collaboration with the lyricist and performer Joyce Grenfell.

== Life and career ==
=== Early years ===
Richard Addinsell was born in Woburn Square, London, on 13 January 1904, the younger son of William Arthur Addinsell, who was a chartered accountant, and his wife, Annie Beatrice née Richards. Addinsell was educated at home before attending Hertford College, Oxford, to study law but going down after 18 months. He became interested in music as an alternative career. In 1925 he enrolled at the Royal College of Music (RCM) but lasted only two terms before leaving, again without obtaining any formal qualification.

While still a student at the RCM, Addinsell (billed as Dick, rather than Richard) was contributing the music for a revue, The Charlot Show of 1926, with Noel Gay. A revue for Fred Karno followed in 1927, again with Gay.

In 1928 Addinsell first collaborated with the author Clemence Dane. The work was Adam's Opera, described by the two collaborators as "a tragic pantomime, set to music and written in nursery rhyme". It was presented at The Old Vic in December 1928. The critics were equivocal about Dane's text, but Addinsell's music was described by several as "catchy", and the theatrical newspaper The Era called it "By far the best part of the entertainment":

The composer has gone to the old nursery tunes for inspiration, and his scoring is particularly good. Some of the touches of jazz in the latter half were exceedingly clever, for they were in themselyes a cynical background to Miss Dane's lines.

In 1929 Addinsell completed his informal education by touring Europe to visit major theatrical and musical centres, such as Berlin and Vienna. He wrote the music for J. B. Priestley and Edward Knoblock's 1931 stage adaptation of Priestley's 1929 novel The Good Companions, in which John Gielgud played a young musician, composer of the music actually provided by Addinsell.

=== 1932 to 1939 ===
In 1932 Addinsell wrote the incidental music for a Broadway conflation of Alice in Wonderland and Through the Looking Glass by Eva Le Gallienne, starring Josephine Hutchinson. His music was praised, but the meagre orchestral forces at the composer's disposal prompted Burns Mantle to call for the score to "be elaborated and orchestrated for a full-sized band", when sections of it would be more impressive. The following year, also for New York, Addinsell composed the music for another "play in words and music" with Dane – Come of Age – which opened at the Maxine Elliott Theatre in January 1934 with Judith Anderson in the lead.

Dane then wrote Moonlight is Silver for which Addinsell composed the music. The piece opened in the West End in September 1934, starring Gertrude Lawrence and Douglas Fairbanks Jr.; Lawrence and Fairbanks recorded a scene from the play for His Master's Voice, with Addinsell's music included in the background throughout, until at the end, Lawrence sings his setting of the title song. Next, Dane adapted Edmond Rostand's play L'Aiglon for Le Gallienne; it opened at the Broadhurst Theatre in New York in November 1934, with music by Addinsell. By 1934 Addinsell was well enough known for the BBC to devote a whole programme to his music.

Addinsell's last theatre compositions of the 1930s were The Happy Hypocrite (1936, Dane's dramatisation of Max Beerbohm's short story of the same name) and incidental music for a 1938 production of The Taming of the Shrew starring Edith Evans and Leslie Banks at the New Theatre. His association with the cinema began in 1936, although he had been in Hollywood in 1933 in connection with a planned film starring Francis Lederer, but the film was never made. Addinsell's introduction to writing for films came in 1936 when his contacts with Fairbanks (who starred) and Dane (co-author) led to his being invited to compose the music for The Amateur Gentleman.

During the rest of the 1930s, Addinsell provided film music for Fire Over England (1937), Farewell Again (1937), Vessel of Wrath (1938), South Riding (1938), The Lion Has Wings (1939) and Goodbye Mr Chips (1939).

=== 1940s ===
Addinsell's first film score of the 1940s was for Gaslight, a 1940 adaptation of Patrick Hamilton's 1938 stage play Gas Light. That year, and in 1941, he wrote the music for The Saviours, a sequence of radio plays by Dane, and when Priestley revived his Good Companions characters for a radio play in 1941, Addinsell wrote and played the music.

For the 1941 film Dangerous Moonlight the producers wanted a short romantic concertante piece for the hero to be seen and heard playing. Over a period of six months Addinsell worked out a pastiche lasting nine minutes, giving the effect of a concert pianist playing a concerto in the romantic style, such as that of Sergei Rachmaninoff. As was common practice for film composers, he wrote the piano score and delegated the task of orchestration to an assistant, in this case Roy Douglas. The result, which came to be known as the Warsaw Concerto was duly recorded by Louis Kentner and the London Symphony Orchestra and edited into the finished film. The work is not, in strictly musical terms, a concerto, but this nine-minute piece for piano and orchestra immediately took the public's fancy and rapidly became a concert hall success and a best-seller on record. Three million copies of the recording were sold, making Addinsell a rich man. There have been more than a hundred different recordings of the work and by the start of the twenty-first century more than five million copies had been sold. The Polish government-in-exile in London awarded Addinsell the Silver Cross of Merit for outstanding service to Poland in the field of music.

Between Dangerous Moonlight and a brief return to the theatre, Addinsell composed four more film scores: The Big Blockade (1941), Love on the Dole (1941), This England (1941) and The Day Will Dawn (1942). A chance meeting with Joyce Grenfell in 1942 resulted in a close friendship and numerous collaborations on songs, some of which initially appeared in West End revues, such as Tuppence Coloured (1947) and Penny Plain (1951), and then became a core part of her one-woman shows. They include "Hymn", "I'm Going to See You Today", "London Scottish", "Oh, Mr du Maurier", "Old Tyme Dancing (Stately as a Galleon)", "Picture-Postcard", "The Woman on the Bus", and "Time. In 1943 Addinsell again worked on a theatrical production with Dane – her adaptation of both the Lewis Carroll "Alice" books into a single play, produced in the West End with a cast headed by Sybil Thorndyke as the ferocious Queen of Hearts and the flustered White Queen.

Returning to film music, in 1945 Addinsell produced what some consider his finest film score for David Lean's adaptation of Noël Coward's play Blithe Spirit. An unsigned contemporary review called Addinsell "without doubt one of our most interesting young composers" and added, "In Blithe Spirit Richard Addinsell composed music for a piece, every line of which bears the stamp of Noël Coward's wit – and the music matched it perfectly". The composer's last three film scores of the 1940s were A Diary for Timothy (1946), The Passionate Friends (1948) and Under Capricorn (1949).

=== 1950s and later years ===
During the 1950s, Addinsell wrote the music for nine films: The Black Rose (1950), Highly Dangerous (1950), Scrooge (1951), Tom Brown's Schooldays (1951), Sea Devils (1953), Beau Brummel (1954), The Prince and the Showgirl (1957), The Admirable Crichton (1957), A Tale of Two Cities (1958).

Addinsell wrote the short orchestral piece Southern Rhapsody, which was played every morning at the start of TV broadcasts by the former Southern Television company in the south of England from 1958 to 1981.

As was common with film music until the 1950s, many of Addinsell's scores were destroyed by the studios as it was assumed there would be no further interest in them. However, recordings of his film music have been issued since his death, often reconstructed by the musicologist and composer Philip Lane from the soundtracks of the films themselves and conducted by Kenneth Alwyn or Rumon Gamba.

Orchestral works composed (or adapted) for the concert hall include The Invitation Waltz (1950), the Smokey Mountains Concerto (1950) and The Isle of Apples (1965).

== Personal life ==
Addinsell retired in the 1960s. He was, for many years, the partner of the fashion designer Victor Stiebel, who died in 1976.

Addinsell died on 14 November 1977 at his flat in Cheyne Walk, Chelsea, aged 73. His cremation took place at Golders Green Crematorium on 18 November 1977.

== Film credits ==
- His Lordship (1932)
- The Amateur Gentleman (1936)
- Fire Over England (1937)
- Dark Journey (1937)
- Farewell Again (1937)
- South Riding (1938)
- Vessel of Wrath (1938)
- Goodbye Mr. Chips (1939)
- The Lion Has Wings (1940)
- Men of the Lightship (1940; documentary)
- Britain at Bay (1940; documentary)
- Contraband (1940)
- Gaslight (1940)
- W.R.N.S. (1941)
- Old Bill and Son (1941)
- Dangerous Moonlight (1941; containing the Warsaw Concerto)
- This England (1941)
- Love on the Dole (1941)
- This Is Colour (1942; documentary)
- The Big Blockade (1942)
- The Day Will Dawn (1942)
- The Siege of Tobruk (1942; documentary)
- Troop Ship (1942; documentary—music for song Hold your hats on)
- The New Lot (1943)
- We Sail at Midnight (1943; documentary)
- A Diary for Timothy (1945; documentary)
- Blithe Spirit (1945)
- Soldier Sailor (1945; documentary—music for song I'm going to see you today)
- The Passionate Friends (1949)
- Under Capricorn (1949)
- The Black Rose (1950)
- Highly Dangerous (1950)
- Scrooge (1951)
- Tom Brown's Schooldays (1951)
- Encore (1951)
- The Secret Cave (1953)
- Sea Devils (1953)
- Beau Brummell (1954)
- Out of the Clouds (1955)
- The Prince and the Showgirl (1957)
- The Admirable Crichton (1957; uncredited)
- A Tale of Two Cities (1958)
- The Greengage Summer (1961)
- The Roman Spring of Mrs. Stone (1961)
- Waltz of the Toreadors (1962)
- The War Lover (1962)
- Life at the Top (1965)

Note: The source for the television and film appearances is the British Film Institute.
