= Dangerous Moonlight =

1941 British film by Brian Desmond Hurst

- American Theatrical Release Poster (Suicide Squadron)
- Directed by: Brian Desmond Hurst
- Written by: Terence Young (original story and screenplay); Rodney Ackland and Brian Desmond Hurst (contributing writers, uncredited)
- Produced by: William Sistrom
- Starring: Anton Walbrook; Sally Gray; John Laurie; Guy Middleton; Cecil Parker; Alan Keith; Derrick De Marney
- Cinematography: Georges Périnal
- Edited by: Alan Jaggs
- Music by: Richard Addinsell
- Distributed by: RKO Radio British Productions
- Release date: 26 June 1941 (UK)
- Running time: 94 minutes
- Country: United Kingdom
- Language: English

Dangerous Moonlight (U.S. title: Suicide Squadron) is a 1941 British musical film directed by Brian Desmond Hurst and starring Anton Walbrook. The film is perhaps best known for its score, written by Richard Addinsell and orchestrated by Roy Douglas, that includes the Warsaw Concerto. The gowns in the film were designed by Cecil Beaton.

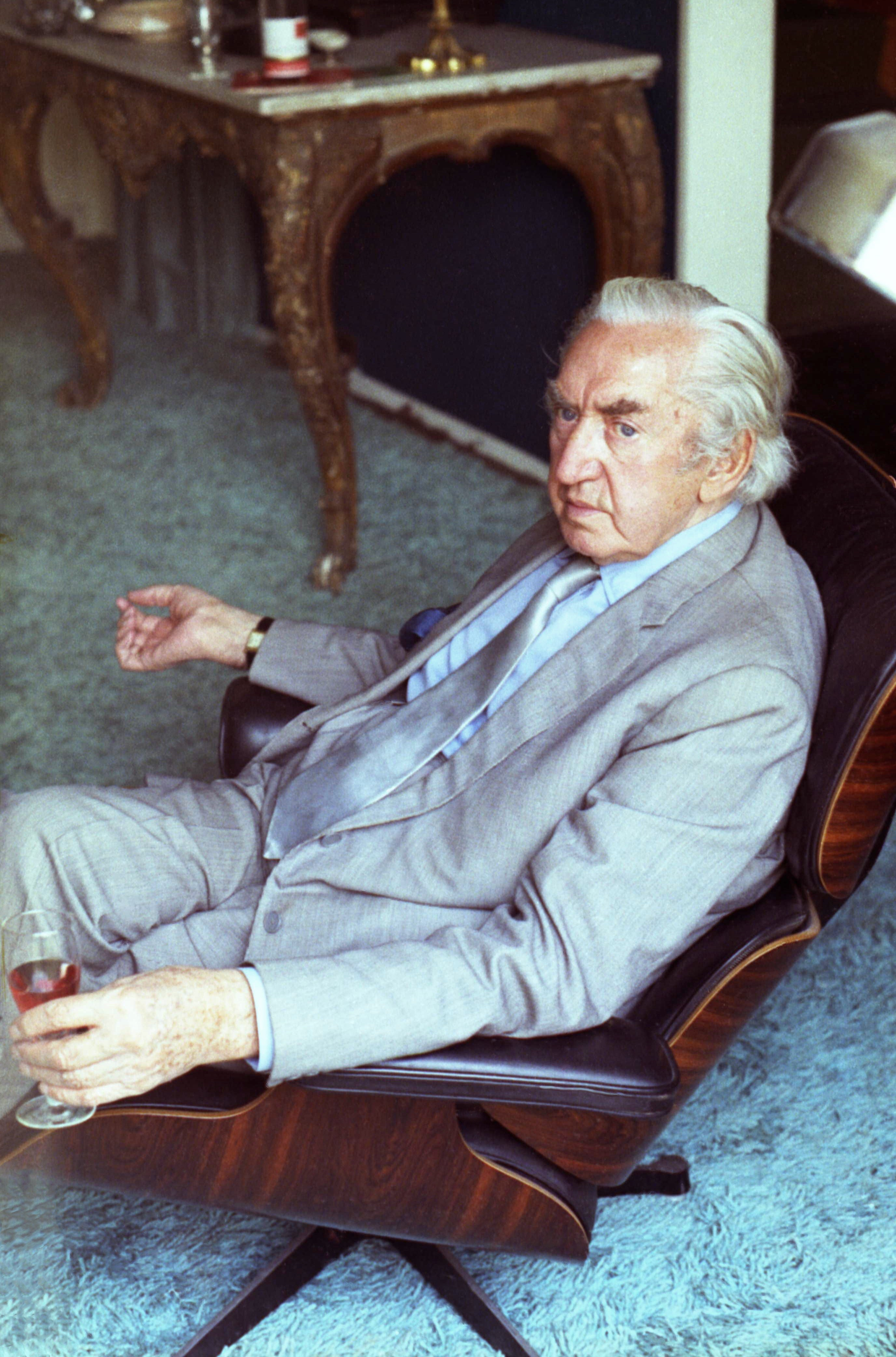
Brian Hurst, director of Dangerous Moonlight, in 1976 (portrait by Allan Warren)

Dangerous Moonlight's love-story plot, told mainly in flashbacks, involves the fictional composer of the Warsaw Concerto, a Polish piano virtuoso and shellshocked fighter pilot, who meets an American war correspondent in Warsaw and later returns from the United States to join the RAF in England in the war against the Germans, who have occupied Poland.

== Plot ==
During the German invasion of Poland, Polish airman and piano virtuoso Stefan Radetzky meets American reporter Carole Peters. He volunteers to fly a suicide mission but is not selected. Radetzky is among the last to escape Warsaw and months later, in New York, he and Carole reunite and marry.

In England, Radetzky performs a public concert and reveals that he has returned to fight, volunteering to fly as a pilot in a Polish squadron, although Carole fears that he will be killed. His final mission ends in self-sacrifice when he crashes into a German aircraft. He is badly injured in the crash and suffers from amnesia.

Later, Radetzky is in a London hospital recovering from his injuries. He begins to remember his past, recalling composing the Warsaw Concerto and first meeting his wife. Sitting at the piano, Radetzky sees Carole and says, "Carole, it's not safe to go out with you when the moon is so bright," repeating the first words that he had ever spoken to her.

== Cast ==
- Anton Walbrook as Stefan Radetzky
- Sally Gray as Carole Peters
- Derrick De Marney as Mike Carroll
- Cecil Parker as Specialist
- Percy Parsons as Bill Peters
- Keneth Kent as De Guise
- J. H. Roberts as Physician
- Guy Middleton as Shorty
- John Laurie as British commander
- Frederick Valk as Polish commander
- O. B. Clarence as Peters Family butler
- James Perrie
- Marion Spencer
- Lesley Gordon
- Philip Friend as Pete
- Tommy Duggan
- Bob Beatty as Mac - Reporter
- Conway Palmer
- Gordon Glennon
- Cynthia Heppner
- Alan Keith
- Michael Rennie as Kapulski
- Charles Farrell as First cab driver
- Kay Lewis
- Kent Stevenson
- William Taylor

== Production ==
Dangerous Moonlight was produced by the British unit of RKO, which financed it.

Although Anton Walbrook was an accomplished amateur pianist, the soundtrack music was played by professional pianist Louis Kentner, who was initially uncredited. Kentner believed that playing film music would not help his career, but he changed his mind upon seeing the film's success.

Aerial scenes were filmed in actual combat and feature the No 74 Squadron (squadron lettering "ZP") Supermarine Spitfire fighters that flew in the Battle of Britain.

Walbrook was not pleased with his performance and considered the film his least favourite.

== Reception ==
Released as Dangerous Moonlight and distributed by RKO Radio British, the film was a box-office success in the UK, although contemporary reviews were generally unfavourable.

When released in the United States, the film was renamed Suicide Squadron in a shortened 83-minute version that was distributed by Republic Pictures under lease. The New York Times review described the film as principally "a sentimental fable in which the excellent Anton Walbrook, so eloquent as the Hutterite leader in The Invaders, and Sally Gray make a listless and anemic pair of lovers. Derrick De Marney does much better by the roguish character of an Irish daredevil. None of them has lifted the film above the level of a hackneyed fiction." Variety noted that the sound quality was noticeably poor, especially in early scenes, although the aerial sequences, however, were particularly effective.

Among modern appraisals, Leonard Maltin has commented that Dangerous Moonlight is an "intelligently presented account of concert pianist who becomes a member of a British fighter squadron during WW2; musical interludes (including Richard Addinsell's well-known Warsaw Concerto) well handled. Look for Michael Rennie in a small role." A 2016 book about Hurst's films dedicates a section to Dangerous Moonlight. (Note: Theirs is the Glory: Arnhem, Hurst and Conflict on Film takes Hurst's Battle of Arnhem epic as its centrepiece and then chronicles Hurst's life and experiences during the First World War and profiles each of his other nine films on conflict, including Dangerous Moonlight.)

The Warsaw Concerto, composed by Richard Addinsell, became one of the most popular classical pieces of the period.
