= List of Academy Award–nominated films =

This is a list of Academy Award–nominated films.

== Statistics ==
As of March 16, 2026:

- Total number of awards ceremonies: 98
- Total number of nominated films: 5,241
- Total number of nominations given to films: 10,776
- Total number of Oscars awarded: 2,239 (57 honorary and 2,182 competitive)

== Films ==
If a film won the Academy Award for Best Picture its entry is listed in a shaded background with a boldface title.

Competitive Academy Awards are separated from non-competitive Awards; as such, any films that were awarded a non-competitive award will be shown in brackets next to the number of competitive wins. Films that were nominated, but had the nomination taken away for any reason are listed here, but without counting the nomination.

indicates Best Picture winner.

Film List
| Film | Released | Ceremony | Awards | Nominations |
|---|---|---|---|---|
| **Wings** | 1927 | 1st | 2 | 2 |
| 7th Heaven | 1927 | 1st | 3 | 5 |
| Sunrise: A Song of Two Humans | 1927 | 1st | 3 | 4 |
| The Last Command | 1928 | 1st | 1 | 2 |
| Street Angel | 1928 | 1st / 2nd | 1 | 3 |
| Tempest | 1928 | 1st | 1 | 1 |
| The Dove | 1927 | 1st | 1 | 1 |
| The Way of All Flesh | 1927 | 1st | 1 | 1 |
| Two Arabian Knights | 1927 | 1st | 1 | 1 |
| Underworld | 1927 | 1st | 1 | 1 |
| Sadie Thompson | 1928 | 1st | 0 | 2 |
| The Crowd | 1928 | 1st | 0 | 2 |
| A Ship Comes In | 1928 | 1st | 0 | 1 |
| Chang: A Drama of the Wilderness | 1927 | 1st | 0 | 1 |
| Glorious Betsy | 1928 | 1st | 0 | 1 |
| Sorrell and Son | 1927 | 1st | 0 | 1 |
| Speedy | 1928 | 1st | 0 | 1 |
| The Devil Dancer | 1927 | 1st | 0 | 1 |
| The Jazz Singer | 1927 | 1st | 0 (1) | 1 |
| The Magic Flame | 1927 | 1st | 0 | 1 |
| The Noose | 1928 | 1st | 0 | 1 |
| The Patent Leather Kid | 1927 | 1st | 0 | 1 |
| The Private Life of Helen of Troy | 1927 | 1st | 0 | 1 |
| The Racket | 1928 | 1st | 0 | 1 |
| The Circus | 1928 | 1st | 0 (1) | 0 |
| **The Broadway Melody** | 1929 | 2nd | 1 | 3 |
| In Old Arizona | 1928 | 2nd | 1 | 5 |
| The Patriot | 1928 | 2nd | 1 | 5 |
| The Divine Lady | 1929 | 2nd | 1 | 3 |
| Coquette | 1929 | 2nd | 1 | 1 |
| The Bridge of San Luis Rey | 1929 | 2nd | 1 | 1 |
| White Shadows in the South Seas | 1928 | 2nd | 1 | 1 |
| Alibi | 1929 | 2nd | 0 | 3 |
| Madame X | 1929 | 2nd | 0 | 2 |
| Our Dancing Daughters | 1928 | 2nd | 0 | 2 |
| The Valiant | 1929 | 2nd | 0 | 2 |
| 4 Devils | 1928 | 2nd | 0 | 1 |
| A Woman of Affairs | 1928 | 2nd | 0 | 1 |
| Drag | 1929 | 2nd | 0 | 1 |
| Dynamite | 1929 | 2nd | 0 | 1 |
| Sal of Singapore | 1928 | 2nd | 0 | 1 |
| Skyscraper | 1928 | 2nd | 0 | 1 |
| The Awakening | 1928 | 2nd | 0 | 1 |
| The Barker | 1928 | 2nd | 0 | 1 |
| The Cop | 1928 | 2nd | 0 | 1 |
| The Hollywood Revue of 1929 | 1929 | 2nd | 0 | 1 |
| The Last of Mrs. Cheyney | 1929 | 2nd | 0 | 1 |
| The Leatherneck | 1929 | 2nd | 0 | 1 |
| The Letter | 1929 | 2nd | 0 | 1 |
| Thunderbolt | 1929 | 2nd | 0 | 1 |
| Weary River | 1929 | 2nd | 0 | 1 |
| Wonder of Women | 1929 | 2nd | 0 | 1 |
| **All Quiet on the Western Front** | 1930 | 3rd | 2 | 4 |
| The Big House | 1930 | 3rd | 2 | 4 |
| The Divorcee | 1930 | 3rd | 1 | 4 |
| Disraeli | 1929 | 3rd | 1 | 3 |
| King of Jazz | 1930 | 3rd | 1 | 1 |
| With Byrd at the South Pole | 1930 | 3rd | 1 | 1 |
| The Love Parade | 1929 | 3rd | 0 | 6 |
| Anna Christie | 1930 | 3rd | 0 | 3 |
| Bulldog Drummond | 1929 | 3rd | 0 | 2 |
| Romance | 1930 | 3rd | 0 | 2 |
| Condemned | 1929 | 3rd | 0 | 1 |
| Hallelujah | 1929 | 3rd | 0 | 1 |
| Hell's Angels | 1930 | 3rd | 0 | 1 |
| Raffles | 1930 | 3rd | 0 | 1 |
| Sally | 1929 | 3rd | 0 | 1 |
| Sarah and Son | 1930 | 3rd | 0 | 1 |
| Song of the Flame | 1930 | 3rd | 0 | 1 |
| Street of Chance | 1930 | 3rd | 0 | 1 |
| The Big Pond | 1930 | 3rd | 0 | 1 |
| The Case of Sergeant Grischa | 1930 | 3rd | 0 | 1 |
| The Devil's Holiday | 1930 | 3rd | 0 | 1 |
| The Green Goddess | 1930 | 3rd | 0 | 1 |
| The Rogue Song | 1930 | 3rd | 0 | 1 |
| The Trespasser | 1929 | 3rd | 0 | 1 |
| The Vagabond King | 1930 | 3rd | 0 | 1 |
| Their Own Desire | 1929 | 3rd | 0 | 1 |
| **Cimarron** | 1931 | 4th | 3 | 7 |
| Skippy | 1931 | 4th | 1 | 4 |
| A Free Soul | 1931 | 4th | 1 | 3 |
| Min and Bill | 1930 | 4th | 1 | 1 |
| Tabu: A Story of the South Seas | 1931 | 4th | 1 | 1 |
| The Dawn Patrol | 1930 | 4th | 1 | 1 |
| Morocco | 1930 | 4th | 0 | 4 |
| The Front Page | 1931 | 4th | 0 | 3 |
| Holiday | 1930 | 4th | 0 | 2 |
| Svengali | 1931 | 4th | 0 | 2 |
| East Lynne | 1931 | 4th | 0 | 1 |
| Just Imagine | 1930 | 4th | 0 | 1 |
| Laughter | 1930 | 4th | 0 | 1 |
| Little Caesar | 1931 | 4th | 0 | 1 |
| Smart Money | 1931 | 4th | 0 | 1 |
| The Criminal Code | 1931 | 4th | 0 | 1 |
| The Doorway to Hell | 1930 | 4th | 0 | 1 |
| The Public Enemy | 1931 | 4th | 0 | 1 |
| The Right to Love | 1930 | 4th | 0 | 1 |
| The Royal Family of Broadway | 1930 | 4th | 0 | 1 |
| Trader Horn | 1931 | 4th | 0 | 1 |
| Whoopee! | 1930 | 4th | 0 | 1 |
| **Grand Hotel** | 1932 | 5th | 1 | 1 |
| The Champ | 1931 | 5th | 2 | 4 |
| Bad Girl | 1931 | 5th | 2 | 3 |
| Dr. Jekyll and Mr. Hyde | 1931 | 5th | 1 | 3 |
| Shanghai Express | 1932 | 5th | 1 | 3 |
| Flowers and Trees | 1932 | 5th | 1 | 1 |
| The Music Box | 1932 | 5th | 1 | 1 |
| The Sin of Madelon Claudet | 1931 | 5th | 1 | 1 |
| Transatlantic | 1931 | 5th | 1 | 1 |
| Wrestling Swordfish | 1931 | 5th | 1 | 1 |
| Arrowsmith | 1931 | 5th | 0 | 4 |
| The Guardsman | 1931 | 5th | 0 | 2 |
| À Nous la Liberté | 1931 | 5th | 0 | 1 |
| Emma | 1932 | 5th | 0 | 1 |
| Five Star Final | 1931 | 5th | 0 | 1 |
| It's Got Me Again! | 1932 | 5th | 0 | 1 |
| Lady and Gent | 1932 | 5th | 0 | 1 |
| Mickey's Orphans | 1931 | 5th | 0 | 1 |
| One Hour with You | 1932 | 5th | 0 | 1 |
| Scratch-As-Catch-Can | 1932 | 5th | 0 | 1 |
| Screen Souvenirs | 1932 | 5th | 0 | 1 |
| Swing High | 1932 | 5th | 0 | 1 |
| The Loud Mouth | 1932 | 5th | 0 | 1 |
| The Smiling Lieutenant | 1931 | 5th | 0 | 1 |
| The Star Witness | 1931 | 5th | 0 | 1 |
| What Price Hollywood? | 1932 | 5th | 0 | 1 |
| Stout Hearts and Willing Hands | 1931 | 5th | 0 | 0 |
| **Cavalcade** | 1933 | 6th | 3 | 4 |
| A Farewell to Arms | 1932 | 6th | 2 | 4 |
| Little Women | 1933 | 6th | 1 | 3 |
| The Private Life of Henry VIII | 1933 | 6th | 1 | 2 |
| Krakatoa | 1933 | 6th | 1 | 1 |
| Morning Glory | 1933 | 6th | 1 | 1 |
| One Way Passage | 1932 | 6th | 1 | 1 |
| So This Is Harris! | 1933 | 6th | 1 | 1 |
| Three Little Pigs | 1933 | 6th | 1 | 1 |
| Lady for a Day | 1933 | 6th | 0 | 4 |
| I Am a Fugitive from a Chain Gang | 1932 | 6th | 0 | 3 |
| 42nd Street | 1933 | 6th | 0 | 2 |
| State Fair | 1933 | 6th | 0 | 2 |
| A Preferred List | 1933 | 6th | 0 | 1 |
| Berkeley Square | 1933 | 6th | 0 | 1 |
| Building a Building | 1933 | 6th | 0 | 1 |
| Gold Diggers of 1933 | 1933 | 6th | 0 | 1 |
| Menu | 1933 | 6th | 0 | 1 |
| Mister Mugg | 1933 | 6th | 0 | 1 |
| Rasputin and the Empress | 1932 | 6th | 0 | 1 |
| Reunion in Vienna | 1933 | 6th | 0 | 1 |
| She Done Him Wrong | 1933 | 6th | 0 | 1 |
| Sign of the Cross | 1932 | 6th | 0 | 1 |
| Smilin' Through | 1932 | 6th | 0 | 1 |
| The Merry Old Soul | 1933 | 6th | 0 | 1 |
| The Prizefighter and the Lady | 1933 | 6th | 0 | 1 |
| The Sea | 1933 | 6th | 0 | 1 |
| When Ladies Meet | 1933 | 6th | 0 | 1 |
| **It Happened One Night** | 1934 | 7th | 5 | 5 |
| One Night of Love | 1934 | 7th | 2 (1) | 6 |
| Cleopatra | 1934 | 7th | 1 | 5 |
| The Gay Divorcee | 1934 | 7th | 1 | 5 |
| Viva Villa! | 1934 | 7th | 1 | 4 |
| City of Wax | 1934 | 7th | 1 | 1 |
| Eskimo | 1933 | 7th | 1 | 1 |
| La Cucaracha | 1934 | 7th | 1 | 1 |
| Manhattan Melodrama | 1934 | 7th | 1 | 1 |
| The Merry Widow | 1934 | 7th | 1 | 1 |
| The Tortoise and the Hare | 1935 | 7th | 1 | 1 |
| The Affairs of Cellini | 1934 | 7th | 0 | 4 |
| The Thin Man | 1934 | 7th | 0 | 4 |
| Imitation of Life | 1934 | 7th | 0 | 3 |
| Flirtation Walk | 1934 | 7th | 0 | 2 |
| The Barretts of Wimpole Street | 1934 | 7th | 0 | 2 |
| The White Parade | 1934 | 7th | 0 | 2 |
| Bosom Friends | 1934 | 7th | 0 | 1 |
| Flying Down to Rio | 1933 | 7th | 0 | 1 |
| Here Comes the Navy | 1934 | 7th | 0 | 1 |
| Hide-Out | 1934 | 7th | 0 | 1 |
| Holiday Land | 1934 | 7th | 0 | 1 |
| Jolly Little Elves | 1934 | 7th | 0 | 1 |
| Men in Black | 1934 | 7th | 0 | 1 |
| Of Human Bondage | 1934 | 7th | 0 | 1 |
| Operator 13 | 1934 | 7th | 0 | 1 |
| She Loves Me Not | 1934 | 7th | 0 | 1 |
| Strikes and Spares | 1934 | 7th | 0 | 1 |
| The House of Rothschild | 1934 | 7th | 0 | 1 |
| The Lost Patrol | 1934 | 7th | 0 | 1 |
| The Richest Girl in the World | 1934 | 7th | 0 | 1 |
| What, No Men! | 1934 | 7th | 0 | 1 |
| **Mutiny on the Bounty** | 1935 | 8th | 1 | 8 |
| The Informer | 1935 | 8th | 4 | 6 |
| A Midsummer Night's Dream | 1935 | 8th | 2 | 4 |
| The Lives of a Bengal Lancer | 1935 | 8th | 1 | 7 |
| Broadway Melody of 1936 | 1935 | 8th | 1 | 3 |
| The Dark Angel | 1935 | 8th | 1 | 3 |
| Gold Diggers of 1935 | 1935 | 8th | 1 | 2 |
| Naughty Marietta | 1935 | 8th | 1 | 2 |
| Dangerous | 1935 | 8th | 1 | 1 |
| How to Sleep | 1935 | 8th | 1 | 1 |
| The Scoundrel | 1935 | 8th | 1 | 1 |
| Three Orphan Kittens | 1935 | 8th | 1 | 1 |
| Wings Over Everest | 1934 | 8th | 1 | 1 |
| Captain Blood | 1935 | 8th | 0 | 5 |
| Les Misérables | 1935 | 8th | 0 | 4 |
| Top Hat | 1935 | 8th | 0 | 4 |
| David Copperfield | 1935 | 8th | 0 | 3 |
| Alice Adams | 1935 | 8th | 0 | 2 |
| $1,000 a Minute | 1935 | 8th | 0 | 1 |
| All the King's Horses | 1935 | 8th | 0 | 1 |
| Audioscopiks | 1935 | 8th | 0 | 1 |
| Barbary Coast | 1935 | 8th | 0 | 1 |
| Becky Sharp | 1935 | 8th | 0 | 1 |
| Black Fury | 1935 | 8th | 0 | 1 |
| Bride of Frankenstein | 1935 | 8th | 0 | 1 |
| Broadway Hostess | 1935 | 8th | 0 | 1 |
| Camera Thrills | 1935 | 8th | 0 | 1 |
| Escape Me Never | 1935 | 8th | 0 | 1 |
| Folies Bergère de Paris | 1935 | 8th | 1 | 1 |
| G Men | 1935 | 8th | 0 | 1 |
| Go into Your Dance | 1935 | 8th | 0 | 1 |
| I Dream Too Much | 1935 | 8th | 0 | 1 |
| King of Burlesque | 1936 | 8th | 0 | 1 |
| Love Me Forever | 1935 | 8th | 0 | 1 |
| Oh, My Nerves | 1935 | 8th | 0 | 1 |
| Peter Ibbetson | 1935 | 8th | 0 | 1 |
| Private Worlds | 1935 | 8th | 0 | 1 |
| Roberta | 1935 | 8th | 0 | 1 |
| Ruggles of Red Gap | 1935 | 8th | 0 | 1 |
| She | 1935 | 8th | 0 | 1 |
| Thanks a Million | 1935 | 8th | 0 | 1 |
| The Big Broadcast of 1936 | 1935 | 8th | 0 | 1 |
| The Calico Dragon | 1935 | 8th | 0 | 1 |
| The Crusades | 1935 | 8th | 0 | 1 |
| The Gay Deception | 1935 | 8th | 0 | 1 |
| Tit for Tat | 1935 | 8th | 0 | 1 |
| Who Killed Cock Robin? | 1935 | 8th | 0 | 1 |
| **The Great Ziegfeld** | 1936 | 9th | 3 | 7 |
| Anthony Adverse | 1936 | 9th | 4 | 7 |
| The Story of Louis Pasteur | 1936 | 9th | 3 | 4 |
| Dodsworth | 1936 | 9th | 1 | 7 |
| San Francisco | 1936 | 9th | 1 | 6 |
| Mr. Deeds Goes to Town | 1936 | 9th | 1 | 5 |
| The Charge of the Light Brigade | 1936 | 9th | 1 | 3 |
| Come and Get It | 1936 | 9th | 1 | 2 |
| Swing Time | 1936 | 9th | 1 | 2 |
| Bored of Education | 1936 | 9th | 1 | 1 |
| Give Me Liberty | 1936 | 9th | 1 | 1 |
| The Country Cousin | 1936 | 9th | 1 | 1 |
| The Public Pays | 1936 | 9th | 1 | 1 |
| My Man Godfrey | 1936 | 9th | 0 | 6 |
| Romeo and Juliet | 1936 | 9th | 0 | 4 |
| The General Died at Dawn | 1936 | 9th | 0 | 3 |
| Three Smart Girls | 1936 | 9th | 0 | 3 |
| A Tale of Two Cities | 1935 | 9th | 0 | 2 |
| Born to Dance | 1936 | 9th | 0 | 2 |
| Lloyd's of London | 1936 | 9th | 0 | 2 |
| The Garden of Allah | 1936 | 9th | 0 (1) | 2 |
| The Gorgeous Hussy | 1936 | 9th | 0 | 2 |
| Theodora Goes Wild | 1936 | 9th | 0 | 2 |
| Winterset | 1936 | 9th | 0 | 2 |
| After the Thin Man | 1936 | 9th | 0 | 1 |
| Banjo on My Knee | 1936 | 9th | 0 | 1 |
| Cain and Mabel | 1936 | 9th | 0 | 1 |
| Dancing Pirate | 1936 | 9th | 0 | 1 |
| Double or Nothing | 1936 | 9th | 0 | 1 |
| Dummy Ache | 1936 | 9th | 0 | 1 |
| Fury | 1936 | 9th | 0 | 1 |
| General Spanky | 1936 | 9th | 0 | 1 |
| Gold Diggers of 1937 | 1936 | 9th | 0 | 1 |
| La Fiesta de Santa Barbara | 1935 | 9th | 0 | 1 |
| Libeled Lady | 1936 | 9th | 0 | 1 |
| The Magnificent Brute | 1936 | 9th | 0 | 1 |
| Moscow Moods | 1936 | 9th | 0 | 1 |
| One in a Million | 1936 | 9th | 0 | 1 |
| Pennies from Heaven | 1936 | 9th | 0 | 1 |
| Pigskin Parade | 1936 | 9th | 0 | 1 |
| Popeye the Sailor Meets Sindbad the Sailor | 1936 | 9th | 0 | 1 |
| Popular Science J-6-2 | 1935 | 9th | 0 | 1 |
| Sing, Baby, Sing | 1936 | 9th | 0 | 1 |
| Suzy | 1936 | 9th | 0 | 1 |
| That Girl from Paris | 1936 | 9th | 0 | 1 |
| The Last of the Mohicans | 1936 | 9th | 0 | 1 |
| The Old Mill Pond | 1936 | 9th | 0 | 1 |
| The Texas Rangers | 1936 | 9th | 0 | 1 |
| These Three | 1936 | 9th | 0 | 1 |
| The Trail of the Lonesome Pine | 1936 | 9th | 0 | 1 |
| Valiant Is the Word for Carrie | 1936 | 9th | 0 | 1 |
| Wanted – A Master | 1936 | 9th | 0 | 1 |
| **The Life of Emile Zola** | 1937 | 10th | 3 | 10 |
| Lost Horizon | 1937 | 10th | 2 | 7 |
| In Old Chicago | 1938 | 10th | 2 | 6 |
| The Good Earth | 1937 | 10th | 2 | 5 |
| A Star Is Born | 1937 | 10th | 1 (1) | 7 |
| The Awful Truth | 1937 | 10th | 1 | 6 |
| One Hundred Men and a Girl | 1937 | 10th | 1 | 5 |
| Captains Courageous | 1937 | 10th | 1 | 4 |
| The Hurricane | 1937 | 10th | 1 | 3 |
| A Damsel in Distress | 1937 | 10th | 1 | 2 |
| Waikiki Wedding | 1937 | 10th | 1 | 2 |
| Penny Wisdom | 1937 | 10th | 1 | 1 |
| The Old Mill | 1937 | 10th | 1 | 1 |
| The Private Life of the Gannets | 1934 | 10th | 1 | 1 |
| Torture Money | 1937 | 10th | 1 | 1 |
| Dead End | 1937 | 10th | 0 | 4 |
| Stage Door | 1937 | 10th | 0 | 4 |
| Souls at Sea | 1937 | 10th | 0 | 3 |
| Conquest | 1937 | 10th | 0 | 2 |
| Maytime | 1937 | 10th | 0 | 2 |
| Night Must Fall | 1937 | 10th | 0 | 2 |
| Stella Dallas | 1937 | 10th | 0 | 2 |
| The Prisoner of Zenda | 1937 | 10th | 0 | 2 |
| Topper | 1937 | 10th | 0 | 2 |
| Walter Wanger's Vogues of 1938 | 1937 | 10th | 0 | 2 |
| A Day at the Races | 1937 | 10th | 0 | 1 |
| A Night at the Movies | 1937 | 10th | 0 | 1 |
| Ali Baba Goes to Town | 1937 | 10th | 0 | 1 |
| Artists and Models | 1937 | 10th | 0 | 1 |
| Black Legion | 1937 | 10th | 0 | 1 |
| Camille | 1936 | 10th | 0 | 1 |
| Deep South | 1937 | 10th | 0 | 1 |
| Educated Fish | 1937 | 10th | 0 | 1 |
| Every Day's a Holiday | 1937 | 10th | 0 | 1 |
| Hitting a New High | 1937 | 10th | 0 | 1 |
| Make a Wish | 1937 | 10th | 0 | 1 |
| Manhattan Merry-Go-Round | 1937 | 10th | 0 | 1 |
| Mr. Dodd Takes the Air | 1937 | 10th | 0 | 1 |
| Popular Science J-7-1 | 1937 | 10th | 0 | 1 |
| Portia on Trial | 1937 | 10th | 0 | 1 |
| Quality Street | 1937 | 10th | 0 | 1 |
| Ready, Willing, and Able | 1937 | 10th | 0 | 1 |
| Romance of Radium | 1937 | 10th | 0 | 1 |
| Shall We Dance | 1937 | 10th | 0 | 1 |
| Should Wives Work? | 1937 | 10th | 0 | 1 |
| Snow White and the Seven Dwarfs | 1937 | 10th / 11th | 0 (1) | 1 |
| Something to Sing About | 1937 | 10th | 0 | 1 |
| The Girl Said No | 1937 | 10th | 0 | 1 |
| The Little Match Girl | 1937 | 10th | 0 | 1 |
| The Man Without a Country | 1937 | 10th | 0 | 1 |
| Thin Ice | 1937 | 10th | 0 | 1 |
| Varsity Show | 1937 | 10th | 0 | 1 |
| Way Out West | 1937 | 10th | 0 | 1 |
| Wee Willie Winkie | 1937 | 10th | 0 | 1 |
| Wells Fargo | 1937 | 10th | 0 | 1 |
| Wings over Honolulu | 1937 | 10th | 0 | 1 |
| You're a Sweetheart | 1937 | 10th | 0 | 1 |
| **You Can't Take It with You** | 1938 | 11th | 2 | 7 |
| The Adventures of Robin Hood | 1938 | 11th | 3 | 4 |
| Boys Town | 1938 | 11th | 2 | 5 |
| Jezebel | 1938 | 11th | 2 | 5 |
| Alexander's Ragtime Band | 1938 | 11th | 1 | 6 |
| Pygmalion | 1938 | 11th | 1 | 4 |
| The Cowboy and the Lady | 1938 | 11th | 1 | 3 |
| The Great Waltz | 1938 | 11th | 1 | 3 |
| Declaration of Independence | 1938 | 11th | 1 | 1 |
| Ferdinand the Bull | 1938 | 11th | 1 | 1 |
| Kentucky | 1938 | 11th | 1 | 1 |
| Spawn of the North | 1938 | 11th | 0 (1) | 0 |
| That Mothers Might Live | 1938 | 11th | 1 | 1 |
| The Big Broadcast of 1938 | 1938 | 11th | 1 | 1 |
| Four Daughters | 1938 | 11th | 0 | 5 |
| Merrily We Live | 1938 | 11th | 0 | 5 |
| Algiers | 1938 | 11th | 0 | 4 |
| If I Were King | 1938 | 11th | 0 | 4 |
| Mad About Music | 1938 | 11th | 0 | 4 |
| Marie Antoinette | 1938 | 11th | 0 | 4 |
| The Citadel | 1938 | 11th | 0 | 4 |
| Angels with Dirty Faces | 1938 | 11th | 0 | 3 |
| Army Girl | 1938 | 11th | 0 | 3 |
| Carefree | 1938 | 11th | 0 | 3 |
| Suez | 1938 | 11th | 0 | 3 |
| Test Pilot | 1938 | 11th | 0 | 3 |
| Blockade | 1938 | 11th | 0 | 2 |
| Sweethearts | 1938 | 11th | 0 (1) | 2 |
| That Certain Age | 1938 | 11th | 0 | 2 |
| The Goldwyn Follies | 1938 | 11th | 0 | 2 |
| The Young in Heart | 1938 | 11th | 0 | 3 |
| Vivacious Lady | 1938 | 11th | 0 | 2 |
| Block-Heads | 1938 | 11th | 0 | 1 |
| Brave Little Tailor | 1938 | 11th | 0 | 1 |
| Breaking the Ice | 1938 | 11th | 0 | 1 |
| Girls' School | 1938 | 11th | 0 | 1 |
| Going Places | 1938 | 11th | 0 | 1 |
| Good Scouts | 1938 | 11th | 0 | 1 |
| La Grande Illusion | 1937 | 11th | 0 | 1 |
| Holiday | 1938 | 11th | 0 | 1 |
| Hunky and Spunky | 1938 | 11th | 0 | 1 |
| Mannequin | 1937 | 11th | 0 | 1 |
| Mother Goose Goes Hollywood | 1938 | 11th | 0 | 1 |
| Of Human Hearts | 1938 | 11th | 0 | 1 |
| Pacific Liner | 1939 | 11th | 0 | 1 |
| Storm Over Bengal | 1938 | 11th | 0 | 1 |
| Swingtime in the Movies | 1938 | 11th | 0 | 1 |
| The Adventures of Tom Sawyer | 1938 | 11th | 0 | 1 |
| The Buccaneer | 1938 | 11th | 0 | 1 |
| The Great Heart | 1938 | 11th | 0 | 1 |
| The Lady Objects | 1938 | 11th | 0 | 1 |
| There Goes My Heart | 1938 | 11th | 0 | 1 |
| They're Always Caught | 1938 | 11th | 0 | 1 |
| Three Comrades | 1938 | 11th | 0 | 1 |
| Timber Toppers | 1938 | 11th | 0 | 1 |
| Tropic Holiday | 1938 | 11th | 0 | 1 |
| Under Western Stars | 1938 | 11th | 0 | 1 |
| White Banners | 1938 | 11th | 0 | 1 |
| **Gone With the Wind** | 1939 | 12th | 8 (2) | 13 |
| Stagecoach | 1939 | 12th | 2 | 7 |
| The Wizard of Oz | 1939 | 12th | 2 | 5 |
| Mr. Smith Goes to Washington | 1939 | 12th | 1 | 11 |
| Wuthering Heights | 1939 | 12th | 1 | 8 |
| Goodbye, Mr. Chips | 1939 | 12th | 1 | 7 |
| The Rains Came | 1939 | 12th | 1 | 5 |
| Busy Little Bears | 1939 | 12th | 1 | 1 |
| Sons of Liberty | 1939 | 12th | 1 | 1 |
| The Ugly Duckling | 1939 | 12th | 1 | 1 |
| When Tomorrow Comes | 1939 | 12th | 1 | 1 |
| Love Affair | 1939 | 12th | 0 | 6 |
| The Private Lives of Elizabeth and Essex | 1939 | 12th | 0 | 5 |
| Ninotchka | 1939 | 12th | 0 | 4 |
| Of Mice and Men | 1939 | 12th | 0 | 4 |
| Dark Victory | 1939 | 12th | 0 | 3 |
| Man of Conquest | 1939 | 12th | 0 | 3 |
| Babes in Arms | 1939 | 12th | 0 | 2 |
| Beau Geste | 1939 | 12th | 0 | 2 |
| First Love | 1939 | 12th | 0 | 2 |
| Gulliver's Travels | 1939 | 12th | 0 | 2 |
| The Great Victor Herbert | 1939 | 12th | 0 | 2 |
| The Hunchback of Notre Dame | 1939 | 12th | 0 | 2 |
| Bachelor Mother | 1939 | 12th | 0 | 1 |
| Balalaika | 1939 | 12th | 0 | 1 |
| Captain Fury | 1939 | 12th | 0 | 1 |
| Detouring America | 1939 | 12th | 0 | 1 |
| Drums Along the Mohawk | 1939 | 12th | 0 | 1 |
| Drunk Driving | 1939 | 12th | 0 | 1 |
| Eternally Yours | 1939 | 12th | 0 | 1 |
| Five Times Five | 1939 | 12th | 0 | 1 |
| Golden Boy | 1939 | 12th | 0 | 1 |
| Information Please | 1939 | 12th | 0 | 1 |
| Intermezzo | 1939 | 12th | 0 | 1 |
| Juarez | 1939 | 12th | 0 | 1 |
| Nurse Edith Cavell | 1939 | 12th | 0 | 1 |
| Only Angels Have Wings | 1939 | 12th | 0 | 1 |
| Peace on Earth | 1939 | 12th | 0 | 1 |
| Prophet Without Honor | 1939 | 12th | 0 | 1 |
| Second Fiddle | 1939 | 12th | 0 | 1 |
| She Married a Cop | 1939 | 12th | 0 | 1 |
| Swanee River | 1939 | 12th | 0 | 1 |
| Sword Fishing | 1939 | 12th | 0 | 1 |
| The Man in the Iron Mask | 1939 | 12th | 0 | 1 |
| The Pointer | 1939 | 12th | 0 | 1 |
| They Shall Have Music | 1939 | 12th | 0 | 1 |
| Topper Takes a Trip | 1938 | 12th | 0 | 1 |
| Union Pacific | 1939 | 12th | 0 | 1 |
| Way Down South | 1939 | 12th | 0 | 1 |
| Young Mr. Lincoln | 1939 | 12th | 0 | 1 |
| **Rebecca** | 1940 | 13th | 2 | 11 |
| The Thief of Bagdad | 1940 | 13th | 3 | 4 |
| The Grapes of Wrath | 1940 | 13th | 2 | 7 |
| The Philadelphia Story | 1940 | 13th | 2 | 6 |
| Pinocchio | 1940 | 13th | 2 | 2 |
| Kitty Foyle | 1940 | 13th | 1 | 5 |
| North West Mounted Police | 1940 | 13th | 1 | 5 |
| Arise, My Love | 1940 | 13th | 1 | 4 |
| Strike Up the Band | 1940 | 13th | 1 | 3 |
| The Westerner | 1940 | 13th | 1 | 3 |
| Pride and Prejudice | 1940 | 13th | 1 | 1 |
| Quicker'n a Wink | 1940 | 13th | 1 | 1 |
| Teddy, the Rough Rider | 1940 | 13th | 1 | 1 |
| The Great McGinty | 1940 | 13th | 1 | 1 |
| The Milky Way | 1940 | 13th | 1 | 1 |
| Tin Pan Alley | 1940 | 13th | 1 | 1 |
| The Letter | 1940 | 13th | 0 | 7 |
| Foreign Correspondent | 1940 | 13th | 0 | 6 |
| Our Town | 1940 | 13th | 0 | 6 |
| The Long Voyage Home | 1940 | 13th | 0 | 6 |
| The Great Dictator | 1940 | 13th | 0 | 5 |
| Spring Parade | 1940 | 13th | 0 | 4 |
| The Sea Hawk | 1940 | 13th | 0 | 4 |
| All This, and Heaven Too | 1940 | 13th | 0 | 3 |
| Down Argentine Way | 1940 | 13th | 0 | 3 |
| My Favourite Wife | 1940 | 13th | 0 | 3 |
| Abe Lincoln in Illinois | 1940 | 13th | 0 | 2 |
| Arizona | 1940 | 13th | 0 | 2 |
| Bitter Sweet | 1940 | 13th | 0 | 2 |
| Boom Town | 1940 | 13th | 0 | 2 |
| Dark Command | 1940 | 13th | 0 | 2 |
| Hit Parade of 1941 | 1940 | 13th | 0 | 2 |
| One Million B.C. | 1940 | 13th | 0 | 2 |
| Second Chorus | 1940 | 13th | 0 | 2 |
| The Blue Bird | 1940 | 13th | 0 | 2 |
| The Boys from Syracuse | 1940 | 13th | 0 | 2 |
| The Howards of Virginia | 1940 | 13th | 0 | 2 |
| Waterloo Bridge | 1940 | 13th | 0 | 2 |
| A Wild Hare | 1940 | 13th | 0 | 1 |
| Angels Over Broadway | 1940 | 13th | 0 | 1 |
| Behind the News | 1940 | 13th | 0 | 1 |
| Captain Caution | 1940 | 13th | 0 | 1 |
| Comrade X | 1940 | 13th | 0 | 1 |
| Dr. Cyclops | 1940 | 13th | 0 | 1 |
| Dr. Ehrlich's Magic Bullet | 1940 | 13th | 0 | 1 |
| Edison, the Man | 1940 | 13th | 0 | 1 |
| Eyes of the Navy | 1940 | 13th | 0 | 1 |
| Irene | 1940 | 13th | 0 | 1 |
| Lillian Russell | 1940 | 13th | 0 | 1 |
| London Can Take It! | 1940 | 13th | 0 | 1 |
| More About Nostradamus | 1941 | 13th | 0 | 1 |
| Music in My Heart | 1940 | 13th | 0 | 1 |
| My Son, My Son! | 1940 | 13th | 0 | 1 |
| Northwest Passage | 1940 | 13th | 0 | 1 |
| Primrose Path | 1940 | 13th | 0 | 1 |
| Puss Gets the Boot | 1940 | 13th | 0 | 1 |
| Rhythm on the River | 1940 | 13th | 0 | 1 |
| Service with the Colors | 1940 | 13th | 0 | 1 |
| Siege | 1940 | 13th | 0 | 1 |
| Swiss Family Robinson | 1940 | 13th | 0 | 1 |
| The Fight for Life | 1940 | 13th | 0 | 1 |
| The House of the Seven Gables | 1940 | 13th | 0 | 1 |
| The Invisible Man Returns | 1940 | 13th | 0 | 1 |
| The Mark of Zorro | 1940 | 13th | 0 | 1 |
| They Knew What They Wanted | 1940 | 13th | 0 | 1 |
| Too Many Husbands | 1940 | 13th | 0 | 1 |
| Typhoon | 1940 | 13th | 0 | 1 |
| Women in War | 1940 | 13th | 0 | 1 |
| You'll Find Out | 1940 | 13th | 0 | 1 |
| **How Green Was My Valley** | 1941 | 14th | 5 | 10 |
| Sergeant York | 1941 | 14th | 2 | 11 |
| Here Comes Mr. Jordan | 1941 | 14th | 2 | 7 |
| Citizen Kane | 1941 | 14th | 1 | 9 |
| Blossoms in the Dust | 1941 | 14th | 1 | 4 |
| That Hamilton Woman | 1941 | 14th | 1 | 4 |
| Suspicion | 1941 | 14th | 1 | 3 |
| All That Money Can Buy | 1941 | 14th | 1 | 2 |
| Blood and Sand | 1941 | 14th | 1 | 2 |
| Dumbo | 1941 | 14th | 1 | 2 |
| Churchill's Island | 1941 | 14th | 1 | 1 |
| I Wanted Wings | 1941 | 14th | 1 | 1 |
| Lady Be Good | 1941 | 14th | 1 | 1 |
| Lend a Paw | 1941 | 14th | 1 | 1 |
| Main Street on the March! | 1941 | 14th | 1 | 1 |
| Of Pups and Puzzles | 1941 | 14th | 1 | 1 |
| The Great Lie | 1941 | 14th | 1 | 1 |
| The Little Foxes | 1941 | 14th | 0 | 9 |
| Hold Back the Dawn | 1941 | 14th | 0 | 6 |
| Ball of Fire | 1941 | 14th | 0 | 4 |
| Dr. Jekyll and Mr. Hyde | 1941 | 14th | 0 | 3 |
| Sun Valley Serenade | 1941 | 14th | 0 | 3 |
| Sundown | 1941 | 14th | 0 | 3 |
| The Chocolate Soldier | 1941 | 14th | 0 | 3 |
| The Maltese Falcon | 1941 | 14th | 0 | 3 |
| All-American Co-Ed | 1941 | 14th | 0 | 2 |
| Aloma of the South Seas | 1941 | 14th | 0 | 2 |
| Buck Privates | 1941 | 14th | 0 | 2 |
| Dive Bomber | 1941 | 14th | 0 | 1 |
| Ladies in Retirement | 1941 | 14th | 0 | 2 |
| Louisiana Purchase | 1941 | 14th | 0 | 2 |
| The Devil and Miss Jones | 1941 | 14th | 0 | 2 |
| Topper Returns | 1941 | 14th | 0 | 2 |
| You'll Never Get Rich | 1941 | 14th | 0 | 2 |
| A Letter from Home | 1941 | 14th | 0 | 1 |
| A Place to Live | 1941 | 14th | 0 | 1 |
| A Yank in the R.A.F. | 1941 | 14th | 0 | 1 |
| Adventure in the Bronx | 1941 | 14th | 0 | 1 |
| Alive in the Deep | 1941 | 14th | 0 | 1 |
| Appointment for Love | 1941 | 14th | 0 | 1 |
| Army Champions | 1941 | 14th | 0 | 1 |
| Back Street | 1941 | 14th | 0 | 1 |
| Beauty and the Beach | 1941 | 14th | 0 | 1 |
| Billy the Kid | 1941 | 14th | 0 | 1 |
| Birth of the Blues | 1941 | 14th | 0 | 1 |
| Blues in the Night | 1941 | 14th | 0 | 1 |
| Bomber: A Defense Report on Film | 1941 | 14th | 0 | 1 |
| Boogie Woogie Bugle Boy of Company B | 1941 | 14th | 0 | 1 |
| Cheers for Miss Bishop | 1941 | 14th | 0 | 1 |
| Christmas Under Fire | 1941 | 14th | 0 | 1 |
| Down on the Farm | 1941 | 14th | 0 | 1 |
| Flight Command | 1940 | 14th | 0 | 1 |
| Forbidden Passage | 1941 | 14th | 0 | 1 |
| Forty Boys and a Song | 1941 | 14th | 0 | 1 |
| Hiawatha's Rabbit Hunt | 1941 | 14th | 0 | 1 |
| How War Came | 1941 | 14th | 0 | 1 |
| Ice-Capades | 1940 | 14th | 0 | 1 |
| King of the Zombies | 1941 | 14th | 0 | 1 |
| Kings of the Turf | 1941 | 14th | 0 | 1 |
| Las Vegas Nights | 1941 | 14th | 0 | 1 |
| Life of a Thoroughbred | 1941 | 14th | 0 | 1 |
| Lydia | 1941 | 14th | 0 | 1 |
| Meet John Doe | 1941 | 14th | 0 | 1 |
| Mercy Island | 1941 | 14th | 0 | 1 |
| Night Train to Munich | 1940 | 14th | 0 | 1 |
| Norway in Revolt | 1941 | 14th | 0 | 1 |
| One Foot in Heaven | 1941 | 14th | 0 | 1 |
| Penny Serenade | 1941 | 14th | 0 | 1 |
| Rhapsody in Rivets | 1941 | 14th | 0 | 1 |
| Rhythm in the Ranks | 1941 | 14th | 0 | 1 |
| Ridin' on a Rainbow | 1941 | 14th | 0 | 1 |
| Russian Soil | 1941 | 14th | 0 | 1 |
| Sagebrush and Silver | 1941 | 14th | 0 | 1 |
| Sis Hopkins | 1941 | 14th | 0 | 0 |
| Skylark | 1941 | 14th | 0 | 1 |
| So Ends Our Night | 1941 | 14th | 0 | 1 |
| Soldiers of the Sky | 1941 | 14th | 0 | 1 |
| Sunny | 1941 | 14th | 0 | 1 |
| Superman | 1941 | 14th | 0 | 1 |
| Tall, Dark and Handsome | 1941 | 14th | 0 | 1 |
| Tanks a Million | 1941 | 14th | 0 | 1 |
| That Uncertain Feeling | 1941 | 14th | 0 | 1 |
| The Devil Pays Off | 1941 | 14th | 0 | 1 |
| The Flame of New Orleans | 1941 | 14th | 0 | 1 |
| The Gay Parisian | 1941 | 14th | 0 | 1 |
| The Invisible Woman | 1940 | 14th | 0 | 1 |
| The Lady Eve | 1941 | 14th | 0 | 1 |
| The Men in Her Life | 1941 | 14th | 0 | 1 |
| The Night Before Christmas | 1941 | 14th | 0 | 1 |
| The Rookie Bear | 1941 | 14th | 0 | 1 |
| The Sea Wolf | 1941 | 14th | 0 | 1 |
| The Son of Monte Cristo | 1940 | 14th | 0 | 1 |
| The Strawberry Blonde | 1941 | 14th | 0 | 1 |
| The Tanks Are Coming | 1941 | 14th | 0 | 1 |
| This Woman Is Mine | 1941 | 14th | 0 | 1 |
| Tom, Dick and Harry | 1941 | 14th | 0 | 1 |
| Truant Officer Donald | 1941 | 14th | 0 | 1 |
| War Clouds in the Pacific | 1941 | 14th | 0 | 1 |
| When Ladies Meet | 1941 | 14th | 0 | 1 |
| Fantasia | 1940 | 14th | 0 (2) | 0 |
| Kukan | 1941 | 14th | 0 (1) | 0 |
| Target for Tonight | 1941 | 14th | 0 (1) | 0 |
| **Mrs. Miniver** | 1942 | 15th | 6 | 12 |
| Yankee Doodle Dandy | 1942 | 15th | 3 | 8 |
| The Pride of the Yankees | 1942 | 15th | 1 | 11 |
| This Above All | 1942 | 15th | 1 | 4 |
| 49th Parallel | 1941 | 15th | 1 | 3 |
| Holiday Inn | 1942 | 15th | 1 | 3 |
| Now, Voyager | 1942 | 15th | 1 | 3 |
| Reap the Wild Wind | 1942 | 15th | 1 | 3 |
| The Black Swan | 1942 | 15th | 1 | 3 |
| My Gal Sal | 1942 | 15th | 1 | 2 |
| Woman of the Year | 1942 | 15th | 1 | 2 |
| Beyond the Line of Duty | 1942 | 15th | 1 | 1 |
| Der Fuehrer's Face | 1943 | 15th | 1 | 1 |
| Johnny Eager | 1941 | 15th | 1 | 1 |
| Kokoda Front Line! | 1942 | 15th | 1 | 1 |
| Moscow Strikes Back | 1942 | 15th | 1 | 1 |
| Prelude to War | 1942 | 15th | 1 | 1 |
| Speaking of Animals and Their Families | 1942 | 15th | 1 | 1 |
| The Battle of Midway | 1942 | 15th | 1 | 1 |
| Random Harvest | 1942 | 15th | 0 | 7 |
| The Talk of the Town | 1942 | 15th | 0 | 7 |
| Arabian Nights | 1942 | 15th | 0 | 4 |
| Jungle Book | 1942 | 15th | 0 | 4 |
| The Magnificent Ambersons | 1942 | 15th | 0 | 4 |
| Wake Island | 1942 | 15th | 0 | 4 |
| Bambi | 1942 | 15th | 0 | 3 |
| Flying Tigers | 1942 | 15th | 0 | 3 |
| Kings Row | 1942 | 15th | 0 | 3 |
| Take a Letter, Darling | 1942 | 15th | 0 | 3 |
| The Pied Piper | 1942 | 15th | 0 | 3 |
| You Were Never Lovelier | 1942 | 15th | 0 | 3 |
| Captains of the Clouds | 1942 | 15th | 0 | 2 |
| Flying with Music | 1942 | 15th | 0 | 2 |
| One of Our Aircraft Is Missing | 1942 | 15th | 0 | 2 |
| Road to Morocco | 1942 | 15th | 0 | 2 |
| Silver Queen | 1942 | 15th | 0 | 2 |
| The Gold Rush | 1942 | 15th | 0 | 2 |
| The Shanghai Gesture | 1941 | 15th | 0 | 2 |
| A Ship Is Born | 1942 | 15th | 0 | 1 |
| Africa, Prelude to Victory | 1942 | 15th | 0 | 1 |
| All Out for V | 1942 | 15th | 0 | 1 |
| Always in My Heart | 1942 | 15th | 0 | 1 |
| Babes on Broadway | 1941 | 15th | 0 | 1 |
| Blitz Wolf | 1942 | 15th | 0 | 1 |
| Combat Report | 1942 | 15th | 0 | 1 |
| Conquer by the Clock | 1942 | 15th | 0 | 1 |
| Desert Wonderland | 1942 | 15th | 0 | 1 |
| Desperate Journey | 1942 | 15th | 0 | 1 |
| Don't Talk | 1942 | 15th | 0 | 1 |
| For Me and My Gal | 1942 | 15th | 0 | 1 |
| Friendly Enemies | 1942 | 15th | 0 | 1 |
| George Washington Slept Here | 1942 | 15th | 0 | 1 |
| Hellzapoppin' | 1941 | 15th | 0 | 1 |
| Henry Browne, Farmer | 1942 | 15th | 0 | 1 |
| High Over the Borders | 1942 | 15th | 0 | 1 |
| High Stakes in the East | 1942 | 15th | 0 | 1 |
| I Married a Witch | 1942 | 15th | 0 | 1 |
| In Which We Serve | 1942 | 15th / 16th | 0 (1) | 2 |
| Inside Fighting China | 1941 | 15th | 0 | 1 |
| Invisible Agent | 1942 | 15th | 0 | 1 |
| It Started with Eve | 1941 | 15th | 0 | 1 |
| It's Everybody's War | 1942 | 15th | 0 | 1 |
| Joan of Paris | 1942 | 15th | 0 | 1 |
| Johnny Doughboy | 1942 | 15th | 0 | 1 |
| Juke Box Jamboree | 1942 | 15th | 0 | 1 |
| Klondike Fury | 1942 | 15th | 0 | 1 |
| Listen to Britain | 1942 | 15th | 0 | 1 |
| Little Belgium | 1942 | 15th | 0 | 1 |
| Little Isles of Freedom | 1943 | 15th | 0 | 1 |
| Marines in the Making | 1942 | 15th | 0 | 1 |
| Moontide | 1942 | 15th | 0 | 1 |
| Mr. Blabbermouth! | 1942 | 15th | 0 | 1 |
| Mr. Gardenia Jones | 1942 | 15th | 0 | 1 |
| My Sister Eileen | 1942 | 15th | 0 | 1 |
| Once Upon a Honeymoon | 1942 | 15th | 0 | 1 |
| Orchestra Wives | 1942 | 15th | 0 | 1 |
| Pigs in a Polka | 1943 | 15th | 0 | 1 |
| Private Smith of the U.S.A. | 1942 | 15th | 0 | 1 |
| Ten Gentlemen from West Point | 1942 | 15th | 0 | 1 |
| The Corsican Brothers | 1941 | 15th | 0 | 1 |
| The Grain That Built a Hemisphere | 1943 | 15th | 0 | 1 |
| The Mayor of 44th Street | 1942 | 15th | 0 | 1 |
| The Navy Comes Through | 1942 | 15th | 0 | 1 |
| The New Spirit | 1942 | 15th | 0 | 1 |
| The Price of Victory | 1942 | 15th | 0 | 1 |
| The Spoilers | 1942 | 15th | 0 | 1 |
| The War Against Mrs. Hadley | 1942 | 15th | 0 | 1 |
| To Be or Not to Be | 1942 | 15th | 0 | 1 |
| To the Shores of Tripoli | 1942 | 15th | 0 | 1 |
| Tortilla Flat | 1942 | 15th | 0 | 1 |
| Tulips Shall Grow | 1942 | 15th | 0 | 1 |
| Twenty-One Miles | 1942 | 15th | 0 | 1 |
| United States Marine Band | 1942 | 15th | 0 | 1 |
| We Refuse to Die | 1942 | 15th | 0 | 1 |
| The White Eagle | 1942 | 15th | 0 | 1 |
| Winning Your Wings | 1942 | 15th | 0 | 1 |
| Youth on Parade | 1942 | 15th | 0 | 1 |
| **Casablanca** | 1942 | 16th | 3 | 8 |
| The Song of Bernadette | 1943 | 16th | 4 | 12 |
| Phantom of the Opera | 1943 | 16th | 2 | 4 |
| For Whom the Bell Tolls | 1943 | 16th | 1 | 9 |
| The More the Merrier | 1943 | 16th | 1 | 6 |
| The Human Comedy | 1943 | 16th | 1 | 5 |
| Air Force | 1943 | 16th | 1 | 4 |
| Watch on the Rhine | 1943 | 16th | 1 | 4 |
| This Is the Army | 1943 | 16th | 1 | 3 |
| Hello, Frisco, Hello | 1943 | 16th | 1 | 2 |
| Amphibious Fighters | 1943 | 16th | 1 | 1 |
| Crash Dive | 1943 | 16th | 1 | 1 |
| December 7th | 1943 | 16th | 1 | 1 |
| Desert Victory | 1943 | 16th | 1 | 1 |
| Heavenly Music | 1943 | 16th | 1 | 1 |
| Princess O'Rourke | 1943 | 16th | 1 | 1 |
| The Yankee Doodle Mouse | 1943 | 16th | 1 | 1 |
| This Land Is Mine | 1943 | 16th | 1 | 1 |
| Madame Curie | 1943 | 16th | 0 | 7 |
| The North Star | 1943 | 16th | 0 | 6 |
| So Proudly We Hail! | 1943 | 16th | 0 | 4 |
| Five Graves to Cairo | 1943 | 16th | 0 | 3 |
| Heaven Can Wait | 1943 | 16th | 0 | 3 |
| Sahara | 1943 | 16th | 0 | 3 |
| Saludos Amigos | 1942 | 16th | 0 | 3 |
| Thousands Cheer | 1943 | 16th | 0 | 3 |
| Hangmen Also Die! | 1943 | 16th | 0 | 2 |
| Hit Parade of 1943 | 1943 | 16th | 0 | 2 |
| In Old Oklahoma | 1943 | 16th | 0 | 2 |
| Something to Shout About | 1943 | 16th | 0 | 2 |
| Stage Door Canteen | 1943 | 16th | 0 | 2 |
| Star Spangled Rhythm | 1942 | 16th | 0 | 2 |
| The Sky's the Limit | 1943 | 16th | 0 | 2 |
| Action in the North Atlantic | 1943 | 16th | 0 | 1 |
| Baptism of Fire | 1943 | 16th | 0 | 1 |
| Bombardier | 1943 | 16th | 0 | 1 |
| Cabin in the Sky | 1943 | 16th | 0 | 1 |
| Cavalcade of Dance | 1943 | 16th | 0 | 1 |
| Champions Carry On | 1943 | 16th | 0 | 1 |
| Children of Mars | 1943 | 16th | 0 | 1 |
| Commandos Strike at Dawn | 1942 | 16th | 0 | 1 |
| Coney Island | 1943 | 16th | 0 | 1 |
| Corvette K-225 | 1943 | 16th | 0 | 1 |
| Destination Tokyo | 1943 | 16th | 0 | 1 |
| Flight for Freedom | 1943 | 16th | 0 | 1 |
| Greetings Bait | 1943 | 16th | 0 | 1 |
| Hers to Hold | 1943 | 16th | 0 | 1 |
| Hi Diddle Diddle | 1943 | 16th | 0 | 1 |
| Hollywood in Uniform | 1943 | 16th | 0 | 1 |
| Holy Matrimony | 1943 | 16th | 0 | 1 |
| Imagination | 1943 | 16th | 0 | 1 |
| Johnny Come Lately | 1943 | 16th | 0 | 1 |
| Lady of Burlesque | 1943 | 16th | 0 | 1 |
| Lassie Come Home | 1943 | 16th | 0 | 1 |
| Letter to a Hero | 1943 | 16th | 0 | 1 |
| Mardi Gras | 1943 | 16th | 0 | 1 |
| Mission to Moscow | 1943 | 16th | 0 | 1 |
| Plan for Destruction | 1943 | 16th | 0 | 1 |
| Reason and Emotion | 1943 | 16th | 0 | 1 |
| Report from the Aleutians | 1943 | 16th | 0 | 1 |
| Riding High | 1943 | 16th | 0 | 1 |
| Seeing Hands | 1943 | 16th | 0 | 1 |
| Shadow of a Doubt | 1943 | 16th | 0 | 1 |
| So This Is Washington | 1943 | 16th | 0 | 1 |
| Stand By for Action | 1942 | 16th | 0 | 1 |
| Swedes in America | 1943 | 16th | 0 | 1 |
| Thank Your Lucky Stars | 1943 | 16th | 0 | 1 |
| The 500 Hats of Bartholomew Cubbins | 1943 | 16th | 0 | 1 |
| The Amazing Mrs. Holliday | 1943 | 16th | 0 | 1 |
| The Battle of Russia | 1943 | 16th | 0 | 1 |
| The Constant Nymph | 1943 | 16th | 0 | 1 |
| The Dizzy Acrobat | 1943 | 16th | 0 | 1 |
| The Fallen Sparrow | 1943 | 16th | 0 | 1 |
| The Gang's All Here | 1943 | 16th | 0 | 1 |
| The Kansan | 1943 | 16th | 0 | 1 |
| The Moon and Sixpence | 1942 | 16th | 0 | 1 |
| The Ox-Bow Incident | 1943 | 16th | 0 | 1 |
| To the People of the United States | 1944 | 16th | 0 | 1 |
| Tomorrow We Fly | 1943 | 16th | 0 | 1 |
| Victory Through Air Power | 1943 | 16th | 0 | 1 |
| War Department Report | 1943 | 16th | 0 | 1 |
| Women at War | 1943 | 16th | 0 | 1 |
| Youth in Crisis | 1943 | 16th | 0 | 1 |
| **Going My Way** | 1944 | 17th | 7 | 10 |
| Wilson | 1944 | 17th | 5 | 10 |
| Gaslight | 1944 | 17th | 2 | 7 |
| Since You Went Away | 1944 | 17th | 1 | 9 |
| Cover Girl | 1944 | 17th | 1 | 5 |
| Laura | 1944 | 17th | 1 | 5 |
| None but the Lonely Heart | 1944 | 17th | 1 | 4 |
| Thirty Seconds Over Tokyo | 1944 | 17th | 1 | 2 |
| I Won't Play | 1944 | 17th | 1 | 1 |
| Mouse Trouble | 1944 | 17th | 1 | 1 |
| The Fighting Lady | 1944 | 17th | 1 | 1 |
| Who's Who in Animal Land | 1944 | 17th | 1 | 1 |
| With the Marines at Tarawa | 1944 | 17th | 1 | 1 |
| Double Indemnity | 1944 | 17th | 0 | 7 |
| Kismet | 1944 | 17th | 0 | 4 |
| Meet Me in St. Louis | 1944 | 17th | 0 | 4 |
| Brazil | 1944 | 17th | 0 | 3 |
| Casanova Brown | 1944 | 17th | 0 | 3 |
| Hollywood Canteen | 1944 | 17th | 0 | 3 |
| Lady in the Dark | 1944 | 17th | 0 | 3 |
| Lifeboat | 1944 | 17th | 0 | 3 |
| Song of the Open Road | 1944 | 17th | 0 | 2 |
| The Adventures of Mark Twain | 1944 | 17th | 0 | 3 |
| Address Unknown | 1944 | 17th | 0 | 2 |
| Dragon Seed | 1944 | 17th | 0 | 2 |
| Higher and Higher | 1944 | 17th | 0 | 2 |
| It Happened Tomorrow | 1944 | 17th | 0 | 2 |
| Lady, Let's Dance | 1944 | 17th | 0 | 2 |
| Minstrel Man | 1944 | 17th | 0 | 2 |
| Mr. Skeffington | 1944 | 17th | 0 | 2 |
| Mrs. Parkington | 1944 | 17th | 0 | 2 |
| The Princess and the Pirate | 1944 | 17th | 0 | 2 |
| Up in Arms | 1944 | 17th | 0 | 2 |
| Voice in the Wind | 1944 | 17th | 0 | 2 |
| A Guy Named Joe | 1943 | 17th | 0 | 1 |
| And to Think I Saw It on Mulberry Street | 1944 | 17th | 0 | 1 |
| Blue Grass Gentlemen | 1944 | 17th | 0 | 1 |
| Bombalera | 1945 | 17th | 0 | 1 |
| Christmas Holiday | 1944 | 17th | 0 | 1 |
| Days of Glory | 1944 | 17th | 0 | 1 |
| Dog, Cat and Canary | 1945 | 17th | 0 | 1 |
| Fish Fry | 1944 | 17th | 0 | 1 |
| Follow the Boys | 1944 | 17th | 0 | 1 |
| Hail the Conquering Hero | 1944 | 17th | 0 | 1 |
| His Butler's Sister | 1943 | 17th | 0 | 1 |
| Home in Indiana | 1944 | 17th | 0 | 1 |
| How to Play Football | 1944 | 17th | 0 | 1 |
| Hymn of the Nations | 1944 | 17th | 0 | 1 |
| Irish Eyes Are Smiling | 1944 | 17th | 0 | 1 |
| Jack London | 1943 | 17th | 0 | 1 |
| Jammin' the Blues | 1944 | 17th | 0 | 1 |
| Janie | 1944 | 17th | 0 | 1 |
| Knickerbocker Holiday | 1944 | 17th | 0 | 1 |
| Main Street Today | 1944 | 17th | 0 | 1 |
| Movie Pests | 1944 | 17th | 0 | 1 |
| Music in Manhattan | 1944 | 17th | 0 | 1 |
| My Boy, Johnny | 1944 | 17th | 0 | 1 |
| New Americans | 1944 | 17th | 0 | 1 |
| No Time for Love | 1943 | 17th | 0 | 1 |
| None Shall Escape | 1944 | 17th | 0 | 1 |
| Resisting Enemy Interrogation | 1944 | 17th | 0 | 1 |
| Screen Snapshots' 50th Anniversary of Motion Pictures | 1944 | 17th | 0 | 1 |
| Secret Command | 1944 | 17th | 0 | 1 |
| Sensations of 1945 | 1944 | 17th | 0 | 1 |
| Step Lively | 1944 | 17th | 0 | 1 |
| Summer Storm | 1944 | 17th | 0 | 1 |
| Sweet and Low-Down | 1944 | 17th | 0 | 1 |
| Swooner Crooner | 1944 | 17th | 0 | 1 |
| The Bridge of San Luis Rey | 1944 | 17th | 0 | 1 |
| The Climax | 1944 | 17th | 0 | 1 |
| The Desert Song | 1943 | 17th | 0 | 1 |
| The Fighting Seabees | 1944 | 17th | 0 | 1 |
| The Hairy Ape | 1944 | 17th | 0 | 1 |
| The Merry Monahans | 1944 | 17th | 0 | 1 |
| The Miracle of Morgan's Creek | 1944 | 17th | 0 | 1 |
| The Seventh Cross | 1944 | 17th | 0 | 1 |
| The Story of Dr. Wassell | 1944 | 17th | 0 | 1 |
| The Fighting Sullivans | 1944 | 17th | 0 | 1 |
| The Uninvited | 1944 | 17th | 0 | 1 |
| The White Cliffs of Dover | 1944 | 17th | 0 | 1 |
| The Woman of the Town | 1943 | 17th | 0 | 1 |
| Three Russian Girls | 1943 | 17th | 0 | 1 |
| Two Girls and a Sailor | 1944 | 17th | 0 | 1 |
| Up in Mabel's Room | 1944 | 17th | 0 | 1 |
| Wing and a Prayer, The Story of Carrier X | 1944 | 17th | 0 | 1 |
| **The Lost Weekend** | 1945 | 18th | 4 | 7 |
| National Velvet | 1944 | 18th | 2 | 5 |
| The Bells of St. Mary's | 1945 | 18th | 1 | 8 |
| Mildred Pierce | 1945 | 18th | 1 | 6 |
| Spellbound | 1945 | 18th | 1 | 6 |
| Anchors Aweigh | 1945 | 18th | 1 | 5 |
| Leave Her to Heaven | 1945 | 18th | 1 | 4 |
| Wonder Man | 1945 | 18th | 1 | 4 |
| The Picture of Dorian Gray | 1945 | 18th | 1 | 3 |
| A Tree Grows in Brooklyn | 1945 | 18th | 1 | 2 |
| State Fair | 1945 | 18th | 1 | 2 |
| Blood on the Sun | 1945 | 18th | 1 | 1 |
| Frenchman's Creek | 1944 | 18th | 1 | 1 |
| Hitler Lives | 1945 | 18th | 1 | 1 |
| Marie-Louise | 1944 | 18th | 1 | 1 |
| Quiet Please! | 1945 | 18th | 1 | 1 |
| Stairway to Light | 1945 | 18th | 1 | 1 |
| Star in the Night | 1945 | 18th | 1 | 1 |
| The House on 92nd Street | 1945 | 18th | 1 | 1 |
| The True Glory | 1945 | 18th | 1 | 1 |
| A Song to Remember | 1945 | 18th | 0 | 6 |
| Love Letters | 1945 | 18th | 0 | 4 |
| The Keys of the Kingdom | 1944 | 18th | 0 | 4 |
| The Story of G.I. Joe | 1945 | 18th | 0 | 4 |
| Objective, Burma! | 1945 | 18th | 0 | 3 |
| The Southerner | 1945 | 18th | 0 | 3 |
| A Medal for Benny | 1945 | 18th | 0 | 2 |
| A Thousand and One Nights | 1945 | 18th | 0 | 2 |
| Belle of the Yukon | 1944 | 18th | 0 | 2 |
| Can't Help Singing | 1944 | 18th | 0 | 2 |
| Flame of Barbary Coast | 1945 | 18th | 0 | 2 |
| Rhapsody in Blue | 1945 | 18th | 0 | 2 |
| San Antonio | 1945 | 18th | 0 | 2 |
| The Corn Is Green | 1945 | 18th | 0 | 2 |
| The Three Caballeros | 1944 | 18th | 0 | 2 |
| The Valley of Decision | 1945 | 18th | 0 | 2 |
| They Were Expendable | 1945 | 18th | 0 | 2 |
| Tonight and Every Night | 1945 | 18th | 0 | 2 |
| Why Girls Leave Home | 1945 | 18th | 0 | 2 |
| A Gun in His Hand | 1945 | 18th | 0 | 1 |
| Along the Rainbow Trail | 1946 | 18th | 0 | 1 |
| Brewster's Millions | 1945 | 18th | 0 | 1 |
| Captain Eddie | 1945 | 18th | 0 | 1 |
| Captain Kidd | 1945 | 18th | 0 | 1 |
| Dillinger | 1945 | 18th | 0 | 1 |
| Donald's Crime | 1945 | 18th | 0 | 1 |
| Earl Carroll Vanities | 1945 | 18th | 0 | 1 |
| Experiment Perilous | 1944 | 18th | 0 | 1 |
| G. I. Honeymoon | 1945 | 18th | 0 | 1 |
| Guest in the House | 1944 | 18th | 0 | 1 |
| Guest Wife | 1945 | 18th | 0 | 1 |
| Here Come the Waves | 1944 | 18th | 0 | 1 |
| Hitchhike to Happiness | 1945 | 18th | 0 | 1 |
| Incendiary Blonde | 1945 | 18th | 0 | 1 |
| Jasper and the Beanstalk | 1945 | 18th | 0 | 1 |
| Lady on a Train | 1945 | 18th | 0 | 1 |
| Library of Congress | 1945 | 18th | 0 | 1 |
| Life with Feathers | 1945 | 18th | 0 | 1 |
| Mighty Mouse in Gypsy Life | 1945 | 18th | 0 | 1 |
| Music for Millions | 1944 | 18th | 0 | 1 |
| Paris Underground | 1945 | 18th | 0 | 1 |
| Pride of the Marines | 1945 | 18th | 0 | 1 |
| Rippling Romance | 1945 | 18th | 0 | 1 |
| Salty O'Rourke | 1945 | 18th | 0 | 1 |
| Screen Snapshots' 25th Anniversary | 1945 | 18th | 0 | 1 |
| Sing Your Way Home | 1945 | 18th | 0 | 1 |
| Story of a Dog | 1945 | 18th | 0 | 1 |
| Sunbonnet Sue | 1945 | 18th | 0 | 1 |
| The Affairs of Susan | 1945 | 18th | 0 | 1 |
| The Enchanted Cottage | 1945 | 18th | 0 | 1 |
| The Jury Goes Round 'N' Round | 1945 | 18th | 0 | 1 |
| The Last Bomb | 1945 | 18th | 0 | 1 |
| The Little Witch | 1945 | 18th | 0 | 1 |
| The Man Who Walked Alone | 1945 | 18th | 0 | 1 |
| The Poet and the Peasant | 1945 | 18th | 0 | 1 |
| The Spanish Main | 1945 | 18th | 0 | 1 |
| The Unseen | 1945 | 18th | 0 | 1 |
| The Woman in the Window | 1944 | 18th | 0 | 1 |
| This Love of Ours | 1945 | 18th | 0 | 1 |
| Three Is a Family | 1944 | 18th | 0 | 1 |
| To the Shores of Iwo Jima | 1945 | 18th | 0 | 1 |
| What Next, Corporal Hargrove? | 1945 | 18th | 0 | 1 |
| White Rhapsody | 1945 | 18th | 0 | 1 |
| Your National Gallery | 1945 | 18th | 0 | 1 |
| The House I Live In | 1945 | 18th | 0 (1) | 0 |
| **The Best Years of Our Lives** | 1946 | 19th | 7 (1) | 8 |
| The Yearling | 1946 | 19th | 2 | 7 |
| The Jolson Story | 1946 | 19th | 2 | 6 |
| Anna and the King of Siam | 1946 | 19th | 2 | 5 |
| The Razor's Edge | 1946 | 19th | 1 | 4 |
| The Harvey Girls | 1946 | 19th | 1 | 2 |
| To Each His Own | 1946 | 19th | 1 | 2 |
| A Boy and His Dog | 1946 | 19th | 1 | 1 |
| Blithe Spirit | 1945 | 19th | 1 | 1 |
| Facing Your Danger | 1946 | 19th | 1 | 1 |
| Seeds of Destiny | 1946 | 19th | 1 | 1 |
| The Cat Concerto | 1947 | 19th | 1 | 1 |
| The Seventh Veil | 1945 | 19th | 1 | 1 |
| Vacation From Marriage | 1945 | 19th | 1 | 1 |
| It's a Wonderful Life | 1946 | 19th | 0 | 5 |
| Henry V | 1944 | 19th | 0 (1) | 4 |
| The Killers | 1946 | 19th | 0 | 4 |
| Brief Encounter | 1945 | 19th | 0 | 3 |
| Blue Skies | 1946 | 19th | 0 | 2 |
| Centennial Summer | 1946 | 19th | 0 | 2 |
| Duel in the Sun | 1946 | 19th | 0 | 2 |
| Notorious | 1946 | 19th | 0 | 2 |
| The Green Years | 1946 | 19th | 0 | 2 |
| A Stolen Life | 1946 | 19th | 0 | 1 |
| Atomic Power | 1946 | 19th | 0 | 1 |
| Caesar and Cleopatra | 1945 | 19th | 0 | 1 |
| Canyon Passage | 1946 | 19th | 0 | 1 |
| Children of Paradise | 1945 | 19th | 0 | 1 |
| College Queen | 1946 | 19th | 0 | 1 |
| Dive-Hi Champs | 1946 | 19th | 0 | 1 |
| Golden Horses | 1946 | 19th | 0 | 1 |
| Hiss and Yell | 1946 | 19th | 0 | 1 |
| Humoresque | 1946 | 19th | 0 | 1 |
| John Henry and the Inky-Poo | 1946 | 19th | 0 | 1 |
| Kitty | 1945 | 19th | 0 | 1 |
| Life at the Zoo | 1946 | 19th | 0 | 1 |
| Musical Moments from Chopin | 1947 | 19th | 0 | 1 |
| Night and Day | 1946 | 19th | 0 | 1 |
| Paramount News Issue # 37 | 1946 | 19th | 0 | 1 |
| Road to Utopia | 1946 | 19th | 0 | 1 |
| Rome, Open City | 1945 | 19th | 0 | 1 |
| Saratoga Trunk | 1945 | 19th | 0 | 1 |
| Sister Kenny | 1946 | 19th | 0 | 1 |
| Smart as a Fox | 1946 | 19th | 0 | 1 |
| Squatter's Rights | 1946 | 19th | 0 | 1 |
| Sure Cures | 1946 | 19th | 0 | 1 |
| The Blue Dahlia | 1946 | 19th | 0 | 1 |
| The Dark Mirror | 1946 | 19th | 0 | 1 |
| The Dolly Sisters | 1945 | 19th | 0 | 1 |
| The Luckiest Guy in the World | 1947 | 19th | 0 | 1 |
| The Spiral Staircase | 1946 | 19th | 0 | 1 |
| The Strange Love of Martha Ivers | 1946 | 19th | 0 | 1 |
| The Stranger | 1946 | 19th | 0 | 1 |
| Traffic with the Devil | 1946 | 19th | 0 | 1 |
| Walky Talky Hawky | 1946 | 19th | 0 | 1 |
| Three Little Girls in Blue | 1946 | 19th | 0 | 0 |
| **Gentleman's Agreement** | 1947 | 20th | 3 | 8 |
| Miracle on 34th Street | 1947 | 20th | 3 | 4 |
| Great Expectations | 1946 | 20th | 2 | 5 |
| A Double Life | 1947 | 20th | 2 | 4 |
| Black Narcissus | 1947 | 20th | 2 | 2 |
| The Bishop's Wife | 1947 | 20th | 1 | 5 |
| Green Dolphin Street | 1947 | 20th | 1 | 4 |
| Body and Soul | 1947 | 20th | 1 | 3 |
| Mother Wore Tights | 1947 | 20th | 1 | 3 |
| Song of the South | 1946 | 20th | 1 (1) | 2 |
| The Farmer's Daughter | 1947 | 20th | 1 | 2 |
| Climbing the Matterhorn | 1947 | 20th | 1 | 1 |
| Design for Death | 1947 | 20th | 1 | 1 |
| First Steps | 1947 | 20th | 1 | 1 |
| Goodbye, Miss Turlock | 1948 | 20th | 1 | 1 |
| The Bachelor and the Bobby-Soxer | 1947 | 20th | 1 | 1 |
| Tweetie Pie | 1947 | 20th | 1 | 1 |
| Crossfire | 1947 | 20th | 0 | 5 |
| Life with Father | 1947 | 20th | 0 | 4 |
| Kiss of Death | 1947 | 20th | 0 | 2 |
| Mourning Becomes Electra | 1947 | 20th | 0 | 2 |
| Smash-Up, the Story of a Woman | 1947 | 20th | 0 | 2 |
| A Cage of Nightingales | 1945 | 20th | 0 | 1 |
| A Voice Is Born: The Story of Niklos Gafni | 1947 | 20th | 0 | 1 |
| Boomerang! | 1947 | 20th | 0 | 1 |
| Brooklyn, U.S.A. | 1947 | 20th | 0 | 1 |
| Captain from Castile | 1947 | 20th | 0 | 1 |
| Champagne for Two | 1947 | 20th | 0 | 1 |
| Chip an' Dale | 1947 | 20th | 0 | 1 |
| Dr. Jekyll and Mr. Mouse | 1947 | 20th | 0 | 1 |
| Fiesta | 1947 | 20th | 0 | 1 |
| Fight of the Wild Stallions | 1947 | 20th | 0 | 1 |
| Forever Amber | 1947 | 20th | 0 | 1 |
| Give Us the Earth | 1947 | 20th | 0 | 1 |
| Good News | 1947 | 20th | 0 | 1 |
| It Happened on 5th Avenue | 1947 | 20th | 0 | 1 |
| Journey into Medicine | 1947 | 20th | 0 | 1 |
| Monsieur Verdoux | 1947 | 20th | 0 | 1 |
| Moon Rockets | 1947 | 20th | 0 | 1 |
| My Wild Irish Rose | 1947 | 20th | 0 | 1 |
| Now You See It | 1947 | 20th | 0 | 1 |
| Odd Man Out | 1947 | 20th | 0 | 1 |
| Passport to Nowhere | 1947 | 20th | 0 | 1 |
| Pluto's Blue Note | 1947 | 20th | 0 | 1 |
| Possessed | 1947 | 20th | 0 | 1 |
| Ride the Pink Horse | 1947 | 20th | 0 | 1 |
| Road to Rio | 1947 | 20th | 0 | 1 |
| School in the Mailbox | 1947 | 20th | 0 | 1 |
| Shoeshine | 1946 | 20th | 0 (1) | 1 |
| So You Want to Be in Pictures | 1947 | 20th | 0 | 1 |
| T-Men | 1947 | 20th | 0 | 1 |
| The Egg and I | 1947 | 20th | 0 | 1 |
| The Foxes of Harrow | 1947 | 20th | 0 | 1 |
| The Ghost and Mrs. Muir | 1947 | 20th | 0 | 1 |
| The Paradine Case | 1947 | 20th | 0 | 1 |
| The Perils of Pauline | 1947 | 20th | 0 | 1 |
| The Time, the Place and the Girl | 1946 | 20th | 0 | 1 |
| The World Is Rich | 1947 | 20th | 0 | 1 |
| Tubby the Tuba | 1947 | 20th | 0 | 1 |
| Unconquered | 1947 | 20th | 0 | 1 |
| Bill and Coo | 1948 | 20th | 0 (1) | 0 |
| **Hamlet** | 1948 | 21st | 4 | 7 |
| The Treasure of the Sierra Madre | 1948 | 21st | 3 | 4 |
| Joan of Arc | 1948 | 21st | 2 (1) | 7 |
| The Red Shoes | 1948 | 21st | 2 | 5 |
| The Naked City | 1948 | 21st | 2 | 3 |
| Johnny Belinda | 1948 | 21st | 1 | 12 |
| The Snake Pit | 1948 | 21st | 1 | 6 |
| The Search | 1948 | 21st | 1 (1) | 4 |
| Portrait of Jennie | 1948 | 21st | 1 | 2 |
| Easter Parade | 1948 | 21st | 1 | 1 |
| Key Largo | 1948 | 21st | 1 | 1 |
| Seal Island | 1948 | 21st | 1 | 1 |
| Symphony of a City | 1947 | 21st | 1 | 1 |
| The Little Orphan | 1949 | 21st | 1 | 1 |
| The Paleface | 1948 | 21st | 1 | 1 |
| The Secret Land | 1948 | 21st | 1 | 1 |
| Toward Independence | 1948 | 21st | 1 | 1 |
| I Remember Mama | 1948 | 21st | 0 | 5 |
| A Foreign Affair | 1948 | 21st | 0 | 2 |
| Red River | 1948 | 21st | 0 | 2 |
| Romance on the High Seas | 1948 | 21st | 0 | 2 |
| The Emperor Waltz | 1948 | 21st | 0 | 2 |
| When My Baby Smiles at Me | 1948 | 21st | 0 | 2 |
| Annie Was a Wonder | 1949 | 21st | 0 | 1 |
| B.F.'s Daughter | 1948 | 21st | 0 | 1 |
| Calgary Stampede | 1948 | 21st | 0 | 1 |
| Casbah | 1948 | 21st | 0 | 1 |
| Cinderella Horse | 1948 | 21st | 0 | 1 |
| Deep Waters | 1948 | 21st | 0 | 1 |
| Going to Blazes | 1948 | 21st | 0 | 1 |
| Green Grass of Wyoming | 1948 | 21st | 0 | 1 |
| Heart to Heart | 1949 | 21st | 0 | 1 |
| Louisiana Story | 1948 | 21st | 0 | 1 |
| Mickey and the Seal | 1948 | 21st | 0 | 1 |
| Moonrise | 1948 | 21st | 0 | 1 |
| Mouse Wreckers | 1949 | 21st | 0 | 1 |
| Operation Vittles | 1948 | 21st | 0 | 1 |
| Robin Hoodlum | 1948 | 21st | 0 | 1 |
| Samba-Mania | 1948 | 21st | 0 | 1 |
| Sitting Pretty | 1948 | 21st | 0 | 1 |
| Snow Capers | 1948 | 21st | 0 | 1 |
| So You Want to Be on the Radio | 1948 | 21st | 0 | 1 |
| Sorry, Wrong Number | 1948 | 21st | 0 | 1 |
| Tea for Two Hundred | 1948 | 21st | 0 | 1 |
| That Lady in Ermine | 1948 | 21st | 0 | 1 |
| The Loves of Carmen | 1948 | 21st | 0 | 1 |
| The Luck of the Irish | 1948 | 21st | 0 | 1 |
| The Pirate | 1948 | 21st | 0 | 1 |
| The Quiet One | 1948 | 21st / 22nd | 0 | 2 |
| The Three Musketeers | 1948 | 21st | 0 | 1 |
| Wet Blanket Policy | 1948 | 21st | 0 | 1 |
| You Can't Win | 1948 | 21st | 0 | 1 |
| Monsieur Vincent | 1947 | 21st | 0 (1) | 0 |
| **All the King's Men** | 1949 | 22nd | 3 | 7 |
| The Heiress | 1949 | 22nd | 4 | 8 |
| Battleground | 1949 | 22nd | 2 | 6 |
| Twelve O'Clock High | 1949 | 22nd | 2 | 4 |
| A Letter to Three Wives | 1949 | 22nd | 2 | 3 |
| Champion | 1949 | 22nd | 1 | 6 |
| Adventures of Don Juan | 1948 | 22nd | 1 | 2 |
| Little Women | 1949 | 22nd | 1 | 2 |
| A Chance to Live | 1949 | 22nd | 1 | 1 |
| Aquatic House Party | 1950 | 22nd | 1 | 1 |
| Daybreak in Udi | 1949 | 22nd | 1 | 1 |
| For Scent-imental Reasons | 1949 | 22nd | 1 | 1 |
| Mighty Joe Young | 1949 | 22nd | 1 | 1 |
| Neptune's Daughter | 1949 | 22nd | 1 | 1 |
| On the Town | 1949 | 22nd | 1 | 1 |
| She Wore a Yellow Ribbon | 1949 | 22nd | 1 | 1 |
| So Much for So Little | 1949 | 22nd | 1 | 1 |
| The Stratton Story | 1949 | 22nd | 1 | 1 |
| Van Gogh | 1948 | 22nd | 1 | 1 |
| Come to the Stable | 1949 | 22nd | 0 | 7 |
| Sands of Iwo Jima | 1949 | 22nd | 0 | 4 |
| Jolson Sings Again | 1949 | 22nd | 0 | 3 |
| Pinky | 1949 | 22nd | 0 | 3 |
| My Foolish Heart | 1949 | 22nd | 0 | 2 |
| Prince of Foxes | 1949 | 22nd | 0 | 2 |
| The Fallen Idol | 1948 | 22nd | 0 | 2 |
| 1848 | 1949 | 22nd | 0 | 1 |
| Beyond the Forest | 1949 | 22nd | 0 | 1 |
| Bicycle Thieves | 1948 | 22nd | 0 (1) | 1 |
| Canary Row | 1950 | 22nd | 0 | 0 |
| Chase of Death | 1949 | 22nd | 0 | 1 |
| Edward, My Son | 1949 | 22nd | 0 | 1 |
| Hatch Up Your Troubles | 1949 | 22nd | 0 | 1 |
| It Happens Every Spring | 1949 | 22nd | 0 | 1 |
| It's a Great Feeling | 1949 | 22nd | 0 | 1 |
| Kenji Comes Home | 1949 | 22nd | 0 | 1 |
| Look for the Silver Lining | 1949 | 22nd | 0 | 1 |
| Madame Bovary | 1949 | 22nd | 0 | 1 |
| Mother Is a Freshman | 1949 | 22nd | 0 | 1 |
| Once More, My Darling | 1949 | 22nd | 0 | 1 |
| Paisan | 1946 | 22nd | 0 | 1 |
| Passport to Pimlico | 1949 | 22nd | 0 | 1 |
| Roller Derby Girl | 1949 | 22nd | 0 | 1 |
| Sand | 1949 | 22nd | 0 | 1 |
| Saraband for Dead Lovers | 1948 | 22nd | 0 | 1 |
| Snow Carnival | 1949 | 22nd | 0 | 1 |
| So Dear to My Heart | 1948 | 22nd | 0 | 1 |
| So You Think You're Not Guilty | 1950 | 22nd | 0 | 1 |
| Spills and Chills | 1949 | 22nd | 0 | 1 |
| The Barkleys of Broadway | 1949 | 22nd | 0 | 1 |
| The Boy and the Eagle | 1949 | 22nd | 0 | 1 |
| The Grass Is Always Greener | 1950 | 22nd | 0 | 1 |
| The Hasty Heart | 1949 | 22nd | 0 | 1 |
| The Magic Fluke | 1949 | 22nd | 0 | 1 |
| The Rising Tide | 1949 | 22nd | 0 | 1 |
| The Window | 1949 | 22nd | 0 | 1 |
| Toy Tinkers | 1949 | 22nd | 0 | 1 |
| Tulsa | 1949 | 22nd | 0 | 1 |
| Water Trix | 1949 | 22nd | 0 | 1 |
| White Heat | 1949 | 22nd | 0 | 1 |
| **All About Eve** | 1950 | 23rd | 6 | 14 |
| Sunset Boulevard | 1950 | 23rd | 3 | 11 |
| Samson and Delilah | 1949 | 23rd | 2 | 5 |
| King Solomon's Mines | 1950 | 23rd | 2 | 3 |
| Born Yesterday | 1950 | 23rd | 1 | 5 |
| Annie Get Your Gun | 1950 | 23rd | 1 | 4 |
| The Third Man | 1949 | 23rd | 1 | 3 |
| Destination Moon | 1950 | 23rd | 1 | 2 |
| Harvey | 1950 | 23rd | 1 | 2 |
| Captain Carey, U.S.A. | 1950 | 23rd | 1 | 1 |
| Cyrano de Bergerac | 1950 | 23rd | 1 | 1 |
| Gerald McBoing-Boing | 1950 | 23rd | 1 | 1 |
| Grandad of Races | 1950 | 23rd | 1 | 1 |
| In Beaver Valley | 1950 | 23rd | 1 | 1 |
| Panic in the Streets | 1950 | 23rd | 1 | 1 |
| The Titan: Story of Michelangelo | 1950 | 23rd | 1 | 1 |
| Why Korea? | 1950 | 23rd | 1 | 1 |
| The Asphalt Jungle | 1950 | 23rd | 0 | 4 |
| Broken Arrow | 1950 | 23rd | 0 | 3 |
| Caged | 1950 | 23rd | 0 | 3 |
| Cinderella | 1950 | 23rd | 0 | 3 |
| Father of the Bride | 1950 | 23rd | 0 | 3 |
| The Flame and the Arrow | 1950 | 23rd | 0 | 2 |
| The Magnificent Yankee | 1950 | 23rd | 0 | 2 |
| Adam's Rib | 1949 | 23rd | 0 | 1 |
| Bitter Rice | 1949 | 23rd | 0 | 1 |
| Blaze Busters | 1950 | 23rd | 0 | 1 |
| Grandma Moses | 1950 | 23rd | 0 | 1 |
| I'll Get By | 1950 | 23rd | 0 | 1 |
| Jerry's Cousin | 1951 | 23rd | 0 | 1 |
| Louisa | 1950 | 23rd | 0 | 1 |
| Mister 880 | 1950 | 23rd | 0 | 1 |
| My Country 'Tis of Thee | 1950 | 23rd | 0 | 1 |
| Mystery Street | 1950 | 23rd | 0 | 1 |
| No Sad Songs for Me | 1950 | 23rd | 0 | 1 |
| No Way Out | 1950 | 23rd | 0 | 1 |
| Our Very Own | 1950 | 23rd | 0 | 1 |
| Singing Guns | 1950 | 23rd | 0 | 1 |
| That Forsyte Woman | 1949 | 23rd | 0 | 1 |
| The Black Rose | 1950 | 23rd | 0 | 1 |
| The Fight: Science Against Cancer | 1950 | 23rd | 0 | 1 |
| The Furies | 1950 | 23rd | 0 | 1 |
| The Gunfighter | 1950 | 23rd | 0 | 1 |
| The Men | 1950 | 23rd | 0 | 1 |
| The Red Danube | 1949 | 23rd | 0 | 1 |
| The Stairs | 1950 | 23rd | 0 | 1 |
| The Toast of New Orleans | 1950 | 23rd | 0 | 1 |
| The West Point Story | 1950 | 23rd | 0 | 1 |
| Three Little Words | 1950 | 23rd | 0 | 1 |
| Trio | 1950 | 23rd | 0 | 1 |
| Trouble Indemnity | 1950 | 23rd | 0 | 1 |
| Wabash Avenue | 1950 | 23rd | 0 | 1 |
| When Willie Comes Marching Home | 1950 | 23rd | 0 | 1 |
| With These Hands | 1950 | 23rd | 0 | 1 |
| Wrong Way Butch | 1950 | 23rd | 0 | 1 |
| The Walls of Malapaga | 1949 | 23rd | 0 (1) | 0 |
| **An American in Paris** | 1951 | 24th | 6 | 8 |
| A Place in the Sun | 1951 | 24th | 6 | 9 |
| A Streetcar Named Desire | 1951 | 24th | 4 | 12 |
| The African Queen | 1951 | 24th | 1 | 4 |
| The Great Caruso | 1951 | 24th | 1 | 3 |
| Here Comes the Groom | 1951 | 24th | 1 | 2 |
| Benjy | 1951 | 24th | 1 | 1 |
| Kon-Tiki | 1950 | 24th | 1 | 1 |
| Nature's Half Acre | 1951 | 24th | 1 | 1 |
| Seven Days to Noon | 1950 | 24th | 1 | 1 |
| The Two Mouseketeers | 1952 | 24th | 1 | 1 |
| World of Kids | 1951 | 24th | 1 | 1 |
| Quo Vadis | 1951 | 24th | 0 | 8 |
| David and Bathsheba | 1951 | 24th | 0 | 5 |
| Death of a Salesman | 1951 | 24th | 0 | 5 |
| Detective Story | 1951 | 24th | 0 | 4 |
| Bright Victory | 1951 | 24th | 0 | 2 |
| Decision Before Dawn | 1951 | 24th | 0 | 2 |
| La Ronde | 1950 | 24th | 0 | 2 |
| On the Riviera | 1951 | 24th | 0 | 2 |
| Show Boat | 1951 | 24th | 0 | 2 |
| The Tales of Hoffmann | 1951 | 24th | 0 | 2 |
| The Blue Veil | 1951 | 24th | 0 | 2 |
| The Frogmen | 1951 | 24th | 0 | 2 |
| The Well | 1951 | 24th | 0 | 2 |
| Ace in the Hole | 1951 | 24th | 0 | 1 |
| Alice in Wonderland | 1951 | 24th | 0 | 1 |
| Balzac | 1951 | 24th | 0 | 1 |
| Bullfighter and the Lady | 1951 | 24th | 0 | 1 |
| Come Fill the Cup | 1951 | 24th | 0 | 1 |
| Danger Under the Sea | 1951 | 24th | 0 | 1 |
| Fourteen Hours | 1951 | 24th | 0 | 1 |
| Go for Broke! | 1951 | 24th | 0 | 1 |
| Golden Girl | 1951 | 24th | 0 | 1 |
| I Want You | 1951 | 24th | 0 | 1 |
| I Was a Communist for the FBI | 1951 | 24th | 0 | 1 |
| Kind Lady | 1951 | 24th | 0 | 1 |
| Lambert the Sheepish Lion | 1952 | 24th | 0 | 1 |
| One Who Came Back | 1951 | 24th | 0 | 1 |
| Rich, Young and Pretty | 1951 | 24th | 0 | 1 |
| Ridin' the Rails | 1951 | 24th | 0 | 1 |
| Rooty Toot Toot | 1951 | 24th | 0 | 1 |
| Royal Wedding | 1951 | 24th | 0 | 1 |
| Strangers on a Train | 1951 | 24th | 0 | 1 |
| Teresa | 1951 | 24th | 0 | 1 |
| The House on Telegraph Hill | 1951 | 24th | 0 | 1 |
| The Mating Season | 1951 | 24th | 0 | 1 |
| The Model and the Marriage Broker | 1951 | 24th | 0 | 1 |
| The Mudlark | 1950 | 24th | 0 | 1 |
| The Seeing Eye | 1951 | 24th | 0 | 1 |
| The Story of Time | 1951 | 24th | 0 | 1 |
| The Strip | 1951 | 24th | 0 | 1 |
| Too Young to Kiss | 1951 | 24th | 0 | 1 |
| Two Tickets to Broadway | 1951 | 24th | 0 | 1 |
| When Worlds Collide | 1951 | 24th | 0 (1) | 1 |
| **The Greatest Show on Earth** | 1952 | 25th | 2 | 5 |
| The Bad and the Beautiful | 1952 | 25th | 5 | 6 |
| High Noon | 1952 | 25th | 4 | 7 |
| Moulin Rouge | 1952 | 25th | 2 | 7 |
| The Quiet Man | 1952 | 25th | 2 | 7 |
| Viva Zapata! | 1952 | 25th | 1 | 5 |
| With a Song in My Heart | 1952 | 25th | 1 | 5 |
| Come Back, Little Sheba | 1952 | 25th | 1 | 3 |
| Breaking the Sound Barrier | 1952 | 25th | 1 | 2 |
| Neighbours | 1952 | 25th | 1 | 2 |
| The Lavender Hill Mob | 1951 | 25th | 1 | 2 |
| Johann Mouse | 1953 | 25th | 1 | 1 |
| Light in the Window | 1952 | 25th | 1 | 1 |
| Plymouth Adventure | 1952 | 25th | 1 | 1 |
| The Sea Around Us | 1953 | 25th | 1 | 1 |
| Water Birds | 1952 | 25th | 1 | 1 |
| Hans Christian Andersen | 1952 | 25th | 0 | 6 |
| My Cousin Rachel | 1952 | 25th | 0 | 4 |
| Sudden Fear | 1952 | 25th | 0 | 4 |
| Ivanhoe | 1952 | 25th | 0 | 3 |
| Carrie | 1952 | 25th | 0 | 2 |
| Devil Take Us | 1952 | 25th | 0 | 2 |
| 5 Fingers | 1952 | 25th | 0 | 2 |
| Navajo | 1952 | 25th | 0 | 2 |
| Singin' in the Rain | 1952 | 25th | 0 | 2 |
| The Big Sky | 1952 | 25th | 0 | 2 |
| The Merry Widow | 1952 | 25th | 0 | 2 |
| The Snows of Kilimanjaro | 1952 | 25th | 0 | 2 |
| Affair in Trinidad | 1952 | 25th | 0 | 1 |
| Athletes of the Saddle | 1952 | 25th | 0 | 1 |
| Because You're Mine | 1952 | 25th | 0 | 1 |
| Bridge of Time | 1950 | 25th | 0 | 1 |
| Desert Killer | 1952 | 25th | 0 | 1 |
| Flat Top | 1952 | 25th | 0 | 1 |
| Just for You | 1952 | 25th | 0 | 1 |
| Little Johnny Jet | 1953 | 25th | 0 | 1 |
| Madeline | 1952 | 25th | 0 | 1 |
| Man Alive! | 1952 | 25th | 0 | 1 |
| Million Dollar Mermaid | 1952 | 25th | 0 | 1 |
| My Son John | 1952 | 25th | 0 | 1 |
| Pat and Mike | 1952 | 25th | 0 | 1 |
| Pink and Blue Blues | 1952 | 25th | 0 | 1 |
| Rashomon | 1950 | 24th / 25th | 0 (1) | 1 |
| Royal Scotland | 1952 | 25th | 0 | 1 |
| Son of Paleface | 1952 | 25th | 0 | 1 |
| Thar She Blows! | 1952 | 25th | 0 | 1 |
| The Atomic City | 1952 | 25th | 0 | 1 |
| The Card | 1952 | 25th | 0 | 1 |
| The Garden Spider | 1952 | 25th | 0 | 1 |
| The Hoaxters | 1952 | 25th | 0 | 1 |
| The Jazz Singer | 1952 | 25th | 0 | 1 |
| The Man in the White Suit | 1951 | 25th | 0 | 1 |
| The Medium | 1951 | 25th | 0 | 1 |
| The Member of the Wedding | 1952 | 25th | 0 | 1 |
| The Miracle of Our Lady of Fatima | 1952 | 25th | 0 | 1 |
| The Narrow Margin | 1952 | 25th | 0 | 1 |
| The Pride of St. Louis | 1952 | 25th | 0 | 1 |
| The Romance of Transportation in Canada | 1952 | 25th | 0 | 1 |
| The Sniper | 1952 | 25th | 0 | 1 |
| The Star | 1952 | 25th | 0 | 1 |
| The Thief | 1952 | 25th | 0 | 1 |
| **From Here to Eternity** | 1953 | 26th | 8 | 13 |
| Roman Holiday | 1953 | 26th | 3 | 10 |
| The Robe | 1953 | 26th | 2 | 5 |
| Lili | 1953 | 26th | 1 | 6 |
| Shane | 1953 | 26th | 1 | 6 |
| Julius Caesar | 1953 | 26th | 1 | 5 |
| Calamity Jane | 1953 | 26th | 1 | 3 |
| Stalag 17 | 1953 | 26th | 1 | 3 |
| The War of the Worlds | 1953 | 26th | 1 | 3 |
| Call Me Madam | 1953 | 26th | 1 | 2 |
| Titanic | 1953 | 26th | 1 | 2 |
| Bear Country | 1953 | 26th | 1 | 1 |
| Overture to The Merry Wives of Windsor | 1953 | 26th | 1 | 1 |
| The Alaskan Eskimo | 1953 | 26th | 1 | 1 |
| The Living Desert | 1953 | 26th | 1 | 1 |
| Toot, Whistle, Plunk and Boom | 1953 | 26th | 1 | 1 |
| The Band Wagon | 1953 | 26th | 0 | 3 |
| The Moon Is Blue | 1953 | 26th | 0 | 3 |
| Above and Beyond | 1952 | 26th | 0 | 2 |
| Hondo | 1953 | 26th | 0 | 1 |
| Knights of the Round Table | 1953 | 26th | 0 | 2 |
| Martin Luther | 1953 | 26th | 0 | 2 |
| Mogambo | 1953 | 26th | 0 | 2 |
| The President's Lady | 1953 | 26th | 0 | 2 |
| Young Bess | 1953 | 26th | 0 | 2 |
| A Queen Is Crowned | 1953 | 26th | 0 | 1 |
| All the Brothers Were Valiant | 1953 | 26th | 0 | 1 |
| Ben and Me | 1953 | 26th | 0 | 1 |
| Beneath the 12-Mile Reef | 1953 | 26th | 0 | 1 |
| Christ Among the Primitives | 1953 | 26th | 0 | 1 |
| Christopher Crumpet | 1953 | 26th | 0 | 1 |
| Crazylegs | 1953 | 26th | 0 | 1 |
| Dream Wife | 1953 | 26th | 0 | 1 |
| From A to Z-Z-Z-Z | 1954 | 26th | 0 | 1 |
| Herring Hunt | 1953 | 26th | 0 | 1 |
| How to Marry a Millionaire | 1953 | 26th | 0 | 1 |
| Joy of Living | 1952 | 26th | 0 | 1 |
| Kiss Me Kate | 1953 | 26th | 0 | 1 |
| Little Fugitive | 1953 | 26th | 0 | 1 |
| Miss Sadie Thompson | 1953 | 26th | 0 | 1 |
| Operation Blue Jay | 1953 | 26th | 0 | 1 |
| Pickup on South Street | 1953 | 26th | 0 | 1 |
| Return to Glennascaul | 1951 | 26th | 0 | 1 |
| Rugged Bear | 1953 | 26th | 0 | 1 |
| Small Town Girl | 1953 | 26th | 0 | 1 |
| Take the High Ground! | 1953 | 26th | 0 | 1 |
| The 5,000 Fingers of Dr. T. | 1953 | 26th | 0 | 1 |
| The Actress | 1953 | 26th | 0 | 1 |
| The Caddy | 1953 | 26th | 0 | 1 |
| The Captain's Paradise | 1953 | 26th | 0 | 1 |
| The Conquest of Everest | 1953 | 26th | 0 | 1 |
| The Cruel Sea | 1953 | 26th | 0 | 1 |
| The Desert Rats | 1953 | 26th | 0 | 1 |
| The Four Poster | 1952 | 26th | 0 | 1 |
| The Living City | 1953 | 26th | 0 | 1 |
| The Mississippi Gambler | 1953 | 26th | 0 | 1 |
| The Naked Spur | 1953 | 26th | 0 | 1 |
| The Story of Three Loves | 1953 | 26th | 0 | 1 |
| The Tell-Tale Heart | 1953 | 26th | 0 | 1 |
| The Word | 1953 | 26th | 0 | 1 |
| They Planted a Stone | 1953 | 26th | 0 | 1 |
| This Is Cinerama | 1952 | 26th | 0 | 1 |
| Torch Song | 1953 | 26th | 0 | 1 |
| Vesuvius Express | 1953 | 26th | 0 | 1 |
| Wee Water Wonders | 1953 | 26th | 0 | 1 |
| Winter Paradise | 1953 | 26th | 0 | 1 |
| **On the Waterfront** | 1954 | 27th | 8 | 12 |
| The Country Girl | 1954 | 27th | 2 | 7 |
| 20,000 Leagues Under the Sea | 1954 | 27th | 2 | 3 |
| Three Coins in the Fountain | 1954 | 27th | 2 | 3 |
| Sabrina | 1954 | 27th | 1 | 6 |
| The High and the Mighty | 1954 | 27th | 1 | 6 |
| Seven Brides for Seven Brothers | 1954 | 27th | 1 | 5 |
| The Glenn Miller Story | 1954 | 27th | 1 | 3 |
| Broken Lance | 1954 | 27th | 1 | 2 |
| The Barefoot Contessa | 1954 | 27th | 1 | 2 |
| A Time Out of War | 1954 | 27th | 1 | 1 |
| Gate of Hell | 1953 | 27th | 1 (1) | 1 |
| This Mechanical Age | 1954 | 27th | 1 | 1 |
| The Vanishing Prairie | 1954 | 27th | 1 | 1 |
| Thursday's Children | 1954 | 27th | 1 | 1 |
| When Magoo Flew | 1954 | 27th | 1 | 1 |
| The Caine Mutiny | 1954 | 27th | 0 | 7 |
| A Star Is Born | 1954 | 27th | 0 | 6 |
| Executive Suite | 1954 | 27th | 0 | 4 |
| Rear Window | 1954 | 27th | 0 | 4 |
| Brigadoon | 1954 | 27th | 0 | 3 |
| There's No Business Like Show Business | 1954 | 27th | 0 | 3 |
| Carmen Jones | 1954 | 27th | 0 | 2 |
| Désirée | 1954 | 27th | 0 | 2 |
| Genevieve | 1953 | 27th | 0 | 2 |
| Jet Carrier | 1954 | 27th | 0 | 2 |
| Susan Slept Here | 1954 | 27th | 0 | 2 |
| The Silver Chalice | 1954 | 27th | 0 | 2 |
| Beauty and the Bull | 1954 | 27th | 0 | 1 |
| Bread, Love and Dreams | 1953 | 27th | 0 | 1 |
| Crazy Mixed Up Pup | 1955 | 27th | 0 | 1 |
| Forbidden Games | 1952 | 25th / 27th | 0 (1) | 1 |
| Hell and High Water | 1954 | 27th | 0 | 1 |
| Indiscretion of an American Wife | 1953 | 27th | 0 | 1 |
| It Should Happen to You | 1954 | 27th | 0 | 1 |
| Knock on Wood | 1954 | 27th | 0 | 1 |
| Le Plaisir | 1952 | 27th | 0 | 1 |
| Magnificent Obsession | 1954 | 27th | 0 | 1 |
| Night People | 1954 | 27th | 0 | 1 |
| Pigs Is Pigs | 1954 | 27th | 0 | 1 |
| Red Garters | 1954 | 27th | 0 | 1 |
| Rembrandt: A Self-Portrait | 1954 | 27th | 0 | 1 |
| Robinson Crusoe | 1954 | 27th | 0 | 1 |
| Rogue Cop | 1954 | 27th | 0 | 1 |
| Sandy Claws | 1954 | 27th | 0 | 1 |
| Siam | 1954 | 27th | 0 | 1 |
| The Earrings of Madame de... | 1953 | 27th | 0 | 1 |
| The Egyptian | 1954 | 27th | 0 | 1 |
| The First Piano Quartette | 1954 | 27th | 0 | 1 |
| The Stratford Adventure | 1954 | 27th | 0 | 1 |
| The Strauss Fantasy | 1954 | 27th | 0 | 1 |
| Them! | 1954 | 27th | 0 | 1 |
| Touché, Pussy Cat! | 1954 | 27th | 0 | 1 |
| White Christmas | 1954 | 27th | 0 | 1 |
| The Little Kidnappers | 1953 | 27th | 0 (2) | 0 |
| **Marty** | 1955 | 28th | 4 | 8 |
| Love Is a Many-Splendored Thing | 1955 | 28th | 3 | 8 |
| The Rose Tattoo | 1955 | 28th | 3 | 8 |
| Picnic | 1955 | 28th | 2 | 6 |
| Oklahoma! | 1955 | 28th | 2 | 4 |
| Love Me or Leave Me | 1955 | 28th | 1 | 6 |
| East of Eden | 1955 | 28th | 1 | 4 |
| I'll Cry Tomorrow | 1955 | 28th | 1 | 4 |
| Interrupted Melody | 1955 | 28th | 1 | 3 |
| Mister Roberts | 1955 | 28th | 1 | 3 |
| To Catch a Thief | 1955 | 28th | 1 | 3 |
| The Bridges at Toko-Ri | 1954 | 28th | 1 | 2 |
| The Face of Lincoln | 1955 | 28th | 1 | 2 |
| Helen Keller in Her Story | 1954 | 28th | 1 | 1 |
| Men Against the Arctic | 1955 | 28th | 1 | 1 |
| Speedy Gonzales | 1955 | 28th | 1 | 1 |
| Survival City | 1955 | 28th | 1 | 1 |
| Blackboard Jungle | 1955 | 28th | 0 | 4 |
| Guys and Dolls | 1955 | 28th | 0 | 4 |
| Bad Day at Black Rock | 1955 | 28th | 0 | 3 |
| Daddy Long Legs | 1955 | 28th | 0 | 3 |
| Rebel Without a Cause | 1955 | 28th | 0 | 3 |
| The Man with the Golden Arm | 1955 | 28th | 0 | 3 |
| It's Always Fair Weather | 1955 | 28th | 0 | 2 |
| Queen Bee | 1955 | 28th | 0 | 2 |
| Summertime | 1955 | 28th | 0 | 2 |
| The Battle of Gettysburg | 1955 | 28th | 0 | 2 |
| 24-Hour Alert | 1955 | 28th | 0 | 1 |
| 3rd Ave. El | 1955 | 28th | 0 | 1 |
| A Man Called Peter | 1955 | 28th | 0 | 1 |
| Battle Cry | 1955 | 28th | 0 | 1 |
| Gadgets Galore | 1955 | 28th | 0 | 1 |
| Good Will to Men | 1955 | 28th | 0 | 1 |
| Heartbreak Ridge | 1955 | 28th | 0 | 1 |
| Mr. Hulot's Holiday | 1953 | 28th | 0 | 1 |
| No Hunting | 1955 | 28th | 0 | 1 |
| Not as a Stranger | 1955 | 28th | 0 | 1 |
| On the Twelfth Day | 1955 | 28th | 0 | 1 |
| Pete Kelly's Blues | 1955 | 28th | 0 | 1 |
| Strategic Air Command | 1955 | 28th | 0 | 1 |
| Switzerland | 1955 | 28th | 0 | 1 |
| The Court-Martial of Billy Mitchell | 1955 | 28th | 0 | 1 |
| The Dam Busters | 1955 | 28th | 0 | 1 |
| The Legend of Rockabye Point | 1955 | 28th | 0 | 1 |
| The Pickwick Papers | 1952 | 28th | 0 | 1 |
| The Private War of Major Benson | 1955 | 28th | 0 | 1 |
| The Rains of Ranchipur | 1955 | 28th | 0 | 1 |
| The Seven Little Foys | 1955 | 28th | 0 | 1 |
| The Sheep Has Five Legs | 1954 | 28th | 0 | 1 |
| The Tender Trap | 1955 | 28th | 0 | 1 |
| The Virgin Queen | 1955 | 28th | 0 | 1 |
| Three Kisses | 1955 | 28th | 0 | 1 |
| Trial | 1955 | 28th | 0 | 1 |
| Ugetsu | 1953 | 28th | 0 | 1 |
| Unchained | 1955 | 28th | 0 | 1 |
| Samurai, The Legend of Musashi | 1954 | 28th | 0 (1) | 0 |
| **Around the World in 80 Days** | 1956 | 29th | 5 | 8 |
| The King and I | 1956 | 29th | 5 | 9 |
| Somebody Up There Likes Me | 1956 | 29th | 2 | 3 |
| Giant | 1956 | 29th | 1 | 10 |
| The Ten Commandments | 1956 | 29th | 1 | 7 |
| Lust for Life | 1956 | 29th | 1 | 4 |
| The Brave One | 1956 | 29th | 1 | 3 |
| Written on the Wind | 1956 | 29th | 1 | 3 |
| Anastasia | 1956 | 29th | 1 | 2 |
| La Strada | 1954 | 29th | 1 | 2 |
| The Solid Gold Cadillac | 1956 | 29th | 1 | 2 |
| Crashing the Water Barrier | 1956 | 29th | 1 | 1 |
| Magoo's Puddle Jumper | 1956 | 29th | 1 | 1 |
| The Bespoke Overcoat | 1956 | 29th | 1 | 1 |
| The Man Who Knew Too Much | 1956 | 29th | 1 | 1 |
| The Red Balloon | 1956 | 29th | 1 | 1 |
| The Silent World | 1956 | 29th | 1 | 1 |
| The True Story of the Civil War | 1956 | 29th | 1 | 1 |
| Friendly Persuasion | 1956 | 29th | 0 | 6 |
| Baby Doll | 1956 | 29th | 0 | 4 |
| The Bad Seed | 1956 | 29th | 0 | 4 |
| The Eddy Duchin Story | 1956 | 29th | 0 | 4 |
| High Society | 1956 | 29th | 0 | 2 |
| War and Peace | 1956 | 29th | 0 | 3 |
| Julie | 1956 | 29th | 0 | 2 |
| Seven Samurai | 1954 | 29th | 0 | 2 |
| Teenage Rebel | 1956 | 29th | 0 | 2 |
| The Bold and the Brave | 1956 | 29th | 0 | 2 |
| The Dark Wave | 1956 | 29th | 0 | 2 |
| The Proud and Profane | 1956 | 29th | 0 | 2 |
| The Rainmaker | 1956 | 29th | 0 | 2 |
| A City Decides | 1956 | 29th | 0 | 1 |
| Between Heaven and Hell | 1956 | 29th | 0 | 1 |
| Bus Stop | 1956 | 29th | 0 | 1 |
| Cow Dog | 1956 | 29th | 0 | 1 |
| Forbidden Planet | 1956 | 29th | 0 | 1 |
| Gerald McBoing-Boing on Planet Moo | 1956 | 29th | 0 | 1 |
| Gervaise | 1956 | 29th | 0 | 1 |
| I Never Forget a Face | 1956 | 29th | 0 | 1 |
| Man in Space | 1955 | 29th | 0 | 1 |
| Meet Me in Las Vegas | 1956 | 29th | 0 | 1 |
| Qivitoq | 1956 | 29th | 0 | 1 |
| Richard III | 1955 | 29th | 0 | 1 |
| Samoa | 1956 | 29th | 0 | 1 |
| Stagecoach to Fury | 1956 | 29th | 0 | 1 |
| The Best Things in Life Are Free | 1956 | 29th | 0 | 1 |
| The Burmese Harp | 1956 | 29th | 0 | 1 |
| The Captain from Köpenick | 1956 | 29th | 0 | 1 |
| The Harder They Fall | 1956 | 29th | 0 | 1 |
| The House Without a Name | 1956 | 29th | 0 | 1 |
| The Jay Walker | 1956 | 29th | 0 | 1 |
| The Ladykillers | 1955 | 29th | 0 | 1 |
| The Naked Eye | 1956 | 29th | 0 | 1 |
| The Power and the Prize | 1957 | 29th | 0 | 1 |
| The Proud and the Beautiful | 1953 | 29th | 0 | 1 |
| Time Stood Still | 1956 | 29th | 0 | 1 |
| Umberto D. | 1952 | 29th | 0 | 1 |
| Where Mountains Float | 1955 | 29th | 0 | 1 |
| **The Bridge on the River Kwai** | 1957 | 30th | 7 | 8 |
| Sayonara | 1957 | 30th | 4 | 10 |
| Les Girls | 1957 | 30th | 1 | 3 |
| Albert Schweitzer | 1957 | 30th | 1 | 1 |
| Birds Anonymous | 1957 | 30th | 1 | 1 |
| Designing Woman | 1957 | 30th | 1 | 1 |
| Nights of Cabiria | 1957 | 30th | 1 | 1 |
| The Enemy Below | 1957 | 30th | 1 | 1 |
| The Joker Is Wild | 1957 | 30th | 1 | 1 |
| The Three Faces of Eve | 1957 | 30th | 1 | 1 |
| The Wetback Hound | 1957 | 30th | 1 | 1 |
| Peyton Place | 1957 | 30th | 0 | 9 |
| Witness for the Prosecution | 1957 | 30th | 0 | 6 |
| An Affair to Remember | 1957 | 30th | 0 | 4 |
| Funny Face | 1957 | 30th | 0 | 4 |
| Pal Joey | 1957 | 30th | 0 | 4 |
| Raintree County | 1957 | 30th | 0 | 4 |
| 12 Angry Men | 1957 | 30th | 0 | 3 |
| Wild Is the Wind | 1957 | 30th | 0 | 3 |
| Gunfight at the O.K. Corral | 1957 | 30th | 0 | 2 |
| Heaven Knows, Mr. Allison | 1957 | 30th | 0 | 2 |
| A Chairy Tale | 1957 | 30th | 0 | 1 |
| A Farewell to Arms | 1957 | 30th | 0 | 1 |
| A Hatful of Rain | 1957 | 30th | 0 | 1 |
| April Love | 1957 | 30th | 0 | 1 |
| Boy on a Dolphin | 1957 | 30th | 0 | 1 |
| City of Gold | 1957 | 30th | 0 | 1 |
| Foothold on Antarctica | 1957 | 30th | 0 | 1 |
| Gates of Paris | 1957 | 30th | 0 | 1 |
| I Vitelloni | 1953 | 30th | 0 | 1 |
| Man of a Thousand Faces | 1957 | 30th | 0 | 1 |
| Mother India | 1957 | 30th | 0 | 1 |
| Nine Lives | 1957 | 30th | 0 | 1 |
| On the Bowery | 1956 | 30th | 0 | 1 |
| One Droopy Knight | 1957 | 30th | 0 | 1 |
| Perri | 1957 | 30th | 0 | 1 |
| Portugal | 1957 | 30th | 0 | 1 |
| Tabasco Road | 1957 | 30th | 0 | 1 |
| Tammy and the Bachelor | 1957 | 30th | 0 | 1 |
| The Bachelor Party | 1957 | 30th | 0 | 1 |
| The Devil Strikes at Night | 1957 | 30th | 0 | 1 |
| The Spirit of St. Louis | 1957 | 30th | 0 | 1 |
| The Tin Star | 1957 | 30th | 0 | 1 |
| The Truth About Mother Goose | 1957 | 30th | 0 | 1 |
| Torero! | 1956 | 30th | 0 | 1 |
| Trees and Jamaica Daddy | 1957 | 30th | 0 | 1 |
| **Gigi** | 1958 | 31st | 9 | 9 |
| The Defiant Ones | 1958 | 31st | 2 | 9 |
| Separate Tables | 1958 | 31st | 2 | 7 |
| I Want to Live! | 1958 | 31st | 1 | 6 |
| South Pacific | 1958 | 31st | 1 | 3 |
| The Old Man and the Sea | 1958 | 31st | 1 | 3 |
| The Big Country | 1958 | 31st | 1 | 2 |
| White Wilderness | 1958 | 31st | 1 | 2 |
| Ama Girls | 1958 | 31st | 1 | 1 |
| Grand Canyon | 1958 | 31st | 1 | 1 |
| Knighty Knight Bugs | 1958 | 31st | 1 | 1 |
| Mon Oncle | 1958 | 31st | 1 | 1 |
| tom thumb | 1958 | 31st | 1 | 1 |
| Auntie Mame | 1958 | 31st | 0 | 6 |
| Cat on a Hot Tin Roof | 1958 | 31st | 0 | 6 |
| Some Came Running | 1958 | 31st | 0 | 5 |
| A Certain Smile | 1958 | 31st | 0 | 3 |
| The Young Lions | 1958 | 31st | 0 | 3 |
| Bell, Book and Candle | 1958 | 31st | 0 | 2 |
| Houseboat | 1958 | 31st | 0 | 2 |
| Journey into Spring | 1958 | 31st | 0 | 2 |
| Teacher's Pet | 1958 | 31st | 0 | 2 |
| Vertigo | 1958 | 31st | 0 | 2 |
| A Time to Love and a Time to Die | 1958 | 31st | 0 | 1 |
| Antarctic Crossing | 1958 | 31st | 0 | 1 |
| Arms and the Man | 1958 | 31st | 0 | 1 |
| Big Deal on Madonna Street | 1958 | 31st | 0 | 1 |
| Cowboy | 1958 | 31st | 0 | 1 |
| Damn Yankees! | 1958 | 31st | 0 | 1 |
| Desire Under the Elms | 1958 | 31st | 0 | 1 |
| Employees Only | 1958 | 31st | 0 | 1 |
| La venganza | 1958 | 31st | 0 | 1 |
| Lonelyhearts | 1958 | 31st | 0 | 1 |
| Mardi Gras | 1958 | 31st | 0 | 1 |
| Marjorie Morningstar | 1958 | 31st | 0 | 1 |
| Overture | 1958 | 31st | 0 | 1 |
| Paul Bunyan | 1958 | 31st | 0 | 1 |
| Psychiatric Nursing | 1958 | 31st | 0 | 1 |
| Sidney's Family Tree | 1958 | 31st | 0 | 1 |
| Snows of Aorangi | 1958 | 31st | 0 | 1 |
| T Is for Tumbleweed | 1958 | 31st | 0 | 1 |
| The Bolshoi Ballet | 1957 | 31st | 0 | 1 |
| The Brothers Karamazov | 1958 | 31st | 0 | 1 |
| The Buccaneer | 1958 | 31st | 0 | 1 |
| The Goddess | 1958 | 31st | 0 | 1 |
| The Hidden World | 1958 | 31st | 0 | 1 |
| The Horse's Mouth | 1958 | 31st | 0 | 1 |
| The Inn of the Sixth Happiness | 1958 | 31st | 0 | 1 |
| The Kiss | 1958 | 31st | 0 | 1 |
| The Living Stone | 1958 | 31st | 0 | 1 |
| The Road a Year Long | 1958 | 31st | 0 | 1 |
| The Sheepman | 1958 | 31st | 0 | 1 |
| Torpedo Run | 1958 | 31st | 0 | 1 |
| **Ben-Hur** | 1959 | 32nd | 11 | 12 |
| The Diary of Anne Frank | 1959 | 32nd | 3 | 8 |
| Room at the Top | 1959 | 32nd | 2 | 6 |
| Some Like It Hot | 1959 | 32nd | 1 | 6 |
| Pillow Talk | 1959 | 32nd | 1 | 5 |
| Porgy and Bess | 1959 | 32nd | 1 | 4 |
| A Hole in the Head | 1959 | 32nd | 1 | 1 |
| Black Orpheus | 1959 | 32nd | 1 | 1 |
| Glass | 1958 | 32nd | 1 | 1 |
| Moonbird | 1959 | 32nd | 1 | 1 |
| Serengeti Shall Not Die | 1959 | 32nd | 1 | 1 |
| The Golden Fish | 1959 | 32nd | 1 | 1 |
| The Nun's Story | 1959 | 32nd | 0 | 8 |
| Anatomy of a Murder | 1959 | 32nd | 0 | 7 |
| The Five Pennies | 1959 | 32nd | 0 | 4 |
| Career | 1959 | 32nd | 0 | 3 |
| Journey to the Center of the Earth | 1959 | 32nd | 0 | 3 |
| North by Northwest | 1959 | 32nd | 0 | 3 |
| Suddenly, Last Summer | 1959 | 32nd | 0 | 3 |
| The Big Fisherman | 1959 | 32nd | 0 | 3 |
| The Young Philadelphians | 1959 | 32nd | 0 | 3 |
| Imitation of Life | 1959 | 32nd | 0 | 2 |
| On the Beach | 1959 | 32nd | 0 | 2 |
| The Best of Everything | 1959 | 32nd | 0 | 2 |
| The Last Angry Man | 1959 | 32nd | 0 | 2 |
| Between the Tides | 1959 | 32nd | 0 | 1 |
| Donald in Mathmagic Land | 1959 | 32nd | 0 | 1 |
| From Generation to Generation | 1959 | 32nd | 0 | 1 |
| Li'l Abner | 1959 | 32nd | 0 | 1 |
| Libel | 1959 | 32nd | 0 | 1 |
| Mexicali Shmoes | 1959 | 32nd | 0 | 1 |
| Mysteries of the Deep | 1959 | 32nd | 0 | 1 |
| Noah's Ark | 1959 | 32nd | 0 | 1 |
| Operation Petticoat | 1959 | 32nd | 0 | 1 |
| Paw | 1959 | 32nd | 0 | 1 |
| Say One for Me | 1959 | 32nd | 0 | 1 |
| Skyscraper | 1959 | 32nd | 0 | 1 |
| Sleeping Beauty | 1959 | 32nd | 0 | 1 |
| The 400 Blows | 1959 | 32nd | 0 | 1 |
| The Bridge | 1959 | 32nd | 0 | 1 |
| The Gazebo | 1959 | 32nd | 0 | 1 |
| The Great War | 1959 | 32nd | 0 | 1 |
| The Hanging Tree | 1959 | 32nd | 0 | 1 |
| The Race for Space | 1959 | 32nd | 0 | 1 |
| The Running Jumping & Standing Still Film | 1959 | 32nd | 0 | 1 |
| The Village on the River | 1958 | 32nd | 0 | 1 |
| The Violinist | 1959 | 32nd | 0 | 1 |
| The Young Land | 1959 | 32nd | 0 | 1 |
| Wild Strawberries | 1957 | 32nd | 0 | 1 |
| **The Apartment** | 1960 | 33rd | 5 | 10 |
| Spartacus | 1960 | 33rd | 4 | 6 |
| Elmer Gantry | 1960 | 33rd | 3 | 5 |
| Sons and Lovers | 1960 | 33rd | 1 | 7 |
| The Alamo | 1960 | 33rd | 1 | 7 |
| Never on Sunday | 1960 | 33rd | 1 | 5 |
| The Facts of Life | 1960 | 33rd | 1 | 5 |
| Exodus | 1960 | 33rd | 1 | 3 |
| BUtterfield 8 | 1960 | 33rd | 1 | 2 |
| The Virgin Spring | 1960 | 33rd | 1 | 2 |
| Day of the Painter | 1960 | 33rd | 1 | 1 |
| Giuseppina | 1960 | 33rd | 1 | 1 |
| Munro | 1960 | 33rd | 1 | 1 |
| Song Without End | 1960 | 33rd | 1 | 1 |
| The Horse with the Flying Tail | 1960 | 33rd | 1 | 1 |
| The Time Machine | 1960 | 33rd | 1 | 1 |
| Pepe | 1960 | 33rd | 0 | 7 |
| The Sundowners | 1960 | 33rd | 0 | 5 |
| Inherit the Wind | 1960 | 33rd | 0 | 4 |
| Psycho | 1960 | 33rd | 0 | 4 |
| Sunrise at Campobello | 1960 | 33rd | 0 | 4 |
| Can-Can | 1960 | 33rd | 0 | 2 |
| Cimarron | 1960 | 33rd | 0 | 2 |
| A City Called Copenhagen | 1960 | 33rd | 0 | 1 |
| A Place in the Sun | 1960 | 33rd | 0 | 1 |
| A Sport Is Born | 1960 | 33rd | 0 | 1 |
| Bells Are Ringing | 1960 | 33rd | 0 | 1 |
| Beyond Silence | 1960 | 33rd | 0 | 1 |
| George Grosz' Interregnum | 1960 | 33rd | 0 | 1 |
| Goliath II | 1960 | 33rd | 0 | 1 |
| High Note | 1960 | 33rd | 0 | 1 |
| High Time | 1960 | 33rd | 0 | 1 |
| Hiroshima, My Love | 1959 | 33rd | 0 | 1 |
| Islands of the Sea | 1960 | 33rd | 0 | 1 |
| It Started in Naples | 1960 | 33rd | 0 | 1 |
| Kapo | 1960 | 33rd | 0 | 1 |
| La Vérité | 1960 | 33rd | 0 | 1 |
| Let's Make Love | 1960 | 33rd | 0 | 1 |
| Macario | 1960 | 33rd | 0 | 1 |
| Midnight Lace | 1960 | 33rd | 0 | 1 |
| Mouse and Garden | 1960 | 33rd | 0 | 1 |
| Murder, Inc. | 1960 | 33rd | 0 | 1 |
| Rebel in Paradise | 1960 | 33rd | 0 | 1 |
| Seven Thieves | 1960 | 33rd | 0 | 1 |
| The Angry Silence | 1960 | 33rd | 0 | 1 |
| The Creation of Woman | 1961 | 33rd | 0 | 1 |
| The Dark at the Top of the Stairs | 1960 | 33rd | 0 | 1 |
| The Entertainer | 1960 | 33rd | 0 | 1 |
| The Last Voyage | 1960 | 33rd | 0 | 1 |
| The Magnificent Seven | 1960 | 33rd | 0 | 1 |
| The Ninth Circle | 1960 | 33rd | 0 | 1 |
| The Rise and Fall of Legs Diamond | 1960 | 33rd | 0 | 1 |
| Tunes of Glory | 1960 | 33rd | 0 | 1 |
| Universe | 1960 | 33rd | 0 | 1 |
| Visit to a Small Planet | 1960 | 33rd | 0 | 1 |
| Pollyanna | 1960 | 33rd | 0 (1) | 0 |
| **West Side Story** | 1961 | 34th | 10 | 11 |
| Judgment at Nuremberg | 1961 | 34th | 2 | 11 |
| The Hustler | 1961 | 34th | 2 | 9 |
| Breakfast at Tiffany's | 1961 | 34th | 2 | 5 |
| The Guns of Navarone | 1961 | 34th | 1 | 7 |
| La Dolce Vita | 1960 | 34th | 1 | 4 |
| Splendor in the Grass | 1961 | 34th | 1 | 2 |
| Project Hope | 1961 | 34th | 1 | 1 |
| Seawards the Great Ships | 1961 | 34th | 1 | 1 |
| Sky Above and Mud Beneath | 1961 | 34th | 1 | 1 |
| Surogat | 1961 | 34th | 1 | 1 |
| Through a Glass Darkly | 1961 | 34th / 35th | 1 | 2 |
| Two Women | 1960 | 34th | 1 | 1 |
| Fanny | 1961 | 34th | 0 | 5 |
| Flower Drum Song | 1961 | 34th | 0 | 5 |
| The Children's Hour | 1961 | 34th | 0 | 5 |
| Summer and Smoke | 1961 | 34th | 0 | 4 |
| El Cid | 1961 | 34th | 0 | 3 |
| Pocketful of Miracles | 1961 | 34th | 0 | 3 |
| The Absent-Minded Professor | 1961 | 34th | 0 | 3 |
| Babes in Toyland | 1961 | 34th | 0 | 2 |
| The Parent Trap | 1961 | 34th | 0 | 2 |
| A Majority of One | 1961 | 34th | 0 | 1 |
| Aquamania | 1961 | 34th | 0 | 1 |
| Bachelor in Paradise | 1961 | 34th | 0 | 1 |
| Back Street | 1961 | 34th | 0 | 1 |
| Ballad of a Soldier | 1959 | 34th | 0 | 1 |
| Beep Prepared | 1961 | 34th | 0 | 1 |
| Breaking the Language Barrier | 1961 | 34th | 0 | 1 |
| Claudelle Inglish | 1962 | 34th | 0 | 1 |
| Cradle of Genius | 1961 | 34th | 0 | 1 |
| General Della Rovere | 1959 | 34th | 0 | 1 |
| Harry and the Butler | 1961 | 34th | 0 | 1 |
| Immortal Love | 1961 | 34th | 0 | 1 |
| Kahl | 1961 | 34th | 0 | 1 |
| Khovanshchina | 1960 | 34th | 0 | 1 |
| Lover Come Back | 1961 | 34th | 0 | 1 |
| Nelly's Folly | 1961 | 34th | 0 | 1 |
| One-Eyed Jacks | 1961 | 34th | 0 | 1 |
| One, Two, Three | 1961 | 34th | 0 | 1 |
| Paris Blues | 1961 | 34th | 0 | 1 |
| Plácido | 1960 | 34th | 0 | 1 |
| Play Ball! | 1961 | 34th | 0 | 1 |
| Rooftops of New York | 1961 | 34th | 0 | 1 |
| The Face of Jesus | 1961 | 34th | 0 | 1 |
| The Grand Olympics | 1961 | 34th | 0 | 1 |
| The Important Man | 1962 | 34th | 0 | 1 |
| The Man in Gray | 1961 | 34th | 0 | 1 |
| The Mark | 1961 | 34th | 0 | 1 |
| The Pied Piper of Guadalupe | 1961 | 34th | 0 | 1 |
| The Roman Spring of Mrs. Stone | 1961 | 34th | 0 | 1 |
| Town Without Pity | 1961 | 34th | 0 | 1 |
| Very Nice, Very Nice | 1961 | 34th | 0 | 1 |
| Yojimbo | 1961 | 34th | 0 | 1 |
| A Force in Readiness | 1961 | 34th | 0 (1) | 0 |
| **Lawrence of Arabia** | 1962 | 35th | 7 | 10 |
| To Kill a Mockingbird | 1962 | 35th | 3 | 8 |
| The Longest Day | 1962 | 35th | 2 | 5 |
| The Miracle Worker | 1962 | 35th | 2 | 5 |
| The Music Man | 1962 | 35th | 1 | 6 |
| Days of Wine and Roses | 1962 | 35th | 1 | 5 |
| What Ever Happened to Baby Jane? | 1962 | 35th | 1 | 5 |
| The Wonderful World of the Brothers Grimm | 1962 | 35th | 1 | 4 |
| Divorce Italian Style | 1961 | 35th | 1 | 3 |
| Sweet Bird of Youth | 1962 | 35th | 1 | 3 |
| Black Fox | 1962 | 35th | 1 | 1 |
| Dylan Thomas | 1962 | 35th | 1 | 1 |
| Heureux Anniversaire | 1962 | 35th | 1 | 1 |
| Sundays and Cybele | 1962 | 35th / 36th | 1 | 3 |
| The Hole | 1962 | 35th | 1 | 1 |
| Mutiny on the Bounty | 1962 | 35th | 0 | 7 |
| Birdman of Alcatraz | 1962 | 35th | 0 | 4 |
| Gypsy | 1962 | 35th | 0 | 3 |
| That Touch of Mink | 1962 | 35th | 0 | 3 |
| Bon Voyage! | 1962 | 35th | 0 | 2 |
| David and Lisa | 1962 | 35th | 0 | 2 |
| Freud: The Secret Passion | 1962 | 35th | 0 | 2 |
| The Manchurian Candidate | 1962 | 35th | 0 | 2 |
| Two for the Seesaw | 1962 | 35th | 0 | 2 |
| A Symposium on Popular Songs | 1962 | 35th | 0 | 1 |
| Alvorada | 1962 | 35th | 0 | 1 |
| Big City Blues | 1962 | 35th | 0 | 1 |
| Billy Budd | 1962 | 35th | 0 | 1 |
| Billy Rose's Jumbo | 1962 | 35th | 0 | 1 |
| Electra | 1962 | 35th | 0 | 1 |
| Gigot | 1962 | 35th | 0 | 1 |
| Hatari! | 1962 | 35th | 0 | 1 |
| Icarus Montgolfier Wright | 1962 | 35th | 0 | 1 |
| Keeper of Promises | 1962 | 35th | 0 | 1 |
| Last Year at Marienbad | 1961 | 35th | 0 | 1 |
| Lolita | 1962 | 35th | 0 | 1 |
| Long Day's Journey into Night | 1962 | 35th | 0 | 1 |
| My Geisha | 1962 | 35th | 0 | 1 |
| Now Hear This | 1963 | 35th | 0 | 1 |
| Pan | 1962 | 35th | 0 | 1 |
| Period of Adjustment | 1962 | 35th | 0 | 1 |
| Phaedra | 1962 | 35th | 0 | 1 |
| Self Defense... for Cowards | 1962 | 35th | 0 | 1 |
| Taras Bulba | 1962 | 35th | 0 | 1 |
| Tender Is the Night | 1962 | 35th | 0 | 1 |
| The Cadillac | 1962 | 35th | 0 | 1 |
| The Cliff Dwellers | 1962 | 35th | 0 | 1 |
| The Four Days of Naples | 1962 | 35th / 36th | 0 | 2 |
| The John Glenn Story | 1962 | 35th | 0 | 1 |
| The Man Who Shot Liberty Valance | 1962 | 35th | 0 | 1 |
| The Pigeon That Took Rome | 1962 | 35th | 0 | 1 |
| The Road to the Wall | 1962 | 35th | 0 | 1 |
| Tlayucan | 1962 | 35th | 0 | 1 |
| Walk on the Wild Side | 1962 | 35th | 0 | 1 |
| **Tom Jones** | 1963 | 36th | 4 | 10 |
| Cleopatra | 1963 | 36th | 4 | 9 |
| How the West Was Won | 1962 | 36th | 3 | 8 |
| Hud | 1963 | 36th | 3 | 7 |
| 8½ | 1963 | 36th | 2 | 5 |
| It's a Mad, Mad, Mad, Mad World | 1963 | 36th | 1 | 6 |
| Lilies of the Field | 1963 | 36th | 1 | 5 |
| America America | 1963 | 36th | 1 | 4 |
| Irma la Douce | 1963 | 36th | 1 | 3 |
| An Occurrence at Owl Creek Bridge | 1962 | 36th | 1 | 1 |
| Chagall | 1963 | 36th | 1 | 1 |
| Papa's Delicate Condition | 1963 | 36th | 1 | 1 |
| Robert Frost: A Lover's Quarrel with the World | 1963 | 36th | 1 | 1 |
| The Critic | 1963 | 36th | 1 | 1 |
| The V.I.P.s | 1963 | 36th | 1 | 1 |
| The Cardinal | 1963 | 36th | 0 | 6 |
| Love with the Proper Stranger | 1963 | 36th | 0 | 5 |
| Captain Newman, M.D. | 1963 | 36th | 0 | 3 |
| 55 Days at Peking | 1963 | 36th | 0 | 2 |
| A New Kind of Love | 1963 | 36th | 0 | 2 |
| Bye Bye Birdie | 1963 | 36th | 0 | 2 |
| This Sporting Life | 1963 | 36th | 0 | 2 |
| Twilight of Honor | 1963 | 36th | 0 | 2 |
| A Gathering of Eagles | 1963 | 36th | 0 | 1 |
| Automania 2000 | 1963 | 36th | 0 | 1 |
| Charade | 1963 | 36th | 0 | 1 |
| Come Blow Your Horn | 1963 | 36th | 0 | 1 |
| The Home-Made Car | 1963 | 36th | 0 | 1 |
| Knife in the Water | 1962 | 36th | 0 | 1 |
| Le Maillon et la Chaine | 1963 | 36th | 0 | 1 |
| Los Tarantos | 1963 | 36th | 0 | 1 |
| Mondo Cane | 1962 | 36th | 0 | 1 |
| My Financial Career | 1962 | 36th | 0 | 1 |
| Pianissimo | 1963 | 36th | 0 | 1 |
| The Six-Sided Triangle | 1963 | 36th | 0 | 1 |
| Terminus | 1961 | 36th | 0 | 0 |
| That's Me | 1963 | 36th | 0 | 1 |
| The Balcony | 1963 | 36th | 0 | 1 |
| The Birds | 1963 | 36th | 0 | 1 |
| The Caretakers | 1963 | 36th | 0 | 1 |
| The Concert | 1962 | 36th | 0 | 1 |
| The Five Cities of June | 1963 | 36th | 0 | 1 |
| The Game | 1962 | 36th | 0 | 1 |
| The Great Escape | 1963 | 36th | 0 | 1 |
| The L-Shaped Room | 1962 | 36th | 0 | 1 |
| The Leopard | 1963 | 36th | 0 | 1 |
| The Red Lanterns | 1963 | 36th | 0 | 1 |
| The Spirit of America | 1963 | 36th | 0 | 1 |
| The Stripper | 1963 | 36th | 0 | 1 |
| The Sword in the Stone | 1963 | 36th | 0 | 1 |
| The Yanks Are Coming | 1963 | 36th | 0 | 1 |
| Thirty Million Letters | 1963 | 36th | 0 | 1 |
| To Live Again | 1963 | 36th | 0 | 1 |
| Toys in the Attic | 1963 | 36th | 0 | 1 |
| Twin Sisters of Kyoto | 1963 | 36th | 0 | 1 |
| Wives and Lovers | 1963 | 36th | 0 | 1 |
| **My Fair Lady** | 1964 | 37th | 8 | 12 |
| Mary Poppins | 1964 | 37th | 5 | 13 |
| Zorba the Greek | 1964 | 37th | 3 | 7 |
| Becket | 1964 | 37th | 1 | 12 |
| The Night of the Iguana | 1964 | 37th | 1 | 4 |
| Father Goose | 1964 | 37th | 1 | 3 |
| Casals Conducts: 1964 | 1964 | 37th | 1 | 1 |
| Goldfinger | 1964 | 37th | 1 | 1 |
| Jacques-Yves Coustrau's World Without Sun | 1964 | 37th | 1 | 1 |
| Nine from Little Rock | 1964 | 37th | 1 | 1 |
| The Pink Phink | 1964 | 37th | 1 | 1 |
| Topkapi | 1964 | 37th | 1 | 1 |
| Yesterday, Today and Tomorrow | 1963 | 37th | 1 | 1 |
| Hush...Hush, Sweet Charlotte | 1964 | 37th | 0 | 7 |
| The Unsinkable Molly Brown | 1964 | 37th | 0 | 6 |
| Dr. Strangelove or: How I Learned to Stop Worrying and Love the Bomb | 1964 | 37th | 0 | 4 |
| A Hard Day's Night | 1964 | 37th | 0 | 2 |
| Robin and the 7 Hoods | 1964 | 37th | 0 | 2 |
| Seven Days in May | 1964 | 37th | 0 | 2 |
| The Americanization of Emily | 1964 | 37th | 0 | 2 |
| What a Way to Go! | 1964 | 37th | 0 | 2 |
| 14-18 | 1963 | 37th | 0 | 1 |
| 140 Days Under the World | 1964 | 37th | 0 | 1 |
| 7 Faces of Dr. Lao | 1964 | 37th | 0 (1) | 1 |
| A House Is Not a Home | 1964 | 37th | 0 | 1 |
| Breaking the Habit | 1964 | 37th | 0 | 1 |
| Cheyenne Autumn | 1964 | 37th | 0 | 1 |
| Children Without | 1964 | 37th | 0 | 1 |
| Christmas Cracker | 1963 | 37th | 0 | 1 |
| Dear Heart | 1964 | 37th | 0 | 1 |
| Eskimo Artist: Kenojuak | 1964 | 37th | 0 | 1 |
| Fate Is the Hunter | 1964 | 37th | 0 | 1 |
| Four Days in November | 1964 | 37th | 0 | 1 |
| Help! My Snowman's Burning Down | 1964 | 37th | 0 | 1 |
| How to Avoid Friendship | 1964 | 37th | 0 | 1 |
| Kisses for My President | 1964 | 37th | 0 | 1 |
| Marriage Italian Style | 1964 | 37th / 38th | 0 | 2 |
| Nudnik #2 | 1965 | 37th | 0 | 1 |
| One Potato, Two Potato | 1964 | 37th | 0 | 1 |
| Raven's End | 1963 | 37th | 0 | 1 |
| Sallah Shabati | 1964 | 37th | 0 | 1 |
| Séance on a Wet Afternoon | 1964 | 37th | 0 | 1 |
| That Man from Rio | 1964 | 37th | 0 | 1 |
| The Best Man | 1964 | 37th | 0 | 1 |
| The Chalk Garden | 1964 | 37th | 0 | 1 |
| The Fall of the Roman Empire | 1964 | 37th | 0 | 1 |
| The Finest Hours | 1964 | 37th | 0 | 1 |
| The Human Dutch | 1963 | 37th | 0 | 1 |
| The Legend of Jimmy Blue Eyes | 1964 | 37th | 0 | 1 |
| The Lively Set | 1964 | 37th | 0 | 1 |
| The Organizer | 1963 | 37th | 0 | 1 |
| The Pink Panther | 1964 | 37th | 0 | 1 |
| The Pumpkin Eater | 1964 | 37th | 0 | 1 |
| The Umbrellas of Cherbourg | 1964 | 37th / 38th | 0 | 5 |
| The Visit | 1964 | 37th | 0 | 1 |
| Where Love Has Gone | 1964 | 37th | 0 | 1 |
| Woman in the Dunes | 1964 | 37th / 38th | 0 | 2 |
| **The Sound of Music** | 1965 | 38th | 5 | 10 |
| Doctor Zhivago | 1965 | 38th | 5 | 10 |
| Darling | 1965 | 38th | 3 | 5 |
| Ship of Fools | 1965 | 38th | 2 | 8 |
| A Patch of Blue | 1965 | 38th | 1 | 5 |
| Cat Ballou | 1965 | 38th | 1 | 5 |
| The Great Race | 1965 | 38th | 1 | 5 |
| A Thousand Clowns | 1965 | 38th | 1 | 4 |
| The Chicken | 1965 | 38th | 1 | 1 |
| The Dot and the Line | 1965 | 38th | 1 | 1 |
| The Eleanor Roosevelt Story | 1965 | 38th | 1 | 1 |
| The Sandpiper | 1965 | 38th | 1 | 1 |
| The Shop on Main Street | 1965 | 38th / 39th | 1 | 2 |
| Thunderball | 1965 | 38th | 1 | 1 |
| To Be Alive! | 1964 | 38th | 1 | 1 |
| The Agony and the Ecstasy | 1965 | 38th | 0 | 5 |
| The Greatest Story Ever Told | 1965 | 38th | 0 | 5 |
| Othello | 1965 | 38th | 0 | 4 |
| Inside Daisy Clover | 1965 | 38th | 0 | 3 |
| The Collector | 1965 | 38th | 0 | 3 |
| King Rat | 1965 | 38th | 0 | 2 |
| Morituri | 1965 | 38th | 0 | 2 |
| The Flight of the Phoenix | 1965 | 38th | 0 | 2 |
| The Slender Thread | 1965 | 38th | 0 | 2 |
| The Spy Who Came In from the Cold | 1965 | 38th | 0 | 2 |
| A Rage to Live | 1965 | 38th | 0 | 1 |
| Blood on the Land | 1966 | 38th | 0 | 1 |
| Casanova 70 | 1965 | 38th | 0 | 1 |
| Clay or the Origin of Species | 1965 | 38th | 0 | 1 |
| Dear John | 1964 | 38th | 0 | 1 |
| Fortress of Peace | 1964 | 38th | 0 | 1 |
| In Harm's Way | 1965 | 38th | 0 | 1 |
| Kwaidan | 1965 | 38th | 0 | 1 |
| Let My People Go: The Story of Israel | 1965 | 38th | 0 | 1 |
| Mural on Our Street | 1965 | 38th | 0 | 1 |
| Nyitany | 1965 | 38th | 0 | 1 |
| Point of View | 1965 | 38th | 0 | 1 |
| Shenandoah | 1965 | 38th | 0 | 1 |
| Skaterdater | 1965 | 38th | 0 | 1 |
| Snow | 1963 | 38th | 0 | 1 |
| The Battle of the Bulge... The Brave Rifles | 1965 | 38th | 0 | 1 |
| The Forth Road Bridge | 1965 | 38th | 0 | 1 |
| The Pawnbroker | 1964 | 38th | 0 | 1 |
| The Pleasure Seekers | 1964 | 38th | 0 | 1 |
| The Thieving Magpie | 1965 | 38th | 0 | 1 |
| The Train | 1964 | 38th | 0 | 1 |
| Those Magnificent Men in Their Flying Machines | 1965 | 38th | 0 | 1 |
| Time Piece | 1965 | 38th | 0 | 1 |
| To Die in Madrid | 1963 | 38th | 0 | 1 |
| Von Ryan's Express | 1965 | 38th | 0 | 1 |
| What's New Pussycat? | 1965 | 38th | 0 | 1 |
| Yeats Country | 1965 | 38th | 0 | 1 |
| **A Man for All Seasons** | 1966 | 39th | 6 | 8 |
| Who's Afraid of Virginia Woolf? | 1966 | 39th | 5 | 13 |
| Grand Prix | 1966 | 39th | 3 | 3 |
| Fantastic Voyage | 1966 | 39th | 2 | 5 |
| A Man and a Woman | 1966 | 39th | 2 | 4 |
| Born Free | 1966 | 39th | 2 | 2 |
| The Fortune Cookie | 1966 | 39th | 1 | 4 |
| A Funny Thing Happened on the Way to the Forum | 1966 | 39th | 1 | 1 |
| A Herb Alpert and the Tijuana Brass Double Feature | 1966 | 39th | 1 | 1 |
| A Year Toward Tomorrow | 1966 | 39th | 1 | 1 |
| The War Game | 1966 | 39th | 1 | 1 |
| Wild Wings | 1966 | 39th | 1 | 1 |
| The Sand Pebbles | 1966 | 39th | 0 | 8 |
| Hawaii | 1966 | 39th | 0 | 7 |
| Alfie | 1966 | 39th | 0 | 5 |
| Georgy Girl | 1966 | 39th | 0 | 4 |
| The Russians Are Coming, the Russians Are Coming | 1966 | 39th | 0 | 4 |
| Gambit | 1966 | 39th | 0 | 3 |
| The Gospel According to St. Matthew | 1964 | 39th | 0 | 3 |
| The Professionals | 1966 | 39th | 0 | 3 |
| Blowup | 1966 | 39th | 0 | 2 |
| Is Paris Burning? | 1966 | 39th | 0 | 2 |
| Juliet of the Spirits | 1965 | 39th | 0 | 2 |
| Mister Buddwing | 1966 | 39th | 0 | 2 |
| Morgan! | 1966 | 39th | 0 | 2 |
| The Oscar | 1966 | 39th | 0 | 2 |
| Adolescence | 1966 | 39th | 0 | 1 |
| An American Dream | 1966 | 39th | 0 | 1 |
| Cowboy | 1966 | 39th | 0 | 1 |
| Helicopter Canada | 1966 | 39th | 0 | 1 |
| Khartoum | 1966 | 39th | 0 | 1 |
| Le Volcan interdit | 1966 | 39th | 0 | 1 |
| Loves of a Blonde | 1965 | 39th | 0 | 1 |
| Mandragola | 1965 | 39th | 0 | 1 |
| Pharaoh | 1966 | 39th | 0 | 1 |
| Részletek J.S. Bach Máté passiójából | 1966 | 39th | 0 | 1 |
| Return of the Seven | 1966 | 39th | 0 | 1 |
| Seconds | 1966 | 39th | 0 | 1 |
| Stop the World – I Want to Get Off | 1966 | 39th | 0 | 1 |
| The Battle of Algiers | 1966 | 39th / 41st | 0 | 3 |
| The Bible: In the Beginning... | 1966 | 39th | 0 | 1 |
| The Drag | 1966 | 39th | 0 | 1 |
| The Face of a Genius | 1966 | 39th | 0 | 1 |
| The Naked Prey | 1965 | 39th | 0 | 1 |
| The Odds Against | 1966 | 39th | 0 | 1 |
| The Pink Blueprint | 1966 | 39th | 0 | 1 |
| The Really Big Family | 1966 | 39th | 0 | 1 |
| The Singing Nun | 1966 | 39th | 0 | 1 |
| The Winning Strain | 1966 | 39th | 0 | 1 |
| Three | 1965 | 39th | 0 | 1 |
| Turkey the Bridge | 1966 | 39th | 0 | 1 |
| You're a Big Boy Now | 1966 | 39th | 0 | 1 |
| **In the Heat of the Night** | 1967 | 40th | 5 | 7 |
| Camelot | 1967 | 40th | 3 | 5 |
| Bonnie and Clyde | 1967 | 40th | 2 | 10 |
| Guess Who's Coming to Dinner | 1967 | 40th | 2 | 10 |
| Doctor Dolittle | 1967 | 40th | 2 | 9 |
| The Graduate | 1967 | 40th | 1 | 7 |
| Thoroughly Modern Millie | 1967 | 40th | 1 | 7 |
| Cool Hand Luke | 1967 | 40th | 1 | 4 |
| The Dirty Dozen | 1967 | 40th | 1 | 4 |
| A Place to Stand | 1967 | 40th | 1 | 2 |
| Closely Watched Trains | 1966 | 40th | 1 | 1 |
| The Anderson Platoon | 1967 | 40th | 1 | 1 |
| The Box | 1967 | 40th | 1 | 1 |
| The Redwoods | 1967 | 40th | 1 | 1 |
| In Cold Blood | 1967 | 40th | 0 | 4 |
| The Taming of the Shrew | 1967 | 40th | 0 | 2 |
| A King's Story | 1965 | 40th | 0 | 1 |
| A Time for Burning | 1966 | 40th | 0 | 1 |
| Banning | 1967 | 40th | 0 | 1 |
| Barefoot in the Park | 1967 | 40th | 0 | 1 |
| Beach Red | 1967 | 40th | 0 | 1 |
| Casino Royale | 1967 | 40th | 0 | 1 |
| Divorce American Style | 1967 | 40th | 0 | 1 |
| El amor brujo | 1967 | 40th | 0 | 1 |
| Far from the Madding Crowd | 1967 | 40th | 0 | 1 |
| Festival | 1967 | 40th | 0 | 1 |
| Harvest | 1967 | 40th | 0 | 1 |
| Hypothese Beta | 1967 | 40th | 0 | 1 |
| I Even Met Happy Gypsies | 1967 | 40th | 0 | 1 |
| Live for Life | 1967 | 40th | 0 | 1 |
| Monument to the Dream | 1967 | 40th | 0 | 1 |
| Paddle to the Sea | 1966 | 40th | 0 | 1 |
| Portrait of Chieko | 1967 | 40th | 0 | 1 |
| See You at the Pillar | 1967 | 40th | 0 | 1 |
| Sky Over Holland | 1967 | 40th | 0 | 1 |
| Stop Look and Listen | 1967 | 40th | 0 | 1 |
| The Happiest Millionaire | 1967 | 40th | 0 | 1 |
| The Jungle Book | 1967 | 40th | 0 | 1 |
| The War Is Over | 1966 | 40th | 0 | 1 |
| The Whisperers | 1967 | 40th | 0 | 1 |
| Tobruk | 1967 | 40th | 0 | 1 |
| Two for the Road | 1967 | 40th | 0 | 1 |
| Ulysses | 1967 | 40th | 0 | 1 |
| Valley of the Dolls | 1967 | 40th | 0 | 1 |
| Wait Until Dark | 1967 | 40th | 0 | 1 |
| What on Earth! | 1966 | 40th | 0 | 1 |
| While I Run This Race | 1967 | 40th | 0 | 1 |
| **Oliver!** | 1968 | 41st | 5 (1) | 11 |
| The Lion in Winter | 1968 | 41st | 3 | 7 |
| Romeo and Juliet | 1968 | 41st | 2 | 4 |
| Funny Girl | 1968 | 41st | 1 | 8 |
| 2001: A Space Odyssey | 1968 | 41st | 1 | 4 |
| Bullitt | 1968 | 41st | 1 | 2 |
| Rosemary's Baby | 1968 | 41st | 1 | 2 |
| The Producers | 1967 | 41st | 1 | 2 |
| The Subject Was Roses | 1968 | 41st | 1 | 2 |
| The Thomas Crown Affair | 1968 | 41st | 1 | 2 |
| War and Peace | 1966 | 41st | 1 | 2 |
| Charly | 1968 | 41st | 1 | 1 |
| Journey into Self | 1968 | 41st | 1 | 1 |
| Robert Kennedy Remembered | 1968 | 41st | 1 | 1 |
| Why Man Creates | 1968 | 41st | 1 | 1 |
| Winnie the Pooh and the Blustery Day | 1968 | 41st | 1 | 1 |
| Star! | 1968 | 41st | 0 | 7 |
| Rachel, Rachel | 1968 | 41st | 0 | 4 |
| Faces | 1968 | 41st | 0 | 3 |
| Finian's Rainbow | 1968 | 41st | 0 | 2 |
| Ice Station Zebra | 1968 | 41st | 0 | 2 |
| Planet of the Apes | 1968 | 41st | 0 (1) | 2 |
| The Heart Is a Lonely Hunter | 1968 | 41st | 0 | 2 |
| The Odd Couple | 1968 | 41st | 0 | 2 |
| The Shoes of the Fisherman | 1968 | 41st | 0 | 2 |
| A Few Notes on Our Food Problem | 1968 | 41st | 0 | 1 |
| A Space to Grow | 1968 | 41st | 0 | 1 |
| A Way Out of the Wilderness | 1968 | 41st | 0 | 1 |
| Chitty Chitty Bang Bang | 1968 | 41st | 0 | 1 |
| Duo | 1968 | 41st | 0 | 1 |
| For Love of Ivy | 1968 | 41st | 0 | 1 |
| Hot Millions | 1968 | 41st | 0 | 1 |
| Isadora | 1968 | 41st | 0 | 1 |
| Other Voices | 1970 | 41st | 0 | 1 |
| Prelude | 1968 | 41st | 0 | 1 |
| Stolen Kisses | 1968 | 41st | 0 | 1 |
| The Boys of Paul Street | 1969 | 41st | 0 | 1 |
| The Dove | 1968 | 41st | 0 | 1 |
| The Firemen's Ball | 1967 | 41st | 0 | 1 |
| The Fixer | 1968 | 41st | 0 | 1 |
| The Fox | 1967 | 41st | 0 | 1 |
| The Girl with the Pistol | 1968 | 41st | 0 | 1 |
| The House That Ananda Built | 1968 | 41st | 0 | 1 |
| The House That Jack Built | 1967 | 41st | 0 | 1 |
| Legendary Champions | 1968 | 41st | 0 | 1 |
| The Magic Pear Tree | 1968 | 41st | 0 | 1 |
| The Revolving Door | 1968 | 41st | 0 | 1 |
| The Young Girls of Rochefort | 1967 | 41st | 0 | 1 |
| Wild in the Streets | 1968 | 41st | 0 | 1 |
| Windy Day | 1968 | 41st | 0 | 1 |
| Young Americans | 1967 | 41st | 0 | 0 |
| **Midnight Cowboy** | 1969 | 42nd | 3 | 7 |
| Butch Cassidy and the Sundance Kid | 1969 | 42nd | 4 | 7 |
| Hello, Dolly! | 1969 | 42nd | 3 | 7 |
| Z | 1969 | 42nd | 2 | 5 |
| Anne of the Thousand Days | 1969 | 42nd | 1 | 10 |
| They Shoot Horses, Don't They? | 1969 | 42nd | 1 | 9 |
| Marooned | 1969 | 42nd | 1 | 3 |
| The Magic Machines | 1969 | 42nd | 1 | 2 |
| The Prime of Miss Jean Brodie | 1969 | 42nd | 1 | 2 |
| True Grit | 1969 | 42nd | 1 | 2 |
| Arthur Rubinstein – The Love of Life | 1969 | 42nd | 1 | 1 |
| Cactus Flower | 1969 | 42nd | 1 | 1 |
| Czechoslovakia 1968 | 1969 | 42nd | 1 | 1 |
| It's Tough to Be a Bird | 1969 | 42nd | 1 | 1 |
| Bob & Carol & Ted & Alice | 1969 | 42nd | 0 | 4 |
| Gaily, Gaily | 1969 | 42nd | 0 | 3 |
| Sweet Charity | 1969 | 42nd | 0 | 3 |
| Easy Rider | 1969 | 42nd | 0 | 2 |
| Goodbye, Mr. Chips | 1969 | 42nd | 0 | 2 |
| The Happy Ending | 1969 | 42nd | 0 | 2 |
| The Reivers | 1969 | 42nd | 0 | 2 |
| The Secret of Santa Vittoria | 1969 | 42nd | 0 | 2 |
| The Sterile Cuckoo | 1969 | 42nd | 0 | 2 |
| The Wild Bunch | 1969 | 42nd | 0 | 2 |
| Ådalen 31 | 1969 | 42nd | 0 | 1 |
| Alice's Restaurant | 1969 | 42nd | 0 | 1 |
| An Impression of John Steinbeck: Writer | 1969 | 42nd | 0 | 1 |
| Battle of Neretva | 1969 | 42nd | 0 | 1 |
| Before the Mountain Was Moved | 1970 | 42nd | 0 | 1 |
| Blake | 1969 | 42nd | 0 | 1 |
| Goodbye, Columbus | 1969 | 42nd | 0 | 1 |
| In the Year of the Pig | 1969 | 42nd | 0 | 1 |
| Jenny Is a Good Thing | 1969 | 42nd | 0 | 1 |
| Krakatoa, East of Java | 1968 | 42nd | 0 | 1 |
| Last Summer | 1969 | 42nd | 0 | 1 |
| Leo Beuerman | 1969 | 42nd | 0 | 1 |
| My Night at Maud's | 1969 | 42nd / 43rd | 0 | 2 |
| Of Men and Demons | 1969 | 42nd | 0 | 1 |
| Olimpiada en México | 1969 | 42nd | 0 | 1 |
| Paint Your Wagon | 1969 | 42nd | 0 | 1 |
| People Soup | 1969 | 42nd | 0 | 1 |
| The Brothers Karamazov | 1969 | 42nd | 0 | 1 |
| The Damned | 1969 | 42nd | 0 | 1 |
| The Wolf Men | 1969 | 42nd | 0 | 1 |
| Walking | 1968 | 42nd | 0 | 1 |
| **Patton** | 1969 | 43rd | 7 | 10 |
| Ryan's Daughter | 1970 | 43rd | 2 | 4 |
| Airport | 1970 | 43rd | 1 | 10 |
| Love Story | 1970 | 43rd | 1 | 7 |
| M*A*S*H | 1970 | 43rd | 1 | 5 |
| Tora! Tora! Tora! | 1970 | 43rd | 1 | 5 |
| Women in Love | 1969 | 43rd | 1 | 4 |
| Lovers and Other Strangers | 1970 | 43rd | 1 | 3 |
| Woodstock | 1970 | 43rd | 1 | 3 |
| Cromwell | 1970 | 43rd | 1 | 2 |
| Interviews with My Lai Veterans | 1970 | 43rd | 1 | 1 |
| Investigation of a Citizen Above Suspicion | 1970 | 43rd / 44th | 1 | 2 |
| Is It Always Right to Be Right? | 1970 | 43rd | 1 | 1 |
| Let It Be | 1970 | 43rd | 1 | 1 |
| The Resurrection of Broncho Billy | 1970 | 43rd | 1 | 1 |
| Five Easy Pieces | 1970 | 43rd | 0 | 4 |
| Scrooge | 1970 | 43rd | 0 | 4 |
| Darling Lili | 1970 | 43rd | 0 | 3 |
| I Never Sang for My Father | 1970 | 43rd | 0 | 3 |
| The Great White Hope | 1970 | 43rd | 0 | 2 |
| A Boy Named Charlie Brown | 1969 | 43rd | 0 | 1 |
| A Long Way from Nowhere | 1970 | 43rd | 0 | 1 |
| Chariots of the Gods | 1970 | 43rd | 0 | 1 |
| Diary of a Mad Housewife | 1970 | 43rd | 0 | 1 |
| Fellini Satyricon | 1969 | 43rd | 0 | 1 |
| First Love | 1970 | 43rd | 0 | 1 |
| Hoa-Binh | 1970 | 43rd | 0 | 1 |
| I Girasoli | 1970 | 43rd | 0 | 1 |
| Jack Johnson | 1970 | 43rd | 0 | 1 |
| Joe | 1970 | 43rd | 0 | 1 |
| King: A Filmed Record... Montgomery to Memphis | 1970 | 43rd | 0 | 1 |
| Little Big Man | 1970 | 43rd | 0 | 1 |
| Madron | 1970 | 43rd | 0 | 1 |
| Oisin | 1970 | 43rd | 0 | 1 |
| Paix sur les champs | 1970 | 43rd | 0 | 1 |
| Pieces of Dreams | 1970 | 43rd | 0 | 1 |
| Say Goodbye | 1971 | 43rd | 0 | 1 |
| Shut Up... I'm Crying | 1970 | 43rd | 0 | 1 |
| Sticky My Fingers... Fleet My Feet | 1970 | 43rd | 0 | 1 |
| The Baby Maker | 1970 | 43rd | 0 | 1 |
| The Further Adventures of Uncle Sam: Part Two | 1970 | 43rd | 0 | 1 |
| The Gifts | 1970 | 43rd | 0 | 1 |
| The Hawaiians | 1970 | 43rd | 0 | 1 |
| The Landlord | 1970 | 43rd | 0 | 1 |
| The Molly Maguires | 1970 | 43rd | 0 | 1 |
| The Shepherd | 1970 | 43rd | 0 | 1 |
| Time Is Running Out | 1970 | 43rd | 0 | 1 |
| Tristana | 1970 | 43rd | 0 | 1 |
| **The French Connection** | 1971 | 44th | 5 | 8 |
| Fiddler on the Roof | 1971 | 44th | 3 | 8 |
| The Last Picture Show | 1971 | 44th | 2 | 8 |
| Nicholas and Alexandra | 1971 | 44th | 2 | 6 |
| Sentinels of Silence | 1971 | 44th | 2 | 2 |
| Bedknobs and Broomsticks | 1971 | 44th | 1 | 5 |
| Summer of '42 | 1971 | 44th | 1 | 4 |
| Klute | 1971 | 44th | 1 | 2 |
| Shaft | 1971 | 44th | 1 | 2 |
| The Garden of the Finzi-Continis | 1970 | 44th | 1 | 2 |
| The Hospital | 1971 | 44th | 1 | 2 |
| The Crunch Bird | 1971 | 44th | 1 | 1 |
| The Hellstrom Chronicle | 1971 | 44th | 1 | 1 |
| Mary, Queen of Scots | 1971 | 44th | 0 | 5 |
| A Clockwork Orange | 1971 | 44th | 0 | 4 |
| Kotch | 1971 | 44th | 0 | 4 |
| Sunday Bloody Sunday | 1971 | 44th | 0 | 4 |
| Sometimes a Great Notion | 1971 | 44th | 0 | 2 |
| Tchaikovsky | 1970 | 44th | 0 | 2 |
| The Andromeda Strain | 1971 | 44th | 0 | 2 |
| Adventures in Perception | 1971 | 44th | 0 | 1 |
| Alaska Wilderness Lake | 1971 | 44th | 0 | 1 |
| Art Is... | 1971 | 44th | 0 | 1 |
| Bless the Beasts and Children | 1971 | 44th | 0 | 1 |
| Carnal Knowledge | 1971 | 44th | 0 | 1 |
| Death in Venice | 1971 | 44th | 0 | 1 |
| Diamonds Are Forever | 1971 | 44th | 0 | 1 |
| Dodes'ka-den | 1970 | 44th | 0 | 1 |
| Evolution | 1971 | 44th | 0 | 1 |
| Good Morning | 1971 | 44th | 0 | 1 |
| McCabe & Mrs. Miller | 1971 | 44th | 0 | 1 |
| On Any Sunday | 1971 | 44th | 0 | 1 |
| Ra | 1972 | 44th | 0 | 1 |
| Somebody Waiting | 1971 | 44th | 0 | 1 |
| Straw Dogs | 1971 | 44th | 0 | 1 |
| The Boy Friend | 1971 | 44th | 0 | 1 |
| The Conformist | 1970 | 44th | 0 | 1 |
| The Emigrants | 1971 | 44th / 45th | 0 | 5 |
| The Go-Between | 1971 | 44th | 0 | 1 |
| The Numbers Start with the River | 1971 | 44th | 0 | 1 |
| The Policeman | 1970 | 44th | 0 | 1 |
| The Rehearsal | 1971 | 44th | 0 | 1 |
| The Selfish Giant | 1972 | 44th | 0 | 1 |
| The Sorrow and the Pity | 1969 | 44th | 0 | 1 |
| What's the Matter with Helen? | 1971 | 44th | 0 | 1 |
| When Dinosaurs Ruled the Earth | 1970 | 44th | 0 | 1 |
| Who Is Harry Kellerman and Why Is He Saying Those Terrible Things About Me? | 1971 | 44th | 0 | 1 |
| Willy Wonka & the Chocolate Factory | 1971 | 44th | 0 | 1 |
| **The Godfather** | 1972 | 45th | 3 | 10 |
| Cabaret | 1972 | 45th | 8 | 10 |
| The Poseidon Adventure | 1972 | 45th | 1 (1) | 8 |
| Travels with My Aunt | 1972 | 45th | 1 | 4 |
| Butterflies Are Free | 1972 | 45th | 1 | 3 |
| The Candidate | 1972 | 45th | 1 | 2 |
| The Discreet Charm of the Bourgeoisie | 1972 | 45th | 1 | 2 |
| A Christmas Carol | 1971 | 45th | 1 | 1 |
| Limelight | 1952 | 45th | 1 | 1 |
| Marjoe | 1972 | 45th | 1 | 1 |
| Norman Rockwell's World... An American Dream | 1972 | 45th | 1 | 1 |
| This Tiny World | 1972 | 45th | 1 | 1 |
| Lady Sings the Blues | 1972 | 45th | 0 | 5 |
| Sleuth | 1972 | 45th | 0 | 4 |
| Sounder | 1972 | 45th | 0 | 4 |
| Deliverance | 1972 | 45th | 0 | 3 |
| Young Winston | 1972 | 45th | 0 | 3 |
| Pete 'n' Tillie | 1972 | 45th | 0 | 2 |
| The Heartbreak Kid | 1972 | 45th | 0 | 2 |
| 1776 | 1972 | 45th | 0 | 1 |
| Ape and Super-Ape | 1972 | 45th | 0 | 1 |
| Ben | 1972 | 45th | 0 | 1 |
| Fat City | 1972 | 45th | 0 | 1 |
| Frog Story | 1972 | 45th | 0 | 1 |
| Hundertwasser's Rainy Day | 1972 | 45th | 0 | 1 |
| I Love You Rosa | 1972 | 45th | 0 | 1 |
| Images | 1972 | 45th | 0 | 1 |
| K-Z | 1972 | 45th | 0 | 1 |
| Kama Sutra Rides Again | 1971 | 45th | 0 | 1 |
| The Life and Times of Judge Roy Bean | 1972 | 45th | 0 | 1 |
| Malcolm X | 1972 | 45th | 0 | 1 |
| Man of La Mancha | 1972 | 45th | 0 | 1 |
| Manson | 1973 | 45th | 0 | 1 |
| Murmur of the Heart | 1971 | 45th | 0 | 1 |
| My Dearest Senorita | 1972 | 45th | 0 | 1 |
| Napoleon and Samantha | 1972 | 45th | 0 | 1 |
| Selling Out | 1972 | 45th | 0 | 1 |
| Solo | 1972 | 45th | 0 | 1 |
| The Dawns Here Are Quiet | 1972 | 45th | 0 | 1 |
| The Hot Rock | 1972 | 45th | 0 | 1 |
| The Little Ark | 1972 | 45th | 0 | 1 |
| The New Land | 1972 | 45th | 0 | 1 |
| The Ruling Class | 1972 | 45th | 0 | 1 |
| The Silent Revolution | 1972 | 45th | 0 | 1 |
| The Stepmother | 1972 | 45th | 0 | 1 |
| The Tide of Traffic | 1972 | 45th | 0 | 1 |
| Tup Tup | 1972 | 45th | 0 | 1 |
| **The Sting** | 1973 | 46th | 7 | 10 |
| The Exorcist | 1973 | 46th | 2 | 10 |
| The Way We Were | 1973 | 46th | 2 | 6 |
| A Touch of Class | 1973 | 46th | 1 | 5 |
| Cries and Whispers | 1972 | 46th | 1 | 5 |
| Paper Moon | 1973 | 46th | 1 | 4 |
| Save the Tiger | 1973 | 46th | 1 | 3 |
| The Paper Chase | 1973 | 46th | 1 | 3 |
| Day for Night | 1973 | 46th / 47th | 1 | 4 |
| Frank Film | 1973 | 46th | 1 | 1 |
| Princeton: A Search for Answers | 1973 | 46th | 1 | 1 |
| The Bolero | 1973 | 46th | 1 | 1 |
| The Great American Cowboy | 1973 | 46th | 1 | 1 |
| American Graffiti | 1973 | 46th | 0 | 5 |
| Cinderella Liberty | 1973 | 46th | 0 | 3 |
| The Last Detail | 1973 | 46th | 0 | 3 |
| Tom Sawyer | 1973 | 46th | 0 | 3 |
| Jonathan Livingston Seagull | 1973 | 46th | 0 | 2 |
| Last Tango in Paris | 1972 | 46th | 0 | 2 |
| Serpico | 1973 | 46th | 0 | 2 |
| Summer Wishes, Winter Dreams | 1973 | 46th | 0 | 2 |
| The Day of the Dolphin | 1973 | 46th | 0 | 2 |
| Always a New Beginning | 1974 | 46th | 0 | 1 |
| Background | 1973 | 46th | 0 | 1 |
| Bang the Drum Slowly | 1973 | 46th | 0 | 1 |
| Battle of Berlin | 1973 | 46th | 0 | 1 |
| Brother Sun, Sister Moon | 1972 | 46th | 0 | 1 |
| Christo's Valley Curtain | 1974 | 46th | 0 | 1 |
| Clockmaker | 1971 | 46th | 0 | 1 |
| Four Stones for Kanemitsu | 1973 | 46th | 0 | 1 |
| Jesus Christ Superstar | 1973 | 46th | 0 | 1 |
| Journey to the Outer Limits | 1973 | 46th | 0 | 1 |
| L'Invitation | 1973 | 46th | 0 | 1 |
| Life Times Nine | 1973 | 46th | 0 | 1 |
| Live and Let Die | 1973 | 46th | 0 | 1 |
| Ludwig | 1973 | 46th | 0 | 1 |
| Paisti ag obair | 1973 | 46th | 0 | 1 |
| Papillon | 1973 | 46th | 0 | 1 |
| Pulcinella | 1973 | 46th | 0 | 1 |
| Robin Hood | 1973 | 46th | 0 | 1 |
| The Day of the Jackal | 1973 | 46th | 0 | 1 |
| The House on Chelouche Street | 1973 | 46th | 0 | 1 |
| The Legend of John Henry | 1973 | 46th | 0 | 1 |
| The Pedestrian | 1973 | 46th | 0 | 1 |
| Turkish Delight | 1973 | 46th | 0 | 1 |
| Walls of Fire | 1971 | 46th | 0 | 1 |
| **The Godfather Part II** | 1974 | 47th | 6 | 11 |
| The Towering Inferno | 1974 | 47th | 3 | 8 |
| The Great Gatsby | 1974 | 47th | 2 | 2 |
| Chinatown | 1974 | 47th | 1 | 11 |
| Murder on the Orient Express | 1974 | 47th | 1 | 6 |
| Earthquake | 1974 | 47th | 1 (1) | 4 |
| Alice Doesn't Live Here Anymore | 1974 | 47th | 1 | 3 |
| Harry and Tonto | 1974 | 47th | 1 | 2 |
| Amarcord | 1973 | 47th / 48th | 1 | 3 |
| Closed Mondays | 1974 | 47th | 1 | 1 |
| Don't | 1974 | 47th | 1 | 1 |
| Hearts and Minds | 1974 | 47th | 1 | 1 |
| One-Eyed Men Are Kings | 1974 | 47th | 1 | 1 |
| Lenny | 1974 | 47th | 0 | 6 |
| Blazing Saddles | 1974 | 47th | 0 | 3 |
| The Conversation | 1974 | 47th | 0 | 3 |
| A Woman Under the Influence | 1974 | 47th | 0 | 2 |
| The Little Prince | 1974 | 47th | 0 | 2 |
| Young Frankenstein | 1974 | 47th | 0 | 2 |
| Antonia: A Portrait of the Woman | 1974 | 47th | 0 | 1 |
| Benji | 1974 | 47th | 0 | 1 |
| Cats' Play | 1972 | 47th | 0 | 1 |
| City Out of Wilderness | 1974 | 47th | 0 | 1 |
| Claudine | 1974 | 47th | 0 | 1 |
| Climb | 1974 | 47th | 0 | 1 |
| Daisy Miller | 1974 | 47th | 0 | 1 |
| Exploratorium | 1974 | 47th | 0 | 1 |
| Gold | 1974 | 47th | 0 | 1 |
| Hunger | 1974 | 47th | 0 | 1 |
| John Muir's High Sierra | 1974 | 47th | 0 | 1 |
| Lacombe, Lucien | 1974 | 47th | 0 | 1 |
| Naked Yoga | 1974 | 47th | 0 | 1 |
| Phantom of the Paradise | 1974 | 47th | 0 | 1 |
| Planet Ocean | 1974 | 47th | 0 | 1 |
| Shanks | 1974 | 47th | 0 | 1 |
| The 81st Blow | 1974 | 47th | 0 | 1 |
| The Apprenticeship of Duddy Kravitz | 1974 | 47th | 0 | 1 |
| The Challenge... A Tribute to Modern Art | 1974 | 47th | 0 | 1 |
| The Concert | 1974 | 47th | 0 | 1 |
| The Deluge | 1974 | 47th | 0 | 1 |
| The Family That Dwelt Apart | 1973 | 47th | 0 | 1 |
| The Island at the Top of the World | 1974 | 47th | 0 | 1 |
| The Longest Yard | 1974 | 47th | 0 | 1 |
| The Truce | 1974 | 47th | 0 | 1 |
| The Violin | 1974 | 47th | 0 | 1 |
| The Wild and the Brave | 1974 | 47th | 0 | 1 |
| Thunderbolt and Lightfoot | 1974 | 47th | 0 | 1 |
| Voyage to Next | 1974 | 47th | 0 | 1 |
| Winnie the Pooh and Tigger Too | 1974 | 47th | 0 | 1 |
| **One Flew Over the Cuckoo's Nest** | 1975 | 48th | 5 | 9 |
| Barry Lyndon | 1975 | 48th | 4 | 7 |
| Jaws | 1975 | 48th | 3 | 4 |
| Dog Day Afternoon | 1975 | 48th | 1 | 6 |
| Nashville | 1975 | 48th | 1 | 5 |
| Shampoo | 1975 | 48th | 1 | 4 |
| The Hindenburg | 1975 | 48th | 0 (2) | 3 |
| The Sunshine Boys | 1975 | 48th | 1 | 4 |
| Angel and Big Joe | 1975 | 48th | 1 | 1 |
| Dersu Uzala | 1975 | 48th | 1 | 1 |
| Great | 1975 | 48th | 1 | 1 |
| The End of the Game | 1975 | 48th | 1 | 1 |
| The Man Who Skied Down Everest | 1975 | 48th | 1 | 1 |
| Funny Lady | 1975 | 48th | 0 | 5 |
| The Man Who Would Be King | 1975 | 48th | 0 | 4 |
| Bite the Bullet | 1975 | 48th | 0 | 2 |
| Profumo di donna | 1974 | 48th | 0 | 2 |
| The Day of the Locust | 1975 | 48th | 0 | 2 |
| The Wind and the Lion | 1975 | 48th | 0 | 2 |
| Tommy | 1975 | 48th | 0 | 2 |
| A Day in the Life of Bonnie Consolo | 1975 | 48th | 0 | 1 |
| And Now My Love | 1974 | 48th | 0 | 1 |
| Arthur and Lillie | 1975 | 48th | 0 | 1 |
| Birds Do It, Bees Do It | 1974 | 48th | 0 | 1 |
| Conquest of Light | 1975 | 48th | 0 | 1 |
| Dawn Flight | 1976 | 48th | 0 | 1 |
| Doubletalk | 1975 | 48th | 0 | 1 |
| Farewell, My Lovely | 1975 | 48th | 0 | 1 |
| Fighting for Our Lives | 1975 | 48th | 0 | 1 |
| Give 'em Hell, Harry! | 1975 | 48th | 0 | 1 |
| Hedda | 1975 | 48th | 0 | 1 |
| Hester Street | 1975 | 48th | 0 | 1 |
| Kick Me | 1975 | 48th | 0 | 1 |
| Letters from Marusia | 1976 | 48th | 0 | 1 |
| Lies My Father Told Me | 1975 | 48th | 0 | 1 |
| Mahogany | 1975 | 48th | 0 | 1 |
| Millions of Years Ahead of Man | 1975 | 48th | 0 | 1 |
| Monsieur Pointu | 1975 | 48th | 0 | 1 |
| Once Is Not Enough | 1975 | 48th | 0 | 1 |
| Probes in Space | 1975 | 48th | 0 | 1 |
| Sandakan No. 8 | 1974 | 48th | 0 | 1 |
| Sisyphus | 1974 | 48th | 0 | 1 |
| The California Reich | 1975 | 48th | 0 | 1 |
| The Four Musketeers | 1974 | 48th | 0 | 1 |
| The Incredible Machine | 1975 | 48th | 0 | 1 |
| The Magic Flute | 1975 | 48th | 0 | 1 |
| The Man in the Glass Booth | 1975 | 48th | 0 | 1 |
| The Other Half of the Sky: A China Memoir | 1975 | 48th | 0 | 1 |
| The Other Side of the Mountain | 1975 | 48th | 0 | 1 |
| The Promised Land | 1975 | 48th | 0 | 1 |
| The Story of Adele H. | 1975 | 48th | 0 | 1 |
| Three Days of the Condor | 1975 | 48th | 0 | 1 |
| Whiffs | 1975 | 48th | 0 | 1 |
| Whistling Smith | 1975 | 48th | 0 | 1 |
| **Rocky** | 1976 | 49th | 3 | 10 |
| Network | 1976 | 49th | 4 | 10 |
| All the President's Men | 1976 | 49th | 4 | 8 |
| Bound for Glory | 1976 | 49th | 2 | 6 |
| A Star is Born | 1976 | 49th | 1 | 4 |
| Fellini's Casanova | 1976 | 49th | 1 | 2 |
| The Omen | 1976 | 49th | 1 | 2 |
| Black and White in Color | 1976 | 49th | 1 | 1 |
| Harlan County, USA | 1976 | 49th | 1 | 1 |
| In the Region of Ice | 1976 | 49th | 1 | 1 |
| Leisure | 1976 | 49th | 1 | 1 |
| Number Our Days | 1976 | 49th | 1 | 1 |
| Seven Beauties | 1975 | 49th | 0 | 4 |
| Taxi Driver | 1976 | 49th | 0 | 4 |
| Cousin Cousine | 1975 | 49th | 0 | 3 |
| Voyage of the Damned | 1976 | 49th | 0 | 3 |
| Carrie | 1976 | 49th | 0 | 2 |
| Face to Face | 1976 | 49th | 0 | 2 |
| King Kong | 1976 | 49th | 0 (1) | 2 |
| Logan's Run | 1976 | 49th | 0 (1) | 2 |
| The Incredible Sarah | 1976 | 49th | 0 | 2 |
| The Seven-Per-Cent Solution | 1976 | 49th | 0 | 2 |
| American Shoeshine | 1975 | 49th | 0 | 1 |
| Blackwood | 1976 | 49th | 0 | 1 |
| Bugsy Malone | 1976 | 49th | 0 | 1 |
| Dedalo | 1975 | 49th | 0 | 1 |
| Half a House | 1976 | 49th | 0 | 1 |
| Hollywood on Trial | 1976 | 49th | 0 | 1 |
| Jacob the Liar | 1974 | 49th | 0 | 1 |
| Kudzu | 1977 | 49th | 0 | 1 |
| Marathon Man | 1976 | 49th | 0 | 1 |
| Nights and Days | 1975 | 49th | 0 | 1 |
| Nightlife | 1976 | 49th | 0 | 1 |
| Number One | 1976 | 49th | 0 | 1 |
| Obsession | 1976 | 49th | 0 | 1 |
| Off the Edge | 1976 | 49th | 0 | 1 |
| People of the Wind | 1976 | 49th | 0 | 1 |
| Silver Streak | 1976 | 49th | 0 | 1 |
| The End of the Road | 1976 | 49th | 0 | 1 |
| The Front | 1976 | 49th | 0 | 1 |
| The Last Tycoon | 1976 | 49th | 0 | 1 |
| The Morning Spider | 1976 | 49th | 0 | 1 |
| The Outlaw Josey Wales | 1976 | 49th | 0 | 1 |
| The Passover Plot | 1976 | 49th | 0 | 1 |
| The Pink Panther Strikes Again | 1976 | 49th | 0 | 1 |
| The Shootist | 1976 | 49th | 0 | 1 |
| The Street | 1976 | 49th | 0 | 1 |
| Two-Minute Warning | 1976 | 49th | 0 | 1 |
| Universe | 1976 | 49th | 0 | 1 |
| Volcano: An Inquiry into the Life and Death of Malcolm Lowry | 1976 | 49th | 0 | 1 |
| **Annie Hall** | 1977 | 50th | 4 | 5 |
| Star Wars | 1977 | 50th | 6 (1) | 10 |
| Julia | 1977 | 50th | 3 | 11 |
| Close Encounters of the Third Kind | 1977 | 50th | 1 (1) | 8 |
| The Goodbye Girl | 1977 | 50th | 1 | 5 |
| A Little Night Music | 1977 | 50th | 1 | 2 |
| Gravity Is My Enemy | 1977 | 50th | 1 | 1 |
| I'll Find a Way | 1977 | 50th | 1 | 1 |
| Madame Rosa | 1977 | 50th | 1 | 1 |
| The Sand Castle | 1977 | 50th | 1 | 1 |
| Who Are the DeBolts? And Where Did They Get Nineteen Kids? | 1977 | 50th | 1 | 1 |
| You Light Up My Life | 1977 | 50th | 1 | 1 |
| The Turning Point | 1977 | 50th | 0 | 11 |
| Equus | 1977 | 50th | 0 | 3 |
| The Spy Who Loved Me | 1977 | 50th | 0 | 3 |
| A Special Day | 1977 | 50th | 0 | 2 |
| Airport '77 | 1977 | 50th | 0 | 2 |
| Looking for Mr. Goodbar | 1977 | 50th | 0 | 2 |
| Pete's Dragon | 1977 | 50th | 0 | 2 |
| That Obscure Object of Desire | 1977 | 50th | 0 | 2 |
| The Slipper and the Rose | 1976 | 50th | 0 | 2 |
| Agueda Martinez: Our People, Our Country | 1977 | 50th | 0 | 1 |
| Bead Game | 1977 | 50th | 0 | 1 |
| First Edition | 1977 | 50th | 0 | 1 |
| Floating Free | 1978 | 50th | 0 | 1 |
| High Grass Circus | 1976 | 50th | 0 | 1 |
| Homage to Chagall: The Colours of Love | 1977 | 50th | 0 | 1 |
| I Never Promised You a Rose Garden | 1977 | 50th | 0 | 1 |
| Iphigenia | 1977 | 50th | 0 | 1 |
| Islands in the Stream | 1977 | 50th | 0 | 1 |
| Jimmy the C. | 1977 | 50th | 0 | 1 |
| Mohammad, Messenger of God | 1976 | 50th | 0 | 1 |
| Notes on the Popular Arts | 1978 | 50th | 0 | 1 |
| Of Time, Tombs and Treasures | 1977 | 50th | 0 | 1 |
| Oh, God! | 1977 | 50th | 0 | 1 |
| Operation Thunderbolt | 1977 | 50th | 0 | 1 |
| Saturday Night Fever | 1977 | 50th | 0 | 1 |
| Smokey and the Bandit | 1977 | 50th | 0 | 1 |
| Sorcerer | 1977 | 50th | 0 | 1 |
| Spaceborne | 1977 | 50th | 0 | 1 |
| The Absent-Minded Waiter | 1977 | 50th | 0 | 1 |
| The Children of Theatre Street | 1977 | 50th | 0 | 1 |
| The Deep | 1977 | 50th | 0 | 1 |
| The Doonesbury Special | 1977 | 50th | 0 | 1 |
| The Late Show | 1977 | 50th | 0 | 1 |
| The Other Side of Midnight | 1977 | 50th | 0 | 1 |
| The Rescuers | 1977 | 50th | 0 | 1 |
| The Shetland Experience | 1977 | 50th | 0 | 1 |
| Union Maids | 1976 | 50th | 0 | 1 |
| **The Deer Hunter** | 1978 | 51st | 5 | 9 |
| Coming Home | 1978 | 51st | 3 | 8 |
| Midnight Express | 1978 | 51st | 2 | 6 |
| Heaven Can Wait | 1978 | 51st | 1 | 9 |
| Days of Heaven | 1978 | 51st | 1 | 4 |
| California Suite | 1978 | 51st | 1 | 3 |
| The Buddy Holly Story | 1978 | 51st | 1 | 3 |
| Death on the Nile | 1978 | 51st | 1 | 1 |
| Get Out Your Handkerchiefs | 1978 | 51st | 1 | 1 |
| Scared Straight! | 1978 | 51st | 1 | 1 |
| Special Delivery | 1978 | 51st | 1 | 1 |
| Teenage Father | 1978 | 51st | 1 | 1 |
| Thank God It's Friday | 1978 | 51st | 1 | 1 |
| The Flight of the Gossamer Condor | 1978 | 51st | 1 | 1 |
| Interiors | 1978 | 51st | 0 | 5 |
| Same Time, Next Year | 1978 | 51st | 0 | 4 |
| The Wiz | 1978 | 51st | 0 | 4 |
| An Unmarried Woman | 1978 | 51st | 0 | 3 |
| Superman | 1978 | 51st | 0 (1) | 3 |
| The Boys from Brazil | 1978 | 51st | 0 | 3 |
| Autumn Sonata | 1978 | 51st | 0 | 2 |
| A Different Approach | 1978 | 51st | 0 | 1 |
| An Encounter with Faces | 1978 | 51st | 0 | 1 |
| Bloodbrothers | 1978 | 51st | 0 | 1 |
| Caravans | 1978 | 51st | 0 | 1 |
| Comes a Horseman | 1978 | 51st | 0 | 1 |
| Foul Play | 1978 | 51st | 0 | 1 |
| Goodnight Miss Ann | 1978 | 51st | 0 | 1 |
| Grease | 1978 | 51st | 0 | 1 |
| Hooper | 1978 | 51st | 0 | 1 |
| Hungarians | 1978 | 51st | 0 | 1 |
| Mandy's Grandmother | 1979 | 51st | 0 | 1 |
| Mysterious Castles of Clay | 1978 | 51st | 0 | 1 |
| Oh My Darling | 1978 | 51st | 0 | 1 |
| Pretty Baby | 1978 | 51st | 0 | 1 |
| Raoni | 1978 | 51st | 0 | 1 |
| Rip Van Winkle | 1978 | 51st | 0 | 1 |
| Squires of San Quentin | 1978 | 51st | 0 | 1 |
| Strange Fruit | 1979 | 51st | 0 | 1 |
| The Brink's Job | 1978 | 51st | 0 | 1 |
| The Divided Trail: A Native American Odyssey | 1978 | 51st | 0 | 1 |
| The Glass Cell | 1978 | 51st | 0 | 1 |
| The Lovers' Wind (Le vent des amoureux) | 1978 | 51st | 0 | 1 |
| The Magic of Lassie | 1978 | 51st | 0 | 1 |
| The Swarm | 1978 | 51st | 0 | 1 |
| Viva Italia! | 1977 | 51st | 0 | 1 |
| White Bim Black Ear | 1977 | 51st | 0 | 1 |
| With Babies and Banners: Story of the Women's Emergency Brigade | 1979 | 51st | 0 | 1 |
| **Kramer vs. Kramer** | 1979 | 52nd | 5 | 9 |
| All That Jazz | 1979 | 52nd | 4 | 9 |
| Apocalypse Now | 1979 | 52nd | 2 | 8 |
| Norma Rae | 1979 | 52nd | 2 | 4 |
| Breaking Away | 1979 | 52nd | 1 | 5 |
| A Little Romance | 1979 | 52nd | 1 | 2 |
| Alien | 1979 | 52nd | 1 | 2 |
| Being There | 1979 | 52nd | 1 | 2 |
| Best Boy | 1979 | 52nd | 1 | 1 |
| Board and Care | 1979 | 52nd | 1 | 1 |
| Every Child | 1979 | 52nd | 1 | 1 |
| Paul Robeson: Tribute to an Artist | 1979 | 52nd | 1 | 1 |
| The Tin Drum | 1979 | 52nd | 1 | 1 |
| The China Syndrome | 1979 | 52nd | 0 | 4 |
| The Rose | 1979 | 52nd | 0 | 4 |
| 1941 | 1979 | 52nd | 0 | 3 |
| La Cage aux Folles | 1978 | 52nd | 0 | 3 |
| Star Trek: The Motion Picture | 1979 | 52nd | 0 | 3 |
| ...And Justice for All | 1979 | 52nd | 0 | 2 |
| 10 | 1979 | 52nd | 0 | 2 |
| Manhattan | 1979 | 52nd | 0 | 2 |
| Starting Over | 1979 | 52nd | 0 | 2 |
| The Black Hole | 1979 | 52nd | 0 | 2 |
| The Black Stallion | 1979 | 52nd | 0 (1) | 2 |
| The Muppet Movie | 1979 | 52nd | 0 | 2 |
| A Simple Story | 1978 | 52nd | 0 | 1 |
| Agatha | 1979 | 52nd | 0 | 1 |
| Bravery in the Field | 1979 | 52nd | 0 | 1 |
| Butch and Sundance: The Early Days | 1979 | 52nd | 0 | 1 |
| Chapter Two | 1979 | 52nd | 0 | 1 |
| Dae | 1979 | 52nd | 0 | 1 |
| Dream Doll | 1979 | 52nd | 0 | 1 |
| Generation on the Wind | 1979 | 52nd | 0 | 1 |
| Going the Distance | 1979 | 52nd | 0 | 1 |
| Ice Castles | 1978 | 52nd | 0 | 1 |
| It's So Nice to Have a Wolf Around the House | 1979 | 52nd | 0 | 1 |
| Koryo Celadon | 1979 | 52nd | 0 | 1 |
| Mama Turns 100 | 1979 | 52nd | 0 | 1 |
| Meteor | 1979 | 52nd | 0 | 1 |
| Moonraker | 1979 | 52nd | 0 | 1 |
| Nails | 1979 | 52nd | 0 | 1 |
| Oh Brother, My Brother | 1979 | 52nd | 0 | 1 |
| Remember Me | 1979 | 52nd | 0 | 1 |
| Solly's Diner | 1980 | 52nd | 0 | 1 |
| The Amityville Horror | 1979 | 52nd | 0 | 1 |
| The Champ | 1979 | 52nd | 0 | 1 |
| The Electric Horseman | 1979 | 52nd | 0 | 1 |
| The Europeans | 1979 | 52nd | 0 | 1 |
| The Killing Ground | 1979 | 52nd | 0 | 1 |
| The Maids of Wilko | 1979 | 52nd | 0 | 1 |
| The Promise | 1979 | 52nd | 0 | 1 |
| The Solar Film | 1979 | 52nd | 0 | 1 |
| The War at Home | 1979 | 52nd | 0 | 1 |
| To Forget Venice | 1979 | 52nd | 0 | 1 |
| **Ordinary People** | 1980 | 53rd | 4 | 6 |
| Tess | 1979 | 53rd | 3 | 6 |
| Raging Bull | 1980 | 53rd | 2 | 8 |
| Fame | 1980 | 53rd | 2 | 6 |
| Melvin and Howard | 1980 | 53rd | 2 | 3 |
| Coal Miner's Daughter | 1980 | 53rd | 1 | 7 |
| Star Wars Episode V: The Empire Strikes Back | 1980 | 53rd | 1 (1) | 3 |
| From Mao to Mozart: Isaac Stern in China | 1979 | 53rd | 1 | 1 |
| Karl Hess: Toward Liberty | 1980 | 53rd | 1 | 1 |
| Moscow Does Not Believe in Tears | 1980 | 53rd | 1 | 1 |
| The Dollar Bottom | 1981 | 53rd | 1 | 1 |
| The Fly | 1980 | 53rd | 1 | 1 |
| The Elephant Man | 1980 | 53rd | 0 | 8 |
| Private Benjamin | 1980 | 53rd | 0 | 3 |
| The Stunt Man | 1980 | 53rd | 0 | 3 |
| Altered States | 1980 | 53rd | 0 | 2 |
| Kagemusha | 1980 | 53rd | 0 | 2 |
| Resurrection | 1980 | 53rd | 0 | 2 |
| The Competition | 1980 | 53rd | 0 | 2 |
| The Great Santini | 1979 | 53rd | 0 | 2 |
| A Jury of Her Peers | 1980 | 53rd | 0 | 1 |
| Agee | 1980 | 53rd | 0 | 1 |
| All Nothing | 1978 | 53rd | 0 | 1 |
| Breaker Morant | 1980 | 53rd | 0 | 1 |
| Brubaker | 1980 | 53rd | 0 | 1 |
| Confidence | 1980 | 53rd | 0 | 1 |
| Don't Mess with Bill | 1980 | 53rd | 0 | 1 |
| Fall Line | 1981 | 53rd | 0 | 1 |
| Front Line | 1981 | 53rd | 0 | 1 |
| Gloria | 1980 | 53rd | 0 | 1 |
| History of the World in Three Minutes Flat | 1980 | 53rd | 0 | 1 |
| Honeysuckle Rose | 1980 | 53rd | 0 | 1 |
| Inside Moves | 1980 | 53rd | 0 | 1 |
| It's the Same World | 1980 | 53rd | 0 | 1 |
| Luther Metke at 94 | 1979 | 53rd | 0 | 1 |
| Mon Oncle D'Amerique | 1980 | 53rd | 0 | 1 |
| My Brilliant Career | 1979 | 53rd | 0 | 1 |
| Nine to Five | 1980 | 53rd | 0 | 1 |
| Somewhere in Time | 1980 | 53rd | 0 | 1 |
| The Blue Lagoon | 1980 | 53rd | 0 | 1 |
| The Day After Trinity | 1981 | 53rd | 0 | 1 |
| The Eruption of Mount St. Helens! | 1980 | 53rd | 0 | 1 |
| The Formula | 1980 | 53rd | 0 | 1 |
| The Last Metro | 1980 | 53rd | 0 | 1 |
| The Nest | 1980 | 53rd | 0 | 1 |
| The Yellow Star: The Persecution of the Jews in Europe 1933–45 | 1980 | 53rd | 0 | 1 |
| Tribute | 1980 | 53rd | 0 | 1 |
| When Time Ran Out | 1980 | 53rd | 0 | 1 |
| **Chariots of Fire** | 1981 | 54th | 4 | 7 |
| Raiders of the Lost Ark | 1981 | 54th | 4 (1) | 8 |
| Reds | 1981 | 54th | 3 | 12 |
| On Golden Pond | 1981 | 54th | 3 | 10 |
| Arthur | 1981 | 54th | 2 | 4 |
| An American Werewolf in London | 1981 | 54th | 1 | 1 |
| Close Harmony | 1981 | 54th | 1 | 1 |
| Crac | 1981 | 54th | 1 | 1 |
| Genocide | 1981 | 54th | 1 | 1 |
| Mephisto | 1981 | 54th | 1 | 1 |
| Violet | 1981 | 54th | 1 | 1 |
| Ragtime | 1981 | 54th | 0 | 8 |
| Atlantic City | 1980 | 54th | 0 | 5 |
| The French Lieutenant's Woman | 1981 | 54th | 0 | 5 |
| Absence of Malice | 1981 | 54th | 0 | 3 |
| Only When I Laugh | 1981 | 54th | 0 | 3 |
| Pennies from Heaven | 1981 | 54th | 0 | 3 |
| Dragonslayer | 1981 | 54th | 0 | 2 |
| Against Wind and Tide: A Cuban Odyssey | 1981 | 54th | 0 | 1 |
| Americas in Transition | 1981 | 54th | 0 | 1 |
| Brooklyn Bridge | 1981 | 54th | 0 | 1 |
| Couples and Robbers | 1981 | 54th | 0 | 1 |
| Eight Minutes to Midnight: A Portrait of Dr. Helen Caldicott | 1981 | 54th | 0 | 1 |
| El Salvador: Another Vietnam | 1981 | 54th | 0 | 1 |
| Endless Love | 1981 | 54th | 0 | 1 |
| Excalibur | 1981 | 54th | 0 | 1 |
| First Winter | 1981 | 54th | 0 | 1 |
| For Your Eyes Only | 1981 | 54th | 0 | 1 |
| Heartbeeps | 1981 | 54th | 0 | 1 |
| Heaven's Gate | 1980 | 54th | 0 | 1 |
| Journey for Survival | 1981 | 54th | 0 | 1 |
| Man of Iron | 1981 | 54th | 0 | 1 |
| Muddy River | 1981 | 54th | 0 | 1 |
| Outland | 1981 | 54th | 0 | 1 |
| Prince of the City | 1981 | 54th | 0 | 1 |
| See What I Say | 1981 | 54th | 0 | 1 |
| The Boat Is Full | 1981 | 54th | 0 | 1 |
| The Creation | 1981 | 54th | 0 | 1 |
| The Great Muppet Caper | 1981 | 54th | 0 | 1 |
| The Tender Tale of Cinderella Penguin | 1981 | 54th | 0 | 1 |
| Three Brothers | 1981 | 54th | 0 | 1 |
| Urge to Build | 1981 | 54th | 0 | 1 |
| **Gandhi** | 1982 | 55th | 8 | 11 |
| E.T. the Extra-Terrestrial | 1982 | 55th | 4 | 9 |
| An Officer and a Gentleman | 1982 | 55th | 2 | 6 |
| Tootsie | 1982 | 55th | 1 | 10 |
| Victor/Victoria | 1982 | 55th | 1 | 7 |
| Sophie's Choice | 1982 | 55th | 1 | 5 |
| Missing | 1982 | 55th | 1 | 4 |
| A Shocking Accident | 1982 | 55th | 1 | 1 |
| Begin the Beguine | 1982 | 55th | 1 | 1 |
| If You Love This Planet | 1982 | 55th | 1 | 1 |
| Just Another Missing Kid | 1981 | 55th | 1 | 1 |
| Quest for Fire | 1981 | 55th | 1 | 1 |
| Tango | 1981 | 55th | 1 | 1 |
| Das Boot | 1981 | 55th | 0 | 6 |
| The Verdict | 1982 | 55th | 0 | 5 |
| Poltergeist | 1982 | 55th | 0 | 3 |
| Annie | 1982 | 55th | 0 | 2 |
| Blade Runner | 1982 | 55th | 0 | 2 |
| Frances | 1982 | 55th | 0 | 2 |
| La Traviata | 1982 | 55th | 0 | 2 |
| The World According to Garp | 1982 | 55th | 0 | 2 |
| Tron | 1982 | 55th | 0 | 2 |
| A Portrait of Giselle | 1982 | 55th | 0 | 1 |
| After the Axe | 1982 | 55th | 0 | 1 |
| Alsino and the Condor | 1982 | 55th | 0 | 1 |
| Ballet Robotique | 1982 | 55th | 0 | 1 |
| Ben's Mill | 1982 | 55th | 0 | 1 |
| Best Friends | 1982 | 55th | 0 | 1 |
| Clean Slate | 1981 | 55th | 0 | 1 |
| Diner | 1982 | 55th | 0 | 1 |
| Flight of the Eagle | 1982 | 55th | 0 | 1 |
| Gods of Metal | 1982 | 55th | 0 | 1 |
| In Our Water | 1982 | 55th | 0 | 1 |
| My Favorite Year | 1982 | 55th | 0 | 1 |
| One from the Heart | 1982 | 55th | 0 | 1 |
| Private Life | 1982 | 55th | 0 | 1 |
| Rocky III | 1982 | 55th | 0 | 1 |
| Split Cherry Tree | 1982 | 55th | 0 | 1 |
| Sredni Vashtar | 1981 | 55th | 0 | 1 |
| The Best Little Whorehouse in Texas | 1982 | 55th | 0 | 1 |
| The Great Cognito | 1982 | 55th | 0 | 1 |
| The Klan: A Legacy of Hate in America | 1982 | 55th | 0 | 1 |
| The Silence | 1982 | 55th | 0 | 1 |
| The Snowman | 1982 | 55th | 0 | 1 |
| To Live or Let Die | 1982 | 55th | 0 | 1 |
| Traveling Hopefully | 1982 | 55th | 0 | 1 |
| Yes, Giorgio | 1982 | 55th | 0 | 1 |
| **Terms of Endearment** | 1983 | 56th | 5 | 11 |
| The Right Stuff | 1983 | 56th | 4 | 8 |
| Fanny and Alexander | 1982 | 56th | 4 | 6 |
| Tender Mercies | 1983 | 56th | 2 | 5 |
| Yentl | 1983 | 56th | 1 | 5 |
| Flashdance | 1983 | 56th | 1 | 4 |
| Boys and Girls | 1983 | 56th | 1 | 1 |
| Flamenco at 5:15 | 1983 | 56th | 1 | 1 |
| He Makes Me Feel Like Dancin' | 1983 | 56th | 1 | 1 |
| Sundae in New York | 1983 | 56th | 1 | 1 |
| The Year of Living Dangerously | 1982 | 56th | 1 | 1 |
| Silkwood | 1983 | 56th | 0 | 5 |
| The Dresser | 1983 | 56th | 0 | 5 |
| Cross Creek | 1983 | 56th | 0 | 4 |
| Return of the Jedi | 1983 | 56th | 0 (1) | 4 |
| Educating Rita | 1983 | 56th | 0 | 3 |
| The Big Chill | 1983 | 56th | 0 | 3 |
| WarGames | 1983 | 56th | 0 | 3 |
| Reuben, Reuben | 1983 | 56th | 0 | 2 |
| Zelig | 1983 | 56th | 0 | 2 |
| Betrayal | 1983 | 56th | 0 | 1 |
| Blue Thunder | 1983 | 56th | 0 | 1 |
| Carmen | 1983 | 56th | 0 | 1 |
| Children of Darkness | 1983 | 56th | 0 | 1 |
| Entre Nous | 1983 | 56th | 0 | 1 |
| First Contact | 1983 | 56th | 0 | 1 |
| Goodie-Two-Shoes | 1984 | 56th | 0 | 1 |
| Heart Like a Wheel | 1983 | 56th | 0 | 1 |
| In the Nuclear Shadow: What Can the Children Tell Us? | 1983 | 56th | 0 | 1 |
| Mickey's Christmas Carol | 1983 | 56th | 0 | 1 |
| Never Cry Wolf | 1983 | 56th | 0 | 1 |
| Overnight Sensation | 1984 | 56th | 0 | 1 |
| Seeing Red | 1983 | 56th | 0 | 1 |
| Sewing Woman | 1982 | 56th | 0 | 1 |
| Sound of Sunshine | 1983 | 56th | 0 | 1 |
| Spaces: The Architecture of Paul Rudolph | 1983 | 56th | 0 | 1 |
| Testament | 1983 | 56th | 0 | 1 |
| The Ball | 1983 | 56th | 0 | 1 |
| The Profession of Arms | 1983 | 56th | 0 | 1 |
| The Return of Martin Guerre | 1982 | 56th | 0 | 1 |
| The Revolt of Job | 1983 | 56th | 0 | 1 |
| The Sting II | 1983 | 56th | 0 | 1 |
| To Be or Not to Be | 1983 | 56th | 0 | 1 |
| Trading Places | 1983 | 56th | 0 | 1 |
| Under Fire | 1983 | 56th | 0 | 1 |
| You Are Free | 1983 | 56th | 0 | 1 |
| **Amadeus** | 1984 | 57th | 8 | 11 |
| The Killing Fields | 1984 | 57th | 3 | 7 |
| A Passage to India | 1984 | 57th | 2 | 11 |
| Places in the Heart | 1984 | 57th | 2 | 7 |
| Indiana Jones and the Temple of Doom | 1984 | 57th | 1 | 2 |
| Charade | 1984 | 57th | 1 | 1 |
| Dangerous Moves | 1984 | 57th | 1 | 1 |
| Purple Rain | 1984 | 57th | 1 | 1 |
| The Stone Carvers | 1984 | 57th | 1 | 1 |
| The Times of Harvey Milk | 1984 | 57th | 1 | 1 |
| The Woman in Red | 1984 | 57th | 1 | 1 |
| Up | 1984 | 57th | 1 | 1 |
| 2010: The Year We Make Contact | 1984 | 57th | 0 | 5 |
| The Natural | 1984 | 57th | 0 | 4 |
| The River | 1984 | 57th | 0 (1) | 4 |
| A Soldier's Story | 1984 | 57th | 0 | 3 |
| Greystoke: The Legend of Tarzan, Lord of the Apes | 1984 | 57th | 0 | 3 |
| Broadway Danny Rose | 1984 | 57th | 0 | 2 |
| Footloose | 1984 | 57th | 0 | 2 |
| Ghostbusters | 1984 | 57th | 0 | 2 |
| The Bostonians | 1984 | 57th | 0 | 2 |
| The Cotton Club | 1984 | 57th | 0 | 2 |
| Under the Volcano | 1984 | 57th | 0 | 2 |
| Against All Odds | 1984 | 57th | 0 | 1 |
| Beverly Hills Cop | 1984 | 57th | 0 | 1 |
| Beyond the Walls | 1985 | 57th | 0 | 1 |
| Camila | 1984 | 57th | 0 | 1 |
| Code Gray: Ethical Dilemmas in Nursing | 1984 | 57th | 0 | 1 |
| Country | 1984 | 57th | 0 | 1 |
| Doctor DeSoto | 1984 | 57th | 0 | 1 |
| Double Feature | 1984 | 57th | 0 | 1 |
| Dune | 1984 | 57th | 0 | 1 |
| High Schools | 1984 | 57th | 0 | 1 |
| In the Name of the People | 1985 | 57th | 0 | 1 |
| Marlene | 1984 | 57th | 0 | 1 |
| Paradise | 1984 | 57th | 0 | 1 |
| Recollections of Pavlovsk | 1984 | 57th | 0 | 1 |
| Romancing the Stone | 1984 | 57th | 0 | 1 |
| Songwriter | 1984 | 57th | 0 | 1 |
| Splash | 1984 | 57th | 0 | 1 |
| Starman | 1984 | 57th | 0 | 1 |
| Streetwise | 1984 | 57th | 0 | 1 |
| Swing Shift | 1984 | 57th | 0 | 1 |
| Tales of Meeting and Parting | 1985 | 57th | 0 | 1 |
| The Children of Soong Ching Ling | 1984 | 57th | 0 | 1 |
| The Garden of Eden | 1984 | 57th | 0 | 1 |
| The Karate Kid | 1984 | 57th | 0 | 1 |
| The Muppets Take Manhattan | 1984 | 57th | 0 | 1 |
| El Norte | 1983 | 57th | 0 | 1 |
| The Painted Door | 1984 | 57th | 0 | 1 |
| The Pope of Greenwich Village | 1984 | 57th | 0 | 1 |
| Wartime Romance | 1983 | 57th | 0 | 1 |
| **Out of Africa** | 1985 | 58th | 7 | 11 |
| Witness | 1985 | 58th | 2 | 8 |
| Cocoon | 1985 | 58th | 2 | 2 |
| Prizzi's Honor | 1985 | 58th | 1 | 8 |
| Back to the Future | 1985 | 58th | 1 | 4 |
| Kiss of the Spider Woman | 1985 | 58th | 1 | 4 |
| Ran | 1985 | 58th | 1 | 4 |
| The Official Story | 1985 | 58th | 1 | 2 |
| The Trip to Bountiful | 1985 | 58th | 1 | 2 |
| White Nights | 1985 | 58th | 1 | 2 |
| Anna & Bella | 1984 | 58th | 1 | 1 |
| Broken Rainbow | 1985 | 58th | 1 | 1 |
| Mask | 1985 | 58th | 1 | 1 |
| Molly's Pilgrim | 1985 | 58th | 1 | 1 |
| Witness to War: Dr. Charlie Clements | 1985 | 58th | 1 | 1 |
| The Color Purple | 1985 | 58th | 0 | 11 |
| A Chorus Line | 1985 | 58th | 0 | 3 |
| Agnes of God | 1985 | 58th | 0 | 3 |
| Runaway Train | 1985 | 58th | 0 | 3 |
| Brazil | 1985 | 58th | 0 | 2 |
| Ladyhawke | 1985 | 58th | 0 | 2 |
| Murphy's Romance | 1985 | 58th | 0 | 2 |
| Silverado | 1985 | 58th | 0 | 2 |
| Angry Harvest | 1985 | 58th | 0 | 1 |
| Colonel Redl | 1985 | 58th | 0 | 1 |
| Graffiti | 1985 | 58th | 0 | 1 |
| Jagged Edge | 1985 | 58th | 0 | 1 |
| Keats and His Nightingale: A Blind Date | 1985 | 58th | 0 | 1 |
| Making Overtures: The Story of a Community Orchestra | 1985 | 58th | 0 | 1 |
| Rainbow War | 1985 | 58th | 0 | 1 |
| Rambo: First Blood Part II | 1985 | 58th | 0 | 1 |
| Remo Williams: The Adventure Begins | 1985 | 58th | 0 | 1 |
| Return to Oz | 1985 | 58th | 0 | 1 |
| Second Class Mail | 1985 | 58th | 0 | 1 |
| Soldiers in Hiding | 1985 | 58th | 0 | 1 |
| Sweet Dreams | 1985 | 58th | 0 | 1 |
| The Big Snit | 1985 | 58th | 0 | 1 |
| The Courage to Care | 1985 | 58th | 0 | 1 |
| The Journey of Natty Gann | 1985 | 58th | 0 | 1 |
| The Mothers of Plaza de Mayo | 1985 | 58th | 0 | 1 |
| The Purple Rose of Cairo | 1985 | 58th | 0 | 1 |
| The Statue of Liberty | 1985 | 58th | 0 | 1 |
| The Wizard of the Strings | 1985 | 58th | 0 | 1 |
| Three Men and a Cradle | 1985 | 58th | 0 | 1 |
| Twice in a Lifetime | 1985 | 58th | 0 | 1 |
| Unfinished Business | 1986 | 58th | 0 | 1 |
| When Father Was Away on Business | 1985 | 58th | 0 | 1 |
| Young Sherlock Holmes | 1985 | 58th | 0 | 1 |
| **Platoon** | 1986 | 59th | 4 | 8 |
| A Room with a View | 1985 | 59th | 3 | 8 |
| Hannah and Her Sisters | 1986 | 59th | 3 | 7 |
| Aliens | 1986 | 59th | 2 | 7 |
| The Mission | 1986 | 59th | 1 | 7 |
| Children of a Lesser God | 1986 | 59th | 1 | 5 |
| The Color of Money | 1986 | 59th | 1 | 4 |
| Top Gun | 1986 | 59th | 1 | 4 |
| Round Midnight | 1986 | 59th | 1 | 2 |
| A Greek Tragedy | 1985 | 59th | 1 | 1 |
| Artie Shaw: Time Is All You've Got | 1985 | 59th | 1 | 1 |
| Down and Out in America | 1986 | 59th | 1 | 1 |
| Precious Images | 1986 | 59th | 1 | 1 |
| The Assault | 1986 | 59th | 1 | 1 |
| The Fly | 1986 | 59th | 1 | 1 |
| Women – for America, for the World | 1986 | 59th | 1 | 1 |
| Star Trek IV: The Voyage Home | 1986 | 59th | 0 | 4 |
| Crimes of the Heart | 1986 | 59th | 0 | 3 |
| Peggy Sue Got Married | 1986 | 59th | 0 | 3 |
| Hoosiers | 1986 | 59th | 0 | 2 |
| Little Shop of Horrors | 1986 | 59th | 0 | 2 |
| Salvador | 1986 | 59th | 0 | 2 |
| '38 – Vienna Before the Fall | 1986 | 59th | 0 | 1 |
| An American Tail | 1986 | 59th | 0 | 1 |
| Betty Blue | 1986 | 59th | 0 | 1 |
| Blue Velvet | 1986 | 59th | 0 | 1 |
| Chile: Hasta Cuando? | 1986 | 59th | 0 | 1 |
| Crocodile Dundee | 1986 | 59th | 0 | 1 |
| Debonair Dancers | 1986 | 59th | 0 | 1 |
| Exit | 1986 | 59th | 0 | 1 |
| Heartbreak Ridge | 1986 | 59th | 0 | 1 |
| Isaac in America: A Journey with Isaac Bashevis Singer | 1986 | 59th | 0 | 1 |
| Legend | 1985 | 59th | 0 | 1 |
| Love Struck | 1986 | 59th | 0 | 1 |
| Luxo Jr. | 1986 | 59th | 0 | 1 |
| Mona Lisa | 1986 | 59th | 0 | 1 |
| My Beautiful Laundrette | 1985 | 59th | 0 | 1 |
| My Sweet Little Village | 1985 | 59th | 0 | 1 |
| Otello | 1986 | 59th | 0 | 1 |
| Pirates | 1986 | 59th | 0 | 1 |
| Poltergeist II: The Other Side | 1986 | 59th | 0 | 1 |
| Red Grooms: Sunflower in a Hothouse | 1986 | 59th | 0 | 1 |
| Sam | 1986 | 59th | 0 | 1 |
| Stand by Me | 1986 | 59th | 0 | 1 |
| That's Life! | 1986 | 59th | 0 | 1 |
| The Clan of the Cave Bear | 1986 | 59th | 0 | 1 |
| The Decline of the American Empire | 1986 | 59th | 0 | 1 |
| The Frog, the Dog and the Devil | 1986 | 59th | 0 | 1 |
| The Karate Kid Part II | 1986 | 59th | 0 | 1 |
| The Masters of Disaster | 1986 | 59th | 0 | 1 |
| The Morning After | 1986 | 59th | 0 | 1 |
| Witness to Apartheid | 1986 | 59th | 0 | 1 |
| **The Last Emperor** | 1987 | 60th | 9 | 9 |
| Moonstruck | 1987 | 60th | 3 | 6 |
| The Untouchables | 1987 | 60th | 1 | 4 |
| Babette's Feast | 1987 | 60th | 1 | 1 |
| Dirty Dancing | 1987 | 60th | 1 | 1 |
| Harry and the Hendersons | 1987 | 60th | 1 | 1 |
| Innerspace | 1987 | 60th | 1 | 1 |
| Ray's Male Heterosexual Dance Hall | 1987 | 60th | 1 | 1 |
| The Man Who Planted Trees | 1987 | 60th | 1 | 1 |
| The Ten-Year Lunch: The Wit and Legend of the Algonquin Round Table | 1987 | 60th | 1 | 1 |
| Wall Street | 1987 | 60th | 1 | 1 |
| Young at Heart | 1987 | 60th | 1 | 1 |
| Broadcast News | 1987 | 60th | 0 | 7 |
| Empire of the Sun | 1987 | 60th | 0 | 6 |
| Fatal Attraction | 1987 | 60th | 0 | 6 |
| Hope and Glory | 1987 | 60th | 0 | 5 |
| Cry Freedom | 1987 | 60th | 0 | 3 |
| Au revoir les enfants | 1987 | 60th | 0 | 2 |
| Ironweed | 1987 | 60th | 0 | 2 |
| My Life as a Dog | 1985 | 60th | 0 | 2 |
| Radio Days | 1987 | 60th | 0 | 2 |
| RoboCop | 1987 | 60th | 0 (1) | 2 |
| The Dead | 1987 | 60th | 0 | 2 |
| The Witches of Eastwick | 1987 | 60th | 0 | 2 |
| A Stitch for Time | 1987 | 60th | 0 | 1 |
| Anna | 1987 | 60th | 0 | 1 |
| Beverly Hills Cop II | 1987 | 60th | 0 | 1 |
| Course Completed | 1987 | 60th | 0 | 1 |
| Dark Eyes | 1987 | 60th | 0 | 1 |
| Eyes on the Prize: America's Civil Rights Years/Bridge to Freedom 1965 | 1987 | 60th | 0 | 1 |
| Frances Steloff: Memoirs of a Bookseller | 1987 | 60th | 0 | 1 |
| Full Metal Jacket | 1987 | 60th | 0 | 1 |
| Gaby: A True Story | 1987 | 60th | 0 | 1 |
| George and Rosemary | 1987 | 60th | 0 | 1 |
| Good Morning, Vietnam | 1987 | 60th | 0 | 1 |
| Happy New Year | 1987 | 60th | 0 | 1 |
| Hellfire: A Journey from Hiroshima | 1986 | 60th | 0 | 1 |
| In the Wee Wee Hours... | 1987 | 60th | 0 | 1 |
| Language Says It All | 1987 | 60th | 0 | 1 |
| Lethal Weapon | 1987 | 60th | 0 | 1 |
| Making Waves | 1987 | 60th | 0 | 1 |
| Mannequin | 1987 | 60th | 0 | 1 |
| Matewan | 1987 | 60th | 0 | 1 |
| Maurice | 1987 | 60th | 0 | 1 |
| Pathfinder | 1987 | 60th | 0 | 1 |
| Predator | 1987 | 60th | 0 | 1 |
| Radio Bikini | 1988 | 60th | 0 | 1 |
| Shoeshine | 1987 | 60th | 0 | 1 |
| Silver into Gold | 1987 | 60th | 0 | 1 |
| Street Smart | 1987 | 60th | 0 | 1 |
| The Family | 1987 | 60th | 0 | 1 |
| The Princess Bride | 1987 | 60th | 0 | 1 |
| The Whales of August | 1987 | 60th | 0 | 1 |
| Throw Momma from the Train | 1987 | 60th | 0 | 1 |
| Your Face | 1987 | 60th | 0 | 1 |
| **Rain Man** | 1988 | 61st | 4 | 8 |
| Dangerous Liaisons | 1988 | 61st | 3 | 7 |
| Who Framed Roger Rabbit | 1988 | 61st | 3 (1) | 6 |
| Mississippi Burning | 1988 | 61st | 1 | 7 |
| Working Girl | 1988 | 61st | 1 | 6 |
| The Accidental Tourist | 1988 | 61st | 1 | 4 |
| A Fish Called Wanda | 1988 | 61st | 1 | 3 |
| Pelle the Conqueror | 1987 | 61st | 1 | 2 |
| Beetlejuice | 1988 | 61st | 1 | 1 |
| Bird | 1988 | 61st | 1 | 1 |
| Hotel Terminus: The Life and Times of Klaus Barbie | 1988 | 61st | 1 | 1 |
| The Accused | 1988 | 61st | 1 | 1 |
| The Appointments of Dennis Jennings | 1988 | 61st | 1 | 1 |
| The Milagro Beanfield War | 1988 | 61st | 1 | 1 |
| Tin Toy | 1988 | 61st | 1 | 1 |
| You Don't Have to Die | 1988 | 61st | 1 | 1 |
| Gorillas in the Mist | 1988 | 61st | 0 | 5 |
| Die Hard | 1988 | 61st | 0 | 4 |
| Tucker: The Man and His Dream | 1988 | 61st | 0 | 3 |
| Big | 1988 | 61st | 0 | 2 |
| Coming to America | 1988 | 61st | 0 | 2 |
| Little Dorrit | 1987 | 61st | 0 | 2 |
| Running on Empty | 1988 | 61st | 0 | 2 |
| The Unbearable Lightness of Being | 1988 | 61st | 0 | 2 |
| Willow | 1988 | 61st | 0 | 2 |
| A Cry in the Dark | 1988 | 61st | 0 | 1 |
| A Handful of Dust | 1988 | 61st | 0 | 1 |
| Bagdad Cafe | 1987 | 61st | 0 | 1 |
| Beaches | 1988 | 61st | 0 | 1 |
| Bull Durham | 1988 | 61st | 0 | 1 |
| Buster | 1988 | 61st | 0 | 1 |
| Cadillac Dreams | 1988 | 61st | 0 | 1 |
| Family Gathering | 1988 | 61st | 0 | 1 |
| Gang Cops | 1988 | 61st | 0 | 1 |
| Gullah Tales | 1988 | 61st | 0 | 1 |
| Hanussen | 1988 | 61st | 0 | 1 |
| Let's Get Lost | 1988 | 61st | 0 | 1 |
| Married to the Mob | 1988 | 61st | 0 | 1 |
| Portrait of Imogen | 1988 | 61st | 0 | 1 |
| Promises to Keep | 1988 | 61st | 0 | 1 |
| Salaam Bombay! | 1988 | 61st | 0 | 1 |
| Scrooged | 1988 | 61st | 0 | 1 |
| Stand and Deliver | 1988 | 61st | 0 | 1 |
| Sunset | 1988 | 61st | 0 | 1 |
| Technological Threat | 1988 | 61st | 0 | 1 |
| Tequila Sunrise | 1988 | 61st | 0 | 1 |
| The Cat Came Back | 1988 | 61st | 0 | 1 |
| The Children's Storefront | 1988 | 61st | 0 | 1 |
| The Cry of Reason: Beyers Naude - An Afrikaner Speaks Out | 1988 | 61st | 0 | 1 |
| The Last Temptation of Christ | 1988 | 61st | 0 | 1 |
| The Music Teacher | 1988 | 61st | 0 | 1 |
| Who Killed Vincent Chin? | 1987 | 61st | 0 | 1 |
| Women on the Verge of a Nervous Breakdown | 1988 | 61st | 0 | 1 |
| **Driving Miss Daisy** | 1989 | 62nd | 4 | 9 |
| Glory | 1989 | 62nd | 3 | 5 |
| Born on the Fourth of July | 1989 | 62nd | 2 | 8 |
| My Left Foot | 1989 | 62nd | 2 | 5 |
| The Little Mermaid | 1989 | 62nd | 2 | 3 |
| Dead Poets Society | 1989 | 62nd | 1 | 4 |
| The Abyss | 1989 | 62nd | 1 | 4 |
| Henry V | 1989 | 62nd | 1 | 3 |
| Indiana Jones and the Last Crusade | 1989 | 62nd | 1 | 3 |
| Balance | 1989 | 62nd | 1 | 1 |
| Batman | 1989 | 62nd | 1 | 1 |
| Cinema Paradiso | 1988 | 62nd | 1 | 1 |
| Common Threads: Stories from the Quilt | 1989 | 62nd | 1 | 1 |
| The Johnstown Flood | 1989 | 62nd | 1 | 1 |
| Work Experience | 1989 | 62nd | 1 | 1 |
| The Adventures of Baron Munchausen | 1988 | 62nd | 0 | 4 |
| The Fabulous Baker Boys | 1989 | 62nd | 0 | 4 |
| Crimes and Misdemeanors | 1989 | 62nd | 0 | 3 |
| Enemies, A Love Story | 1989 | 62nd | 0 | 3 |
| Field of Dreams | 1989 | 62nd | 0 | 3 |
| Black Rain | 1989 | 62nd | 0 | 2 |
| Camille Claudel | 1988 | 62nd | 0 | 2 |
| Do the Right Thing | 1989 | 62nd | 0 | 2 |
| Parenthood | 1989 | 62nd | 0 | 2 |
| Shirley Valentine | 1989 | 62nd | 0 | 2 |
| A Dry White Season | 1989 | 62nd | 0 | 1 |
| Adam Clayton Powell | 1989 | 62nd | 0 | 1 |
| Amazon Diary | 1989 | 62nd | 0 | 1 |
| Back to the Future Part II | 1989 | 62nd | 0 | 1 |
| Blaze | 1989 | 62nd | 0 | 1 |
| Chances Are | 1989 | 62nd | 0 | 1 |
| Crack USA: County Under Siege | 1989 | 62nd | 0 | 1 |
| Dad | 1989 | 62nd | 0 | 1 |
| Fine Food, Fine Pastries, Open 6 to 9 | 1989 | 62nd | 0 | 1 |
| For All Mankind | 1989 | 62nd | 0 | 1 |
| Harlem Nights | 1989 | 62nd | 0 | 1 |
| Jesus of Montreal | 1989 | 62nd | 0 | 1 |
| Lethal Weapon 2 | 1989 | 62nd | 0 | 1 |
| Memories of a Marriage | 1989 | 62nd | 0 | 1 |
| Music Box | 1989 | 62nd | 0 | 1 |
| Sex, Lies, and Videotape | 1989 | 62nd | 0 | 1 |
| Steel Magnolias | 1989 | 62nd | 0 | 1 |
| Super Chief: The Life and Legacy of Earl Warren | 1989 | 62nd | 0 | 1 |
| The Bear | 1988 | 62nd | 0 | 1 |
| The Childeater | 1989 | 62nd | 0 | 1 |
| The Cow | 1989 | 62nd | 0 | 1 |
| The Hill Farm | 1989 | 62nd | 0 | 1 |
| Valmont | 1989 | 62nd | 0 | 1 |
| What Happened to Santiago | 1989 | 62nd | 0 | 1 |
| When Harry Met Sally... | 1989 | 62nd | 0 | 1 |
| Yad Vashem: Preserving the Past to Ensure the Future | 1989 | 62nd | 0 | 1 |
| **Dances With Wolves** | 1990 | 63rd | 7 | 12 |
| Dick Tracy | 1990 | 63rd | 3 | 7 |
| Ghost | 1990 | 63rd | 2 | 5 |
| Goodfellas | 1990 | 63rd | 1 | 6 |
| Cyrano de Bergerac | 1990 | 63rd | 1 | 5 |
| Reversal of Fortune | 1990 | 63rd | 1 | 3 |
| The Hunt for Red October | 1990 | 63rd | 1 | 3 |
| American Dream | 1990 | 63rd | 1 | 1 |
| Creature Comforts | 1989 | 63rd | 1 | 1 |
| Days of Waiting: The Life & Art of Estelle Ishigo | 1990 | 63rd | 1 | 1 |
| Journey of Hope | 1990 | 63rd | 1 | 1 |
| Misery | 1990 | 63rd | 1 | 1 |
| The Lunch Date | 1989 | 63rd | 1 | 1 |
| The Godfather Part III | 1990 | 63rd | 0 | 7 |
| Avalon | 1990 | 63rd | 0 | 4 |
| The Grifters | 1990 | 63rd | 0 | 4 |
| Awakenings | 1990 | 63rd | 0 | 3 |
| Hamlet | 1990 | 63rd | 0 | 2 |
| Home Alone | 1990 | 63rd | 0 | 2 |
| Postcards from the Edge | 1990 | 63rd | 0 | 2 |
| Total Recall | 1990 | 63rd | 0 (1) | 2 |
| 12:01 pm | 1990 | 63rd | 0 | 1 |
| A Grand Day Out | 1989 | 63rd | 0 | 1 |
| Alice | 1990 | 63rd | 0 | 1 |
| Berkeley in the Sixties | 1990 | 63rd | 0 | 1 |
| Bronx Cheers | 1991 | 63rd | 0 | 1 |
| Building Bombs | 1990 | 63rd | 0 | 1 |
| Burning Down Tomorrow | 1990 | 63rd | 0 | 1 |
| Chimps: So Like Us | 1990 | 63rd | 0 | 1 |
| Days of Thunder | 1990 | 63rd | 0 | 1 |
| Dear Rosie | 1990 | 63rd | 0 | 1 |
| Edward Scissorhands | 1990 | 63rd | 0 | 1 |
| Flatliners | 1990 | 63rd | 0 | 1 |
| Forever Activists: Stories from the Veterans of the Abraham Lincoln Brigade | 1990 | 63rd | 0 | 1 |
| Grasshoppers (Cavallette) | 1990 | 63rd | 0 | 1 |
| Green Card | 1990 | 63rd | 0 | 1 |
| Havana | 1990 | 63rd | 0 | 1 |
| Henry & June | 1990 | 63rd | 0 | 1 |
| Journey into Life: The World of the Unborn | 1990 | 63rd | 0 | 1 |
| Ju Dou | 1990 | 63rd | 0 | 1 |
| Longtime Companion | 1989 | 63rd | 0 | 1 |
| Metropolitan | 1990 | 63rd | 0 | 1 |
| Mr. and Mrs. Bridge | 1990 | 63rd | 0 | 1 |
| Open Doors | 1990 | 63rd | 0 | 1 |
| Pretty Woman | 1990 | 63rd | 0 | 1 |
| Rose Kennedy: A Life to Remember | 1990 | 63rd | 0 | 1 |
| Senzeni Na? (What Have We Done?) | 1990 | 63rd | 0 | 1 |
| The Field | 1990 | 63rd | 0 | 1 |
| The Nasty Girl | 1990 | 63rd | 0 | 1 |
| Waldo Salt: A Screenwriter's Journey | 1990 | 63rd | 0 | 1 |
| Wild at Heart | 1990 | 63rd | 0 | 1 |
| Young Guns II | 1990 | 63rd | 0 | 1 |
| **The Silence of the Lambs** | 1991 | 64th | 5 | 7 |
| Terminator 2: Judgment Day | 1991 | 64th | 4 | 6 |
| Bugsy | 1991 | 64th | 2 | 10 |
| JFK | 1991 | 64th | 2 | 8 |
| Beauty and the Beast | 1991 | 64th | 2 | 6 |
| Thelma & Louise | 1991 | 64th | 1 | 6 |
| The Fisher King | 1991 | 64th | 1 | 5 |
| City Slickers | 1991 | 64th | 1 | 1 |
| Deadly Deception: General Electric, Nuclear Weapons and Our Environment | 1991 | 64th | 1 | 1 |
| In the Shadow of the Stars | 1991 | 64th | 1 | 1 |
| Manipulation | 1991 | 64th | 1 | 1 |
| Mediterraneo | 1991 | 64th | 1 | 1 |
| Session Man | 1991 | 64th | 1 | 1 |
| The Prince of Tides | 1991 | 64th | 0 | 7 |
| Hook | 1991 | 64th | 0 | 5 |
| Backdraft | 1991 | 64th | 0 | 3 |
| Barton Fink | 1991 | 64th | 0 | 3 |
| Boyz n the Hood | 1991 | 64th | 0 | 2 |
| Cape Fear | 1991 | 64th | 0 | 2 |
| Fried Green Tomatoes | 1991 | 64th | 0 | 2 |
| Rambling Rose | 1991 | 64th | 0 | 2 |
| Star Trek VI: The Undiscovered Country | 1991 | 64th | 0 | 2 |
| A Little Vicious | 1991 | 64th | 0 | 1 |
| Birch Street Gym | 1991 | 64th | 0 | 1 |
| Birdnesters of Thailand | 1991 | 64th | 0 | 1 |
| Blackfly | 1991 | 64th | 0 | 1 |
| Children of Nature | 1991 | 64th | 0 | 1 |
| Death on the Job | 1991 | 64th | 0 | 1 |
| Doing Time: Life Inside the Big House | 1991 | 64th | 0 | 1 |
| Europa Europa | 1990 | 64th | 0 | 1 |
| For the Boys | 1991 | 64th | 0 | 1 |
| Grand Canyon | 1991 | 64th | 0 | 1 |
| Last Breeze of Summer | 1991 | 64th | 0 | 1 |
| Madame Bovary | 1991 | 64th | 0 | 1 |
| Memorial: Letters from American Soldiers | 1991 | 64th | 0 | 1 |
| Raise the Red Lantern | 1991 | 64th | 0 | 1 |
| Robin Hood: Prince of Thieves | 1991 | 64th | 0 | 1 |
| Strings | 1991 | 64th | 0 | 1 |
| The Addams Family | 1991 | 64th | 0 | 1 |
| The Commitments | 1991 | 64th | 0 | 1 |
| The Elementary School | 1991 | 64th | 0 | 1 |
| The Mark of the Maker | 1991 | 64th | 0 | 1 |
| The Ox | 1992 | 64th | 0 | 1 |
| The Restless Conscience: Resistance to Hitler Within Germany 1933–1945 | 1992 | 64th | 0 | 1 |
| Wild by Law | 1991 | 64th | 0 | 1 |
| **Unforgiven** | 1992 | 65th | 4 | 9 |
| Howards End | 1992 | 65th | 3 | 9 |
| Bram Stoker's Dracula | 1992 | 65th | 3 | 4 |
| Aladdin | 1992 | 65th | 2 | 5 |
| The Crying Game | 1992 | 65th | 1 | 6 |
| Scent of a Woman | 1992 | 65th | 1 | 4 |
| A River Runs Through It | 1992 | 65th | 1 | 3 |
| Indochine | 1992 | 65th | 1 | 2 |
| Death Becomes Her | 1992 | 65th | 1 | 1 |
| Educating Peter | 1992 | 65th | 1 | 1 |
| Mona Lisa Descending a Staircase | 1992 | 65th | 1 | 1 |
| My Cousin Vinny | 1992 | 65th | 1 | 1 |
| Omnibus | 1992 | 65th | 1 | 1 |
| The Last of the Mohicans | 1992 | 65th | 1 | 1 |
| The Panama Deception | 1992 | 65th | 1 | 1 |
| A Few Good Men | 1992 | 65th | 0 | 4 |
| Chaplin | 1992 | 65th | 0 | 3 |
| Enchanted April | 1991 | 65th | 0 | 3 |
| The Player | 1992 | 65th | 0 | 3 |
| Basic Instinct | 1992 | 65th | 0 | 2 |
| Batman Returns | 1992 | 65th | 0 | 2 |
| Hoffa | 1992 | 65th | 0 | 2 |
| Husbands and Wives | 1992 | 65th | 0 | 2 |
| Lorenzo's Oil | 1992 | 65th | 0 | 2 |
| Malcolm X | 1992 | 65th | 0 | 2 |
| Passion Fish | 1992 | 65th | 0 | 2 |
| The Bodyguard | 1992 | 65th | 0 | 2 |
| Toys | 1992 | 65th | 0 | 2 |
| Under Siege | 1992 | 65th | 0 | 2 |
| Adam | 1992 | 65th | 0 | 1 |
| Alien 3 | 1992 | 65th | 0 | 1 |
| At the Edge of Conquest: The Journey of Chief Wai-Wai | 1992 | 65th | 0 | 1 |
| Beyond Imagining: Margaret Anderson and the 'Little Review' | 1992 | 65th | 0 | 1 |
| Changing Our Minds: The Story of Dr. Evelyn Hooker | 1992 | 65th | 0 | 1 |
| Close to Eden | 1991 | 65th | 0 | 1 |
| Contact | 1992 | 65th | 0 | 1 |
| Cruise Control | 1992 | 65th | 0 | 1 |
| Daens | 1992 | 65th | 0 | 1 |
| Damage | 1992 | 65th | 0 | 1 |
| Fires of Kuwait | 1992 | 65th | 0 | 1 |
| Glengarry Glen Ross | 1992 | 65th | 0 | 1 |
| The Liberators: Fighting on Two Fronts in World War II | 1992 | 65th | 0 | 1 |
| Love Field | 1992 | 65th | 0 | 1 |
| Mr. Saturday Night | 1992 | 65th | 0 | 1 |
| Music for the Movies: Bernard Herrmann | 1992 | 65th | 0 | 1 |
| Reci, reci, reci | 1992 | 65th | 0 | 1 |
| Schtonk! | 1992 | 65th | 0 | 1 |
| Screen Play | 1993 | 65th | 0 | 1 |
| Swan Song | 1992 | 65th | 0 | 1 |
| The Colours of My Father: A Portrait of Sam Borenstein | 1992 | 65th | 0 | 1 |
| The Lady in Waiting | 1992 | 65th | 0 | 1 |
| The Lover | 1992 | 65th | 0 | 1 |
| The Mambo Kings | 1992 | 65th | 0 | 1 |
| The Sandman | 1991 | 65th | 0 | 1 |
| When Abortion Was Illegal: Untold Stories | 1992 | 65th | 0 | 1 |
| A Place in the World | 1992 | 65th | 0 | 0 |
| **Schindler's List** | 1993 | 66th | 7 | 12 |
| The Piano | 1993 | 66th | 3 | 8 |
| Jurassic Park | 1993 | 66th | 3 | 3 |
| Philadelphia | 1993 | 66th | 2 | 5 |
| The Fugitive | 1993 | 66th | 1 | 7 |
| The Age of Innocence | 1993 | 66th | 1 | 5 |
| Belle Époque | 1992 | 66th | 1 | 1 |
| Defending Our Lives | 1993 | 66th | 1 | 1 |
| I Am a Promise: The Children of Stanton Elementary School | 1993 | 66th | 1 | 1 |
| Mrs. Doubtfire | 1993 | 66th | 1 | 1 |
| Schwarzfahrer | 1992 | 66th | 1 | 1 |
| The Wrong Trousers | 1993 | 66th | 1 | 1 |
| The Remains of the Day | 1993 | 66th | 0 | 8 |
| In the Name of the Father | 1993 | 66th | 0 | 7 |
| Cliffhanger | 1993 | 66th | 0 | 3 |
| In the Line of Fire | 1993 | 66th | 0 | 3 |
| Farewell My Concubine | 1993 | 66th | 0 | 2 |
| Orlando | 1992 | 66th | 0 | 2 |
| Shadowlands | 1993 | 66th | 0 | 2 |
| Sleepless in Seattle | 1993 | 66th | 0 | 2 |
| The Firm | 1993 | 66th | 0 | 2 |
| What's Love Got to Do with It | 1993 | 66th | 0 | 2 |
| Addams Family Values | 1993 | 66th | 0 | 1 |
| Beethoven's 2nd | 1993 | 66th | 0 | 1 |
| Blindscape | 1993 | 66th | 0 | 1 |
| Blood Ties: The Life and Work of Sally Mann | 1994 | 66th | 0 | 1 |
| Chicks in White Satin | 1993 | 66th | 0 | 1 |
| Children of Fate: Life and Death in a Sicilian Family | 1993 | 66th | 0 | 1 |
| Dave | 1993 | 66th | 0 | 1 |
| Down on the Waterfront | 1993 | 66th | 0 | 1 |
| Fearless | 1993 | 66th | 0 | 1 |
| For Better or For Worse | 1993 | 66th | 0 | 1 |
| Geronimo: An American Legend | 1993 | 66th | 0 | 1 |
| Hedd Wyn | 1992 | 66th | 0 | 1 |
| Partners | 1993 | 66th | 0 | 1 |
| Poetic Justice | 1993 | 66th | 0 | 1 |
| Searching for Bobby Fischer | 1993 | 66th | 0 | 1 |
| Short Cuts | 1993 | 66th | 0 | 1 |
| Six Degrees of Separation | 1993 | 66th | 0 | 1 |
| Small Talk | 1994 | 66th | 0 | 1 |
| The Broadcast Tapes of Dr. Peter | 1993 | 66th | 0 | 1 |
| The Dutch Master | 1993 | 66th | 0 | 1 |
| The Mighty River | 1993 | 66th | 0 | 1 |
| The Nightmare Before Christmas | 1993 | 66th | 0 | 1 |
| The Scent of Green Papaya | 1993 | 66th | 0 | 1 |
| The Screw (La Vis) | 1993 | 66th | 0 | 1 |
| The Village | 1993 | 66th | 0 | 1 |
| The War Room | 1993 | 66th | 0 | 1 |
| The Wedding Banquet | 1993 | 66th | 0 | 1 |
| What's Eating Gilbert Grape | 1993 | 66th | 0 | 1 |
| **Forrest Gump** | 1994 | 67th | 6 | 13 |
| The Lion King | 1994 | 67th | 2 | 4 |
| Speed | 1994 | 67th | 2 | 3 |
| Ed Wood | 1994 | 67th | 2 | 2 |
| Bullets Over Broadway | 1994 | 67th | 1 | 7 |
| Pulp Fiction | 1994 | 67th | 1 | 7 |
| The Madness of King George | 1994 | 67th | 1 | 4 |
| Legends of the Fall | 1994 | 67th | 1 | 3 |
| A Time for Justice | 1994 | 67th | 1 | 1 |
| Blue Sky | 1994 | 67th | 1 | 1 |
| Bob's Birthday | 1993 | 67th | 1 | 1 |
| Burnt by the Sun | 1994 | 67th | 1 | 1 |
| Franz Kafka's It's a Wonderful Life | 1993 | 67th | 1 | 1 |
| Maya Lin: A Strong Clear Vision | 1994 | 67th | 1 | 1 |
| The Adventures of Priscilla, Queen of the Desert | 1994 | 67th | 1 | 1 |
| Trevor | 1994 | 67th | 1 | 1 |
| The Shawshank Redemption | 1994 | 67th | 0 | 7 |
| Quiz Show | 1994 | 67th | 0 | 4 |
| Little Women | 1994 | 67th | 0 | 3 |
| Three Colours: Red | 1994 | 67th | 0 | 3 |
| Clear and Present Danger | 1994 | 67th | 0 | 2 |
| Four Weddings and a Funeral | 1994 | 67th | 0 | 2 |
| Interview with the Vampire | 1994 | 67th | 0 | 2 |
| Nobody's Fool | 1994 | 67th | 0 | 2 |
| Tom & Viv | 1994 | 67th | 0 | 2 |
| 89mm from Europe | 1993 | 67th | 0 | 1 |
| A Great Day in Harlem | 1994 | 67th | 0 | 1 |
| Before the Rain | 1994 | 67th | 0 | 1 |
| Blues Highway | 1994 | 67th | 0 | 1 |
| Complaints of a Dutiful Daughter | 1994 | 67th | 0 | 1 |
| D-Day Remembered | 1994 | 67th | 0 | 1 |
| Eat Drink Man Woman | 1994 | 67th | 0 | 1 |
| Farinelli | 1994 | 67th | 0 | 1 |
| Freedom on My Mind | 1994 | 67th | 0 | 1 |
| Heavenly Creatures | 1994 | 67th | 0 | 1 |
| Hoop Dreams | 1994 | 67th | 0 | 1 |
| Junior | 1994 | 67th | 0 | 1 |
| Kangaroo Court | 1994 | 67th | 0 | 1 |
| Mary Shelley's Frankenstein | 1994 | 67th | 0 | 1 |
| Maverick | 1994 | 67th | 0 | 1 |
| Nell | 1994 | 67th | 0 | 1 |
| On Hope | 1994 | 67th | 0 | 1 |
| La Reine Margot | 1994 | 67th | 0 | 1 |
| School of the Americas Assassins | 1994 | 67th | 0 | 1 |
| Straight from the Heart | 1994 | 67th | 0 | 1 |
| Strawberry and Chocolate | 1994 | 67th | 0 | 1 |
| Syrup | 1994 | 67th | 0 | 1 |
| The Big Story | 1994 | 67th | 0 | 1 |
| The Client | 1994 | 67th | 0 | 1 |
| The Janitor | 1994 | 67th | 0 | 1 |
| The Mask | 1994 | 67th | 0 | 1 |
| The Monk and the Fish | 1994 | 67th | 0 | 1 |
| The Paper | 1994 | 67th | 0 | 1 |
| Triangle | 1994 | 67th | 0 | 1 |
| True Lies | 1994 | 67th | 0 | 1 |
| Wyatt Earp | 1994 | 67th | 0 | 1 |
| **Braveheart** | 1995 | 68th | 5 | 10 |
| Apollo 13 | 1995 | 68th | 2 | 9 |
| Pocahontas | 1995 | 68th | 2 | 2 |
| Restoration | 1995 | 68th | 2 | 2 |
| The Usual Suspects | 1995 | 68th | 2 | 2 |
| Babe | 1995 | 68th | 1 | 7 |
| Sense and Sensibility | 1995 | 68th | 1 | 7 |
| Il Postino: The Postman | 1994 | 68th | 1 | 5 |
| Dead Man Walking | 1995 | 68th | 1 | 4 |
| Leaving Las Vegas | 1995 | 68th | 1 | 4 |
| Mighty Aphrodite | 1995 | 68th | 1 | 2 |
| A Close Shave | 1995 | 68th | 1 | 1 |
| Anne Frank Remembered | 1995 | 68th | 1 | 1 |
| Antonia's Line | 1995 | 68th | 1 | 1 |
| Lieberman in Love | 1995 | 68th | 1 | 1 |
| One Survivor Remembers | 1995 | 68th | 1 | 1 |
| Nixon | 1995 | 68th | 0 | 4 |
| Batman Forever | 1995 | 68th | 0 | 3 |
| Crimson Tide | 1995 | 68th | 0 | 3 |
| Toy Story | 1995 | 68th | 0 (1) | 3 |
| 12 Monkeys | 1995 | 68th | 0 | 2 |
| A Little Princess | 1995 | 68th | 0 | 2 |
| Richard III | 1995 | 68th | 0 | 2 |
| Sabrina | 1995 | 68th | 0 | 2 |
| All Things Fair | 1995 | 68th | 0 | 1 |
| Brooms | 1996 | 68th | 0 | 1 |
| Casino | 1995 | 68th | 0 | 1 |
| Don Juan DeMarco | 1995 | 68th | 0 | 1 |
| Duke of Groove | 1996 | 68th | 0 | 1 |
| Dust of Life | 1995 | 68th | 0 | 1 |
| Fiddlefest | 1995 | 68th | 0 | 1 |
| Gagarin | 1994 | 68th | 0 | 1 |
| Georgia | 1995 | 68th | 0 | 1 |
| Hank Aaron: Chasing the Dream | 1995 | 68th | 0 | 1 |
| Jim Dine: A Self-Portrait on the Walls | 1995 | 68th | 0 | 1 |
| Little Surprises | 1996 | 68th | 0 | 1 |
| Mr. Holland's Opus | 1995 | 68th | 0 | 1 |
| My Family, Mi Familia | 1995 | 68th | 0 | 1 |
| Never Give Up: The 20th Century Odyssey of Herbert Zipper | 1995 | 68th | 0 | 1 |
| O Quatrilho | 1995 | 68th | 0 | 1 |
| Rob Roy | 1995 | 68th | 0 | 1 |
| Roommates | 1995 | 68th | 0 | 1 |
| Runaway Brain | 1995 | 68th | 0 | 1 |
| Seven | 1995 | 68th | 0 | 1 |
| Shanghai Triad | 1995 | 68th | 0 | 1 |
| The American President | 1995 | 68th | 0 | 1 |
| The Battle Over Citizen Kane | 1996 | 68th | 0 | 1 |
| The Bridges of Madison County | 1995 | 68th | 0 | 1 |
| The Chicken from Outer Space | 1996 | 68th | 0 | 1 |
| The End | 1995 | 68th | 0 | 1 |
| The Living Sea | 1995 | 68th | 0 | 1 |
| The Shadow of Hate | 1995 | 68th | 0 | 1 |
| The Star Maker | 1995 | 68th | 0 | 1 |
| Troublesome Creek: A Midwestern | 1995 | 68th | 0 | 1 |
| Tuesday Morning Ride | 1995 | 68th | 0 | 1 |
| Unstrung Heroes | 1995 | 68th | 0 | 1 |
| Waterworld | 1995 | 68th | 0 | 1 |
| **The English Patient** | 1996 | 69th | 9 | 12 |
| Fargo | 1996 | 69th | 2 | 7 |
| Shine | 1996 | 69th | 1 | 7 |
| Evita | 1996 | 69th | 1 | 5 |
| Jerry Maguire | 1996 | 69th | 1 | 5 |
| Emma | 1996 | 69th | 1 | 2 |
| Independence Day | 1996 | 69th | 1 | 2 |
| Sling Blade | 1996 | 69th | 1 | 2 |
| Breathing Lessons: The Life and Work of Mark O'Brien | 1996 | 69th | 1 | 1 |
| Dear Diary | 1996 | 69th | 1 | 1 |
| Kolya | 1996 | 69th | 1 | 1 |
| Quest | 1996 | 69th | 1 | 1 |
| The Ghost and the Darkness | 1996 | 69th | 1 | 1 |
| The Nutty Professor | 1996 | 69th | 1 | 1 |
| When We Were Kings | 1996 | 69th | 1 | 1 |
| Secrets & Lies | 1996 | 69th | 0 | 5 |
| Hamlet | 1996 | 69th | 0 | 4 |
| Ghosts of Mississippi | 1996 | 69th | 0 | 2 |
| Michael Collins | 1996 | 69th | 0 | 2 |
| The Crucible | 1996 | 69th | 0 | 2 |
| The Mirror Has Two Faces | 1996 | 69th | 0 | 2 |
| The People vs. Larry Flynt | 1996 | 69th | 0 | 2 |
| The Portrait of a Lady | 1996 | 69th | 0 | 2 |
| Twister | 1996 | 69th | 0 | 2 |
| A Chef in Love | 1997 | 69th | 0 | 1 |
| An Essay on Matisse | 1996 | 69th | 0 | 1 |
| Angels and Insects | 1995 | 69th | 0 | 1 |
| Breaking the Waves | 1996 | 69th | 0 | 1 |
| Canhead | 1996 | 69th | 0 | 1 |
| Cosmic Voyage | 1996 | 69th | 0 | 1 |
| Daylight | 1996 | 69th | 0 | 1 |
| De tripas, corazon | 1996 | 69th | 0 | 1 |
| Dragonheart | 1996 | 69th | 0 | 1 |
| Eraser | 1996 | 69th | 0 | 1 |
| Ernst & lyset | 1996 | 69th | 0 | 1 |
| Esposados | 1996 | 69th | 0 | 1 |
| Fly Away Home | 1996 | 69th | 0 | 1 |
| James and the Giant Peach | 1996 | 69th | 0 | 1 |
| La Salla | 1996 | 69th | 0 | 1 |
| Lone Star | 1996 | 69th | 0 | 1 |
| Mandela | 1996 | 69th | 0 | 1 |
| Marvin's Room | 1996 | 69th | 0 | 1 |
| One Fine Day | 1996 | 69th | 0 | 1 |
| Primal Fear | 1996 | 69th | 0 | 1 |
| Prisoner of the Mountains | 1996 | 69th | 0 | 1 |
| Ridicule | 1996 | 69th | 0 | 1 |
| Romeo + Juliet | 1996 | 69th | 0 | 1 |
| Senza parole | 1996 | 69th | 0 | 1 |
| Sleepers | 1996 | 69th | 0 | 1 |
| Special Effects: Anything Can Happen | 1996 | 69th | 0 | 1 |
| Star Trek: First Contact | 1996 | 69th | 0 | 1 |
| Suzanne Farrell: Elusive Muse | 1996 | 69th | 0 | 1 |
| Tell the Truth and Run: George Seldes and the American Press | 1996 | 69th | 0 | 1 |
| That Thing You Do! | 1996 | 69th | 0 | 1 |
| The Birdcage | 1996 | 69th | 0 | 1 |
| The First Wives Club | 1996 | 69th | 0 | 1 |
| The Hunchback of Notre Dame | 1996 | 69th | 0 | 1 |
| The Line King: The Al Hirschfeld Story | 1996 | 69th | 0 | 1 |
| The Other Side of Sunday | 1996 | 69th | 0 | 1 |
| The Preacher's Wife | 1996 | 69th | 0 | 1 |
| The Rock | 1996 | 69th | 0 | 1 |
| The Wild Bunch: An Album in Montage | 1996 | 69th | 0 | 1 |
| Trainspotting | 1996 | 69th | 0 | 1 |
| Up Close and Personal | 1996 | 69th | 0 | 1 |
| Wat's Pig | 1996 | 69th | 0 | 1 |
| **Titanic** | 1997 | 70th | 11 | 14 |
| Good Will Hunting | 1997 | 70th | 2 | 9 |
| L.A. Confidential | 1997 | 70th | 2 | 9 |
| As Good as It Gets | 1997 | 70th | 2 | 7 |
| The Full Monty | 1997 | 70th | 1 | 4 |
| Men in Black | 1997 | 70th | 1 | 3 |
| A Story of Healing | 1997 | 70th | 1 | 1 |
| Geri's Game | 1997 | 70th | 1 | 1 |
| Karakter | 1997 | 70th | 1 | 1 |
| The Long Way Home | 1997 | 70th | 1 | 1 |
| Visas and Virtue | 1997 | 70th | 1 | 1 |
| Amistad | 1997 | 70th | 0 | 4 |
| Kundun | 1997 | 70th | 0 | 4 |
| The Wings of the Dove | 1997 | 70th | 0 | 4 |
| Boogie Nights | 1997 | 70th | 0 | 3 |
| Air Force One | 1997 | 70th | 0 | 2 |
| Anastasia | 1997 | 70th | 0 | 2 |
| Con Air | 1997 | 70th | 0 | 2 |
| Mrs. Brown | 1997 | 70th | 0 | 2 |
| The Sweet Hereafter | 1997 | 70th | 0 | 2 |
| Wag the Dog | 1997 | 70th | 0 | 2 |
| 4 Little Girls | 1997 | 70th | 0 | 1 |
| Afterglow | 1997 | 70th | 0 | 1 |
| Alaska: Spirit of the Wild | 1997 | 70th | 0 | 1 |
| Amazon | 1997 | 70th | 0 | 1 |
| Ayn Rand: A Sense of Life | 1996 | 70th | 0 | 1 |
| Beyond Silence | 1996 | 70th | 0 | 1 |
| Colors Straight Up | 1997 | 70th | 0 | 1 |
| Contact | 1997 | 70th | 0 | 1 |
| Dance Lexie Dance | 1996 | 70th | 0 | 1 |
| Deconstructing Harry | 1997 | 70th | 0 | 1 |
| Donnie Brasco | 1997 | 70th | 0 | 1 |
| Face/Off | 1997 | 70th | 0 | 1 |
| Family Video Diaries: Daughter of the Bride | 1997 | 70th | 0 | 1 |
| Famous Fred | 1996 | 70th | 0 | 1 |
| Four Days in September | 1997 | 70th | 0 | 1 |
| Gattaca | 1997 | 70th | 0 | 1 |
| Hercules | 1997 | 70th | 0 | 1 |
| In & Out | 1997 | 70th | 0 | 1 |
| It's Good to Talk | 1997 | 70th | 0 | 1 |
| Jackie Brown | 1997 | 70th | 0 | 1 |
| My Best Friend's Wedding | 1997 | 70th | 0 | 1 |
| Oscar and Lucinda | 1997 | 70th | 0 | 1 |
| Redux Riding Hood | 1997 | 70th | 0 | 1 |
| Rusalka | 1997 | 70th | 0 | 1 |
| Secrets of the Heart | 1997 | 70th | 0 | 1 |
| Starship Troopers | 1997 | 70th | 0 | 1 |
| Still Kicking: The Fabulous Palm Springs Follies | 1997 | 70th | 0 | 1 |
| Sweethearts? | 1997 | 70th | 0 | 1 |
| The Apostle | 1997 | 70th | 0 | 1 |
| The Fifth Element | 1997 | 70th | 0 | 1 |
| The Lost World: Jurassic Park | 1997 | 70th | 0 | 1 |
| The Old Lady and the Pigeons | 1997 | 70th | 0 | 1 |
| The Thief | 1997 | 70th | 0 | 1 |
| Ulee's Gold | 1997 | 70th | 0 | 1 |
| Waco: The Rules of Engagement | 1997 | 70th | 0 | 1 |
| Wolfgang | 1997 | 70th | 0 | 1 |
| **Shakespeare in Love** | 1998 | 71st | 7 | 13 |
| Saving Private Ryan | 1998 | 71st | 5 | 11 |
| Life Is Beautiful | 1997 | 71st | 3 | 7 |
| Elizabeth | 1998 | 71st | 1 | 7 |
| Gods and Monsters | 1998 | 71st | 1 | 3 |
| Affliction | 1997 | 71st | 1 | 2 |
| The Prince of Egypt | 1998 | 71st | 1 | 2 |
| What Dreams May Come | 1998 | 71st | 1 | 2 |
| Bunny | 1998 | 71st | 1 | 1 |
| Election Night | 1998 | 71st | 1 | 1 |
| The Last Days | 1998 | 71st | 1 | 1 |
| The Personals: Improvisations on Romance in the Golden Years | 1998 | 71st | 1 | 1 |
| The Thin Red Line | 1998 | 71st | 0 | 7 |
| Armageddon | 1998 | 71st | 0 | 4 |
| Pleasantville | 1998 | 71st | 0 | 3 |
| The Truman Show | 1998 | 71st | 0 | 3 |
| A Civil Action | 1998 | 71st | 0 | 2 |
| A Simple Plan | 1998 | 71st | 0 | 2 |
| Central Station | 1998 | 71st | 0 | 2 |
| Hilary and Jackie | 1998 | 71st | 0 | 2 |
| Out of Sight | 1998 | 71st | 0 | 2 |
| Primary Colors | 1998 | 71st | 0 | 2 |
| The Mask of Zorro | 1998 | 71st | 0 | 2 |
| A Bug's Life | 1998 | 71st | 0 | 1 |
| A Place in the Land | 1998 | 71st | 0 | 1 |
| American History X | 1998 | 71st | 0 | 1 |
| Babe: Pig in the City | 1998 | 71st | 0 | 1 |
| Beloved | 1998 | 71st | 0 | 1 |
| Bulworth | 1998 | 71st | 0 | 1 |
| Children of Heaven | 1997 | 71st | 0 | 1 |
| Culture | 1997 | 71st | 0 | 1 |
| Dancemaker | 1998 | 71st | 0 | 1 |
| Holiday Romance | 1998 | 71st | 0 | 1 |
| Jolly Roger | 1999 | 71st | 0 | 1 |
| La Carte Postale | 1998 | 71st | 0 | 1 |
| Lenny Bruce: Swear to Tell the Truth | 1998 | 71st | 0 | 1 |
| Little Voice | 1998 | 71st | 0 | 1 |
| Mighty Joe Young | 1998 | 71st | 0 | 1 |
| More | 1998 | 71st | 0 | 1 |
| Mulan | 1998 | 71st | 0 | 1 |
| One True Thing | 1998 | 71st | 0 | 1 |
| Patch Adams | 1998 | 71st | 0 | 1 |
| Quest for Camelot | 1998 | 71st | 0 | 1 |
| Regret to Inform | 1998 | 71st | 0 | 1 |
| Sunrise Over Tiananmen Square | 1998 | 71st | 0 | 1 |
| Tango | 1998 | 71st | 0 | 1 |
| The Canterbury Tales | 1998 | 71st | 0 | 1 |
| The Farm: Angola, USA | 1998 | 71st | 0 | 1 |
| The Grandfather | 1998 | 71st | 0 | 1 |
| The Horse Whisperer | 1998 | 71st | 0 | 1 |
| Velvet Goldmine | 1998 | 71st | 0 | 1 |
| Victor | 1998 | 71st | 0 | 1 |
| When Life Departs | 1997 | 71st | 0 | 1 |
| **American Beauty** | 1999 | 72nd | 5 | 8 |
| The Matrix | 1999 | 72nd | 4 | 4 |
| The Cider House Rules | 1999 | 72nd | 2 | 7 |
| Topsy-Turvy | 1999 | 72nd | 2 | 4 |
| Sleepy Hollow | 1999 | 72nd | 1 | 3 |
| Boys Don't Cry | 1999 | 72nd | 1 | 2 |
| All About My Mother | 1999 | 72nd | 1 | 1 |
| Girl, Interrupted | 1999 | 72nd | 1 | 1 |
| King Gimp | 1999 | 72nd | 1 | 1 |
| My Mother Dreams the Satan's Disciples in New York | 1999 | 72nd | 1 | 1 |
| One Day in September | 1999 | 72nd | 1 | 1 |
| Tarzan | 1999 | 72nd | 1 | 1 |
| The Old Man and the Sea | 1999 | 72nd | 1 | 1 |
| The Red Violin | 1998 | 72nd | 1 | 1 |
| The Insider | 1999 | 72nd | 0 | 7 |
| The Sixth Sense | 1999 | 72nd | 0 | 6 |
| The Talented Mr. Ripley | 1999 | 72nd | 0 | 5 |
| The Green Mile | 1999 | 72nd | 0 | 4 |
| Being John Malkovich | 1999 | 72nd | 0 | 3 |
| Magnolia | 1999 | 72nd | 0 | 3 |
| Star Wars: Episode I – The Phantom Menace | 1999 | 72nd | 0 | 3 |
| Anna and the King | 1999 | 72nd | 0 | 2 |
| Music of the Heart | 1999 | 72nd | 0 | 2 |
| Sweet and Lowdown | 1999 | 72nd | 0 | 2 |
| The End of the Affair | 1999 | 72nd | 0 | 2 |
| 3 Misses | 1998 | 72nd | 0 | 1 |
| Angela's Ashes | 1999 | 72nd | 0 | 1 |
| Austin Powers: The Spy Who Shagged Me | 1999 | 72nd | 0 | 1 |
| Bicentennial Man | 1999 | 72nd | 0 | 1 |
| Bror, Min Bror | 1999 | 72nd | 0 | 1 |
| Buena Vista Social Club | 1999 | 72nd | 0 | 1 |
| East/West | 1999 | 72nd | 0 | 1 |
| Election | 1999 | 72nd | 0 | 1 |
| Eyewitness | 1999 | 72nd | 0 | 1 |
| Fight Club | 1999 | 72nd | 0 | 1 |
| Genghis Blues | 1999 | 72nd | 0 | 1 |
| Himalaya | 1999 | 72nd | 0 | 1 |
| Humdrum | 1999 | 72nd | 0 | 1 |
| Killing Joe | 1999 | 72nd | 0 | 1 |
| Kleingeld | 1999 | 72nd | 0 | 1 |
| Life | 1999 | 72nd | 0 | 1 |
| Major and Minor Miracles | 1999 | 72nd | 0 | 1 |
| My Grandmother Ironed the King's Shirts | 1999 | 72nd | 0 | 1 |
| On the Ropes | 1999 | 72nd | 0 | 1 |
| Snow Falling on Cedars | 1999 | 72nd | 0 | 1 |
| Solomon & Gaenor | 1999 | 72nd | 0 | 1 |
| South Park: Bigger, Longer & Uncut | 1999 | 72nd | 0 | 1 |
| Speaking in Strings | 1999 | 72nd | 0 | 1 |
| Stuart Little | 1999 | 72nd | 0 | 1 |
| The Hurricane | 1999 | 72nd | 0 | 1 |
| The Mummy | 1999 | 72nd | 0 | 1 |
| The Straight Story | 1999 | 72nd | 0 | 1 |
| The Wildest Show in the South: The Angola Prison Rodeo | 1999 | 72nd | 0 | 1 |
| Titus | 1999 | 72nd | 0 | 1 |
| Toy Story 2 | 1999 | 72nd | 0 | 1 |
| Tumbleweeds | 1999 | 72nd | 0 | 1 |
| Under the Sun | 1998 | 72nd | 0 | 1 |
| When the Day Breaks | 1999 | 72nd | 0 | 1 |
| **Gladiator** | 2000 | 73rd | 5 | 12 |
| Crouching Tiger, Hidden Dragon | 2000 | 73rd | 4 | 10 |
| Traffic | 2000 | 73rd | 4 | 5 |
| Erin Brockovich | 2000 | 73rd | 1 | 5 |
| Almost Famous | 2000 | 73rd | 1 | 4 |
| How the Grinch Stole Christmas | 2000 | 73rd | 1 | 3 |
| Wonder Boys | 2000 | 73rd | 1 | 3 |
| Pollock | 2000 | 73rd | 1 | 2 |
| U-571 | 2000 | 73rd | 1 | 2 |
| Big Mama | 2000 | 73rd | 1 | 1 |
| Father and Daughter | 2000 | 73rd | 1 | 1 |
| Into the Arms of Strangers: Stories of the Kindertransport | 2000 | 73rd | 1 | 1 |
| Quiero ser (I want to be...) | 2000 | 73rd | 1 | 1 |
| Chocolat | 2000 | 73rd | 0 | 5 |
| Billy Elliot | 2000 | 73rd | 0 | 3 |
| Quills | 2000 | 73rd | 0 | 3 |
| The Patriot | 2000 | 73rd | 0 | 3 |
| Cast Away | 2000 | 73rd | 0 | 2 |
| Malèna | 2000 | 73rd | 0 | 2 |
| O Brother, Where Art Thou? | 2000 | 73rd | 0 | 2 |
| Shadow of the Vampire | 2000 | 73rd | 0 | 2 |
| The Contender | 2000 | 73rd | 0 | 2 |
| The Perfect Storm | 2000 | 73rd | 0 | 2 |
| You Can Count on Me | 2000 | 73rd | 0 | 2 |
| 102 Dalmatians | 2000 | 73rd | 0 | 1 |
| A Soccer Story | 1998 | 73rd | 0 | 1 |
| Amores perros | 2000 | 73rd | 0 | 1 |
| Before Night Falls | 2000 | 73rd | 0 | 1 |
| By Courier | 2001 | 73rd | 0 | 1 |
| Curtain Call | 2000 | 73rd | 0 | 1 |
| Dancer in the Dark | 2000 | 73rd | 0 | 1 |
| Divided We Fall | 2000 | 73rd | 0 | 1 |
| Dolphins | 2000 | 73rd | 0 | 1 |
| Everybody's Famous! | 2000 | 73rd | 0 | 1 |
| Hollow Man | 2000 | 73rd | 0 | 1 |
| Legacy | 2000 | 73rd | 0 | 1 |
| Long Night's Journey into Day | 2000 | 73rd | 0 | 1 |
| Meet the Parents | 2000 | 73rd | 0 | 1 |
| On Tiptoe: Gentle Steps to Freedom | 2000 | 73rd | 0 | 1 |
| One Day Crossing | 2001 | 73rd | 0 | 1 |
| Periwig Maker | 1999 | 73rd | 0 | 1 |
| Rejected | 2000 | 73rd | 0 | 1 |
| Requiem for a Dream | 2000 | 73rd | 0 | 1 |
| Scottsboro: An American Tragedy | 2001 | 73rd | 0 | 1 |
| Seraglio | 2000 | 73rd | 0 | 1 |
| Sound and Fury | 2000 | 73rd | 0 | 1 |
| Space Cowboys | 2000 | 73rd | 0 | 1 |
| The Cell | 2000 | 73rd | 0 | 1 |
| The Emperor's New Groove | 2000 | 73rd | 0 | 1 |
| The Man on Lincoln's Nose | 2000 | 73rd | 0 | 1 |
| The Taste of Others | 2000 | 73rd | 0 | 1 |
| Vatel | 2000 | 73rd | 0 | 1 |
| **A Beautiful Mind** | 2001 | 74th | 4 | 8 |
| The Lord of the Rings: The Fellowship of the Ring | 2001 | 74th | 4 | 13 |
| Moulin Rouge! | 2001 | 74th | 2 | 8 |
| Black Hawk Down | 2001 | 74th | 2 | 4 |
| Gosford Park | 2001 | 74th | 1 | 7 |
| Monsters, Inc. | 2001 | 74th | 1 | 4 |
| Pearl Harbor | 2001 | 74th | 1 | 4 |
| Iris | 2001 | 74th | 1 | 3 |
| Monster's Ball | 2001 | 74th | 1 | 2 |
| Shrek | 2001 | 74th | 1 | 2 |
| Training Day | 2001 | 74th | 1 | 2 |
| For the Birds | 2000 | 74th | 1 | 1 |
| Murder on a Sunday Morning | 2001 | 74th | 1 | 1 |
| No Man's Land | 2001 | 74th | 1 | 1 |
| The Accountant | 2001 | 74th | 1 | 1 |
| Thoth | 2001 | 74th | 1 | 1 |
| Amélie | 2001 | 74th | 0 | 5 |
| In the Bedroom | 2001 | 74th | 0 | 5 |
| Harry Potter and the Philosopher's Stone | 2001 | 74th | 0 | 3 |
| A.I. Artificial Intelligence | 2001 | 74th | 0 | 2 |
| Ali | 2001 | 74th | 0 | 2 |
| Memento | 2000 | 74th | 0 | 2 |
| A Man Thing (Męska Sprawa) | 2001 | 74th | 0 | 1 |
| Artists and Orphans: A True Drama | 2001 | 74th | 0 | 1 |
| Bridget Jones's Diary | 2001 | 74th | 0 | 1 |
| Children Underground | 2001 | 74th | 0 | 1 |
| Copy Shop | 2001 | 74th | 0 | 1 |
| Elling | 2001 | 74th | 0 | 1 |
| Fifty Percent Grey | 2001 | 74th | 0 | 1 |
| Ghost World | 2001 | 74th | 0 | 1 |
| Give Up Yer Aul Sins | 2001 | 74th | 0 | 1 |
| Gregor's Greatest Invention | 2001 | 74th | 0 | 1 |
| I Am Sam | 2001 | 74th | 0 | 1 |
| Jimmy Neutron: Boy Genius | 2001 | 74th | 0 | 1 |
| Kate & Leopold | 2001 | 74th | 0 | 1 |
| Lagaan | 2001 | 74th | 0 | 1 |
| LaLee's Kin: The Legacy of Cotton | 2001 | 74th | 0 | 1 |
| Mulholland Drive | 2001 | 74th | 0 | 1 |
| Promises | 2001 | 74th | 0 | 1 |
| Sexy Beast | 2000 | 74th | 0 | 1 |
| Sing! | 2001 | 74th | 0 | 1 |
| Son of the Bride | 2001 | 74th | 0 | 1 |
| Speed for Thespians | 2000 | 74th | 0 | 1 |
| Strange Invaders | 2002 | 74th | 0 | 1 |
| Stubble Trouble | 2000 | 74th | 0 | 1 |
| The Affair of the Necklace | 2001 | 74th | 0 | 1 |
| The Man Who Wasn't There | 2001 | 74th | 0 | 1 |
| The Royal Tenenbaums | 2001 | 74th | 0 | 1 |
| Vanilla Sky | 2001 | 74th | 0 | 1 |
| War Photographer | 2001 | 74th | 0 | 1 |
| **Chicago** | 2002 | 75th | 6 | 13 |
| The Pianist | 2002 | 75th | 3 | 7 |
| Frida | 2002 | 75th | 2 | 6 |
| The Lord of the Rings: The Two Towers | 2002 | 75th | 2 | 6 |
| The Hours | 2002 | 75th | 1 | 9 |
| Road to Perdition | 2002 | 75th | 1 | 6 |
| Adaptation | 2002 | 75th | 1 | 4 |
| Talk to Her | 2002 | 75th | 1 | 2 |
| 8 Mile | 2002 | 75th | 1 | 1 |
| Bowling for Columbine | 2002 | 75th | 1 | 1 |
| Nowhere in Africa | 2001 | 75th | 1 | 1 |
| Spirited Away | 2001 | 75th | 1 | 1 |
| The ChubbChubbs! | 2002 | 75th | 1 | 1 |
| This Charming Man | 2002 | 75th | 1 | 1 |
| Twin Towers | 2002 | 75th | 1 | 1 |
| Gangs of New York | 2002 | 75th | 0 | 10 |
| Far from Heaven | 2002 | 75th | 0 | 4 |
| About Schmidt | 2002 | 75th | 0 | 2 |
| Catch Me If You Can | 2002 | 75th | 0 | 2 |
| Spider-Man | 2002 | 75th | 0 | 2 |
| About a Boy | 2002 | 75th | 0 | 1 |
| Das Rad | 2001 | 75th | 0 | 1 |
| Daughter from Danang | 2002 | 75th | 0 | 1 |
| Fait D'Hiver | 2002 | 75th | 0 | 1 |
| Hero | 2002 | 75th | 0 | 1 |
| I'll Wait for the Next One (J'Attendrai Le Suivant) | 2002 | 75th | 0 | 1 |
| Ice Age | 2002 | 75th | 0 | 1 |
| Inja (Dog) | 2002 | 75th | 0 | 1 |
| Johnny Flynton | 2002 | 75th | 0 | 1 |
| The Cathedral | 2002 | 75th | 0 | 1 |
| Lilo & Stitch | 2002 | 75th | 0 | 1 |
| Mighty Times: The Legacy of Rosa Parks | 2002 | 75th | 0 | 1 |
| Mike's New Car | 2002 | 75th | 0 | 1 |
| Minority Report | 2002 | 75th | 0 | 1 |
| Mt. Head | 2002 | 75th | 0 | 1 |
| My Big Fat Greek Wedding | 2002 | 75th | 0 | 1 |
| Prisoner of Paradise | 2002 | 75th | 0 | 1 |
| Spellbound | 2002 | 75th | 0 | 1 |
| Spirit: Stallion of the Cimarron | 2002 | 75th | 0 | 1 |
| Star Wars: Episode II – Attack of the Clones | 2002 | 75th | 0 | 1 |
| The Collector of Bedford Street | 2002 | 75th | 0 | 1 |
| The Crime of Father Amaro | 2002 | 75th | 0 | 1 |
| The Man Without a Past | 2002 | 75th | 0 | 1 |
| The Quiet American | 2002 | 75th | 0 | 1 |
| The Time Machine | 2002 | 75th | 0 | 1 |
| The Wild Thornberrys | 2002 | 75th | 0 | 1 |
| Treasure Planet | 2002 | 75th | 0 | 1 |
| Unfaithful | 2002 | 75th | 0 | 1 |
| Why Can't We Be a Family Again? | 2002 | 75th | 0 | 1 |
| Winged Migration | 2001 | 75th | 0 | 1 |
| Y tu mamá también | 2001 | 75th | 0 | 1 |
| Zus & Zo | 2001 | 75th | 0 | 1 |
| **The Lord of the Rings: The Return of the King** | 2003 | 76th | 11 | 11 |
| Master and Commander: The Far Side of the World | 2003 | 76th | 2 | 10 |
| Mystic River | 2003 | 76th | 2 | 6 |
| Cold Mountain | 2003 | 76th | 1 | 7 |
| Finding Nemo | 2003 | 76th | 1 | 4 |
| Lost in Translation | 2003 | 76th | 1 | 4 |
| The Barbarian Invasions | 2003 | 76th | 1 | 2 |
| Chernobyl Heart | 2003 | 76th | 1 | 1 |
| Harvie Krumpet | 2003 | 76th | 1 | 1 |
| Monster | 2003 | 76th | 1 | 1 |
| The Fog of War | 2003 | 76th | 1 | 1 |
| Two Soldiers | 2003 | 76th | 1 | 1 |
| Seabiscuit | 2003 | 76th | 0 | 7 |
| Pirates of the Caribbean: The Curse of the Black Pearl | 2003 | 76th | 0 | 5 |
| City of God | 2002 | 76th | 0 | 4 |
| The Last Samurai | 2003 | 76th | 0 | 4 |
| Girl with a Pearl Earring | 2003 | 76th | 0 | 3 |
| House of Sand and Fog | 2003 | 76th | 0 | 3 |
| In America | 2002 | 76th | 0 | 3 |
| 21 Grams | 2003 | 76th | 0 | 2 |
| The Triplets of Belleville | 2003 | 76th | 0 | 2 |
| (A) Torzija [(A) Torsion] | 2003 | 76th | 0 | 1 |
| A Mighty Wind | 2003 | 76th | 0 | 1 |
| American Splendor | 2003 | 76th | 0 | 1 |
| Asylum | 2003 | 76th | 0 | 1 |
| Balseros | 2002 | 76th | 0 | 1 |
| Big Fish | 2003 | 76th | 0 | 1 |
| Boundin' | 2003 | 76th | 0 | 1 |
| Brother Bear | 2003 | 76th | 0 | 1 |
| Capturing the Friedmans | 2003 | 76th | 0 | 1 |
| Destino | 2003 | 76th | 0 | 1 |
| Die Rote Jacke (The Red Jacket) | 2002 | 76th | 0 | 1 |
| Dirty Pretty Things | 2002 | 76th | 0 | 1 |
| Evil | 2003 | 76th | 0 | 1 |
| Ferry Tales | 2003 | 76th | 0 | 1 |
| Gone Nutty | 2002 | 76th | 0 | 1 |
| Most (The Bridge) | 2003 | 76th | 0 | 1 |
| My Architect | 2003 | 76th | 0 | 1 |
| Nibbles | 2003 | 76th | 0 | 1 |
| Pieces of April | 2003 | 76th | 0 | 1 |
| Something's Gotta Give | 2003 | 76th | 0 | 1 |
| Squash | 2002 | 76th | 0 | 1 |
| The Cooler | 2003 | 76th | 0 | 1 |
| The Twilight Samurai | 2002 | 76th | 0 | 1 |
| The Weather Underground | 2002 | 76th | 0 | 1 |
| Thirteen | 2003 | 76th | 0 | 1 |
| Twin Sisters | 2002 | 76th | 0 | 1 |
| Whale Rider | 2002 | 76th | 0 | 1 |
| Želary | 2003 | 76th | 0 | 1 |
| **Million Dollar Baby** | 2004 | 77th | 4 | 7 |
| The Aviator | 2004 | 77th | 5 | 11 |
| Ray | 2004 | 77th | 2 | 6 |
| The Incredibles | 2004 | 77th | 2 | 4 |
| Finding Neverland | 2004 | 77th | 1 | 7 |
| Sideways | 2004 | 77th | 1 | 5 |
| Lemony Snicket's A Series of Unfortunate Events | 2004 | 77th | 1 | 4 |
| Spider-Man 2 | 2004 | 77th | 1 | 3 |
| Eternal Sunshine of the Spotless Mind | 2004 | 77th | 1 | 2 |
| The Motorcycle Diaries | 2004 | 77th | 1 | 2 |
| The Sea Inside | 2004 | 77th | 1 | 2 |
| Born into Brothels: Calcutta's Red Light Kids | 2004 | 77th | 1 | 1 |
| Mighty Times: The Children's March | 2004 | 77th | 1 | 1 |
| Ryan | 2004 | 77th | 1 | 1 |
| Wasp | 2003 | 77th | 1 | 1 |
| Hotel Rwanda | 2004 | 77th | 0 | 3 |
| The Passion of the Christ | 2004 | 77th | 0 | 3 |
| The Phantom of the Opera | 2004 | 77th | 0 | 3 |
| The Polar Express | 2004 | 77th | 0 | 3 |
| Vera Drake | 2004 | 77th | 0 | 3 |
| A Very Long Engagement | 2004 | 77th | 0 | 2 |
| Closer | 2004 | 77th | 0 | 2 |
| Collateral | 2004 | 77th | 0 | 2 |
| Harry Potter and the Prisoner of Azkaban | 2004 | 77th | 0 | 2 |
| Shrek 2 | 2004 | 77th | 0 | 2 |
| The Chorus | 2004 | 77th | 0 | 2 |
| 7:35 in the Morning | 2003 | 77th | 0 | 1 |
| As It Is in Heaven | 2004 | 77th | 0 | 1 |
| Autism Is a World | 2004 | 77th | 0 | 1 |
| Before Sunset | 2004 | 77th | 0 | 1 |
| Being Julia | 2004 | 77th | 0 | 1 |
| Birthday Boy | 2004 | 77th | 0 | 1 |
| Downfall | 2004 | 77th | 0 | 1 |
| Everything in This Country Must | 2004 | 77th | 0 | 1 |
| Gopher Broke | 2004 | 77th | 0 | 1 |
| Guard Dog | 2004 | 77th | 0 | 1 |
| Hardwood | 2005 | 77th | 0 | 1 |
| House of Flying Daggers | 2004 | 77th | 0 | 1 |
| I, Robot | 2004 | 77th | 0 | 1 |
| Kinsey | 2004 | 77th | 0 | 1 |
| Little Terrorist | 2004 | 77th | 0 | 1 |
| Lorenzo | 2004 | 77th | 0 | 1 |
| Maria Full of Grace | 2004 | 77th | 0 | 1 |
| Shark Tale | 2004 | 77th | 0 | 1 |
| Sister Rose's Passion | 2004 | 77th | 0 | 1 |
| Super Size Me | 2004 | 77th | 0 | 1 |
| The Children of Leningradsky | 2005 | 77th | 0 | 1 |
| The Story of the Weeping Camel | 2003 | 77th | 0 | 1 |
| The Village | 2004 | 77th | 0 | 1 |
| Troy | 2004 | 77th | 0 | 1 |
| Tupac: Resurrection | 2003 | 77th | 0 | 1 |
| Twist of Faith | 2004 | 77th | 0 | 1 |
| Two Cars, One Night | 2004 | 77th | 0 | 1 |
| Yesterday | 2004 | 77th | 0 | 1 |
| **Crash** | 2004 | 78th | 3 | 6 |
| Brokeback Mountain | 2005 | 78th | 3 | 8 |
| Memoirs of a Geisha | 2005 | 78th | 3 | 6 |
| King Kong | 2005 | 78th | 3 | 4 |
| Capote | 2005 | 78th | 1 | 5 |
| Walk the Line | 2005 | 78th | 1 | 5 |
| The Constant Gardener | 2005 | 78th | 1 | 4 |
| The Chronicles of Narnia: The Lion, the Witch and the Wardrobe | 2005 | 78th | 1 | 3 |
| Hustle & Flow | 2005 | 78th | 1 | 2 |
| Syriana | 2005 | 78th | 1 | 2 |
| A Note of Triumph: The Golden Age of Norman Corwin | 2005 | 78th | 1 | 1 |
| March of the Penguins | 2005 | 78th | 1 | 1 |
| Six Shooter | 2004 | 78th | 1 | 1 |
| The Moon and the Son: An Imagined Conversation | 2005 | 78th | 1 | 1 |
| Tsotsi | 2005 | 78th | 1 | 1 |
| Wallace & Gromit: The Curse of the Were-Rabbit | 2005 | 78th | 1 | 1 |
| Good Night, and Good Luck | 2005 | 78th | 0 | 6 |
| Munich | 2005 | 78th | 0 | 5 |
| Pride & Prejudice | 2005 | 78th | 0 | 4 |
| Cinderella Man | 2005 | 78th | 0 | 3 |
| War of the Worlds | 2005 | 78th | 0 | 3 |
| A History of Violence | 2005 | 78th | 0 | 2 |
| Mrs Henderson Presents | 2005 | 78th | 0 | 2 |
| North Country | 2005 | 78th | 0 | 2 |
| Transamerica | 2005 | 78th | 0 | 2 |
| 9 | 2005 | 78th | 0 | 1 |
| Badgered | 2005 | 78th | 0 | 1 |
| Batman Begins | 2005 | 78th | 0 | 1 |
| Cashback | 2004 | 78th | 0 | 1 |
| Charlie and the Chocolate Factory | 2005 | 78th | 0 | 1 |
| Corpse Bride | 2005 | 78th | 0 | 1 |
| Darwin's Nightmare | 2004 | 78th | 0 | 1 |
| Don't Tell | 2005 | 78th | 0 | 1 |
| Enron: The Smartest Guys in the Room | 2005 | 78th | 0 | 1 |
| God Sleeps in Rwanda | 2005 | 78th | 0 | 1 |
| Harry Potter and the Goblet of Fire | 2005 | 78th | 0 | 1 |
| Howl's Moving Castle | 2004 | 78th | 0 | 1 |
| Joyeux Noël | 2005 | 78th | 0 | 1 |
| Junebug | 2005 | 78th | 0 | 1 |
| Match Point | 2005 | 78th | 0 | 1 |
| Murderball | 2005 | 78th | 0 | 1 |
| One Man Band | 2005 | 78th | 0 | 1 |
| Our Time Is Up | 2004 | 78th | 0 | 1 |
| Paradise Now | 2005 | 78th | 0 | 1 |
| Sophie Scholl – The Final Days | 2005 | 78th | 0 | 1 |
| Star Wars: Episode III – Revenge of the Sith | 2005 | 78th | 0 | 1 |
| Street Fight | 2005 | 78th | 0 | 1 |
| The Death of Kevin Carter: Casualty of the Bang Bang Club | 2004 | 78th | 0 | 1 |
| The Last Farm | 2004 | 78th | 0 | 1 |
| The Mushroom Club | 2005 | 78th | 0 | 1 |
| The Mysterious Geographic Explorations of Jasper Morello | 2005 | 78th | 0 | 1 |
| The New World | 2005 | 78th | 0 | 1 |
| The Runaway | 2004 | 78th | 0 | 1 |
| The Squid and the Whale | 2005 | 78th | 0 | 1 |
| **The Departed** | 2006 | 79th | 4 | 5 |
| Pan's Labyrinth | 2006 | 79th | 3 | 6 |
| Dreamgirls | 2006 | 79th | 2 | 8 |
| Little Miss Sunshine | 2006 | 79th | 2 | 4 |
| An Inconvenient Truth | 2006 | 79th | 2 | 2 |
| Babel | 2006 | 79th | 1 | 7 |
| The Queen | 2006 | 79th | 1 | 6 |
| Letters from Iwo Jima | 2006 | 79th | 1 | 4 |
| Pirates of the Caribbean: Dead Man's Chest | 2006 | 79th | 1 | 4 |
| Happy Feet | 2006 | 79th | 1 | 1 |
| Marie Antoinette | 2006 | 79th | 1 | 1 |
| The Blood of Yingzhou District | 2006 | 79th | 1 | 1 |
| The Danish Poet | 2006 | 79th | 1 | 1 |
| The Last King of Scotland | 2006 | 79th | 1 | 1 |
| The Lives of Others | 2006 | 79th | 1 | 1 |
| West Bank Story | 2005 | 79th | 1 | 1 |
| Blood Diamond | 2006 | 79th | 0 | 5 |
| Notes on a Scandal | 2006 | 79th | 0 | 4 |
| Apocalypto | 2006 | 79th | 0 | 3 |
| Children of Men | 2006 | 79th | 0 | 3 |
| Little Children | 2006 | 79th | 0 | 3 |
| Cars | 2006 | 79th | 0 | 2 |
| Flags of Our Fathers | 2006 | 79th | 0 | 2 |
| The Devil Wears Prada | 2006 | 79th | 0 | 2 |
| The Prestige | 2006 | 79th | 0 | 2 |
| United 93 | 2006 | 79th | 0 | 2 |
| After the Wedding | 2006 | 79th | 0 | 1 |
| Binta and the Great Idea | 2004 | 79th | 0 | 1 |
| Borat: Cultural Learnings of America for Make Benefit Glorious Nation of Kazakhstan | 2006 | 79th | 0 | 1 |
| Click | 2006 | 79th | 0 | 1 |
| Curse of the Golden Flower | 2006 | 79th | 0 | 1 |
| Days of Glory | 2006 | 79th | 0 | 1 |
| Deliver Us from Evil | 2006 | 79th | 0 | 1 |
| Éramos pocos (One Too Many) | 2005 | 79th | 0 | 1 |
| Half Nelson | 2006 | 79th | 0 | 1 |
| Helmer & Son | 2006 | 79th | 0 | 1 |
| Iraq in Fragments | 2006 | 79th | 0 | 1 |
| Jesus Camp | 2006 | 79th | 0 | 1 |
| Lifted | 2006 | 79th | 0 | 1 |
| Maestro | 2005 | 79th | 0 | 1 |
| Monster House | 2006 | 79th | 0 | 1 |
| My Country, My Country | 2006 | 79th | 0 | 1 |
| No Time for Nuts | 2006 | 79th | 0 | 1 |
| Poseidon | 2006 | 79th | 0 | 1 |
| Recycled Life | 2006 | 79th | 0 | 1 |
| Rehearsing a Dream | 2006 | 79th | 0 | 1 |
| Superman Returns | 2006 | 79th | 0 | 1 |
| The Black Dahlia | 2006 | 79th | 0 | 1 |
| The Good German | 2006 | 79th | 0 | 1 |
| The Good Shepherd | 2006 | 79th | 0 | 1 |
| The Illusionist | 2006 | 79th | 0 | 1 |
| The Little Matchgirl | 2006 | 79th | 0 | 1 |
| The Pursuit of Happyness | 2006 | 79th | 0 | 1 |
| The Saviour | 2005 | 79th | 0 | 1 |
| Two Hands: The Leon Fleisher Story | 2006 | 79th | 0 | 1 |
| Venus | 2006 | 79th | 0 | 1 |
| Volver | 2006 | 79th | 0 | 1 |
| Water | 2005 | 79th | 0 | 1 |
| **No Country for Old Men** | 2007 | 80th | 4 | 8 |
| The Bourne Ultimatum | 2007 | 80th | 3 | 3 |
| There Will Be Blood | 2007 | 80th | 2 | 8 |
| La Vie en Rose | 2007 | 80th | 2 | 3 |
| Atonement | 2007 | 80th | 1 | 7 |
| Michael Clayton | 2007 | 80th | 1 | 7 |
| Ratatouille | 2007 | 80th | 1 | 5 |
| Juno | 2007 | 80th | 1 | 4 |
| Sweeney Todd: The Demon Barber of Fleet Street | 2007 | 80th | 1 | 3 |
| Elizabeth: The Golden Age | 2007 | 80th | 1 | 2 |
| The Golden Compass | 2007 | 80th | 1 | 2 |
| Freeheld | 2007 | 80th | 1 | 1 |
| Once | 2007 | 80th | 1 | 1 |
| Peter & the Wolf | 2006 | 80th | 1 | 1 |
| Taxi to the Dark Side | 2007 | 80th | 1 | 1 |
| The Counterfeiters | 2007 | 80th | 1 | 1 |
| The Mozart of Pickpockets | 2006 | 80th | 1 | 1 |
| The Diving Bell and the Butterfly | 2007 | 80th | 0 | 4 |
| Enchanted | 2007 | 80th | 0 | 3 |
| Transformers | 2007 | 80th | 0 | 3 |
| 3:10 to Yuma | 2007 | 80th | 0 | 2 |
| American Gangster | 2007 | 80th | 0 | 2 |
| Away from Her | 2006 | 80th | 0 | 2 |
| Into the Wild | 2007 | 80th | 0 | 2 |
| Pirates of the Caribbean: At World's End | 2007 | 80th | 0 | 2 |
| The Assassination of Jesse James by the Coward Robert Ford | 2007 | 80th | 0 | 2 |
| The Savages | 2007 | 80th | 0 | 2 |
| 12 | 2007 | 80th | 0 | 1 |
| Across the Universe | 2007 | 80th | 0 | 1 |
| At Night | 2007 | 80th | 0 | 1 |
| August Rush | 2007 | 80th | 0 | 1 |
| Beaufort | 2007 | 80th | 0 | 1 |
| Charlie Wilson's War | 2007 | 80th | 0 | 1 |
| Eastern Promises | 2007 | 80th | 0 | 1 |
| Even Pigeons Go to Heaven | 2007 | 80th | 0 | 1 |
| Gone Baby Gone | 2007 | 80th | 0 | 1 |
| I Met the Walrus | 2007 | 80th | 0 | 1 |
| I'm Not There | 2007 | 80th | 0 | 1 |
| In the Valley of Elah | 2007 | 80th | 0 | 1 |
| Katyń | 2007 | 80th | 0 | 1 |
| La Corona | 2008 | 80th | 0 | 1 |
| Lars and the Real Girl | 2007 | 80th | 0 | 1 |
| Madame Tutli-Putli | 2007 | 80th | 0 | 1 |
| Mongol | 2007 | 80th | 0 | 1 |
| My Love | 2006 | 80th | 0 | 1 |
| No End in Sight | 2007 | 80th | 0 | 1 |
| Norbit | 2007 | 80th | 0 | 1 |
| Operation Homecoming: Writing the Wartime Experience | 2007 | 80th | 0 | 1 |
| Persepolis | 2007 | 80th | 0 | 1 |
| Salim Baba | 2007 | 80th | 0 | 1 |
| Sari's Mother | 2006 | 80th | 0 | 1 |
| Sicko | 2007 | 80th | 0 | 1 |
| Surf's Up | 2007 | 80th | 0 | 1 |
| Tanghi Argentini | 2006 | 80th | 0 | 1 |
| The Kite Runner | 2007 | 80th | 0 | 1 |
| The Substitute | 2007 | 80th | 0 | 1 |
| The Tonto Woman | 2008 | 80th | 0 | 1 |
| War/Dance | 2007 | 80th | 0 | 1 |
| **Slumdog Millionaire** | 2008 | 81st | 8 | 10 |
| The Curious Case of Benjamin Button | 2008 | 81st | 3 | 13 |
| Milk | 2008 | 81st | 2 | 8 |
| The Dark Knight | 2008 | 81st | 2 | 8 |
| WALL-E | 2008 | 81st | 1 | 6 |
| The Reader | 2008 | 81st | 1 | 5 |
| The Duchess | 2008 | 81st | 1 | 2 |
| Departures | 2008 | 81st | 1 | 1 |
| La Maison en Petits Cubes | 2008 | 81st | 1 | 1 |
| Man on Wire | 2008 | 81st | 1 | 1 |
| Smile Pinki | 2008 | 81st | 1 | 1 |
| Toyland | 2007 | 81st | 1 | 1 |
| Vicky Cristina Barcelona | 2008 | 81st | 1 | 1 |
| Doubt | 2008 | 81st | 0 | 5 |
| Frost/Nixon | 2008 | 81st | 0 | 5 |
| Changeling | 2008 | 81st | 0 | 3 |
| Revolutionary Road | 2008 | 81st | 0 | 3 |
| Frozen River | 2008 | 81st | 0 | 2 |
| Iron Man | 2008 | 81st | 0 | 2 |
| The Wrestler | 2008 | 81st | 0 | 2 |
| Wanted | 2008 | 81st | 0 | 2 |
| Australia | 2008 | 81st | 0 | 1 |
| Bolt | 2008 | 81st | 0 | 1 |
| Defiance | 2008 | 81st | 0 | 1 |
| Encounters at the End of the World | 2007 | 81st | 0 | 1 |
| Happy-Go-Lucky | 2008 | 81st | 0 | 1 |
| Hellboy II: The Golden Army | 2008 | 81st | 0 | 1 |
| In Bruges | 2008 | 81st | 0 | 1 |
| Kung Fu Panda | 2008 | 81st | 0 | 1 |
| Lavatory – Lovestory | 2007 | 81st | 0 | 1 |
| Manon on the Asphalt | 2007 | 81st | 0 | 1 |
| New Boy | 2007 | 81st | 0 | 1 |
| Oktapodi | 2007 | 81st | 0 | 1 |
| On the Line (Auf der Strecke) | 2007 | 81st | 0 | 1 |
| Presto | 2008 | 81st | 0 | 1 |
| Rachel Getting Married | 2008 | 81st | 0 | 1 |
| Revanche | 2008 | 81st | 0 | 1 |
| The Baader Meinhof Complex | 2008 | 81st | 0 | 1 |
| The Betrayal – Nerakhoon | 2008 | 81st | 0 | 1 |
| The Class | 2008 | 81st | 0 | 1 |
| The Conscience of Nhem En | 2008 | 81st | 0 | 1 |
| The Final Inch | 2009 | 81st | 0 | 1 |
| The Garden | 2008 | 81st | 0 | 1 |
| The Pig (Grisen) | 2008 | 81st | 0 | 1 |
| The Visitor | 2007 | 81st | 0 | 1 |
| The Witness: From the Balcony of Room 306 | 2008 | 81st | 0 | 1 |
| This Way Up | 2008 | 81st | 0 | 1 |
| Tropic Thunder | 2008 | 81st | 0 | 1 |
| Trouble the Water | 2008 | 81st | 0 | 1 |
| Waltz with Bashir | 2008 | 81st | 0 | 1 |
| **The Hurt Locker** | 2008 | 82nd | 6 | 9 |
| Avatar | 2009 | 82nd | 3 | 9 |
| Precious | 2009 | 82nd | 2 | 6 |
| Up | 2009 | 82nd | 2 | 5 |
| Crazy Heart | 2009 | 82nd | 2 | 3 |
| Inglourious Basterds | 2009 | 82nd | 1 | 8 |
| Star Trek | 2009 | 82nd | 1 | 4 |
| The Young Victoria | 2009 | 82nd | 1 | 3 |
| The Blind Side | 2009 | 82nd | 1 | 2 |
| Logorama | 2009 | 82nd | 1 | 1 |
| Music by Prudence | 2010 | 82nd | 1 | 1 |
| The Cove | 2009 | 82nd | 1 | 1 |
| The New Tenants | 2009 | 82nd | 1 | 1 |
| The Secret in Their Eyes | 2009 | 82nd | 1 | 1 |
| Up in the Air | 2009 | 82nd | 0 | 6 |
| District 9 | 2009 | 82nd | 0 | 4 |
| Nine | 2009 | 82nd | 0 | 4 |
| An Education | 2009 | 82nd | 0 | 3 |
| The Princess and the Frog | 2009 | 82nd | 0 | 3 |
| A Serious Man | 2009 | 82nd | 0 | 2 |
| Fantastic Mr. Fox | 2009 | 82nd | 0 | 2 |
| Invictus | 2009 | 82nd | 0 | 2 |
| Sherlock Holmes | 2009 | 82nd | 0 | 2 |
| The Imaginarium of Doctor Parnassus | 2009 | 82nd | 0 | 2 |
| The Last Station | 2009 | 82nd | 0 | 2 |
| The Messenger | 2009 | 82nd | 0 | 2 |
| The White Ribbon | 2009 | 82nd | 0 | 2 |
| A Matter of Loaf and Death | 2008 | 82nd | 0 | 1 |
| A Prophet | 2009 | 82nd | 0 | 1 |
| A Single Man | 2009 | 82nd | 0 | 1 |
| Ajami | 2009 | 82nd | 0 | 1 |
| Bright Star | 2009 | 82nd | 0 | 1 |
| Burma VJ | 2008 | 82nd | 0 | 1 |
| China's Unnatural Disaster: The Tears of Sichuan Province | 2009 | 82nd | 0 | 1 |
| Coco Before Chanel | 2009 | 82nd | 0 | 1 |
| Coraline | 2009 | 82nd | 0 | 1 |
| Food, Inc. | 2008 | 82nd | 0 | 1 |
| French Roast | 2008 | 82nd | 0 | 1 |
| Granny O'Grimm's Sleeping Beauty | 2008 | 82nd | 0 | 1 |
| Harry Potter and the Half-Blood Prince | 2009 | 82nd | 0 | 1 |
| Il Divo | 2008 | 82nd | 0 | 1 |
| In the Loop | 2009 | 82nd | 0 | 1 |
| Instead of Abracadabra | 2008 | 82nd | 0 | 1 |
| Julie & Julia | 2009 | 82nd | 0 | 1 |
| Kavi | 2009 | 82nd | 0 | 1 |
| Miracle Fish | 2009 | 82nd | 0 | 1 |
| Paris 36 | 2008 | 82nd | 0 | 1 |
| Rabbit à la Berlin | 2009 | 82nd | 0 | 1 |
| The Door | 2009 | 82nd | 0 | 1 |
| The Lady and the Reaper | 2009 | 82nd | 0 | 1 |
| The Last Campaign of Governor Booth Gardner | 2009 | 82nd | 0 | 1 |
| The Last Truck: Closing of a GM Plant | 2009 | 82nd | 0 | 1 |
| The Lovely Bones | 2009 | 82nd | 0 | 1 |
| The Milk of Sorrow | 2009 | 82nd | 0 | 1 |
| The Most Dangerous Man in America | 2009 | 82nd | 0 | 1 |
| The Secret of Kells | 2009 | 82nd | 0 | 1 |
| Transformers: Revenge of the Fallen | 2009 | 82nd | 0 | 1 |
| Which Way Home | 2009 | 82nd | 0 | 1 |
| **The King's Speech** | 2010 | 83rd | 4 | 12 |
| Inception | 2010 | 83rd | 4 | 8 |
| The Social Network | 2010 | 83rd | 3 | 8 |
| The Fighter | 2010 | 83rd | 2 | 7 |
| Toy Story 3 | 2010 | 83rd | 2 | 5 |
| Alice in Wonderland | 2010 | 83rd | 2 | 3 |
| Black Swan | 2010 | 83rd | 1 | 5 |
| God of Love | 2010 | 83rd | 1 | 1 |
| In a Better World | 2010 | 83rd | 1 | 1 |
| Inside Job | 2010 | 83rd | 1 | 1 |
| Strangers No More | 2010 | 83rd | 1 | 1 |
| The Lost Thing | 2010 | 83rd | 1 | 1 |
| The Wolfman | 2010 | 83rd | 1 | 1 |
| True Grit | 2010 | 83rd | 0 | 10 |
| 127 Hours | 2010 | 83rd | 0 | 6 |
| The Kids Are All Right | 2010 | 83rd | 0 | 4 |
| Winter's Bone | 2010 | 83rd | 0 | 4 |
| Biutiful | 2010 | 83rd | 0 | 2 |
| Harry Potter and the Deathly Hallows – Part 1 | 2010 | 83rd | 0 | 2 |
| How to Train Your Dragon | 2010 | 83rd | 0 | 2 |
| Animal Kingdom | 2010 | 83rd | 0 | 1 |
| Another Year | 2010 | 83rd | 0 | 1 |
| Barney's Version | 2010 | 83rd | 0 | 1 |
| Blue Valentine | 2010 | 83rd | 0 | 1 |
| Country Strong | 2010 | 83rd | 0 | 1 |
| Day & Night | 2010 | 83rd | 0 | 1 |
| Dogtooth | 2009 | 83rd | 0 | 1 |
| Exit Through the Gift Shop | 2010 | 83rd | 0 | 1 |
| Gasland | 2010 | 83rd | 0 | 1 |
| Hereafter | 2010 | 83rd | 0 | 1 |
| I Am Love | 2009 | 83rd | 0 | 1 |
| Incendies | 2010 | 83rd | 0 | 1 |
| Iron Man 2 | 2010 | 83rd | 0 | 1 |
| Killing in the Name | 2010 | 83rd | 0 | 1 |
| Let's Pollute | 2009 | 83rd | 0 | 1 |
| Madagascar, a Journey Diary | 2009 | 83rd | 0 | 1 |
| Na Wewe | 2010 | 83rd | 0 | 1 |
| Outside the Law | 2010 | 83rd | 0 | 1 |
| Poster Girl | 2010 | 83rd | 0 | 1 |
| Rabbit Hole | 2010 | 83rd | 0 | 1 |
| Restrepo | 2010 | 83rd | 0 | 1 |
| Salt | 2010 | 83rd | 0 | 1 |
| Sun Come Up | 2010 | 83rd | 0 | 1 |
| Tangled | 2010 | 83rd | 0 | 1 |
| The Confession | 2010 | 83rd | 0 | 1 |
| The Crush | 2010 | 83rd | 0 | 1 |
| The Gruffalo | 2009 | 83rd | 0 | 1 |
| The Illusionist | 2010 | 83rd | 0 | 1 |
| The Tempest | 2010 | 83rd | 0 | 1 |
| The Town | 2010 | 83rd | 0 | 1 |
| The Warriors of Qiugang | 2010 | 83rd | 0 | 1 |
| The Way Back | 2010 | 83rd | 0 | 1 |
| Tron: Legacy | 2010 | 83rd | 0 | 1 |
| Unstoppable | 2010 | 83rd | 0 | 1 |
| Waste Land | 2010 | 83rd | 0 | 1 |
| Wish 143 | 2009 | 83rd | 0 | 1 |
| **The Artist** | 2011 | 84th | 5 | 10 |
| Hugo | 2011 | 84th | 5 | 11 |
| The Iron Lady | 2011 | 84th | 2 | 2 |
| The Descendants | 2011 | 84th | 1 | 5 |
| The Girl with the Dragon Tattoo | 2011 | 84th | 1 | 5 |
| Midnight in Paris | 2011 | 84th | 1 | 4 |
| The Help | 2011 | 84th | 1 | 4 |
| A Separation | 2011 | 84th | 1 | 2 |
| Beginners | 2010 | 84th | 1 | 1 |
| Rango | 2011 | 84th | 1 | 1 |
| Saving Face | 2012 | 84th | 1 | 1 |
| The Fantastic Flying Books of Mr. Morris Lessmore | 2011 | 84th | 1 | 1 |
| The Muppets | 2011 | 84th | 1 | 1 |
| The Shore | 2011 | 84th | 1 | 1 |
| Undefeated | 2011 | 84th | 1 | 1 |
| Moneyball | 2011 | 84th | 0 | 6 |
| War Horse | 2011 | 84th | 0 | 6 |
| Albert Nobbs | 2011 | 84th | 0 | 3 |
| Harry Potter and the Deathly Hallows – Part 2 | 2011 | 84th | 0 | 3 |
| The Tree of Life | 2011 | 84th | 0 | 3 |
| Tinker Tailor Soldier Spy | 2011 | 84th | 0 | 3 |
| Transformers: Dark of the Moon | 2011 | 84th | 0 | 3 |
| Bridesmaids | 2011 | 84th | 0 | 2 |
| Extremely Loud & Incredibly Close | 2011 | 84th | 0 | 2 |
| My Week with Marilyn | 2011 | 84th | 0 | 2 |
| A Better Life | 2011 | 84th | 0 | 1 |
| A Cat in Paris | 2010 | 84th | 0 | 1 |
| A Morning Stroll | 2011 | 84th | 0 | 1 |
| Anonymous | 2011 | 84th | 0 | 1 |
| Bullhead | 2011 | 84th | 0 | 1 |
| Chico and Rita | 2010 | 84th | 0 | 1 |
| Sunday | 2011 | 84th | 0 | 1 |
| Drive | 2011 | 84th | 0 | 1 |
| Footnote | 2011 | 84th | 0 | 1 |
| God Is the Bigger Elvis | 2012 | 84th | 0 | 1 |
| Hell and Back Again | 2011 | 84th | 0 | 1 |
| If a Tree Falls: A Story of the Earth Liberation Front | 2011 | 84th | 0 | 1 |
| In Darkness | 2011 | 84th | 0 | 1 |
| Incident in New Baghdad | 2011 | 84th | 0 | 1 |
| Jane Eyre | 2011 | 84th | 0 | 1 |
| Kung Fu Panda 2 | 2011 | 84th | 0 | 1 |
| La Luna | 2011 | 84th | 0 | 1 |
| Margin Call | 2011 | 84th | 0 | 1 |
| Monsieur Lazhar | 2011 | 84th | 0 | 1 |
| Paradise Lost 3: Purgatory | 2011 | 84th | 0 | 1 |
| Pentecost | 2011 | 84th | 0 | 1 |
| Pina | 2011 | 84th | 0 | 1 |
| Puss in Boots | 2011 | 84th | 0 | 1 |
| Raju | 2012 | 84th | 0 | 1 |
| Real Steel | 2011 | 84th | 0 | 1 |
| Rio | 2011 | 84th | 0 | 1 |
| Rise of the Planet of the Apes | 2011 | 84th | 0 | 1 |
| The Adventures of Tintin | 2011 | 84th | 0 | 1 |
| The Barber of Birmingham | 2011 | 84th | 0 | 1 |
| The Ides of March | 2011 | 84th | 0 | 1 |
| The Tsunami and the Cherry Blossom | 2011 | 84th | 0 | 1 |
| Time Freak | 2011 | 84th | 0 | 1 |
| Tuba Atlantic | 2010 | 84th | 0 | 0 |
| W.E. | 2011 | 84th | 0 | 1 |
| Warrior | 2011 | 84th | 0 | 1 |
| Wild Life | 2011 | 84th | 0 | 1 |
| **Argo** | 2012 | 85th | 3 | 7 |
| Life of Pi | 2012 | 85th | 4 | 11 |
| Les Misérables | 2012 | 85th | 3 | 8 |
| Lincoln | 2012 | 85th | 2 | 12 |
| Django Unchained | 2012 | 85th | 2 | 5 |
| Skyfall | 2012 | 85th | 2 | 5 |
| Silver Linings Playbook | 2012 | 85th | 1 | 8 |
| Amour | 2012 | 85th | 1 | 5 |
| Zero Dark Thirty | 2012 | 85th | 1 | 5 |
| Anna Karenina | 2012 | 85th | 1 | 4 |
| Brave | 2012 | 85th | 1 | 1 |
| Curfew | 2012 | 85th | 1 | 1 |
| Inocente | 2012 | 85th | 1 | 1 |
| Paperman | 2012 | 85th | 1 | 1 |
| Searching for Sugar Man | 2012 | 85th | 1 | 1 |
| Beasts of the Southern Wild | 2012 | 85th | 0 | 4 |
| The Hobbit: An Unexpected Journey | 2012 | 85th | 0 | 3 |
| The Master | 2012 | 85th | 0 | 3 |
| Flight | 2012 | 85th | 0 | 2 |
| Snow White and the Huntsman | 2012 | 85th | 0 | 2 |
| 5 Broken Cameras | 2011 | 85th | 0 | 1 |
| A Royal Affair | 2012 | 85th | 0 | 1 |
| Adam and Dog | 2011 | 85th | 0 | 1 |
| Asad | 2012 | 85th | 0 | 1 |
| Buzkashi Boys | 2012 | 85th | 0 | 1 |
| Chasing Ice | 2012 | 85th | 0 | 1 |
| Death of a Shadow | 2012 | 85th | 0 | 1 |
| Frankenweenie | 2012 | 85th | 0 | 1 |
| Fresh Guacamole | 2012 | 85th | 0 | 1 |
| Head over Heels | 2012 | 85th | 0 | 1 |
| Henry | 2011 | 85th | 0 | 1 |
| Hitchcock | 2012 | 85th | 0 | 1 |
| How to Survive a Plague | 2012 | 85th | 0 | 1 |
| Kings Point | 2012 | 85th | 0 | 1 |
| Kon-Tiki | 2012 | 85th | 0 | 1 |
| Mirror Mirror | 2012 | 85th | 0 | 1 |
| Mondays at Racine | 2012 | 85th | 0 | 1 |
| Moonrise Kingdom | 2012 | 85th | 0 | 1 |
| No | 2012 | 85th | 0 | 1 |
| Open Heart | 2012 | 85th | 0 | 1 |
| ParaNorman | 2012 | 85th | 0 | 1 |
| Prometheus | 2012 | 85th | 0 | 1 |
| Redemption | 2012 | 85th | 0 | 1 |
| Ted | 2012 | 85th | 0 | 1 |
| The Avengers | 2012 | 85th | 0 | 1 |
| The Gatekeepers | 2012 | 85th | 0 | 1 |
| The Impossible | 2012 | 85th | 0 | 1 |
| The Invisible War | 2012 | 85th | 0 | 1 |
| The Longest Daycare | 2012 | 85th | 0 | 1 |
| The Pirates! Band of Misfits | 2012 | 85th | 0 | 1 |
| The Sessions | 2012 | 85th | 0 | 1 |
| War Witch | 2012 | 85th | 0 | 1 |
| Wreck-It Ralph | 2012 | 85th | 0 | 1 |
| **12 Years a Slave** | 2013 | 86th | 3 | 9 |
| Gravity | 2013 | 86th | 7 | 10 |
| Dallas Buyers Club | 2013 | 86th | 3 | 6 |
| Frozen | 2013 | 86th | 2 | 2 |
| The Great Gatsby | 2013 | 86th | 2 | 2 |
| Her | 2013 | 86th | 1 | 5 |
| Blue Jasmine | 2013 | 86th | 1 | 3 |
| 20 Feet from Stardom | 2013 | 86th | 1 | 1 |
| Helium | 2014 | 86th | 1 | 1 |
| Mr Hublot | 2013 | 86th | 1 | 1 |
| The Great Beauty | 2013 | 86th | 1 | 1 |
| The Lady in Number 6: Music Saved My Life | 2013 | 86th | 1 | 1 |
| American Hustle | 2013 | 86th | 0 | 10 |
| Captain Phillips | 2013 | 86th | 0 | 6 |
| Nebraska | 2013 | 86th | 0 | 6 |
| The Wolf of Wall Street | 2013 | 86th | 0 | 5 |
| Philomena | 2013 | 86th | 0 | 4 |
| The Hobbit: The Desolation of Smaug | 2013 | 86th | 0 | 3 |
| August: Osage County | 2013 | 86th | 0 | 2 |
| Despicable Me 2 | 2013 | 86th | 0 | 2 |
| Inside Llewyn Davis | 2013 | 86th | 0 | 2 |
| Lone Survivor | 2013 | 86th | 0 | 2 |
| The Grandmaster | 2013 | 86th | 0 | 2 |
| The Lone Ranger | 2013 | 86th | 0 | 2 |
| All Is Lost | 2013 | 86th | 0 | 1 |
| Alone yet Not Alone | 2013 | 86th | 0 | 0 |
| Before Midnight | 2013 | 86th | 0 | 1 |
| Cavedigger | 2013 | 86th | 0 | 1 |
| Cutie and the Boxer | 2013 | 86th | 0 | 1 |
| Dirty Wars | 2013 | 86th | 0 | 1 |
| Do I Have to Take Care of Everything? | 2012 | 86th | 0 | 1 |
| Ernest & Celestine | 2012 | 86th | 0 | 1 |
| Facing Fear | 2013 | 86th | 0 | 1 |
| Feral | 2012 | 86th | 0 | 1 |
| Get a Horse! | 2013 | 86th | 0 | 1 |
| Iron Man 3 | 2013 | 86th | 0 | 1 |
| Jackass Presents: Bad Grandpa | 2013 | 86th | 0 | 1 |
| Just Before Losing Everything | 2013 | 86th | 0 | 1 |
| Karama Has No Walls | 2012 | 86th | 0 | 1 |
| Mandela: Long Walk to Freedom | 2013 | 86th | 0 | 1 |
| Omar | 2013 | 86th | 0 | 1 |
| Possessions | 2013 | 86th | 0 | 1 |
| Prison Terminal: The Last Days of Private Jack Hall | 2013 | 86th | 0 | 1 |
| Prisoners | 2013 | 86th | 0 | 1 |
| Room on the Broom | 2012 | 86th | 0 | 1 |
| Saving Mr. Banks | 2013 | 86th | 0 | 1 |
| Star Trek Into Darkness | 2013 | 86th | 0 | 1 |
| That Wasn't Me | 2012 | 86th | 0 | 1 |
| The Act of Killing | 2012 | 86th | 0 | 1 |
| The Book Thief | 2013 | 86th | 0 | 1 |
| The Broken Circle Breakdown | 2012 | 86th | 0 | 1 |
| The Croods | 2013 | 86th | 0 | 1 |
| The Hunt | 2012 | 86th | 0 | 1 |
| The Invisible Woman | 2013 | 86th | 0 | 1 |
| The Missing Picture | 2013 | 86th | 0 | 1 |
| The Square | 2013 | 86th | 0 | 1 |
| The Voorman Problem | 2011 | 86th | 0 | 1 |
| The Wind Rises | 2013 | 86th | 0 | 1 |
| **Birdman or (The Unexpected Virtue of Ignorance)** | 2014 | 87th | 4 | 9 |
| The Grand Budapest Hotel | 2014 | 87th | 4 | 9 |
| Whiplash | 2014 | 87th | 3 | 5 |
| The Imitation Game | 2014 | 87th | 1 | 8 |
| American Sniper | 2014 | 87th | 1 | 6 |
| Boyhood | 2014 | 87th | 1 | 6 |
| Interstellar | 2014 | 87th | 1 | 5 |
| The Theory of Everything | 2014 | 87th | 1 | 5 |
| Ida | 2013 | 87th | 1 | 2 |
| Selma | 2014 | 87th | 1 | 2 |
| Big Hero 6 | 2014 | 87th | 1 | 1 |
| Citizenfour | 2014 | 87th | 1 | 1 |
| Crisis Hotline: Veterans Press 1 | 2013 | 87th | 1 | 1 |
| Feast | 2014 | 87th | 1 | 1 |
| Still Alice | 2014 | 87th | 1 | 1 |
| The Phone Call | 2013 | 87th | 1 | 1 |
| Foxcatcher | 2014 | 87th | 0 | 5 |
| Mr. Turner | 2014 | 87th | 0 | 4 |
| Into the Woods | 2014 | 87th | 0 | 3 |
| Unbroken | 2014 | 87th | 0 | 3 |
| Guardians of the Galaxy | 2014 | 87th | 0 | 2 |
| Inherent Vice | 2014 | 87th | 0 | 2 |
| Wild | 2014 | 87th | 0 | 2 |
| A Single Life | 2014 | 87th | 0 | 1 |
| Aya | 2012 | 87th | 0 | 1 |
| Begin Again | 2013 | 87th | 0 | 1 |
| Beyond the Lights | 2014 | 87th | 0 | 1 |
| Boogaloo and Graham | 2014 | 87th | 0 | 1 |
| Butter Lamp | 2013 | 87th | 0 | 1 |
| Captain America: The Winter Soldier | 2014 | 87th | 0 | 1 |
| Dawn of the Planet of the Apes | 2014 | 87th | 0 | 1 |
| Finding Vivian Maier | 2013 | 87th | 0 | 1 |
| Glen Campbell: I'll Be Me | 2014 | 87th | 0 | 1 |
| Gone Girl | 2014 | 87th | 0 | 1 |
| How to Train Your Dragon 2 | 2014 | 87th | 0 | 1 |
| Joanna | 2013 | 87th | 0 | 1 |
| Last Days in Vietnam | 2014 | 87th | 0 | 1 |
| Leviathan | 2014 | 87th | 0 | 1 |
| Maleficent | 2014 | 87th | 0 | 1 |
| Me and My Moulton | 2014 | 87th | 0 | 1 |
| Nightcrawler | 2014 | 87th | 0 | 1 |
| Our Curse | 2013 | 87th | 0 | 1 |
| Parvaneh | 2012 | 87th | 0 | 1 |
| Song of the Sea | 2014 | 87th | 0 | 1 |
| Tangerines | 2013 | 87th | 0 | 1 |
| The Bigger Picture | 2014 | 87th | 0 | 1 |
| The Boxtrolls | 2014 | 87th | 0 | 1 |
| The Dam Keeper | 2014 | 87th | 0 | 1 |
| The Hobbit: The Battle of the Five Armies | 2014 | 87th | 0 | 1 |
| The Judge | 2014 | 87th | 0 | 1 |
| The Lego Movie | 2014 | 87th | 0 | 1 |
| The Reaper | 2013 | 87th | 0 | 1 |
| The Salt of the Earth | 2014 | 87th | 0 | 1 |
| The Tale of the Princess Kaguya | 2013 | 87th | 0 | 1 |
| Timbuktu | 2014 | 87th | 0 | 1 |
| Two Days, One Night | 2014 | 87th | 0 | 1 |
| Virunga | 2014 | 87th | 0 | 1 |
| White Earth | 2014 | 87th | 0 | 1 |
| Wild Tales | 2014 | 87th | 0 | 1 |
| X-Men: Days of Future Past | 2014 | 87th | 0 | 1 |
| **Spotlight** | 2015 | 88th | 2 | 6 |
| Mad Max: Fury Road | 2015 | 88th | 6 | 10 |
| The Revenant | 2015 | 88th | 3 | 12 |
| Bridge of Spies | 2015 | 88th | 1 | 6 |
| The Big Short | 2015 | 88th | 1 | 5 |
| Room | 2015 | 88th | 1 | 4 |
| The Danish Girl | 2015 | 88th | 1 | 4 |
| The Hateful Eight | 2015 | 88th | 1 | 3 |
| Ex Machina | 2014 | 88th | 1 | 2 |
| Inside Out | 2015 | 88th | 1 | 2 |
| A Girl in the River: The Price of Forgiveness | 2015 | 88th | 1 | 1 |
| Amy | 2015 | 88th | 1 | 1 |
| Bear Story | 2014 | 88th | 1 | 1 |
| Son of Saul | 2015 | 88th | 1 | 1 |
| Spectre | 2015 | 88th | 1 | 1 |
| Stutterer | 2015 | 88th | 1 | 1 |
| The Martian | 2015 | 88th | 0 | 7 |
| Carol | 2015 | 88th | 0 | 6 |
| Star Wars Episode VII: The Force Awakens | 2015 | 88th | 0 | 5 |
| Brooklyn | 2015 | 88th | 0 | 3 |
| Sicario | 2015 | 88th | 0 | 3 |
| Steve Jobs | 2015 | 88th | 0 | 2 |
| 45 Years | 2015 | 88th | 0 | 1 |
| A War | 2015 | 88th | 0 | 1 |
| Anomalisa | 2015 | 88th | 0 | 1 |
| Ave Maria | 2015 | 88th | 0 | 1 |
| Body Team 12 | 2015 | 88th | 0 | 1 |
| Boy and the World | 2013 | 88th | 0 | 1 |
| Cartel Land | 2015 | 88th | 0 | 1 |
| Chau, Beyond the Lines | 2015 | 88th | 0 | 1 |
| Cinderella | 2015 | 88th | 0 | 1 |
| Claude Lanzmann: Spectres of the Shoah | 2015 | 88th | 0 | 1 |
| Creed | 2015 | 88th | 0 | 1 |
| Day One | 2015 | 88th | 0 | 1 |
| Embrace of the Serpent | 2015 | 88th | 0 | 1 |
| Everything Will Be Okay | 2015 | 88th | 0 | 1 |
| Fifty Shades of Grey | 2015 | 88th | 0 | 1 |
| Joy | 2015 | 88th | 0 | 1 |
| Last Day of Freedom | 2015 | 88th | 0 | 1 |
| Mustang | 2015 | 88th | 0 | 1 |
| Prologue | 2015 | 88th | 0 | 1 |
| Racing Extinction | 2015 | 88th | 0 | 1 |
| Sanjay's Super Team | 2015 | 88th | 0 | 1 |
| Shaun the Sheep Movie | 2015 | 88th | 0 | 1 |
| Shok | 2015 | 88th | 0 | 1 |
| Straight Outta Compton | 2015 | 88th | 0 | 1 |
| The 100-Year-Old Man Who Climbed Out of the Window and Disappeared | 2013 | 88th | 0 | 1 |
| The Hunting Ground | 2015 | 88th | 0 | 1 |
| The Look of Silence | 2014 | 88th | 0 | 1 |
| Theeb | 2014 | 88th | 0 | 1 |
| Trumbo | 2015 | 88th | 0 | 1 |
| We Can't Live Without Cosmos | 2015 | 88th | 0 | 1 |
| What Happened, Miss Simone? | 2015 | 88th | 0 | 1 |
| When Marnie Was There | 2014 | 88th | 0 | 1 |
| Winter on Fire: Ukraine's Fight for Freedom | 2015 | 88th | 0 | 1 |
| World of Tomorrow | 2015 | 88th | 0 | 1 |
| Youth | 2015 | 88th | 0 | 1 |
| **Moonlight** | 2016 | 89th | 3 | 8 |
| La La Land | 2016 | 89th | 6 | 14 |
| Hacksaw Ridge | 2016 | 89th | 2 | 6 |
| Manchester by the Sea | 2016 | 89th | 2 | 6 |
| Arrival | 2016 | 89th | 1 | 8 |
| Fences | 2016 | 89th | 1 | 4 |
| Fantastic Beasts and Where to Find Them | 2016 | 89th | 1 | 2 |
| O.J.: Made in America | 2016 | 89th | 1 | 1 |
| Piper | 2016 | 89th | 1 | 1 |
| Sing | 2016 | 89th | 1 | 1 |
| Suicide Squad | 2016 | 89th | 1 | 1 |
| The Jungle Book | 2016 | 89th | 1 | 1 |
| The Salesman | 2016 | 89th | 1 | 1 |
| The White Helmets | 2016 | 89th | 1 | 1 |
| Zootopia | 2016 | 89th | 1 | 1 |
| Lion | 2016 | 89th | 0 | 6 |
| Hell or High Water | 2016 | 89th | 0 | 4 |
| Hidden Figures | 2016 | 89th | 0 | 3 |
| Jackie | 2016 | 89th | 0 | 3 |
| A Man Called Ove | 2015 | 89th | 0 | 2 |
| Deepwater Horizon | 2016 | 89th | 0 | 2 |
| Florence Foster Jenkins | 2016 | 89th | 0 | 2 |
| Kubo and the Two Strings | 2016 | 89th | 0 | 2 |
| Moana | 2016 | 89th | 0 | 2 |
| Passengers | 2016 | 89th | 0 | 2 |
| Rogue One: A Star Wars Story | 2016 | 89th | 0 | 2 |
| 13 Hours: The Secret Soldiers of Benghazi | 2016 | 89th | 0 | 1 |
| 13th | 2016 | 89th | 0 | 1 |
| 20th Century Women | 2016 | 89th | 0 | 1 |
| 4.1 Miles | 2016 | 89th | 0 | 1 |
| Allied | 2016 | 89th | 0 | 1 |
| Blind Vaysha | 2016 | 89th | 0 | 1 |
| Borrowed Time | 2015 | 89th | 0 | 1 |
| Captain Fantastic | 2016 | 89th | 0 | 1 |
| Doctor Strange | 2016 | 89th | 0 | 1 |
| Elle | 2016 | 89th | 0 | 1 |
| Ennemis intérieurs | 2016 | 89th | 0 | 1 |
| Extremis | 2016 | 89th | 0 | 1 |
| Fire at Sea | 2016 | 89th | 0 | 1 |
| Hail, Caesar! | 2016 | 89th | 0 | 1 |
| I Am Not Your Negro | 2016 | 89th | 0 | 1 |
| Jim: The James Foley Story | 2016 | 89th | 0 | 1 |
| Joe's Violin | 2016 | 89th | 0 | 1 |
| La femme et le TGV | 2016 | 89th | 0 | 1 |
| Land of Mine | 2015 | 89th | 0 | 1 |
| Life, Animated | 2016 | 89th | 0 | 1 |
| Loving | 2016 | 89th | 0 | 1 |
| My Life as a Zucchini | 2016 | 89th | 0 | 1 |
| Nocturnal Animals | 2016 | 89th | 0 | 1 |
| Pear Cider and Cigarettes | 2016 | 89th | 0 | 1 |
| Pearl | 2016 | 89th | 0 | 1 |
| Silence | 2016 | 89th | 0 | 1 |
| Silent Nights | 2017 | 89th | 0 | 1 |
| Star Trek Beyond | 2016 | 89th | 0 | 1 |
| Sully | 2016 | 89th | 0 | 1 |
| Tanna | 2015 | 89th | 0 | 1 |
| The Lobster | 2015 | 89th | 0 | 1 |
| The Red Turtle | 2016 | 89th | 0 | 1 |
| Timecode | 2016 | 89th | 0 | 1 |
| Toni Erdmann | 2016 | 89th | 0 | 1 |
| Trolls | 2016 | 89th | 0 | 1 |
| Watani: My Homeland | 2016 | 89th | 0 | 1 |
| **The Shape of Water** | 2017 | 90th | 4 | 13 |
| Dunkirk | 2017 | 90th | 3 | 8 |
| Three Billboards Outside Ebbing, Missouri | 2017 | 90th | 2 | 7 |
| Darkest Hour | 2017 | 90th | 2 | 6 |
| Blade Runner 2049 | 2017 | 90th | 2 | 5 |
| Coco | 2017 | 90th | 2 | 2 |
| Phantom Thread | 2017 | 90th | 1 | 6 |
| Call Me by Your Name | 2017 | 90th | 1 | 4 |
| Get Out | 2017 | 90th | 1 | 4 |
| I, Tonya | 2017 | 90th | 1 | 3 |
| A Fantastic Woman | 2017 | 90th | 1 | 1 |
| Dear Basketball | 2017 | 90th | 1 | 1 |
| Heaven Is a Traffic Jam on the 405 | 2016 | 90th | 1 | 1 |
| Icarus | 2017 | 90th | 1 | 1 |
| The Silent Child | 2017 | 90th | 1 | 1 |
| Lady Bird | 2017 | 90th | 0 | 5 |
| Mudbound | 2017 | 90th | 0 | 4 |
| Star Wars Episode VIII: The Last Jedi | 2017 | 90th | 0 | 4 |
| Baby Driver | 2017 | 90th | 0 | 3 |
| Beauty and the Beast | 2017 | 90th | 0 | 2 |
| The Post | 2017 | 90th | 0 | 2 |
| Victoria & Abdul | 2017 | 90th | 0 | 2 |
| Abacus: Small Enough to Jail | 2016 | 90th | 0 | 1 |
| All the Money in the World | 2017 | 90th | 0 | 1 |
| DeKalb Elementary | 2017 | 90th | 0 | 1 |
| Edith+Eddie | 2017 | 90th | 0 | 1 |
| Faces Places | 2017 | 90th | 0 | 1 |
| Ferdinand | 2017 | 90th | 0 | 1 |
| Garden Party | 2017 | 90th | 0 | 1 |
| Guardians of the Galaxy Vol. 2 | 2017 | 90th | 0 | 1 |
| Heroin(e) | 2017 | 90th | 0 | 1 |
| Knife Skills | 2017 | 90th | 0 | 1 |
| Kong: Skull Island | 2017 | 90th | 0 | 1 |
| Last Men in Aleppo | 2017 | 90th | 0 | 1 |
| Logan | 2017 | 90th | 0 | 1 |
| Lou | 2017 | 90th | 0 | 1 |
| Loveless | 2017 | 90th | 0 | 1 |
| Loving Vincent | 2017 | 90th | 0 | 1 |
| Marshall | 2017 | 90th | 0 | 1 |
| Molly's Game | 2017 | 90th | 0 | 1 |
| My Nephew Emmett | 2017 | 90th | 0 | 1 |
| Negative Space | 2017 | 90th | 0 | 1 |
| On Body and Soul | 2017 | 90th | 0 | 1 |
| Revolting Rhymes | 2016 | 90th | 0 | 1 |
| Roman J. Israel, Esq. | 2017 | 90th | 0 | 1 |
| Strong Island | 2017 | 90th | 0 | 1 |
| The Big Sick | 2017 | 90th | 0 | 1 |
| The Boss Baby | 2017 | 90th | 0 | 1 |
| The Breadwinner | 2017 | 90th | 0 | 1 |
| The Disaster Artist | 2017 | 90th | 0 | 1 |
| The Eleven O'Clock | 2016 | 90th | 0 | 1 |
| The Florida Project | 2017 | 90th | 0 | 1 |
| The Greatest Showman | 2017 | 90th | 0 | 1 |
| The Insult | 2017 | 90th | 0 | 1 |
| The Square | 2017 | 90th | 0 | 1 |
| Traffic Stop | 2017 | 90th | 0 | 1 |
| War for the Planet of the Apes | 2017 | 90th | 0 | 1 |
| Watu Wote/All of Us | 2017 | 90th | 0 | 1 |
| Wonder | 2017 | 90th | 0 | 1 |
| Carne y Arena | 2017 | 90th | 0 (1) | 0 |
| **Green Book** | 2018 | 91st | 3 | 5 |
| Bohemian Rhapsody | 2018 | 91st | 4 | 5 |
| Roma | 2018 | 91st | 3 | 10 |
| Black Panther | 2018 | 91st | 3 | 7 |
| The Favourite | 2018 | 91st | 1 | 10 |
| A Star is Born | 2018 | 91st | 1 | 8 |
| Vice | 2018 | 91st | 1 | 8 |
| BlacKkKlansman | 2018 | 91st | 1 | 6 |
| First Man | 2018 | 91st | 1 | 4 |
| If Beale Street Could Talk | 2018 | 91st | 1 | 3 |
| Bao | 2018 | 91st | 1 | 1 |
| Free Solo | 2018 | 91st | 1 | 1 |
| Period. End of Sentence. | 2018 | 91st | 1 | 1 |
| Skin | 2018 | 91st | 1 | 1 |
| Spider-Man: Into the Spider-Verse | 2018 | 91st | 1 | 1 |
| Mary Poppins Returns | 2018 | 91st | 0 | 4 |
| Can You Ever Forgive Me? | 2018 | 91st | 0 | 3 |
| Cold War | 2018 | 91st | 0 | 3 |
| The Ballad of Buster Scruggs | 2018 | 91st | 0 | 3 |
| Isle of Dogs | 2018 | 91st | 0 | 2 |
| Mary Queen of Scots | 2018 | 91st | 0 | 2 |
| Never Look Away | 2018 | 91st | 0 | 2 |
| RBG | 2018 | 91st | 0 | 2 |
| A Night at the Garden | 2017 | 91st | 0 | 1 |
| A Quiet Place | 2018 | 91st | 0 | 1 |
| Animal Behaviour | 2018 | 91st | 0 | 1 |
| At Eternity's Gate | 2018 | 91st | 0 | 1 |
| Avengers: Infinity War | 2018 | 91st | 0 | 1 |
| Black Sheep | 2018 | 91st | 0 | 1 |
| Border | 2018 | 91st | 0 | 1 |
| Capernaum | 2018 | 91st | 0 | 1 |
| Christopher Robin | 2018 | 91st | 0 | 1 |
| Detainment | 2018 | 91st | 0 | 1 |
| End Game | 2018 | 91st | 0 | 1 |
| Fauve | 2018 | 91st | 0 | 1 |
| First Reformed | 2017 | 91st | 0 | 1 |
| Hale County This Morning, This Evening | 2018 | 91st | 0 | 1 |
| Incredibles 2 | 2018 | 91st | 0 | 1 |
| Late Afternoon | 2017 | 91st | 0 | 1 |
| Lifeboat | 2018 | 91st | 0 | 1 |
| Marguerite | 2017 | 91st | 0 | 1 |
| Minding the Gap | 2018 | 91st | 0 | 1 |
| Mirai | 2018 | 91st | 0 | 1 |
| Mother | 2017 | 91st | 0 | 1 |
| Of Fathers and Sons | 2017 | 91st | 0 | 1 |
| One Small Step | 2018 | 91st | 0 | 1 |
| Ralph Breaks the Internet | 2018 | 91st | 0 | 1 |
| Ready Player One | 2018 | 91st | 0 | 1 |
| Shoplifters | 2018 | 91st | 0 | 1 |
| Solo: A Star Wars Story | 2018 | 91st | 0 | 1 |
| The Wife | 2017 | 91st | 0 | 1 |
| Weekends | 2017 | 91st | 0 | 1 |
| **Parasite** | 2019 | 92nd | 4 | 6 |
| 1917 | 2019 | 92nd | 3 | 10 |
| Joker | 2019 | 92nd | 2 | 11 |
| Once Upon a Time in Hollywood | 2019 | 92nd | 2 | 10 |
| Ford v Ferrari | 2019 | 92nd | 2 | 4 |
| Jojo Rabbit | 2019 | 92nd | 1 | 6 |
| Little Women | 2019 | 92nd | 1 | 6 |
| Marriage Story | 2019 | 92nd | 1 | 6 |
| Bombshell | 2019 | 92nd | 1 | 3 |
| Judy | 2019 | 92nd | 1 | 2 |
| Toy Story 4 | 2019 | 92nd | 1 | 2 |
| American Factory | 2019 | 92nd | 1 | 1 |
| Hair Love | 2019 | 92nd | 1 | 1 |
| Learning to Skateboard in a Warzone (If You're a Girl) | 2019 | 92nd | 1 | 1 |
| Rocketman | 2019 | 92nd | 1 | 1 |
| The Neighbors' Window | 2019 | 92nd | 1 | 1 |
| The Irishman | 2019 | 92nd | 0 | 10 |
| Star Wars: The Rise of Skywalker | 2019 | 92nd | 0 | 3 |
| The Two Popes | 2019 | 92nd | 0 | 3 |
| Harriet | 2019 | 92nd | 0 | 2 |
| Honeyland | 2019 | 92nd | 0 | 2 |
| Pain and Glory | 2019 | 92nd | 0 | 2 |
| A Beautiful Day in the Neighborhood | 2019 | 92nd | 0 | 1 |
| A Sister | 2018 | 92nd | 0 | 1 |
| Ad Astra | 2019 | 92nd | 0 | 1 |
| Avengers: Endgame | 2019 | 92nd | 0 | 1 |
| Breakthrough | 2019 | 92nd | 0 | 1 |
| Brotherhood | 2018 | 92nd | 0 | 1 |
| Corpus Christi | 2019 | 92nd | 0 | 1 |
| Dcera (Daughter) | 2019 | 92nd | 0 | 1 |
| For Sama | 2019 | 92nd | 0 | 1 |
| Frozen II | 2019 | 92nd | 0 | 1 |
| How to Train Your Dragon: The Hidden World | 2019 | 92nd | 0 | 1 |
| I Lost My Body | 2019 | 92nd | 0 | 1 |
| In the Absence | 2018 | 92nd | 0 | 1 |
| Kitbull | 2019 | 92nd | 0 | 1 |
| Klaus | 2019 | 92nd | 0 | 1 |
| Knives Out | 2019 | 92nd | 0 | 1 |
| Les Misérables | 2019 | 92nd | 0 | 1 |
| Life Overtakes Me | 2019 | 92nd | 0 | 1 |
| Maleficent: Mistress of Evil | 2019 | 92nd | 0 | 1 |
| Mémorable | 2019 | 92nd | 0 | 1 |
| Missing Link | 2019 | 92nd | 0 | 1 |
| Nefta Football Club | 2018 | 92nd | 0 | 1 |
| Richard Jewell | 2019 | 92nd | 0 | 1 |
| Saria | 2019 | 92nd | 0 | 1 |
| Sister | 2018 | 92nd | 0 | 1 |
| St. Louis Superman | 2019 | 92nd | 0 | 1 |
| The Cave | 2019 | 92nd | 0 | 1 |
| The Edge of Democracy | 2019 | 92nd | 0 | 1 |
| The Lighthouse | 2019 | 92nd | 0 | 1 |
| The Lion King | 2019 | 92nd | 0 | 1 |
| Walk Run Cha-Cha | 2019 | 92nd | 0 | 1 |
| **Nomadland** | 2020 | 93rd | 3 | 6 |
| Mank | 2020 | 93rd | 2 | 10 |
| Judas and the Black Messiah | 2021 | 93rd | 2 | 6 |
| Sound of Metal | 2019 | 93rd | 2 | 6 |
| The Father | 2020 | 93rd | 2 | 6 |
| Ma Rainey's Black Bottom | 2020 | 93rd | 2 | 5 |
| Soul | 2020 | 93rd | 2 | 3 |
| Minari | 2020 | 93rd | 1 | 6 |
| Promising Young Woman | 2020 | 93rd | 1 | 5 |
| Another Round | 2020 | 93rd | 1 | 2 |
| Tenet | 2020 | 93rd | 1 | 2 |
| Colette | 2020 | 93rd | 1 | 1 |
| If Anything Happens I Love You | 2020 | 93rd | 1 | 1 |
| My Octopus Teacher | 2020 | 93rd | 1 | 1 |
| Two Distant Strangers | 2020 | 93rd | 1 | 1 |
| The Trial of the Chicago 7 | 2020 | 93rd | 0 | 6 |
| News of the World | 2020 | 93rd | 0 | 4 |
| One Night in Miami | 2020 | 93rd | 0 | 3 |
| Borat Subsequent Moviefilm: Delivery of Prodigious Bribe to American Regime for Make Benefit Once Glorious Nation of Kazakhstan | 2020 | 93rd | 0 | 2 |
| Collective | 2019 | 93rd | 0 | 2 |
| Emma | 2020 | 93rd | 0 | 2 |
| Hillbilly Elegy | 2020 | 93rd | 0 | 2 |
| Mulan | 2020 | 93rd | 0 | 2 |
| Pinocchio | 2019 | 93rd | 0 | 2 |
| A Concerto Is a Conversation | 2021 | 93rd | 0 | 1 |
| A Love Song for Latasha | 2019 | 93rd | 0 | 1 |
| A Shaun the Sheep Movie: Farmageddon | 2019 | 93rd | 0 | 1 |
| Better Days | 2019 | 93rd | 0 | 1 |
| Burrow | 2020 | 93rd | 0 | 1 |
| Crip Camp | 2020 | 93rd | 0 | 1 |
| Da 5 Bloods | 2020 | 93rd | 0 | 1 |
| Do Not Split | 2020 | 93rd | 0 | 1 |
| Eurovision Song Contest: The Story of Fire Saga | 2020 | 93rd | 0 | 1 |
| Feeling Through | 2019 | 93rd | 0 | 1 |
| Genius Loci | 2020 | 93rd | 0 | 1 |
| Greyhound | 2020 | 93rd | 0 | 1 |
| Hunger Ward | 2020 | 93rd | 0 | 1 |
| Love and Monsters | 2020 | 93rd | 0 | 1 |
| Onward | 2020 | 93rd | 0 | 1 |
| Opera | 2020 | 93rd | 0 | 1 |
| Over the Moon | 2020 | 93rd | 0 | 1 |
| Pieces of a Woman | 2020 | 93rd | 0 | 1 |
| Quo Vadis, Aida? | 2020 | 93rd | 0 | 1 |
| The Letter Room | 2020 | 93rd | 0 | 1 |
| The Life Ahead | 2020 | 93rd | 0 | 1 |
| The Man Who Sold His Skin | 2020 | 93rd | 0 | 1 |
| The Midnight Sky | 2020 | 93rd | 0 | 1 |
| The Mole Agent | 2020 | 93rd | 0 | 1 |
| The One and Only Ivan | 2020 | 93rd | 0 | 1 |
| The Present | 2020 | 93rd | 0 | 1 |
| The United States vs. Billie Holiday | 2021 | 93rd | 0 | 1 |
| The White Tiger | 2021 | 93rd | 0 | 1 |
| Time | 2020 | 93rd | 0 | 1 |
| White Eye | 2019 | 93rd | 0 | 1 |
| Wolfwalkers | 2020 | 93rd | 0 | 1 |
| Yes-People | 2020 | 93rd | 0 | 1 |
| **CODA** | 2021 | 94th | 3 | 3 |
| Dune | 2021 | 94th | 6 | 10 |
| The Eyes of Tammy Faye | 2021 | 94th | 2 | 2 |
| The Power of the Dog | 2021 | 94th | 1 | 12 |
| Belfast | 2021 | 94th | 1 | 7 |
| West Side Story | 2021 | 94th | 1 | 7 |
| King Richard | 2021 | 94th | 1 | 6 |
| Drive My Car | 2021 | 94th | 1 | 4 |
| Encanto | 2021 | 94th | 1 | 3 |
| No Time to Die | 2021 | 94th | 1 | 3 |
| Cruella | 2021 | 94th | 1 | 2 |
| Summer of Soul (...Or, When the Revolution Could Not Be Televised) | 2021 | 94th | 1 | 1 |
| The Long Goodbye | 2020 | 94th | 1 | 1 |
| The Queen of Basketball | 2021 | 94th | 1 | 1 |
| The Windshield Wiper | 2021 | 94th | 1 | 1 |
| Don't Look Up | 2021 | 94th | 0 | 4 |
| Nightmare Alley | 2021 | 94th | 0 | 4 |
| Being the Ricardos | 2021 | 94th | 0 | 3 |
| Flee | 2021 | 94th | 0 | 3 |
| Licorice Pizza | 2021 | 94th | 0 | 3 |
| The Lost Daughter | 2021 | 94th | 0 | 3 |
| The Tragedy of Macbeth | 2021 | 94th | 0 | 3 |
| Parallel Mothers | 2021 | 94th | 0 | 2 |
| The Worst Person in the World | 2021 | 94th | 0 | 2 |
| Tick, Tick... Boom! | 2021 | 94th | 0 | 2 |
| Affairs of the Art | 2021 | 94th | 0 | 1 |
| Ala Kachuu – Take and Run | 2020 | 94th | 0 | 1 |
| Ascension | 2021 | 94th | 0 | 1 |
| Attica | 2021 | 94th | 0 | 1 |
| Audible | 2021 | 94th | 0 | 1 |
| Bestia | 2021 | 94th | 0 | 1 |
| Boxballet | 2021 | 94th | 0 | 1 |
| Coming 2 America | 2021 | 94th | 0 | 1 |
| Cyrano | 2021 | 94th | 0 | 1 |
| Four Good Days | 2021 | 94th | 0 | 1 |
| Free Guy | 2021 | 94th | 0 | 1 |
| House of Gucci | 2021 | 94th | 0 | 1 |
| Lead Me Home | 2021 | 94th | 0 | 1 |
| Luca | 2021 | 94th | 0 | 1 |
| Lunana: A Yak in the Classroom | 2019 | 94th | 0 | 1 |
| On My Mind | 2021 | 94th | 0 | 1 |
| Please Hold | 2020 | 94th | 0 | 1 |
| Raya and the Last Dragon | 2021 | 94th | 0 | 1 |
| Robin Robin | 2021 | 94th | 0 | 1 |
| Shang-Chi and the Legend of the Ten Rings | 2021 | 94th | 0 | 1 |
| Spencer | 2021 | 94th | 0 | 1 |
| Spider-Man: No Way Home | 2021 | 94th | 0 | 1 |
| The Dress | 2020 | 94th | 0 | 1 |
| The Hand of God | 2021 | 94th | 0 | 1 |
| The Mitchells vs. the Machines | 2021 | 94th | 0 | 1 |
| Three Songs for Benazir | 2021 | 94th | 0 | 1 |
| When We Were Bullies | 2021 | 94th | 0 | 1 |
| Writing with Fire | 2021 | 94th | 0 | 1 |
| **Everything Everywhere All at Once** | 2022 | 95th | 7 | 11 |
| All Quiet on the Western Front | 2022 | 95th | 4 | 9 |
| The Whale | 2022 | 95th | 2 | 3 |
| Top Gun: Maverick | 2022 | 95th | 1 | 6 |
| Black Panther: Wakanda Forever | 2022 | 95th | 1 | 5 |
| Avatar: The Way of Water | 2022 | 95th | 1 | 4 |
| Women Talking | 2022 | 95th | 1 | 2 |
| An Irish Goodbye | 2022 | 95th | 1 | 1 |
| Navalny | 2022 | 95th | 1 | 1 |
| Guillermo del Toro's Pinocchio | 2022 | 95th | 1 | 1 |
| RRR | 2022 | 95th | 1 | 1 |
| The Boy, the Mole, the Fox and the Horse | 2022 | 95th | 1 | 1 |
| The Elephant Whisperers | 2022 | 95th | 1 | 1 |
| The Banshees of Inisherin | 2022 | 95th | 0 | 9 |
| Elvis | 2022 | 95th | 0 | 8 |
| The Fabelmans | 2022 | 95th | 0 | 7 |
| Tár | 2022 | 95th | 0 | 6 |
| Babylon | 2022 | 95th | 0 | 3 |
| The Batman | 2022 | 95th | 0 | 3 |
| Triangle of Sadness | 2022 | 95th | 0 | 3 |
| Living | 2022 | 95th | 0 | 2 |
| A House Made of Splinters | 2022 | 95th | 0 | 1 |
| Aftersun | 2022 | 95th | 0 | 1 |
| All That Breathes | 2022 | 95th | 0 | 1 |
| All the Beauty and the Bloodshed | 2022 | 95th | 0 | 1 |
| An Ostrich Told Me the World Is Fake and I Think I Believe It | 2021 | 95th | 0 | 1 |
| Argentina, 1985 | 2022 | 95th | 0 | 1 |
| Bardo, False Chronicle of a Handful of Truths | 2022 | 95th | 0 | 1 |
| Blonde | 2022 | 95th | 0 | 1 |
| Causeway | 2022 | 95th | 0 | 1 |
| Close | 2022 | 95th | 0 | 1 |
| Empire of Light | 2022 | 95th | 0 | 1 |
| EO | 2022 | 95th | 0 | 1 |
| Fire of Love | 2022 | 95th | 0 | 1 |
| Glass Onion: A Knives Out Mystery | 2022 | 95th | 0 | 1 |
| Haulout | 2022 | 95th | 0 | 1 |
| How Do You Measure a Year? | 2021 | 95th | 0 | 1 |
| Ice Merchants | 2022 | 95th | 0 | 1 |
| Ivalu | 2023 | 95th | 0 | 1 |
| Le pupille | 2022 | 95th | 0 | 1 |
| Marcel the Shell with Shoes On | 2021 | 95th | 0 | 1 |
| Mrs. Harris Goes to Paris | 2022 | 95th | 0 | 1 |
| My Year of Dicks | 2022 | 95th | 0 | 1 |
| Night Ride | 2022 | 95th | 0 | 1 |
| Puss in Boots: The Last Wish | 2022 | 95th | 0 | 1 |
| Stranger at the Gate | 2022 | 95th | 0 | 1 |
| Tell It Like a Woman | 2022 | 95th | 0 | 1 |
| The Flying Sailor | 2022 | 95th | 0 | 1 |
| The Martha Mitchell Effect | 2022 | 95th | 0 | 1 |
| The Quiet Girl | 2022 | 95th | 0 | 1 |
| The Red Suitcase | 2022 | 95th | 0 | 1 |
| The Sea Beast | 2022 | 95th | 0 | 1 |
| To Leslie | 2022 | 95th | 0 | 1 |
| Turning Red | 2022 | 95th | 0 | 1 |
| **Oppenheimer** | 2023 | 96th | 7 | 13 |
| Poor Things | 2023 | 96th | 4 | 11 |
| The Zone of Interest | 2023 | 96th | 2 | 5 |
| Barbie | 2023 | 96th | 1 | 8 |
| American Fiction | 2023 | 96th | 1 | 5 |
| Anatomy of a Fall | 2023 | 96th | 1 | 5 |
| The Holdovers | 2023 | 96th | 1 | 5 |
| 20 Days in Mariupol | 2023 | 96th | 1 | 1 |
| Godzilla Minus One | 2023 | 96th | 1 | 1 |
| The Boy and the Heron | 2023 | 96th | 1 | 1 |
| The Last Repair Shop | 2023 | 96th | 1 | 1 |
| The Wonderful Story of Henry Sugar | 2023 | 96th | 1 | 1 |
| War Is Over! | 2022 | 96th | 1 | 1 |
| Killers of the Flower Moon | 2023 | 96th | 0 | 10 |
| Maestro | 2023 | 96th | 0 | 7 |
| Napoleon | 2023 | 96th | 0 | 3 |
| Mission: Impossible – Dead Reckoning Part One | 2023 | 96th | 0 | 2 |
| Nyad | 2023 | 96th | 0 | 2 |
| Past Lives | 2023 | 96th | 0 | 2 |
| Society of the Snow | 2023 | 96th | 0 | 2 |
| The Creator | 2023 | 96th | 0 | 2 |
| American Symphony | 2023 | 96th | 0 | 1 |
| Bobi Wine: The People's President | 2022 | 96th | 0 | 1 |
| El Conde | 2023 | 96th | 0 | 1 |
| Elemental | 2023 | 96th | 0 | 1 |
| Flamin' Hot | 2023 | 96th | 0 | 1 |
| Four Daughters | 2023 | 96th | 0 | 1 |
| Golda | 2023 | 96th | 0 | 1 |
| Guardians of the Galaxy Vol. 3 | 2023 | 96th | 0 | 1 |
| Indiana Jones and the Dial of Destiny | 2023 | 96th | 0 | 1 |
| Invincible | 2022 | 96th | 0 | 1 |
| Io capitano | 2023 | 96th | 0 | 1 |
| Island in Between | 2023 | 96th | 0 | 1 |
| Knight of Fortune | 2023 | 96th | 0 | 1 |
| Letter to a Pig | 2022 | 96th | 0 | 1 |
| May December | 2023 | 96th | 0 | 1 |
| Nǎi Nai & Wài Pó | 2023 | 96th | 0 | 1 |
| Nimona | 2023 | 96th | 0 | 1 |
| Ninety-Five Senses | 2023 | 96th | 0 | 1 |
| Our Uniform | 2023 | 96th | 0 | 1 |
| Pachyderme | 2022 | 96th | 0 | 1 |
| Perfect Days | 2023 | 96th | 0 | 1 |
| Red, White and Blue | 2023 | 96th | 0 | 1 |
| Robot Dreams | 2023 | 96th | 0 | 1 |
| Rustin | 2023 | 96th | 0 | 1 |
| Spider-Man: Across the Spider-Verse | 2023 | 96th | 0 | 1 |
| The ABCs of Book Banning | 2023 | 96th | 0 | 1 |
| The After | 2023 | 96th | 0 | 1 |
| The Barber of Little Rock | 2023 | 96th | 0 | 1 |
| The Color Purple | 2023 | 96th | 0 | 1 |
| The Eternal Memory | 2023 | 96th | 0 | 1 |
| The Teachers' Lounge | 2023 | 96th | 0 | 1 |
| To Kill a Tiger | 2022 | 96th | 0 | 1 |
| Emilia Pérez | 2024 | 97th | 2 | 13 |
| The Brutalist | 2024 | 97th | 3 | 10 |
| Wicked | 2024 | 97th | 2 | 10 |
| A Complete Unknown | 2024 | 97th | 0 | 8 |
| Conclave | 2024 | 97th | 1 | 8 |
| **Anora** | 2024 | 97th | 5 | 6 |
| Dune: Part Two | 2024 | 97th | 2 | 5 |
| The Substance | 2024 | 97th | 1 | 5 |
| Nosferatu | 2024 | 97th | 0 | 4 |
| I'm Still Here | 2024 | 97th | 1 | 3 |
| Sing Sing | 2023 | 97th | 0 | 3 |
| The Wild Robot | 2024 | 97th | 0 | 3 |
| A Real Pain | 2024 | 97th | 1 | 2 |
| Flow | 2024 | 97th | 1 | 2 |
| Nickel Boys | 2024 | 97th | 0 | 2 |
| The Apprentice | 2024 | 97th | 0 | 2 |
| A Different Man | 2024 | 97th | 0 | 1 |
| A Lien | 2023 | 97th | 0 | 1 |
| Alien: Romulus | 2024 | 97th | 0 | 1 |
| Anuja | 2024 | 97th | 0 | 1 |
| Beautiful Men | 2023 | 97th | 0 | 1 |
| Better Man | 2024 | 97th | 0 | 1 |
| Black Box Diaries | 2024 | 97th | 0 | 1 |
| Death by Numbers | 2024 | 97th | 0 | 1 |
| Elton John: Never Too Late | 2024 | 97th | 0 | 1 |
| Gladiator II | 2024 | 97th | 0 | 1 |
| I Am Ready, Warden | 2024 | 97th | 0 | 1 |
| I'm Not a Robot | 2023 | 97th | 1 | 1 |
| In the Shadow of the Cypress | 2023 | 97th | 1 | 1 |
| Incident | 2023 | 97th | 0 | 1 |
| Inside Out 2 | 2024 | 97th | 0 | 1 |
| Instruments of a Beating Heart | 2024 | 97th | 0 | 1 |
| Kingdom of the Planet of the Apes | 2024 | 97th | 0 | 1 |
| Magic Candies | 2024 | 97th | 0 | 1 |
| Maria | 2024 | 97th | 0 | 1 |
| Memoir of a Snail | 2024 | 97th | 0 | 1 |
| No Other Land | 2024 | 97th | 1 | 1 |
| Porcelain War | 2024 | 97th | 0 | 1 |
| September 5 | 2024 | 97th | 0 | 1 |
| Soundtrack to a Coup d'Etat | 2024 | 97th | 0 | 1 |
| Sugarcane | 2024 | 97th | 0 | 1 |
| The Girl with the Needle | 2024 | 97th | 0 | 1 |
| The Last Ranger | 2024 | 97th | 0 | 1 |
| The Man Who Could Not Remain Silent | 2024 | 97th | 0 | 1 |
| The Only Girl in the Orchestra | 2023 | 97th | 1 | 1 |
| The Seed of the Sacred Fig | 2024 | 97th | 0 | 1 |
| The Six Triple Eight | 2024 | 97th | 0 | 1 |
| Wallace & Gromit: Vengeance Most Fowl | 2024 | 97th | 0 | 1 |
| Wander to Wonder | 2023 | 97th | 0 | 1 |
| Yuck! | 2024 | 97th | 0 | 1 |
| **One Battle After Another** | 2025 | 98th | 6 | 13 |
| Sinners | 2025 | 98th | 4 | 16 |
| Frankenstein | 2025 | 98th | 3 | 9 |
| Marty Supreme | 2025 | 98th | 0 | 9 |
| Sentimental Value | 2025 | 98th | 1 | 9 |
| Hamnet | 2025 | 98th | 1 | 8 |
| Bugonia | 2025 | 98th | 0 | 4 |
| F1 | 2025 | 98th | 1 | 4 |
| The Secret Agent | 2025 | 98th | 0 | 4 |
| Train Dreams | 2025 | 98th | 0 | 4 |
| Avatar: Fire and Ash | 2025 | 98th | 1 | 2 |
| Blue Moon | 2025 | 98th | 0 | 2 |
| KPop Demon Hunters | 2025 | 98th | 2 | 2 |
| It Was Just an Accident | 2025 | 98th | 0 | 2 |
| Sirāt | 2025 | 98th | 0 | 2 |
| A Friend of Dorothy | 2025 | 98th | 0 | 1 |
| All the Empty Rooms | 2025 | 98th | 1 | 1 |
| Arco | 2025 | 98th | 0 | 1 |
| Armed Only with a Camera: The Life and Death of Brent Renaud | 2025 | 98th | 0 | 1 |
| Children No More: "Were and Are Gone" | 2025 | 98th | 0 | 1 |
| Come See Me in the Good Light | 2025 | 98th | 0 | 1 |
| Cutting Through Rocks | 2025 | 98th | 0 | 1 |
| Butcher's Stain | 2025 | 98th | 0 | 1 |
| Butterfly | 2025 | 98th | 0 | 1 |
| Diane Warren: Relentless | 2025 | 98th | 0 | 1 |
| Elio | 2025 | 98th | 0 | 1 |
| Forevergreen | 2025 | 98th | 0 | 1 |
| Jurassic World Rebirth | 2025 | 98th | 0 | 1 |
| Jane Austen's Period Drama | 2025 | 98th | 0 | 1 |
| If I Had Legs I'd Kick You | 2025 | 98th | 0 | 1 |
| Kokuho | 2025 | 98th | 0 | 1 |
| Little Amélie or the Character of Rain | 2025 | 98th | 0 | 1 |
| Mr. Nobody Against Putin | 2025 | 98th | 1 | 1 |
| Perfectly a Strangeness | 2025 | 98th | 0 | 1 |
| Retirement Plan | 2025 | 98th | 0 | 1 |
| Song Sung Blue | 2025 | 98th | 0 | 1 |
| The Alabama Solution | 2025 | 98th | 0 | 1 |
| The Devil Is Busy | 2025 | 98th | 0 | 1 |
| The Girl Who Cried Pearls | 2025 | 98th | 1 | 1 |
| The Lost Bus | 2025 | 98th | 0 | 1 |
| The Perfect Neighbor | 2025 | 98th | 0 | 1 |
| The Singers | 2025 | 98th | 1 | 1 |
| The Smashing Machine | 2025 | 98th | 0 | 1 |
| The Three Sisters | 2025 | 98th | 0 | 1 |
| The Ugly Stepsister | 2025 | 98th | 0 | 1 |
| The Voice of Hind Rajab | 2025 | 98th | 0 | 1 |
| Two People Exchanging Saliva | 2025 | 98th | 1 | 1 |
| Viva Verdi! | 2025 | 98th | 0 | 1 |
| Weapons | 2025 | 98th | 1 | 1 |
| Zootopia 2 | 2025 | 98th | 0 | 1 |

== Superlatives ==
- Films with the most awards: Ben-Hur (1959), Titanic (1997), and The Lord of the Rings: The Return of the King (2003) each earned 11 Academy Awards.
- Films with the most nominations: Sinners (2025) earned 16 nominations, surpassing previous record holders All About Eve (1950), Titanic (1997), and La La Land (2016), which each earned 14 Academy Award nominations.
- Film with the highest clean sweep: The Lord of the Rings: The Return of the King (2003) won all 11 Academy Awards from its 11 nominations.
- Films with the most nominations without a single win: The Turning Point (1977) and The Color Purple (1985) (11 nominations each)
- Film with the most awards without winning Best Picture: Cabaret (1972) won eight Academy Awards from its ten nominations. It lost Best Picture to The Godfather (1972).
- Film with the most nominations without being nominated for Best Picture: They Shoot Horses, Don't They? (1969) earned nine Academy Award nominations, including Best Director (Sydney Pollack), but was omitted from the top category. It won one award, for Best Supporting Actor (Gig Young).

== Multiple Year Nominees ==
There have been 19 films nominated or awarded Academy Awards in multiple years. The nominations and awards are divided by each ceremony instead of totaled together.

Multiyear Film List
| Film | Ceremonies | Awards | Nominations |
|---|---|---|---|
| Amarcord | 47th Academy Awards | 1 | 1 |
| Amarcord | 48th Academy Awards | 0 | 2 |
| Day for Night | 46th Academy Awards | 1 | 1 |
| Day for Night | 47th Academy Awards | 0 | 3 |
| Forbidden Games | 25th Academy Awards | 0 (1) | 0 |
| Forbidden Games | 27th Academy Awards | 0 | 1 |
| In Which We Serve | 15th Academy Awards | 0 (1) | 0 |
| In Which We Serve | 16th Academy Awards | 0 | 2 |
| Investigation of a Citizen Above Suspicion | 43rd Academy Awards | 1 | 1 |
| Investigation of a Citizen Above Suspicion | 44th Academy Awards | 0 | 1 |
| Marriage Italian Style | 37th Academy Awards | 0 | 1 |
| Marriage Italian Style | 38th Academy Awards | 0 | 1 |
| My Night at Maud's | 42nd Academy Awards | 0 | 1 |
| My Night at Maud's | 43rd Academy Awards | 0 | 1 |
| Rashomon | 24th Academy Awards | 0 (1) | 0 |
| Rashomon | 25th Academy Awards | 0 | 1 |
| Snow White and the Seven Dwarfs | 10th Academy Awards | 0 | 1 |
| Snow White and the Seven Dwarfs | 11th Academy Awards | 0 (1) | 0 |
| Street Angel | 1st Academy Awards | 1 | 1 |
| Street Angel | 2nd Academy Awards | 0 | 2 |
| Sundays and Cybele | 35th Academy Awards | 1 | 1 |
| Sundays and Cybele | 36th Academy Awards | 0 | 2 |
| The Battle of Algiers | 39th Academy Awards | 0 | 1 |
| The Battle of Algiers | 41st Academy Awards | 0 | 2 |
| The Emigrants | 44th Academy Awards | 0 | 1 |
| The Emigrants | 45th Academy Awards | 0 | 4 |
| The Four Days of Naples | 35th Academy Awards | 0 | 1 |
| The Four Days of Naples | 36th Academy Awards | 0 | 1 |
| The Quiet One | 21st Academy Awards | 0 | 1 |
| The Quiet One | 22nd Academy Awards | 0 | 1 |
| The Shop on Main Street | 38th Academy Awards | 1 | 1 |
| The Shop on Main Street | 39th Academy Awards | 0 | 1 |
| The Umbrellas of Cherbourg | 37th Academy Awards | 0 | 1 |
| The Umbrellas of Cherbourg | 38th Academy Awards | 0 | 4 |
| Through a Glass Darkly | 34th Academy Awards | 1 | 1 |
| Through a Glass Darkly | 35th Academy Awards | 0 | 1 |
| Woman in the Dunes | 37th Academy Awards | 0 | 1 |
| Woman in the Dunes | 38th Academy Awards | 0 | 1 |
