= 14th Academy Awards =

- Date: February 26, 1942
- Site: Biltmore Bowl, Biltmore Hotel, Los Angeles, California, USA
- Hosted by: Bob Hope

Highlights
- Best Picture: How Green Was My Valley
- Most awards: How Green Was My Valley (5)
- Most nominations: Sergeant York (11)

The 14th Academy Awards honored film achievements in 1941 and were held at the Biltmore Hotel in Los Angeles, California. The ceremony was briefly cancelled due to the Pearl Harbor attack on December 7, 1941.

The ceremony is now considered notable as the year in which Citizen Kane failed to win Best Picture, losing to John Ford's How Green Was My Valley. Later regarded as the greatest film ever made, Citizen Kane was nominated for nine awards but won only one, for Best Original Screenplay.

John Ford won his third Best Director award for How Green Was My Valley, becoming the second to do so (after Frank Capra), and the first to win the award in consecutive years (following The Grapes of Wrath in 1940).

Much public attention was focused on the Best Actress race between sibling rivals Joan Fontaine, for Alfred Hitchcock’s Suspicion, and Olivia de Havilland, for Hold Back the Dawn. Fontaine won, becoming the only acting winner from a film directed by Hitchcock.

The Little Foxes set a record by receiving nine nominations without winning a single Oscar; this mark was matched by Peyton Place in 1957, and exceeded by The Turning Point and The Color Purple, both of which received 11 nominations without a win.

== Winners and nominees ==
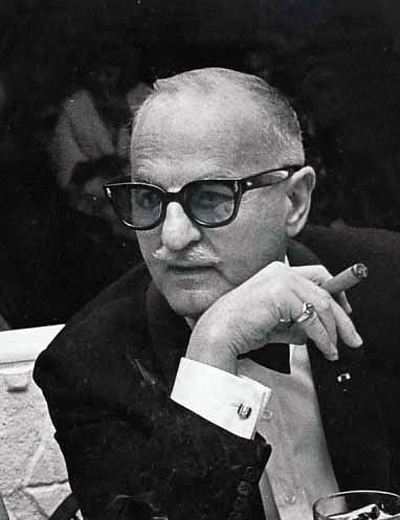
Darryl F. Zanuck; Best Picture winner

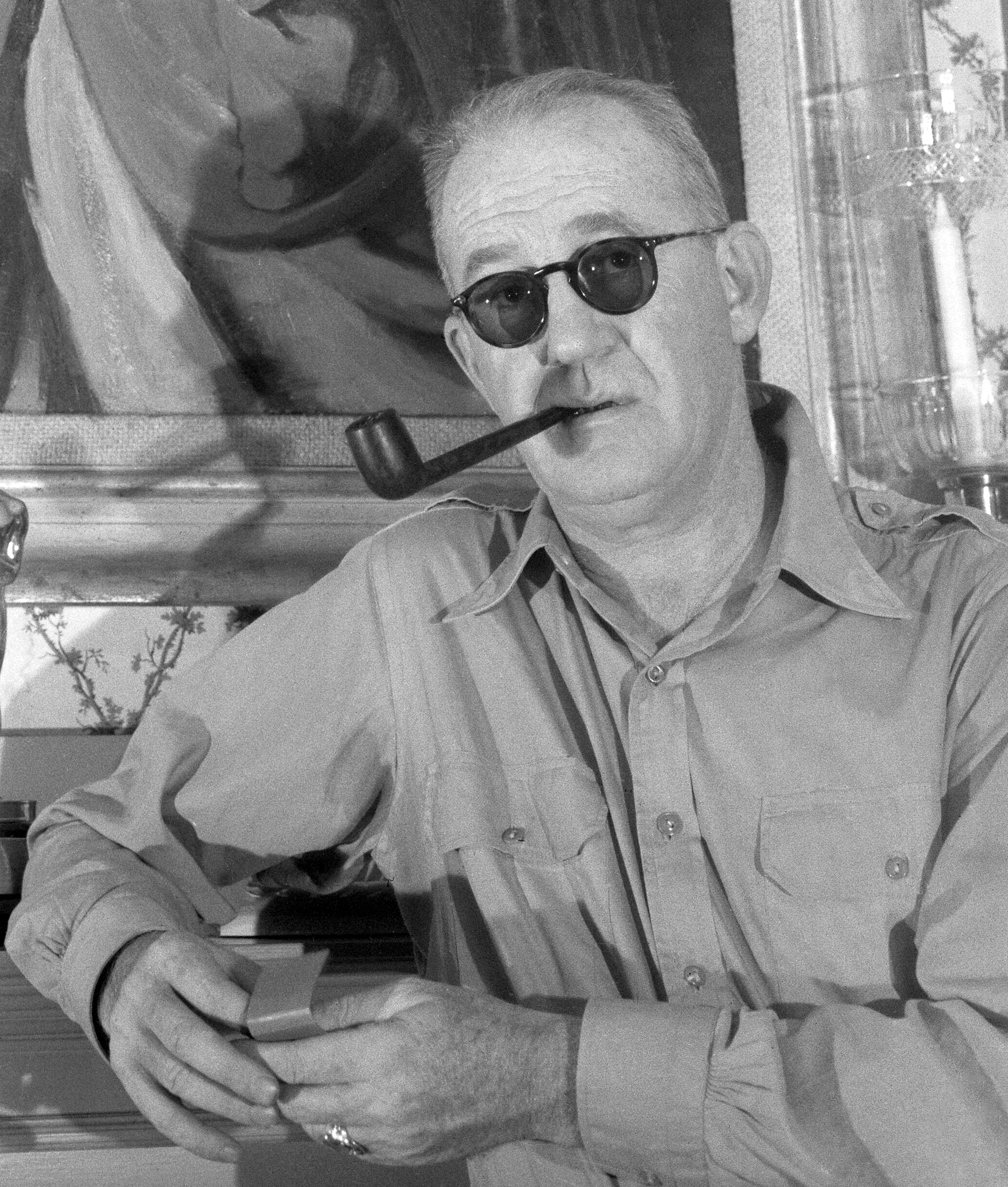
John Ford; Best Director winner

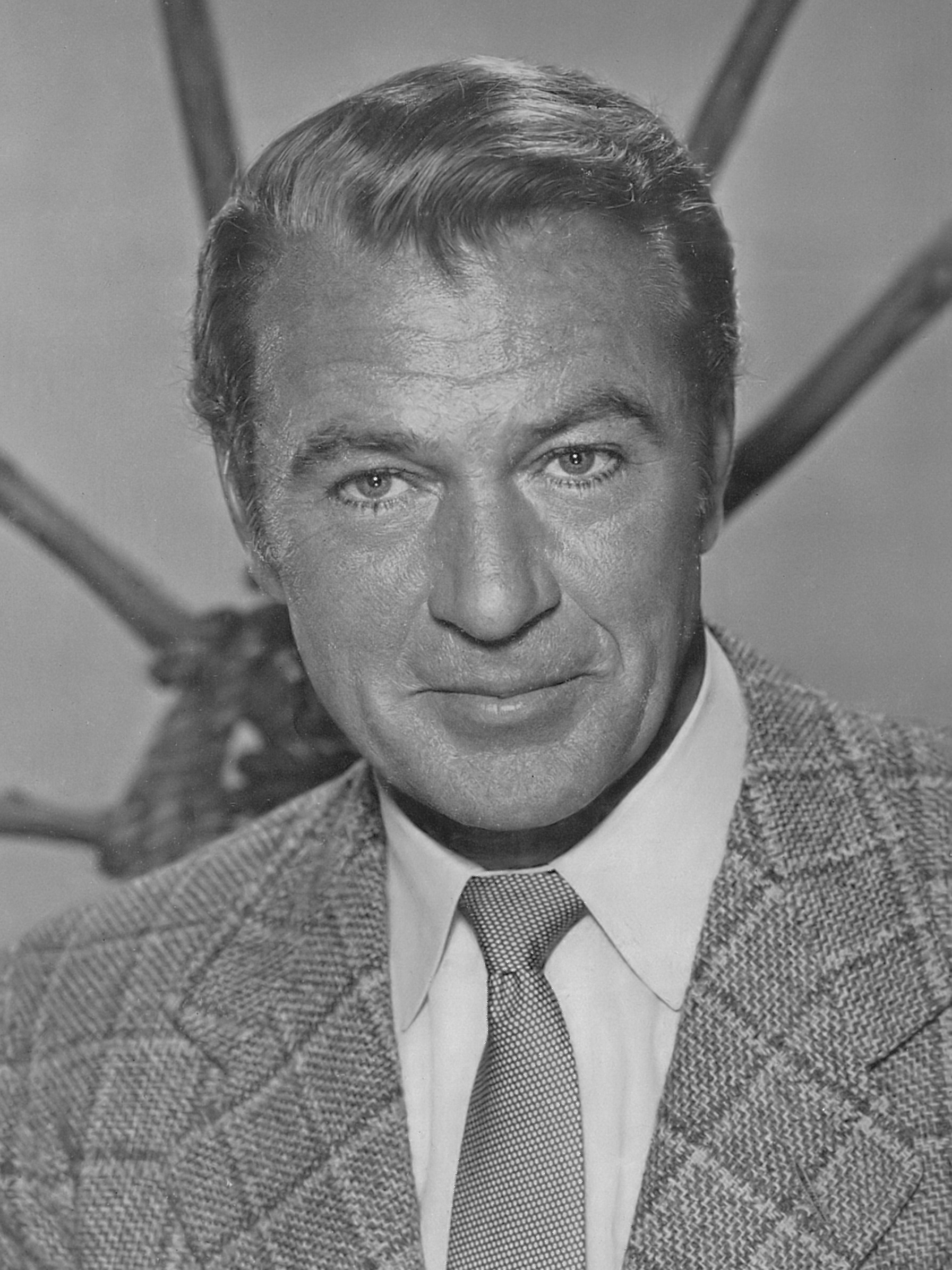
Gary Cooper; Best Actor winner

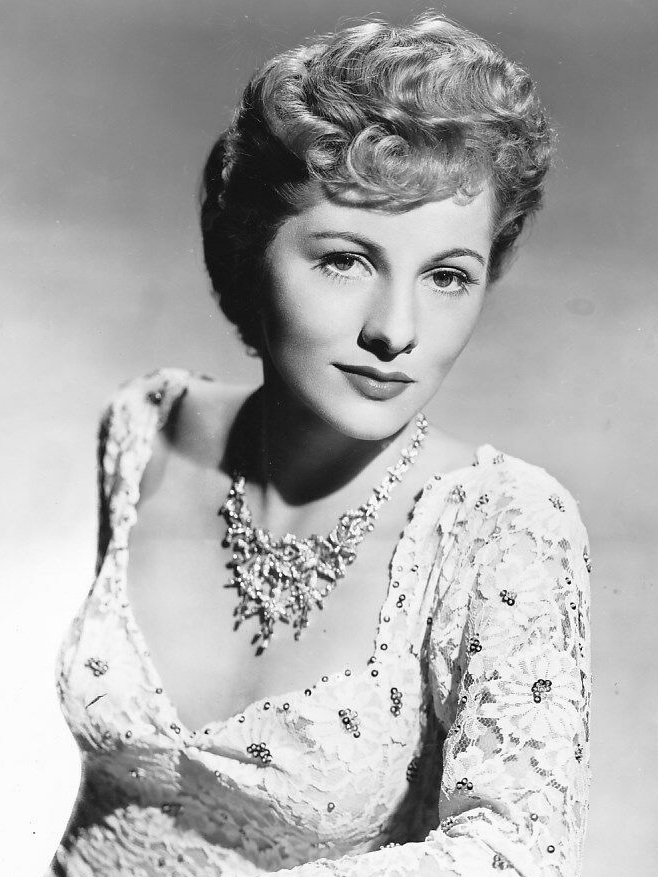
Joan Fontaine; Best Actress winner

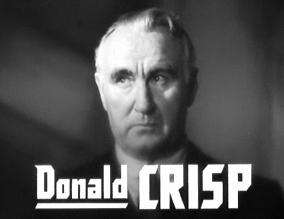
Donald Crisp; Best Supporting Actor winner

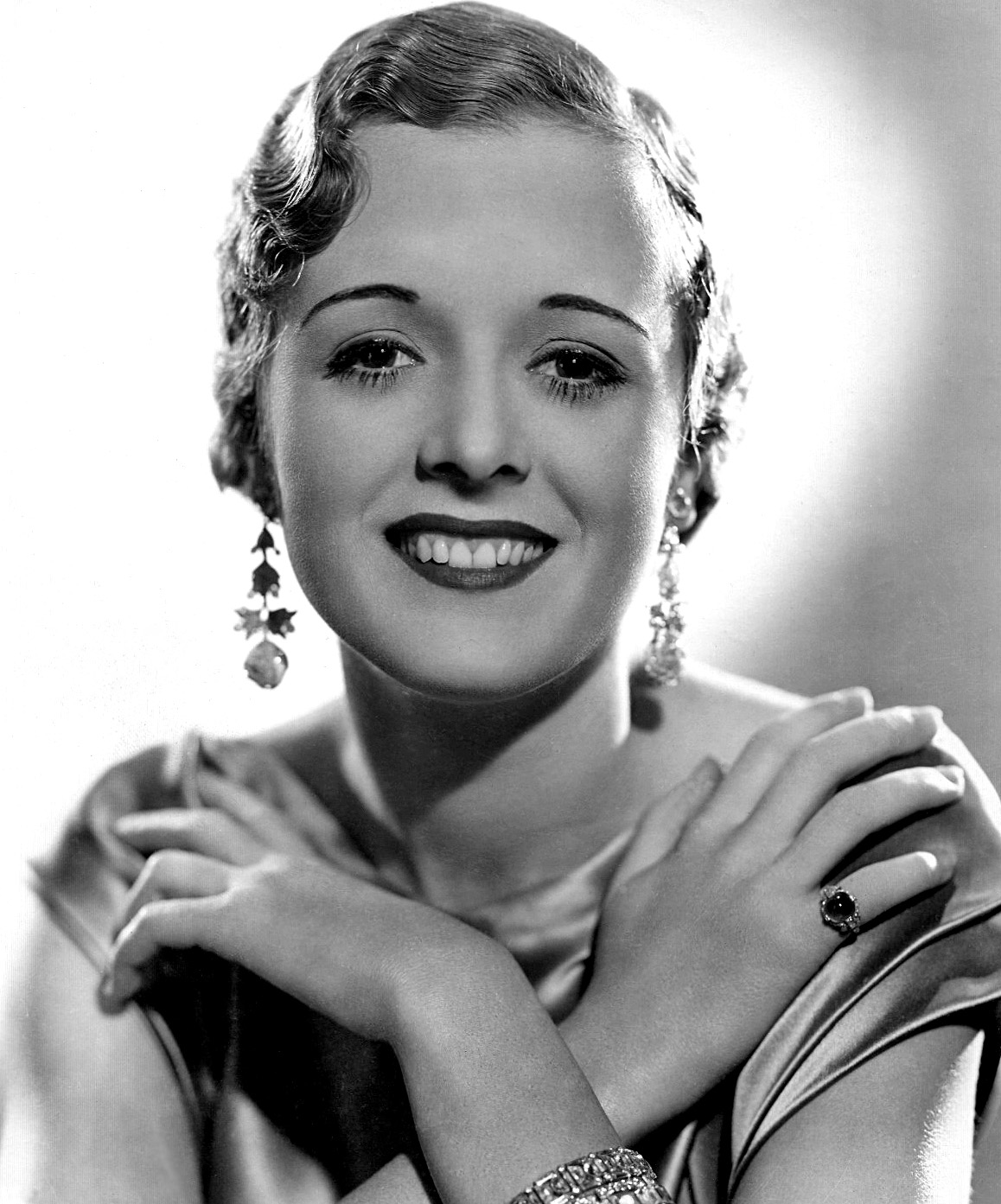
Mary Astor; Best Supporting Actress winner

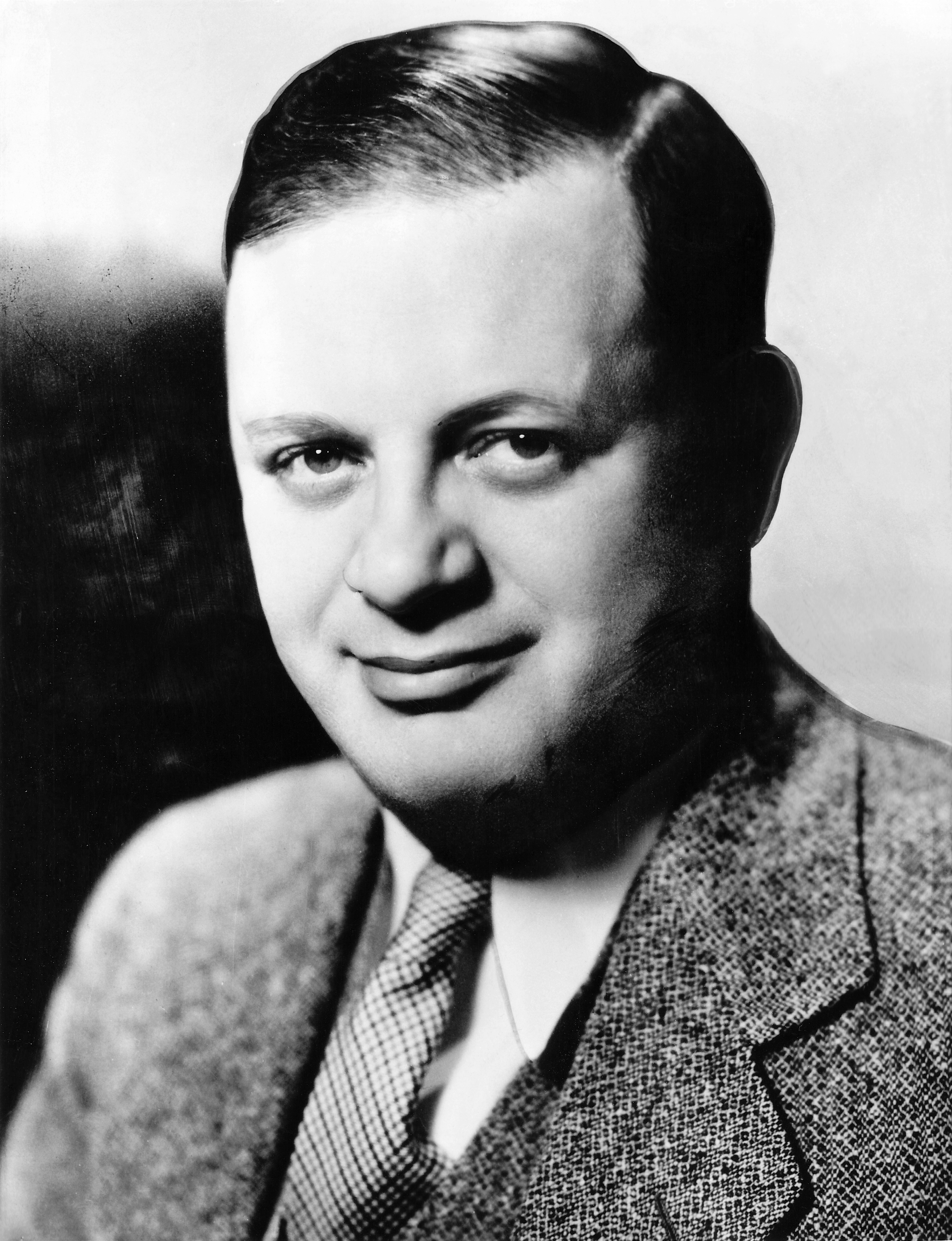
Herman J. Mankiewicz; Best Original Screenplay co-winner

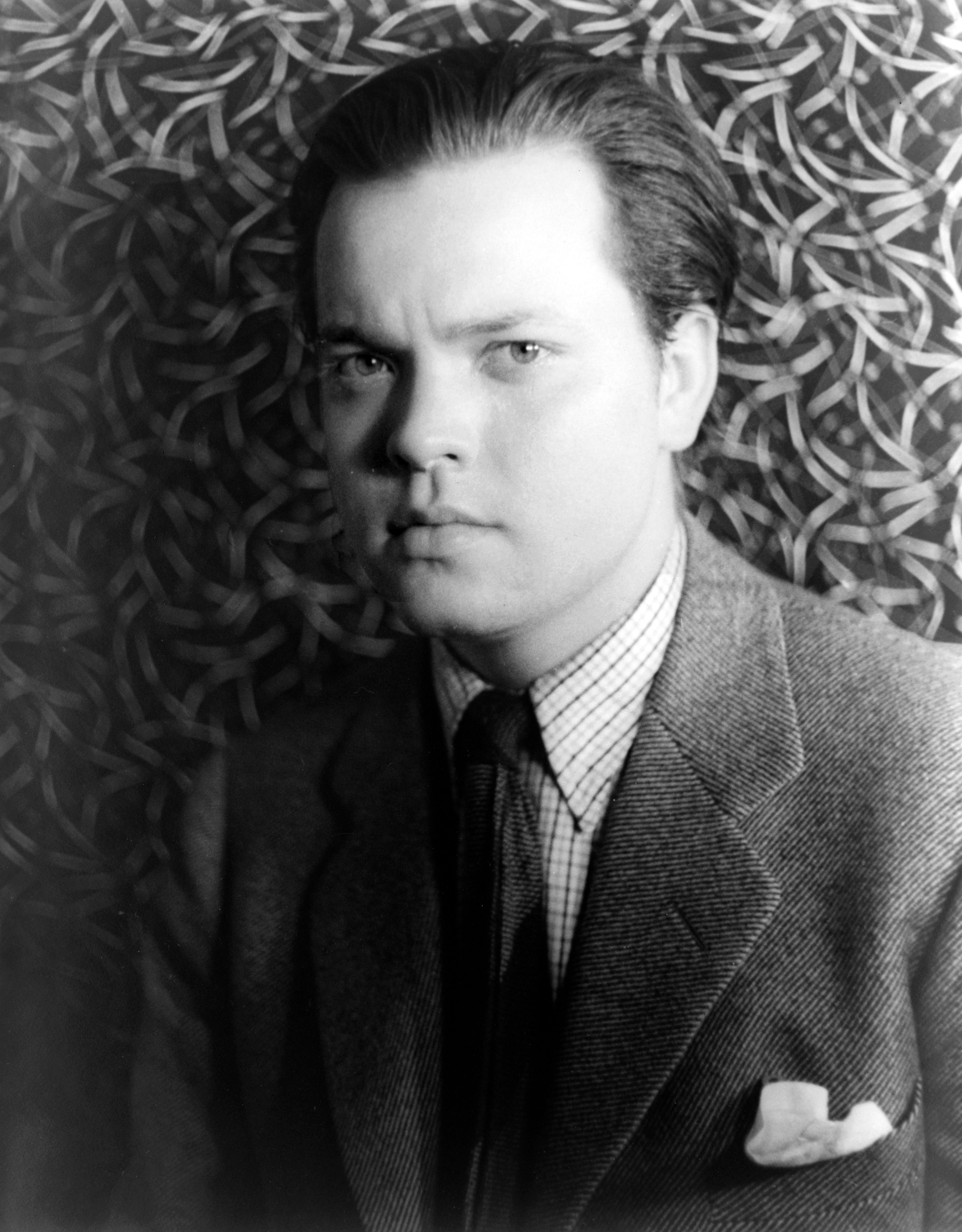
Orson Welles; Best Original Screenplay co-winner

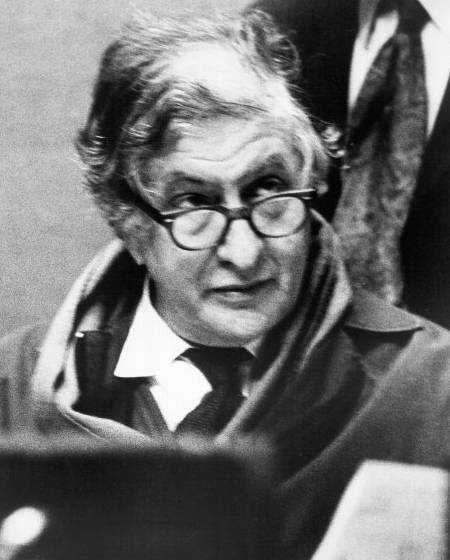
Bernard Herrmann; Best Original Score winner

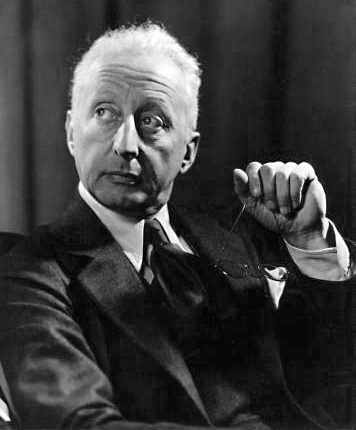
Jerome Kern; Best Original Song co-winner

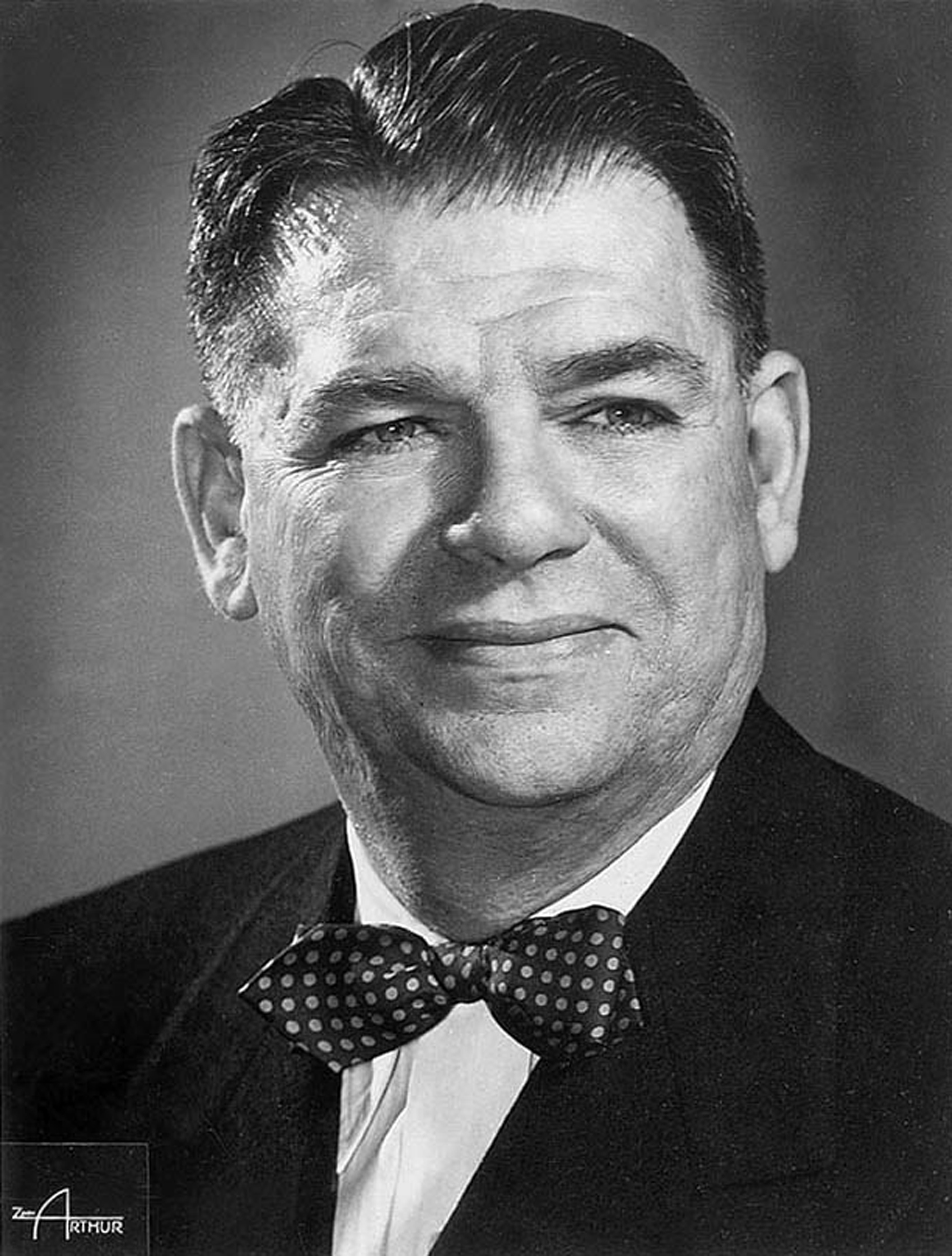
Oscar Hammerstein II; Best Original Song co-winner

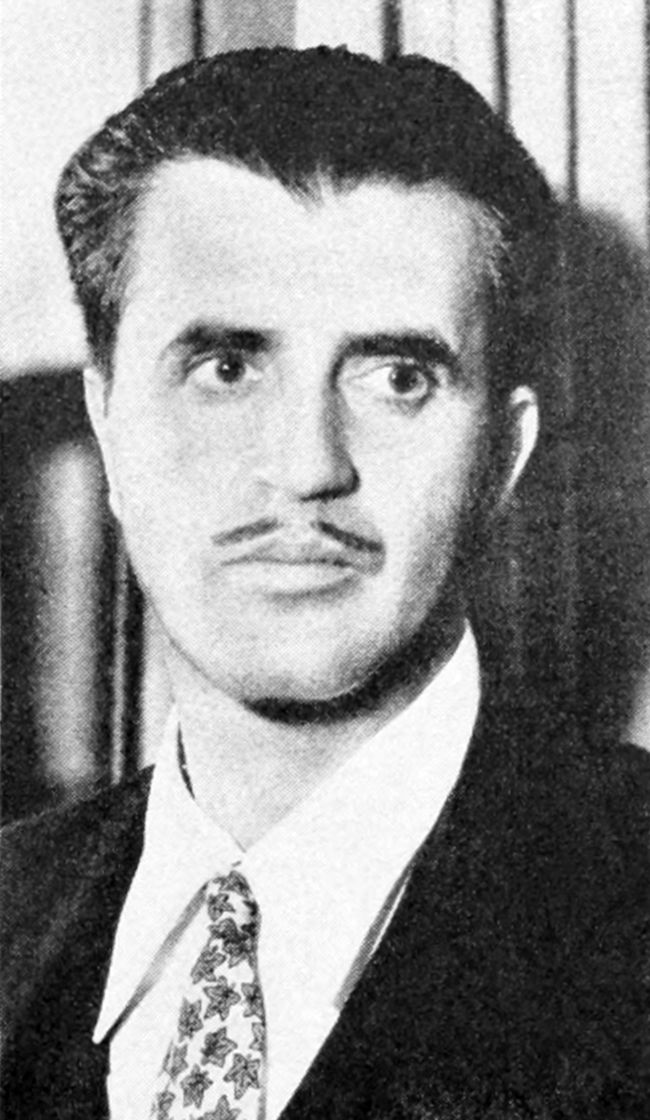
Cedric Gibbons; Best Art Direction, Color co-winner

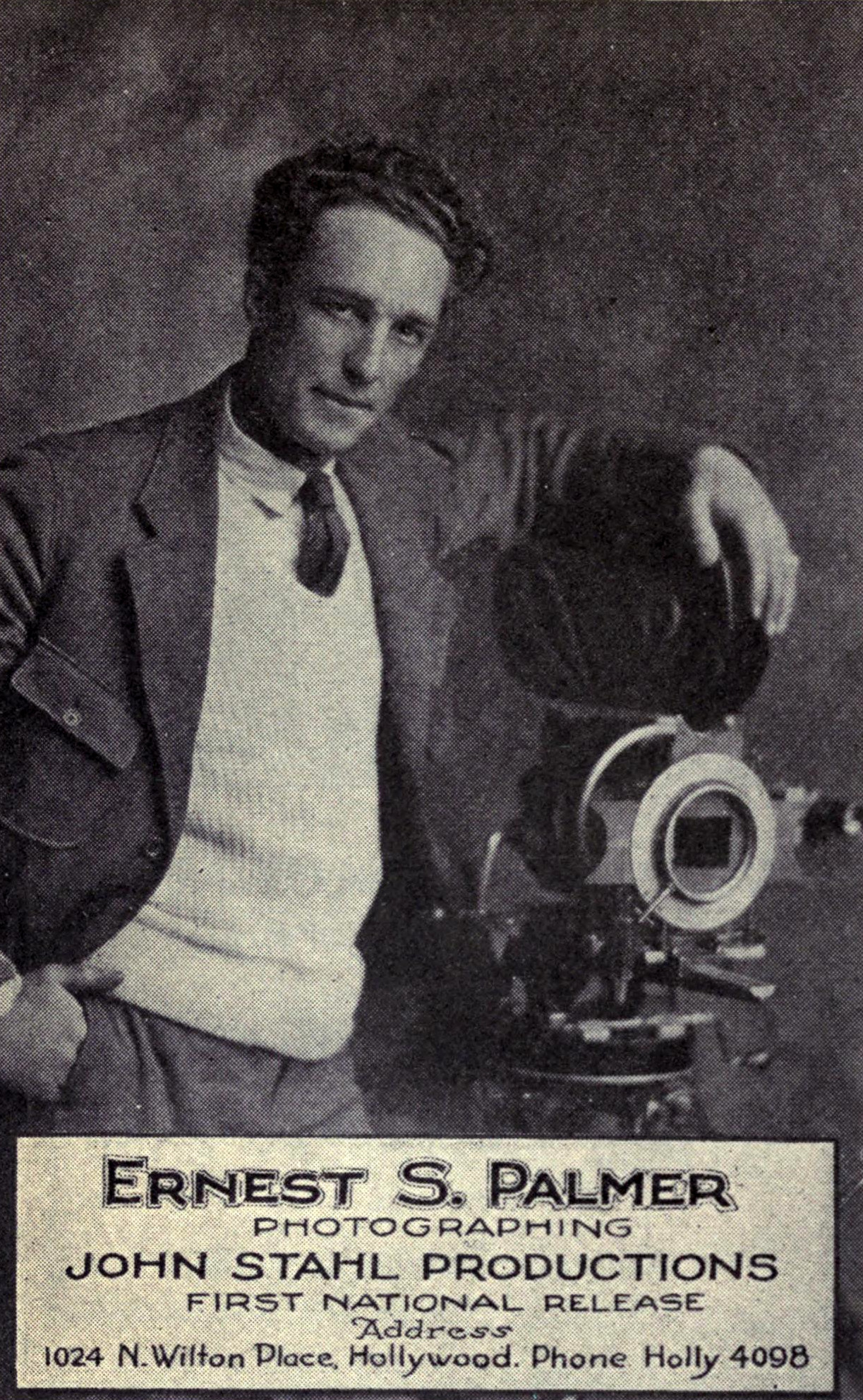
Ernest Palmer; Best Cinematography, Color co-winner

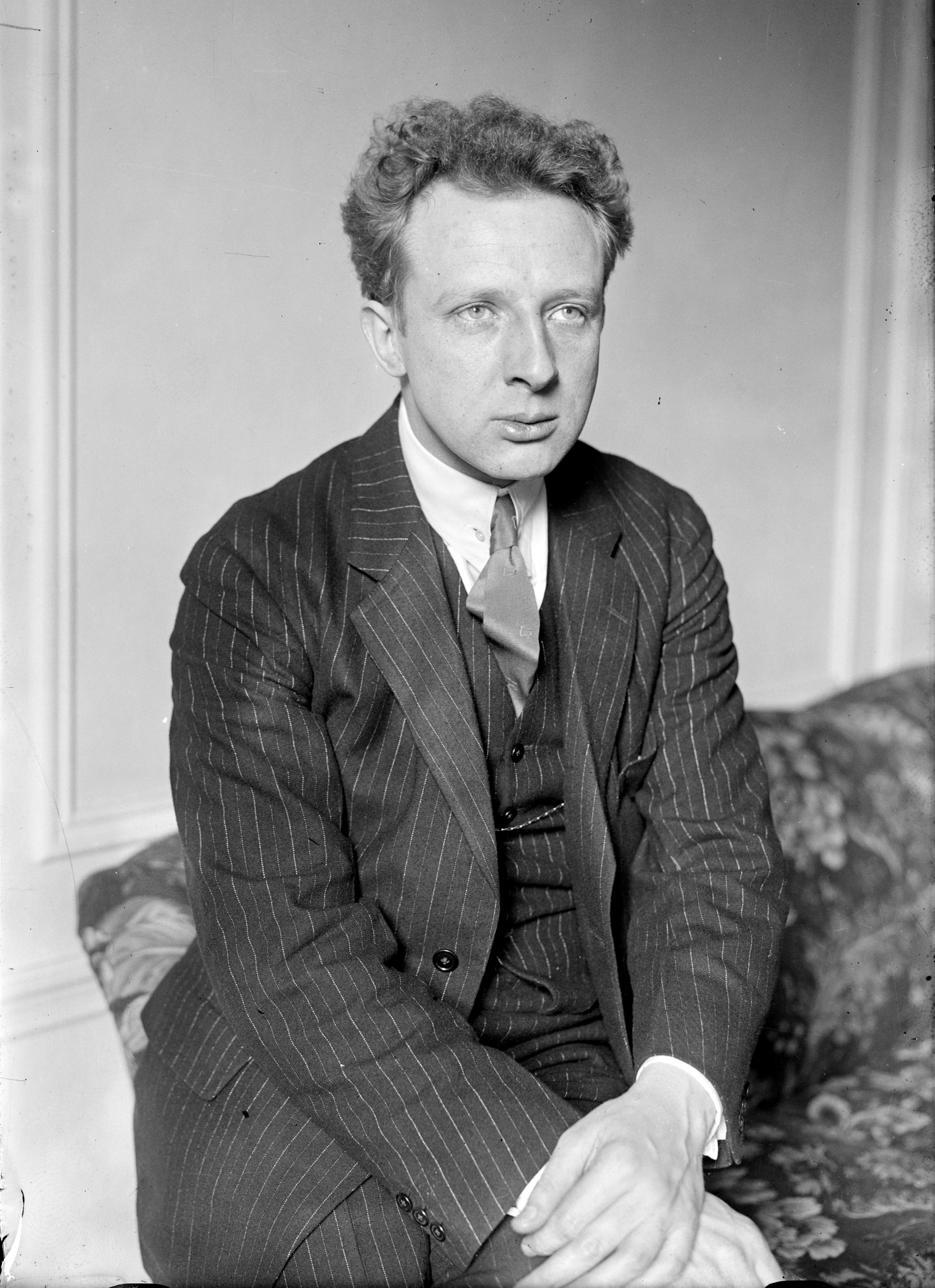
Leopold Stokowski; Honorary Academy Award recipient

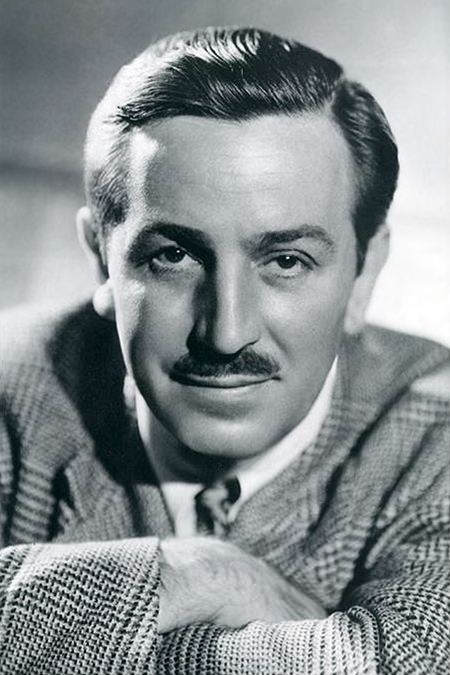
Walt Disney; Honorary Academy Award and Irving G. Thalberg Memorial Award recipient

=== Awards ===
Nominations were announced on February 6, 1942. Winners are listed first and highlighted in boldface.

**Outstanding Motion Picture**: **How Green Was My Valley** **– Darryl F. Zanuck for 20th Century Fox**; Blossoms in the Dust – Irving Asher for Metro-Goldwyn-Mayer; Citizen Kane – Orson Welles for RKO Radio; Here Comes Mr. Jordan – Everett Riskin for Columbia; Hold Back the Dawn – Arthur Hornblow Jr. for Paramount; The Little Foxes – Samuel Goldwyn for RKO Radio; The Maltese Falcon – Hal B. Wallis for Warner Bros.; One Foot in Heaven – Hal B. Wallis for Warner Bros.; Sergeant York – Hal B. Wallis and Jesse L. Lasky for Warner Bros.; Suspicion – Alfred Hitchcock for RKO Radio	**Best Directing**: **John Ford – How Green Was My Valley**; Orson Welles – Citizen Kane; Alexander Hall – Here Comes Mr. Jordan; William Wyler – The Little Foxes; Howard Hawks – Sergeant York
**Best Actor**: **Gary Cooper – Sergeant York as Alvin C. York**; Cary Grant – Penny Serenade as Roger Adams; Walter Huston – All That Money Can Buy as Mr Scratch; Robert Montgomery – Here Comes Mr. Jordan as Joe Pendleton; Orson Welles – Citizen Kane as Charles Foster Kane	**Best Actress**: **Joan Fontaine – Suspicion as Lina McLaidlaw Aysgarth**; Bette Davis – The Little Foxes as Regina Hubbard Giddens; Olivia de Havilland – Hold Back the Dawn as Emmy Brown; Greer Garson – Blossoms in the Dust as Edna Kahly Gladney; Barbara Stanwyck – Ball of Fire as Katherine "Sugarpuss" O'Shea
**Best Actor in a Supporting Role**: **Donald Crisp – How Green Was My Valley as Gwilym Morgan**; Walter Brennan – Sergeant York as Pastor Rosier Pile; Charles Coburn – The Devil and Miss Jones as John P. Merrick; James Gleason – Here Comes Mr. Jordan as Max "Pop" Corkle; Sydney Greenstreet – The Maltese Falcon as Kasper Gutman	**Best Actress in a Supporting Role**: **Mary Astor – The Great Lie as Sandra Kovak**; Sara Allgood – How Green Was My Valley as Mrs Beth Morgan; Patricia Collinge – The Little Foxes as Birdie Hubbard; Teresa Wright – The Little Foxes as Alexandra Giddens; Margaret Wycherly – Sergeant York as Mary Brooks York
**Best Writing (Original Story)**: **Here Comes Mr. Jordan – Harry Segall**; Ball of Fire – Billy Wilder and Thomas Monroe; The Lady Eve – Monckton Hoffe; Meet John Doe – Richard Connell and Robert Presnell Sr.; Night Train to Munich – Gordon Wellesley	**Best Writing (Original Screenplay)**: **Citizen Kane – Herman J. Mankiewicz and Orson Welles**; The Devil and Miss Jones – Norman Krasna; Sergeant York – John Huston, Howard Koch, Abem Finkel, and Harry Chandlee; Tall, Dark and Handsome – Karl Tunberg and Darrell Ware; Tom, Dick and Harry – Paul Jarrico
**Best Writing (Screenplay)**: **Here Comes Mr. Jordan – Sidney Buchman and Seton I. Miller, based on the play Heaven Can Wait by Harry Segall**; Hold Back the Dawn – Charles Brackett and Billy Wilder, based on "Memo to a Movie Producer" by Ketti Frings; How Green Was My Valley – Philip Dunne, based on the novel by Richard Llewellyn; The Little Foxes – Lillian Hellman, based on the play by Lillian Hellman; The Maltese Falcon – John Huston, based on the novel by Dashiell Hammett	**Best Documentary (Short Subject)**: **Churchill's Island – National Film Board of Canada and United Artists**; Adventure in the Bronx – Film Associates; Bomber: A Defense Report on Film – U.S. Office for Emergency Management Film Unit and Motion Picture Committee Cooperating for National Defense; Christmas Under Fire – British Ministry of Information and Warner Bros.; A Letter from Home – British Ministry of Information and United Artists; Life of a Thoroughbred – Truman Talley and 20th Century Fox; Norway in Revolt – The March of Time and RKO Radio; A Place to Live – Philadelphia Housing Authority and Philadelphia Housing Association; Russian Soil – Amkino; Soldiers of the Sky – Truman Talley and 20th Century Fox; War Clouds in the Pacific – National Film Board of Canada and MGM
**Best Short Subject (One-Reel)**: **Of Pups and Puzzles – MGM**; Army Champions – Pete Smith and MGM; Beauty and the Beach – Paramount; Down on the Farm – Paramount; Forty Boys and a Song – Warner Bros.; Kings of the Turf – Warner Bros.; Sagebrush and Silver – 20th Century Fox	**Best Short Subject (Two-Reel)**: **Main Street on the March! – Metro-Goldwyn-Mayer**; Alive in the Deep – Woodard Productions, Inc.; Forbidden Passage – Metro-Goldwyn-Mayer; The Gay Parisian – Warner Bros.; The Tanks Are Coming – U.S. Army and Warner Bros.
**Best Short Subject (Cartoon)**: **Lend a Paw – Walt Disney Productions and RKO Radio**; Boogie Woogie Bugle Boy of Company B – Walter Lantz Productions and Universal; Hiawatha's Rabbit Hunt – Leon Schlesinger and Warner Bros.; How War Came – Columbia; The Night Before Christmas – MGM; Rhapsody in Rivets – Leon Schlesinger and Warner Bros.; Rhythm in the Ranks – George Pal Productions and Paramount; The Rookie Bear – MGM; Superman – Fleischer Studios and Paramount; Truant Officer Donald – Walt Disney Productions and RKO Radio	**Best Music (Music Score of a Dramatic Picture)**: **All That Money Can Buy – Bernard Herrmann**; Back Street – Frank Skinner; Ball of Fire – Alfred Newman; Cheers for Miss Bishop – Edward Ward; Citizen Kane – Bernard Herrmann; Dr. Jekyll and Mr. Hyde – Franz Waxman; Hold Back the Dawn – Victor Young; How Green Was My Valley – Alfred Newman; King of the Zombies – Edward J. Kay; Ladies in Retirement – Morris Stoloff and Ernst Toch; The Little Foxes – Meredith Willson; Lydia – Miklós Rózsa; Mercy Island – Cy Feuer and Walter Scharf; Sergeant York – Max Steiner; So Ends Our Night – Louis Gruenberg; Sundown – Miklós Rózsa; Suspicion – Franz Waxman; Tanks a Million – Edward Ward; That Uncertain Feeling – Werner R. Heymann; This Woman is Mine – Richard Hageman
**Best Music (Scoring of a Musical Picture)**: **Dumbo – Frank Churchill and Oliver Wallace**; All-American Co-Ed – Edward Ward; Birth of the Blues – Robert Emmett Dolan; Buck Privates – Charles Previn; The Chocolate Soldier – Herbert Stothart and Bronisław Kaper; Ice-Capades – Cy Feuer; The Strawberry Blonde – Heinz Roemheld; Sun Valley Serenade – Emil Newman; Sunny – Anthony Collins; You'll Never Get Rich – Morris Stoloff	**Best Music (Song)**: **"The Last Time I Saw Paris" from Lady Be Good – Music by Jerome Kern; Lyrics by Oscar Hammerstein II**; "Baby Mine" from Dumbo – Music by Frank Churchill; Lyrics by Ned Washington; "Be Honest With Me" from Ridin' on a Rainbow – Music and Lyrics by Gene Autry and Fred Rose; "Blues in the Night" from Blues in the Night – Music by Harold Arlen; Lyrics by Johnny Mercer; "Boogie Woogie Bugle Boy of Company B" from Buck Privates – Music by Hugh Prince; Lyrics by Don Raye; "Chattanooga Choo Choo" from Sun Valley Serenade – Music by Harry Warren; Lyrics by Mack Gordon; "Dolores" from Las Vegas Nights – Music by Louis Alter; Lyrics by Frank Loesser; "Out of the Silence" from All-American Co-ed – Music and Lyrics by Lloyd B. Norlin; "Since I Kissed My Baby Goodbye" from You'll Never Get Rich – Music and Lyrics by Cole Porter
**Best Sound Recording**: **That Hamilton Woman – Jack Whitney**; Appointment for Love – Bernard B. Brown; Ball of Fire – Thomas T. Moulton; The Chocolate Soldier – Douglas Shearer; Citizen Kane – John O. Aalberg; The Devil Pays Off – Charles L. Lootens; How Green Was My Valley – E. H. Hansen; The Men in Her Life – John P. Livadary; Sergeant York – Nathan Levinson; Skylark – Loren L. Ryder; Topper Returns – Elmer Raguse	**Best Art Direction (Black-and-White)**: **How Green Was My Valley – Art Direction: Richard Day and Nathan H. Juran; Interior Decoration: Thomas Little**; Citizen Kane – Art Direction: Perry Ferguson and Van Nest Polglase; Interior Decoration: Al Fields and Darrell Silvera; The Flame of New Orleans – Art Direction: Martin Obzina and Jack Otterson; Interior Decoration: Russell A. Gausman; Hold Back the Dawn – Art Direction: Hans Dreier and Robert Usher; Interior Decoration: Samuel M. Comer; Ladies in Retirement – Art Direction: Lionel Banks; Interior Decoration: George Montgomery; The Little Foxes – Art Direction: Stephen Goosson; Interior Decoration: Howard Bristol; Sergeant York – Art Direction: John Hughes; Interior Decoration: Fred M. MacLean; The Son of Monte Cristo – Art Direction: John DuCasse Schulze; Interior Decoration: Edward G. Boyle; Sundown – Art Direction: Alexander Golitzen; Interior Decoration: Richard Irvine; That Hamilton Woman – Art Direction: Vincent Korda; Interior Decoration: Julia Heron; When Ladies Meet – Art Direction: Cedric Gibbons and Randall Duell; Interior Decoration: Edwin B. Willis; ~~Sis Hopkins – N/A~~ (nomination withdrawn by production company)
**Best Art Direction (Color)**: **Blossoms in the Dust – Art Direction: Cedric Gibbons and Urie McCleary; Interior Decoration: Edwin B. Willis**; Blood and Sand – Art Direction: Richard Day and Joseph C. Wright; Interior Decoration: Thomas Little; Louisiana Purchase – Art Direction: Raoul Pene Du Bois; Interior Decoration: Stephen Seymour	**Best Cinematography (Black-and-White)**: **How Green Was My Valley – Arthur Miller**; The Chocolate Soldier – Karl Freund; Citizen Kane – Gregg Toland; Dr. Jekyll and Mr. Hyde – Joseph Ruttenberg; Here Comes Mr. Jordan – Joseph Walker; Hold Back the Dawn – Leo Tover; Sergeant York – Sol Polito; Sun Valley Serenade – Edward Cronjager; Sundown – Charles Lang; That Hamilton Woman – Rudolph Maté
**Best Cinematography (Color)**: **Blood and Sand – Ernest Palmer and Ray Rennahan**; Aloma of the South Seas – Wilfred M. Cline, Karl Struss, and William Snyder; Billy the Kid – William V. Skall and Leonard Smith; Blossoms in the Dust – Karl Freund and W. Howard Greene; Dive Bomber – Bert Glennon; Louisiana Purchase – Harry Hallenberger and Ray Rennahan	**Best Film Editing**: **Sergeant York – William Holmes**; Citizen Kane – Robert Wise; Dr. Jekyll and Mr. Hyde – Harold F. Kress; How Green Was My Valley – James B. Clark; The Little Foxes – Daniel Mandell
**Best Special Effects**: **I Wanted Wings – Photographic Effects Farciot Edouart and Gordon Jennings; Sound Effects: Louis Mesenkop**; Aloma of the South Seas – Photographic Effects: Farciot Edouart and Gordon Jennings; Sound Effects: Louis Mesenkop; Flight Command – Photographic Effects: A. Arnold Gillespie; Sound Effects: Douglas Shearer; The Invisible Woman – Photographic Effects: John P. Fulton; Sound Effects: John Hall; The Sea Wolf – Photographic Effects: Byron Haskin; Sound Effects: Nathan Levinson; That Hamilton Woman – Photographic Effects: Lawrence W. Butler; Sound Effects: William H. Wilmarth; Topper Returns – Photographic Effects: Roy Seawright; Sound Effects: Elmer Raguse; A Yank in the R.A.F. – Photographic Effects: Fred Sersen; Sound Effects: Edmund H. Hansen; ~~Dive Bomber – Photographic Effects: Byron Haskin; Sound Effects: Nathan Levinson~~ (replaced)

=== Special awards ===
- To Rey Scott for his extraordinary achievement in producing Kukan, the film record of China's struggle, including its photography with a 16mm camera under the most difficult and dangerous conditions.
- To The British Ministry of Information for its vivid and dramatic presentation of the heroism of the RAF in the documentary film, Target for Tonight.
- To Leopold Stokowski and his associates for their unique achievement in the creation of a new form of visualized music in Walt Disney's production, Fantasia, thereby widening the scope of the motion picture as entertainment and as an art form.
- To Walt Disney, William Garity, John N. A. Hawkins and the RCA Manufacturing Company for their outstanding contribution to the advancement of the use of sound in motion pictures through the production of Fantasia.

=== Irving G. Thalberg Memorial Award ===
- Walt Disney

== Multiple nominations and awards ==
Films with multiple nominations
Nominations	Film
11	Sergeant York
10	How Green Was My Valley
9	Citizen Kane
9	The Little Foxes
7	Here Comes Mr. Jordan
6	Hold Back the Dawn
4	Ball of Fire
4	Blossoms in the Dust
4	That Hamilton Woman
3	The Chocolate Soldier
3	Dr. Jekyll and Mr. Hyde
3	The Maltese Falcon
3	Sun Valley Serenade
3	Sundown
3	Suspicion
2	All-American Co-Ed
2	All That Money Can Buy
2	Aloma of the South Seas
2	Blood and Sand
2	Buck Privates
2	The Devil and Miss Jones
2	Dumbo
2	Ladies in Retirement
2	Louisiana Purchase
2	Topper Returns
2	You'll Never Get Rich

Films with multiple awards (Note: Not counting the two non-competitive Special Awards for Fantasia.)
Awards	Film
5	How Green Was My Valley
2	Here Comes Mr. Jordan
2	Sergeant York

== Ceremony information ==
This year marked the debut of the Academy Award for Best Documentary Feature as Special Awards. From the next ceremony it will be awarded competitively each year, with the exception of 1946.

Judy Garland sang the unofficial national anthem of the United States at the time, "My Country 'Tis of Thee".

Bette Davis had sought to open the ceremony to the public for the benefit of the American Red Cross, but was turned down and she ended up resigning from her post as President of AMPAS over this.

A portion of the ceremony was broadcast by CBS Radio.

== See also ==
- 1941 in film
