= Jackie Coogan filmography =

Filmography

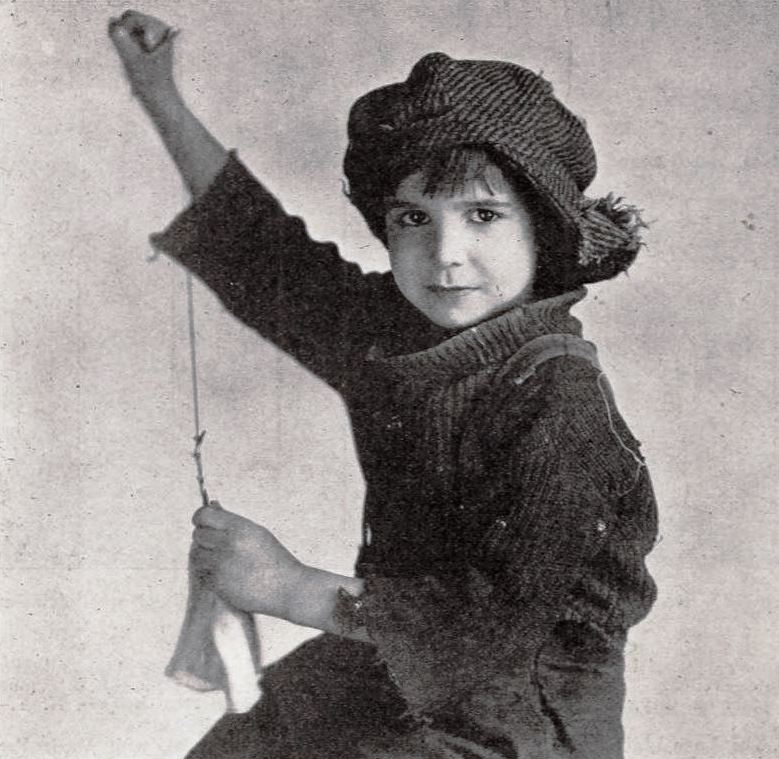
Coogan in 1922

Jackie Coogan was an American actor whose career spanned decades, and included numerous feature films and television series. The child of vaudeville performers, Coogan began his career as a child actor, and had his first major role in Charlie Chaplin's The Kid (1921). He went on to appear in numerous films throughout his childhood and adolescence, and had a career as a television actor in his later life, appearing as Uncle Fester on The Addams Family (1964–1966), as well as numerous other guest-starring roles. Coogan's final film credit was the slasher film The Prey (1984), which was filmed several years prior and released shortly after his death in 1984.

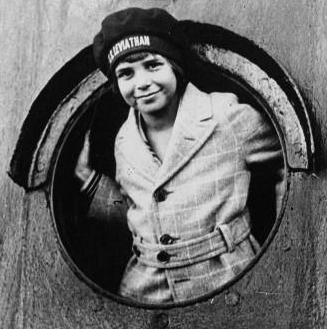
Coogan aboard the Leviathan

== Film ==
Year	Title	Role	Notes	Ref.
1917	Skinner's Baby	The Baby	Uncredited; Lost film	
1919	A Day's Pleasure	Smallest Boy	Uncredited	
1921	The Kid	The Kid		
1921	Peck's Bad Boy	Henry Peck AKA 'Peck's Bad Boy'		
1921	My Boy	Jackie Blair		
1922	Nice and Friendly	Boy		
1922	Trouble	Danny, the Kid		
1922	Oliver Twist	Oliver Twist		
1923	Daddy	Jackie Savelli / Jackie Holden		
1923	Circus Days	Toby Tyler		
1923	Long Live the King	Crown Prince Ferdinand William Otto		
1924	A Boy of Flanders	Nello		
1924	Hello, 'Frisco	Himself		
1924	Little Robinson Crusoe	Mickey Hogan		
1925	The Rag Man	Tim Kelly		
1925	Old Clothes	Timothy Kelly		
1927	Johnny Get Your Hair Cut	Johnny O'Day		
1927	The Bugle Call	Billy Randolph	Lost film	
1927	Buttons	Buttons	Lost film	
1930	Free and Easy	Jackie Coogan - at Premiere	Uncredited	
1930	Tom Sawyer	Tom Sawyer		
1931	Huckleberry Finn	Tom Sawyer		
1935	Home on the Range	Jack Hatfield		
1938	College Swing	Jackie		
1939	Million Dollar Legs	Russ Simpson		
1939	Sky Patrol	Carter Meade		
1942	Queen of Broadway			
1947	Kilroy Was Here	Pappy Collins	Monogram Pictures Corporation film	
1948	French Leave	Pappy Reagan		
1951	Skipalong Rosenbloom	Buck Lovelace		
1951	Varieties on Parade	Himself		
1952	Outlaw Women	Paiute Bill		
1953	Mesa of Lost Women	Dr. Aranya		
1953	The Actress	Inopportune	Uncredited	
1955	Escape from Terror	Agent Petrov		
1956	The Proud Ones	Man on Make	Uncredited	
1957	The Buster Keaton Story	Elmer Case		
1957	The Joker Is Wild	Swifty Morgan		
1957	Eighteen and Anxious	Harold 'Eager' Beaver		
1958	Lonelyhearts	Ned Gates		
1958	High School Confidential!	Mr. 'Mr. A' August		
1958	The Space Children	Hank Johnson		
1958	No Place to Land	Swede		
1959	Night of the Quarter Moon	Desk Sergeant Bragan		
1959	The Beat Generation	Jake Baron		
1959	The Big Operator	Ed Brannell		
1960	Sex Kittens Go to College	Wildcat MacPherson		
1962	When the Girls Take Over	Captain Toussaint		
1965	John Goldfarb, Please Come Home!	Father Ryan		
1965	Girl Happy	Sergeant Benson		
1966	A Fine Madness	Mr. Fitzgerald		
1966	Clown Alley	Clown	Television film	
1968	The Shakiest Gun in the West	Matthew Basch		
1968	Rogue's Gallery	Funeral Director		
1969	Marlowe	Grant W. Hicks		
1973	Cahill U.S. Marshal	Charlie		
1974	The Phantom of Hollywood	Jonathan		
1975	Lucy Gets Lucky	Gus Mitchell	Television film	
1975	The Manchu Eagle Murder Caper Mystery	Detective Chief Anderson		
1975	The Specialists	Roger	Television film	
1976	Won Ton Ton, the Dog Who Saved Hollywood	Stagehand 1		
1976	Sherlock Holmes in New York	Haymarket Hotel Proprietor	Television film	
1977	Halloween with the New Addams Family	Uncle Fester	Television film	
1979	Human Experiments	Sheriff Tibbs		
1980	Dr. Heckyl and Mr. Hype	Sergeant Fleacollar		
1980	The Kids Who Knew Too Much	Mr. Klein	Television film	
1982	The Escape Artist	Magic Shop Owner		
1983	The Prey	Lester Tile	Filmed c. 1980; final film role	

== Television ==
Year	Title	Role	Notes	Ref.
1952	Racket Squad	Pennington	Episode: "The Christmas Caper"	
1952–1953	Cowboy G-Men	Stoney Crockett	39 episodes	
1955	Damon Runyon Theater	O'Keefe	Episode: "Honorary Degree"	
1955–1957	Climax!	Various	3 episodes	
1956–1957	Playhouse 90	Various	4 episodes	
1957	The People's Choice	Salesman	Episode: "Boomerang"	
1957–1970	The Red Skelton Hour	Various	20 episodes	
1959	Peter Gunn	Eric Woolrich	Episode: "Keep Smiling"	
1959	Alfred Hitchcock Presents	George Bay	Season 5 Episode 6: "Anniversary Gift"	
1959	Hawaiian Eye	Mack Stanley	Episode: "Dangerous Eden"	
1959	The Loretta Young Show	Snuff Carter / Woody Woods	2 episodes	
1959–1960	General Electric Theater	Various	2 episodes	
1960	The Adventures of Ozzie and Harriet	Ed Wilson	Episode: "An Interesting Evening"	
1960	The Ann Sothern Show	Barney Dunaway	2 episodes	
1960	Mr. Lucky	Joe Azevedo	Episode: "Dangerous Lady"	
1960	Lock-Up	Pinky Winthrop	Episode: "Society Doctor"	
1960	Klondike	First Mate	Episode: "Halliday's Club"	
1960	The Tab Hunter Show		Episode: "I Love a Marine"	
1960–1961	Shirley Temple's Storybook	Sam Brady / Marshal Rogers	2 episodes	
1960–1962	Outlaws	Ed Durant / Corbett	2 episodes	
1961	The Best of the Post	Sid	Episode: "Martha"	
1961	The Americans	Rowe	Episode: "The Coward"	
1961	Holiday Lodge	Harvey Silk	Episode: "Never Hit a Stranger"	
1961	The Andy Griffith Show	George Stevens	Episode: "Barney on the Rebound"	
1961–1966	Perry Mason	Various	4 episodes	
1962	Follow the Sun	Lew Dobber	Episode: "A Choice of Weapons"	
1962	The Joey Bishop Show	Dave Arnold	Episode: "A Show of His Own"	
1962–1963	McKeever and the Colonel	Sergeant Barnes	26 episodes	
1963	The Dick Powell Theater	Shopkeeper	Episode: "Thunder in a Forgotten Town"	
1963–1968	The Lucy Show	Mr. Burton / Lieutenant Ruggles	2 episodes	
1964–1966	The Addams Family	Uncle Fester	64 episodes	
1964	Bob Hope Presents the Chrysler Theatre	Customer	Episode: "Her School of Bachelors"	
1966	Vacation Playhouse	Finnigan	Episode: "The Hoofer"	
1966	The Virginian	Bodey	Episode: "Trail to Ashley Mountain"	
1967	Family Affair	Tim Callahan	Episode: "Fat, Fat, the Water Rat"	
1967	The Wild Wild West	Sheriff Koster	Episode: "The Night of the Cut-Throats"	
1968	The Outsider	Rusty	Episode: "Tell It Like It Is... and You're Dead"	
1969	I Dream of Jeannie	Suleiman	2 episodes	
1969–1973	Hawaii Five-O	Frank / Jerry Howe / Horace Sibley	3 episodes	
1970	Matt Lincoln	Tait	Episode: "Nick"	
1970	Barefoot in the Park	Walding	Episode: "Disorder in the Court"	
1970	The Name of the Game	Connie Hart / Harry Winslow	2 episodes	
1970	Julia	The Mailman	Episode: "Essay, Can You See?"	
1970–1972	Love, American Style	Various	3 episodes	
1970–1973	The Partridge Family	Grandpa Walter Renfrew / Max Pepper	2 episodes	
1971–1974	McMillan & Wife	Howard Sparks / Lowball	3 episodes	
1971–1974	Ironside	Sam McGoff / Buster Logan	2 episodes	
1971–1972	Alias Smith and Jones	Passenger Agent / Harvey Clifford / Crawford	3 episodes	
1971–1972	The Brady Bunch	Harry Duggan / Man	2 episodes	
1971	The New Andy Griffith Show		Episode: "Nearly Nuptials for Nora"	
1971	The Jimmy Stewart Show	Officer Gadboy	Episode: "Guest of Honor"	
1972	Owen Marshall, Counselor at Law	Zigler	Episode: "Shine a Light on Me"	
1972	Adam-12	Harry Rustin	Episode: "The Adoption"	
1972	The New Scooby-Doo Movies	Uncle Fester	Voice, Episode: "Wednesday Is Missing"	
1972	Emergency!	Junkyard Owner	Episode: "Trainee"	
1973	Marcus Welby, M.D.	Vince Darrell	Episode: "The Problem with Charlie"	
1973	The Brian Keith Show	Mr. Plimpton	Episode: "Sean's Midas Touch"	
1973	Jigsaw	Harry	Episode: "Kiss the Dream Goodbye"	
1973	Here's Lucy	Kermit Bosworth	Episode: "Lucy's Tenant"	
1973	Barnaby Jones	Phil Rooney	Episode: "Sing a Song of Murder"	
1973	The Addams Family	Uncle Fester	Voice, 16 episodes	
1974	Gunsmoke	Stoudenaire	Episode: "The Guns of Cibola Blanca: Part 1"	
1974	Dirty Sally	Sheriff	Episode: "The Hanging of Cyrus Pike"	
1975	Police Story	Delaney	Episode: "The Witness"	
1975	McCoy	Skippy	Episode: "Double Take"	
1976	Movin' On	Sam Prichard	Episode: "The Big Switch"	
1977	Lanigan's Rabbi	R.B. Haig	Episode: "Say It Ain't So, Chief"	

== Sources ==
- Cary, Diana Serra (2004). Jackie Coogan: The World's Boy King: A Biography of Hollywood's Legendary Child Star. Lanham, Maryland: Scarecrow Press. ISBN 978-0-585-46687-3.
