= Stephen Seymour (disambiguation) =

Stephen Seymour is a set decorator.

Stephen, Steven or Steve Seymour may also refer to:

- Steven Seymour, see 2010 in poetry
- Steve Seymour, athlete
- Steve Seymour (basketball)
