= Johnny Long (musician) =

American violinist and bandleader (1914–1972)

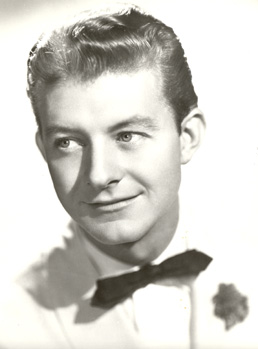
- Long in 1945
- Born: September 12, 1914; Newell, North Carolina
- Died: October 31, 1972 (aged 58); Parkersburg, West Virginia
- Other name: "The Man Who's Long on Music"
- Occupations: Bandleader, violinist, composer
- Spouse: Patricia Power-Waters (m. April 1943 - 1972; his death)
- Parents: Curtis W. Long; Connie Gardner Long

Johnny Long (September 12, 1914 (disputed) – October 31, 1972) was an American violinist and bandleader, known as "The Man Who's Long on Music".

== Early life ==
Johnny Long was born on September 12, 1914 (although this is disputed by many sources) in Newell, North Carolina to Curtis W. Long and Connie Gardner Long. At the age of six, while living on his parent's farm, he started practicing the violin, but injured two fingers on his left hand when he was bitten by one of their pigs. He then learned to use his right hand to play the violin, which became his distinctive playing style.

== Career ==
As a freshman at Duke University, Long initially pursued studies in business administration but eventually changed to music as his career. During his studies at university, Long immersed himself in the college's music scene. Long eventually joined with ten other freshmen to create a school band named "The Duke Collegians". During their second year, they were adopted as the official school band, playing at campus dances, athletic events, and student gatherings which laid the groundwork for Long's future career as a bandleader. The band stayed together throughout college and, upon graduation, renamed themselves "The Johnny Long Orchestra", with Long as the bandleader. For a number of years they toured the country and were eventually signed on to Vocalion Records (owned by ARC) in 1937, releasing the single Just Like That. The band performed their first national radio broadcast in 1939 on The Fitch Summer Bandwagon Show, which became a huge success. This eventually led to Long's band getting signed to the Decca Records label. His orchestra earned the title "Miracle Band of the Year" through a series of lengthy engagements across the country. In 1940, Long released the hit single, "In a Shanty in Old Shanty Town", which was awarded a gold disc by the RIAA. The song quickly became the band's signature tune.

Johnny Long accompanied singers such as Ella Fitzgerald on the song "(I'm Confessin') That I Love You". Long also performed "Back Up the Red, White and Blue with God," the official song of the Treasury's War Bond Department, at Franklin D. Roosevelt's birthday ball in Washington in 1941.

Long released the hit single, "In a Shanty in Old Shanty Town". It was awarded a gold disc by the RIAA. This song quickly became the band's signature tune. This song, and numerous other hits, made the band one of the most successful big bands in the country during the 1940s. Other popular covers included "My Dreams Are Getting Better All the Time" and "Poor Butterfly".

As well as his career primarily as a conductor/bandleader, Long also starred in several motion pictures, mostly providing the orchestral accompaniment to songs such as Hit the Ice in 1943 and the 1941 short film Beauty and the Beach, where he performed five swing numbers such as "Kiss the Boys Goodbye" with vocals by Helen Young.

== Personal life ==
Long eventually settled in Bayside, a neighborhood in Queens, New York. In 1943, he married Patricia Power-Waters, a former Powers and Conover model. The couple had no children.

== Death ==
Long died from a heart attack on October 31, 1972 at the age of 58. He was buried in King’s Church cemetery (formerly Newell Baptist Church) in Charlotte, North Carolina.

== Discography ==
- A Merry Christmas (1947, with Ray Bloch and Monica Lewis, Signature Records)
- Johnny Long's All Time Hits (1951, Aviance Records)
- Plays for Saturday Night Dance Date (1957, Tops Records)
- One Night Stand with Johnny Long at the Meadowlark (1984, Joyce Records)
- Going Somewhere (1985, Starlight Theatre Records)
- Shantytown (1967, Sunset Records)
