= I Was an Adventuress =

- Theatrical release poster
- Directed by: Gregory Ratoff
- Screenplay by: Karl Tunberg; Don Ettlinger; John O'Hara
- Based on: J'étais une aventurière 1938 French film by Jacques Companéez; Herbert Juttke; Hans Jacoby; Michel Duran
- Produced by: Nunnally Johnson
- Starring: Vera Zorina; Richard Greene; Erich von Stroheim; Peter Lorre
- Cinematography: Leon Shamroy; Edward Cronjager
- Edited by: Francis D. Lyon
- Music by: David Buttolph
- Distributed by: Twentieth Century Fox Film Corporation
- Release date: May 10, 1940
- Running time: 81 min
- Country: United States
- Language: English

I Was an Adventuress is a 1940 American drama film directed by Gregory Ratoff, starring Vera Zorina, Richard Greene, Erich von Stroheim, and Peter Lorre. An actress/ballerina works as decoy for two international con artists.

== Plot ==
Countess Tanya Vronsky acts as bait for notorious jewel thief Andre Desormeaux and his assistant, Polo, on their tour through Europe. Everything goes according to plan until Tanya falls in love with their next target, Paul Vernay. Still, the gang manages to victimize Paul. After the heist, Tanya announces that she is retiring and goes on to marry Paul. Desormeaux tries to convince her to change her mind, but in vain.

They meet again months later in Paris, and Desormeaux makes another attempt at persuading the countess to work with them again. In order to get rid of them for good, she pretends to go along with their plans, but instead sets them up to make them think she has been arrested.

However, her plan is thwarted, and her two accomplices come to her home during a party and pretend to be guests. They manage to steal the guests' jewels and escape. Before they leave, Desormeaux blackmails Tanya, threatening to tell Paul about her past if he does not get 200,000 francs.

The theft is soon discovered, and Paul and Tanya go after the thieves in their car. On the way, Paul learns about Tanya's background and forgives her. While they are away, Polo returns to their house in a sudden change of heart, and gives back the jewels. Meanwhile, Desormeaux is boarding a ship to America.

Paul and Tanya come back and discover that the jewels have been returned. They forgive Polo. Tanya entertains her guests at the Vernay mansion by performing a dance from the ballet Swan Lake.

Polo then boards the ship, pretending to still have the jewels in a briefcase. He then "accidentally" drops the suitcase in the water.

== Cast ==
- Vera Zorina as Countess Tanya Vronsky (as Zorina)
- Richard Greene as Paul Vernay
- Erich von Stroheim as Andre Desormeaux (as Erich Von Stroheim)
- Peter Lorre as Polo
- Sig Ruman as Herr Protz (as Sig Rumann)
- Fritz Feld as Henri Gautier
- Cora Witherspoon as Aunt Cecile
- Anthony Kemble-Cooper as Cousin Emil (as Anthony Kemple Cooper)
- Paul Porcasi as Fisherman
- Inez Palange as Fisherman's Wife
- Egon Brecher as Jacques Dubois
- Roger Imhof as Henrich Von Kongen
- Rolfe Sedan as Waiter
- Eddie Conrad as Waiter
- Fortunio Bonanova as Orchestra Leader
- George Balanchine as Ballet Dancer
- Lew Christensen as Ballet Dancer
- Phyllis Barry as Englishwoman at Exhibit
- Charles Laskey as Ballet Dancer
- Ellinor Vanderveer as Englishwoman at Exhibit

== Production ==
The twelve-minute ballet sequence of Swan Lake was the longest ballet scene to appear in any film to date. For the scene, a $15,000 (equivalent to $300,000 in 2025) all-glass set, the first of its kind, was built using 40,000 square feet (3,700 m^{2}) of 1/4-inch (6 mm) plate glass.
