= Harry Hallenberger =

American cinematographer

- Born: October 24, 1877; Illinois, USA
- Died: March 4, 1954 (aged 76); Butte, California, USA
- Occupation: Cinematographer
- Years active: 1921-1947

Harry Hallenberger (October 24, 1877 – March 4, 1954) was an American cinematographer who was nominated at the 14th Academy Awards for Best Cinematography-Color, along with Ray Rennahan. This was for the film Louisiana Purchase.

== Filmography as cinematographer ==
(He also was a camera operator on other films.)

=== Feature-length films ===
- Pirates of Monterey (1947)
- The Virginian (1946)
- Riding High (1943)
- Louisiana Purchase (1941)
- Arizona (1940)
- Night Work (1939)
- El Trovador de la radio (1938)
- Forlorn River (1937)
- Redskin (1929) (uncredited)
- Special Delivery (1927)
- In Hollywood with Potash and Perlmutter (1924)
- Peck's Bad Boy (1921)

=== Shorts ===
- College Queen (1946)
- Movieland Magic (1946)
- Golden Slippers (1946)
- A Tale of Two Cafes (1946)
- Boogie Woogie (1945)
- Isle of Tabu (1945)
- You Hit the Spot (1945)
- Bonnie Lassie (1944)
- Star Bright (1944)
- Mardi Gras (1943)
- Women at War (1943)
