= Women at War =

1943 American short film

- Directed by: Jean Negulesco
- Written by: Charles L. Tedford
- Produced by: Gordon Hollingshead
- Starring: Faye Emerson
- Cinematography: Harry Hallenberger
- Distributed by: Warner Bros.
- Release date: October 2, 1943
- Running time: 21 minutes
- Country: United States
- Language: English

Women at War is a 1943 American short drama film directed by Jean Negulesco and starring Faye Emerson. It was written by Charles L. Tedford. The film was nominated for an Academy Award at the 1944 16th Academy Awards for Best Short Subject (Two-Reel).

== Cast ==
- Faye Emerson as Anastasia 'Stormy' Hart
- Dorothy Day as Lorna Travis
- Marjorie Hoshelle as Sgt. Ramsey
- Virginia Christine as Mary Sawyer
- Robert Warwick as Maj. Gen. 'Blood and Thunder' Travis
