= Mardi Gras (1943 film) =

1943 film

- Directed by: Hugh Bennett
- Written by: Ray Spencer
- Produced by: Louis Harris
- Starring: Betty Jane Rhodes
- Cinematography: Harry Hallenberger; George Barnes
- Edited by: Gladys Carley
- Distributed by: Paramount Pictures
- Release date: October 1, 1943
- Running time: 19 minutes
- Country: United States
- Language: English

Mardi Gras is a 1943 American short musical film directed by Hugh Bennett. It was nominated for an Academy Award at the 16th Academy Awards for Best Short Subject (Two-Reel).

== Cast ==
- Betty Jane Rhodes as Suzy Brown (as Betty Rhodes)
- Johnnie Johnston as Johnnie Jones
- Val Setz as juggler
- Adriana as comedy trampoline act( as Adriana and Charley)
- Charley as comedy trampoline act (as Adriana and Charley)
- George Rogers as dance specialty (as Rogers Trio)
- Dorothy Rogers as dance specialty (as Rogers Trio)
- Don Kramer as dance specialty (as Rogers Trio)
- Bert Roach as chamberlain
- Douglas Wood as Harrison Piske
- Winifred Harris as Mrs. Piske
- Don Wilson as announcer
