= James Corrigan (actor) =

American actor

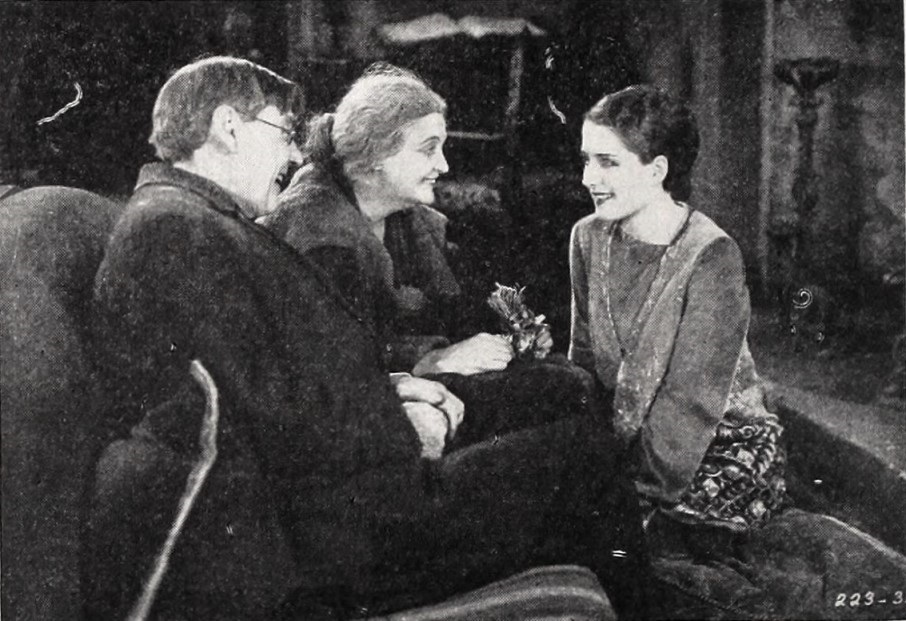
- Corrigan (left) in A Slave of Fashion (1925)
- Born: 17 October 1867; Dayton, Ohio, U.S.
- Died: 28 February 1929 (aged 61); Los Angeles, California, U.S.
- Occupation: Actor
- Years active: 1920–1927
- Spouse: Lillian Elliott
- Children: Lloyd Corrigan

James Corrigan (17 October 1867 – 28 February 1929), was an American actor. He appeared in 16 films between 1920 and 1927.

He was born in Dayton, Ohio, and died in Los Angeles, California.

Married to actress Lillian Elliott, Corrigan was the father of actor Lloyd Corrigan.

== Filmography ==
Year	Title	Role	Notes
1920	The Jack-Knife Man	George Rapp	
1921	Brewster's Millions	Mr. Ingraham	Lost film
1921	The Sky Pilot	Honorable Ashley	
1921	Peck's Bad Boy	George W. Peck - Henry's Pa	
1921	Lavender and Old Lace	Jimmy Ball	Lost film
1922	A Front Page Story	Matt Hayward	Lost film
1923	Divorce	George Reed	Lost film
1923	Her Reputation	'Dad' Lawrence	Lost film
1923	April Showers	Matt Gallagher	Lost film
1924	The Man from Wyoming	Governor of Wyoming	Lost film
1924	The White Sin	Peter Van Gore	
1924	The Law Forbids	John Martin	Lost film
1925	A Slave of Fashion	Father Emerson	Lost film
1925	Durand of the Bad Lands	Joe Gore	Lost film
1926	The Auction Block	Mr. Knight	Lost film
1927	Johnny Get Your Hair Cut	Pop Slocum	(final film role)
