= Russian Soil =

- Distributed by: Amkino Corporation
- Release date: 1941
- Country: USSR
- Language: Russian

Russian Soil (Russian: Русская земля, romanized: Russkaya zemlya) is a 1941 short documentary film produced in the Soviet Union. At the 14th Academy Awards, it was nominated for the Best Documentary Short.
