= A Slave of Fashion =

1925 film

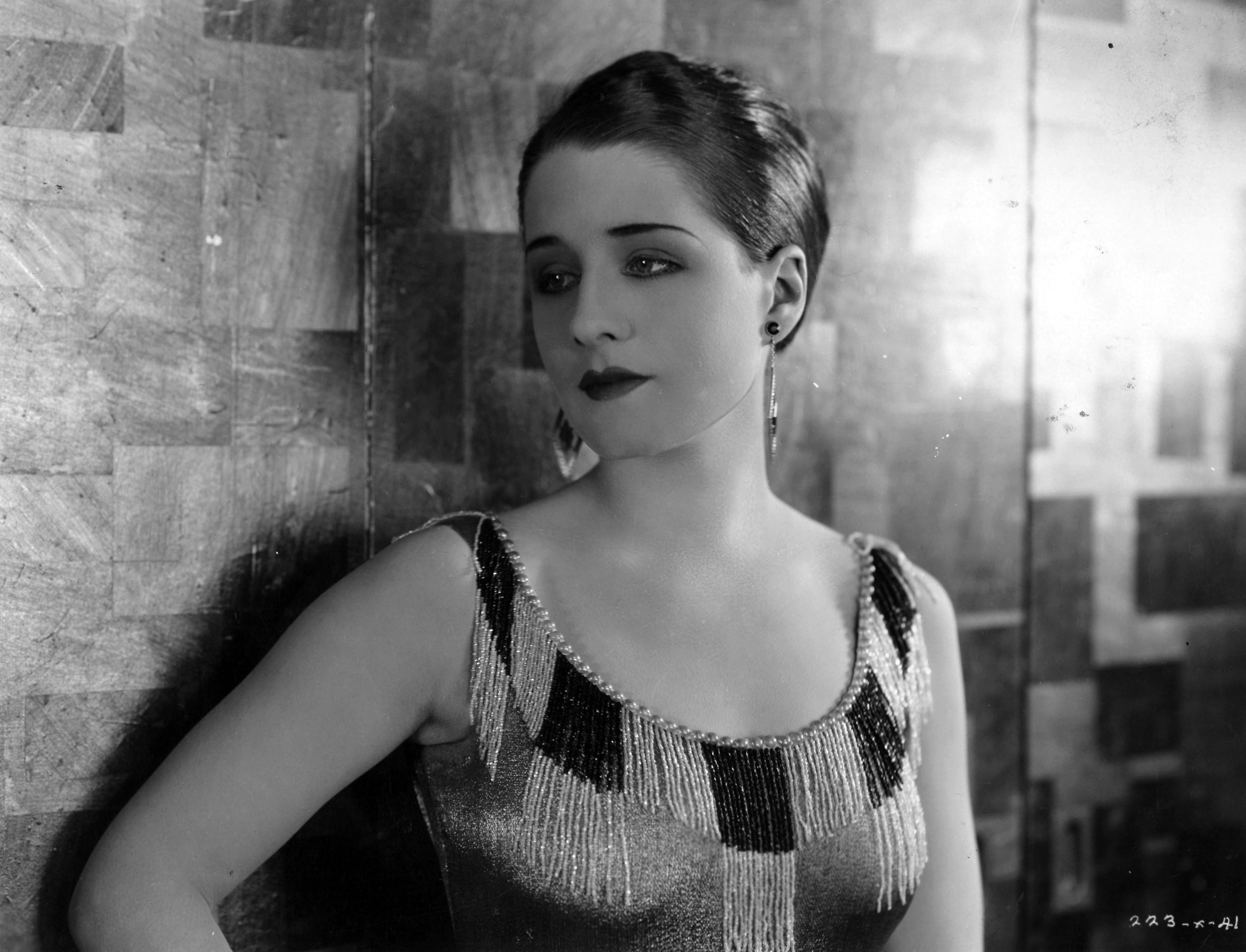
- Norma Shearer in A Slave of Fashion
- Directed by: Hobart Henley
- Written by: Bess Meredyth; Jane Murfin
- Story by: Samuel Shipman
- Starring: Norma Shearer
- Cinematography: Ben F. Reynolds
- Distributed by: Metro-Goldwyn-Mayer
- Release date: September 23, 1925 (U.S.)
- Running time: 60 minutes
- Country: United States
- Language: Silent (English intertitles)

A Slave of Fashion is a 1925 American silent romantic comedy film directed by Hobart Henley. The film stars Norma Shearer and Lew Cody, with William Haines. A young Joan Crawford had an early uncredited role as a mannequin.

== Plot ==
As described in a film magazine reviews, Katherine Emerson, a young county woman, is on a train to New York City when it is wrecked. She comes into possession of a purse of a victim, the mistress of a wealthy bachelor. She replaces the dead woman in the home of the bachelor, who is in Europe. An unexpected visit from her family forces her to pretend to be the wife of the wealthy bachelor. The mother cables the bachelor as a result of a growing friendship with a refined young society man. He returns unexpectedly and insists that she continue to play the game. Katherine threatens to tell her folks of her folly, but the bachelor sets things aright by taking her to the minister.

== Cast ==
- Norma Shearer as Katherine Emerson
- Lew Cody as Nicholas Wentworth
- William Haines as Dick Wayne
- Mary Carr as Mother Emerson
- James Corrigan as Father Emerson
- Vivia Ogden as Aunt Sophie
- Miss DuPont as Madeline
- Estelle Clark as Mayme
- Sidney Bracey as Hobson (credited as Sidney Bracy)
- Joan Crawford as Mannequin (uncredited)

== "Radio-Cinema" Experiment, 24 August 1925 ==
MGM's Douglas Shearer developed and supervised a one-time theatrical synchronization of the film's projected footage with dialogue broadcast in synchronization from the KFI radio studies in Los Angeles. On the evening of 24 August 1925, for one of the silent film's intermediate 1000-foot reels, theater audiences heard stars Norma Shearer and Lew Cody delivering their lines via a KFI radio broadcast (all of KFI's listeners heard the dialogue as well). Douglas Shearer had worked out a method to keep all 13 theaters' projectors synchronized with the "master" projector he viewed in the broadcast studio along with the actors sharing a microphone; and each theater had installed radio receivers for the evening.

== Preservation ==
With no copies listed in any film archives, A Slave of Fashion is considered lost.
