= The Invisible Woman (1940 film) =

1940 film by A. Edward Sutherland

- Directed by: A. Edward Sutherland
- Screenplay by: Robert Lees; Fred Rinaldo; Gertrude Purcell
- Story by: Kurt Siodmak; Joe May
- Starring: Virginia Bruce; John Barrymore; John Howard; Charlie Ruggles; Oscar Homolka
- Cinematography: Elwood Bredell, A.S.C
- Edited by: Frank Gross
- Production company: Universal Pictures Company, Inc.
- Distributed by: Universal Pictures
- Release date: 27 December 1940
- Running time: 72 minutes
- Country: United States
- Language: English
- Box office: ≈$660,000

The Invisible Woman is a 1940 American science fiction comedy film directed by A. Edward Sutherland. It is the third film in Universal Pictures' The Invisible Man film series, following 1933's The Invisible Man and The Invisible Man Returns, which was released earlier in the year. It is structured as a screwball comedy, rather than the melodrama of the previous two films.

It follows the plot of Kitty Carroll, an attractive and adventurous model who becomes invisible after a test of an invisibility machine invented by the eccentric Professor Gibbs, while complications arise when three comic gangsters steal the machine to use it on their boss.

The film stars Virginia Bruce, John Barrymore, John Howard, Charlie Ruggles and Oscar Homolka, with Margaret Hamilton, Shemp Howard and Charles Lane among those in the supporting cast. It was released on December 27, 1940.

== Plot ==
Wealthy lawyer Richard Russell funds the dotty old inventor Professor Gibbs in his creation of an invisibility device. The first test subject for this machine is Kitty Carroll, a department store model who has been fired from her previous job. The machine proves quite successful, and Kitty uses her invisible state to pay back her sadistic former boss, Mr. Growley.

While the Professor and the invisible Kitty are off visiting Russell's lodge, gangster Blackie Cole sends in his gang of moronic thugs—including “Hammerhead’—to steal the device. Once the machine is back at their hideout, they cannot get it to work. Kitty is now visible, and Blackie sends the gang to kidnap her and the Professor. Kitty learns that alcohol will restore her invisibility, and, with Russell's help, she exploits this to defeat the gang.

Kitty has married Richard and become a mother. After an alcohol rub, their infant son begins to fade from view. “Hmmm,” the Professor says to the audience. “Hereditary!”

== Cast ==
Cast is sourced from the book Universal Horrors:

- Virginia Bruce as Kitty Carroll
- John Barrymore as Professor Gibbs
- John Howard as Richard Russell
- Charlie Ruggles as George
- Oscar Homolka as Blackie
- Edward Brophy as Bill
- Donald MacBride as Foghorn
- Margaret Hamilton as Mrs. Jackson
- Shemp Howard as Frankie
- Anne Nagel as Jean
- Kathryn Adams as Peggy
- Maria Montez as Marie
- Charles Lane as Grawley
- Mary Gordon as Mrs. Bates
- Thurston Hall as Hudson
- Eddie Conrad as Hernandez

Uncredited

- Harry C. Bradley as want-ad clerk
- Kay Linaker as showroom buyer
- Sarah Edwards as fashion show buyer

== Production ==
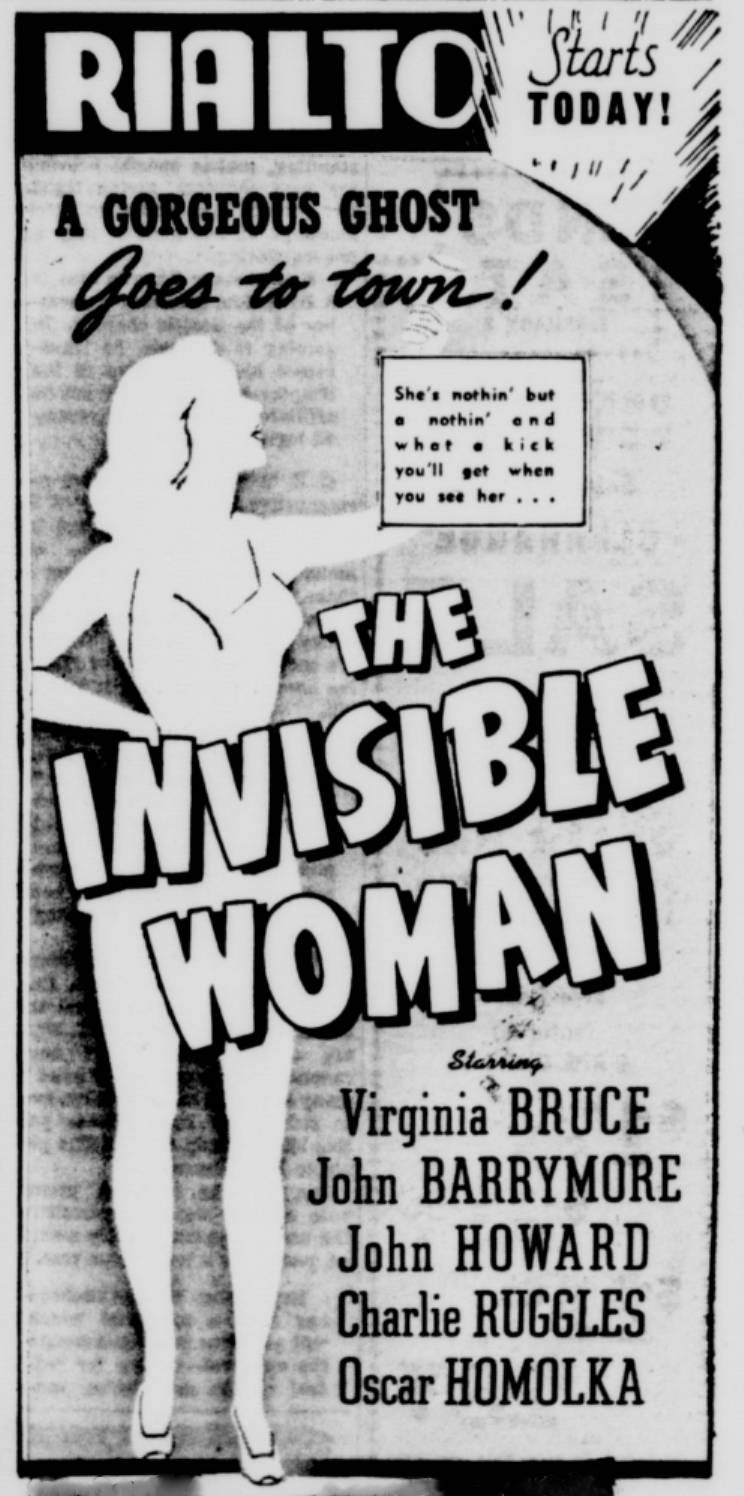
Theatrical advertisement from 1941

After the success of The Invisible Man Returns, Universal Pictures began work on a followup and signed Curt Siodmak to develop the idea in 1940 with comedy writers Frederic I. Rinaldo and Robert Lees. Universal gave the film a $300,000 budget. Margaret Sullivan had originally been slated for the role of the invisible woman because she owed Universal one more film in her contract. Director John Cromwell approached Sullivan about playing the lead in So Ends Our Night, and she failed to report to Universal for The Invisible Woman. Sullivan received a restraining order preventing her from working elsewhere. Eventually, she was allowed to finish So Ends the Night, as long as she continued work on two films for Universal. Virginia Bruce was cast as the invisible woman and signed her contract on September 12, 1940.

John Barrymore began to have trouble memorizing his dialogue. According to John Howard, Barrymore began cutting up the script and placing pieces on the set—behind vases, phones or other props—so he could read the lines.

Howard reminisced that "Barrymore was an ordinary fellow. He wasn't stuffy and he had no pretense whatsoever. Even in pictures that you felt weren't up to snuff, I don't think he showed any disdain. We knew perfectly well The Invisible Woman wasn't going to be an award-winning picture, but it was fun to do. No one took it seriously".

Billed 12th in the cast list, Maria Montez plays one of Grawley's models, alongside Virginia Bruce. This was her second film appearance, following Boss of Bullion City, a Johnny Mack Brown western, released nine months earlier.

== Reception ==
The film was nominated for the 14th Academy Awards for Special Effects. (At the time, the category embraced photographic and sound effects.) The photographic effects were by John P. Fulton and the sound effects by John Hall. I Wanted Wings won the Oscar for Special Effects.

At the time of its release, this film was considered slightly risqué because much is made of the fact that the heroine, though invisible, is naked during much of the action.

On its release, The Invisible Woman grossed a total of just under $660,000. Universal followed it with Invisible Agent on July 31, 1942.

Theodore Strauss of The New York Times called the film "silly, banal and repetitious ... The script is as creaky as a two-wheeled cart and were it not for the fact that John Barrymore is taking a ride in it we hate to think what The Invisible Woman might have turned out to be". Variety called it "good entertainment for general audiences". Film Daily called it "laugh-packed", "brightly dialogued" and "a lot of fun". Harrison's Reports declared it "a pretty good comedy for the masses ... but it does not offer anything new to those who saw the other pictures in which the character became invisible". John Mosher of The New Yorker wrote: "The old stunt is still good, yet it's not used to much advantage here ... In fact, this is the feeblest example so far of that stunt which the camera can so easily make funny".

== Reboot ==
In November 2019, a spin-off film centered around the female counterpart to Invisible Man was in development. Elizabeth Banks will star in, direct, and produce The Invisible Woman, based on her own original pitch. Erin Cressida Wilson will write the script of the reboot of the female monster, while Max Handelman and Alison Small will serve as producer and executive producer, respectively. Banks was allowed to choose a project by Universal Pictures from the roster of Universal Monsters, ultimately choosing The Invisible Woman.

== See also ==
- John Barrymore on stage, screen and radio
- List of science fiction films of the 1940s
