= Johnny Get Your Hair Cut =

1927 film

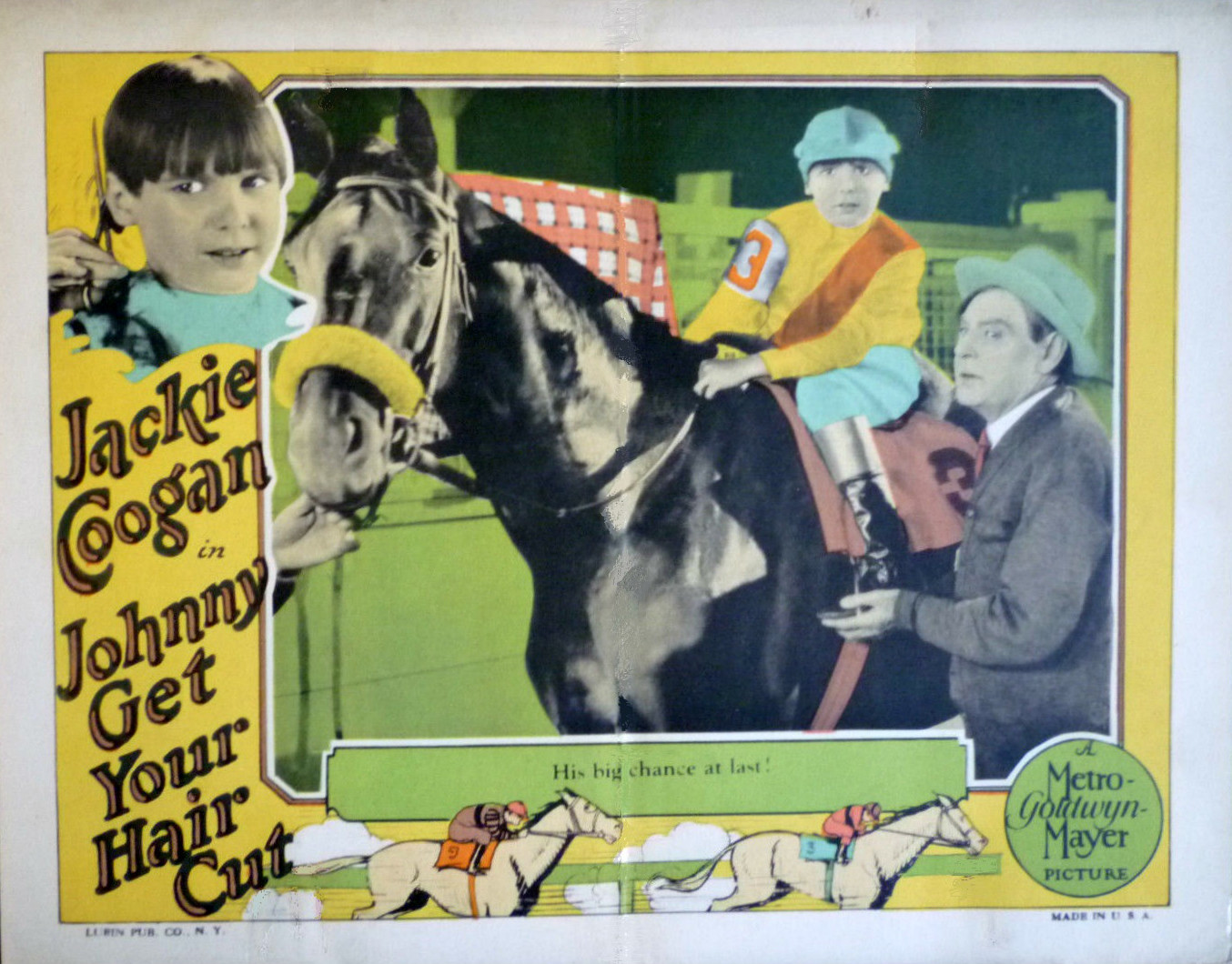
- Lobby card.
- Directed by: B. Reeves Eason; Archie Mayo
- Written by: Gerald Beaumont; Florence Ryerson; Ralph Spence
- Starring: Harry Carey
- Cinematography: Frank B. Good
- Edited by: Sam Zimbalist
- Distributed by: Metro-Goldwyn-Mayer
- Release date: January 15, 1927
- Running time: 7 reels
- Country: United States
- Language: Silent (English intertitles)

Johnny Get Your Hair Cut is a 1927 silent American comedy film directed by B. Reeves Eason starring Jackie Coogan and featuring Harry Carey. A print is preserved by Metro-Goldwyn-Mayer, but is not publicly available.

== Cast ==
- Jackie Coogan as Johnny O'Day
- Harry Carey
- James Corrigan as Pop Slocum
- Maurice Costello as Baxter Ryan
- Bobby Doyle as Bobby Dolin
- Knute Erickson as Whip Evans
- Pat Hartigan as Jiggs Bradley
- Mattie Witting as Mother Slap

== Production ==
The film was seen by MGM as a way to transition Coogan from a child star to a more serious adult actor. To this end, the company had Coogan change his haircut from a Dutch bob. Coogan's father hired Eason as director following his work on 1925's Ben-Hur.

== See also ==
- Harry Carey filmography
- Jackie Coogan filmography
