= Beauty and the Beach =

- Directed by: Leslie M. Roush
- Written by: Justin Herman
- Produced by: Leslie M. Roush
- Starring: Johnny Long
- Cinematography: William O. Steiner
- Distributed by: Paramount Pictures
- Release date: September 26, 1941
- Running time: 11 minutes
- Country: United States
- Language: English

Beauty and the Beach is a 1941 American short musical film directed by Leslie M. Roush. It was nominated for an Academy Award at the 14th Academy Awards for Best Short Subject (One-Reel).

== Cast ==
- Johnny Long as Orchestra Leader
