= Divorce (1923 film) =

1923 silent film

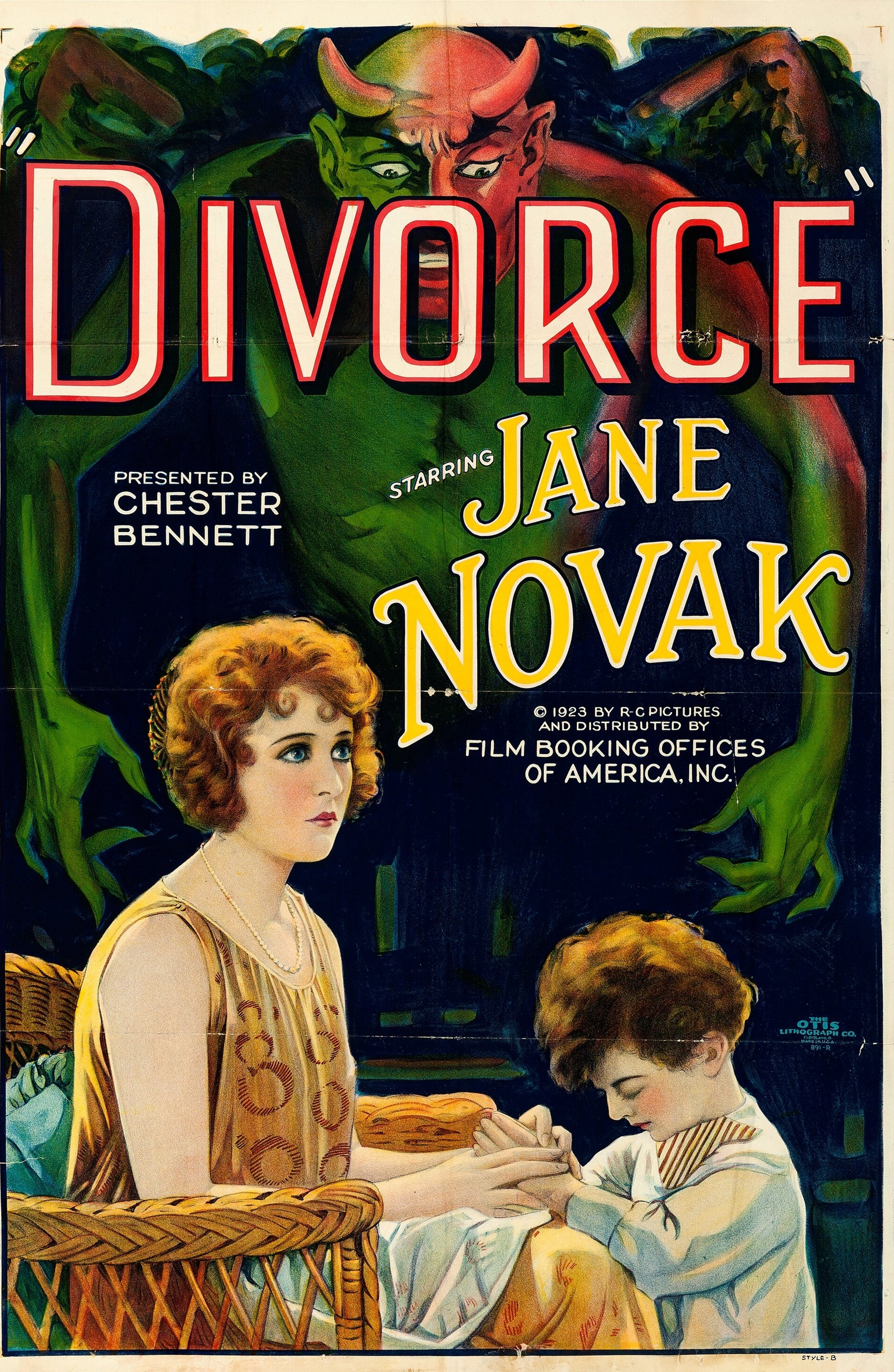
- Directed by: Chester Bennett
- Written by: Andrew Bennison
- Starring: Jane Novak; John Bowers; James Corrigan
- Cinematography: Jack MacKenzie
- Production company: Film Booking Offices of America
- Distributed by: Film Booking Offices of America
- Release date: June 10, 1923
- Running time: 60 minutes
- Country: United States
- Languages: Silent; English intertitles

Divorce is a 1923 American silent drama film directed by Chester Bennett and starring Jane Novak, John Bowers and James Corrigan.

== Cast ==
- Jane Novak as Jane Parker
- John Bowers as Jim Parker
- James Corrigan as George Reed
- Edythe Chapman as Mrs. George Reed
- Margaret Livingston as Gloria Gayne
- Freeman Wood as Townsend Perry
- George McGuire as Tom Tucker
- George Fisher as Winthrop Avery
- Philippe De Lacy as 'Dicky' Parker

== Preservation ==
With no prints of Divorce located in any film archives, it is considered a lost film.

== Bibliography ==
- Munden, Kenneth White. The American Film Institute Catalog of Motion Pictures Produced in the United States, Part 1. University of California Press, 1997.
