= Estelle Clark =

Polish-American film actress

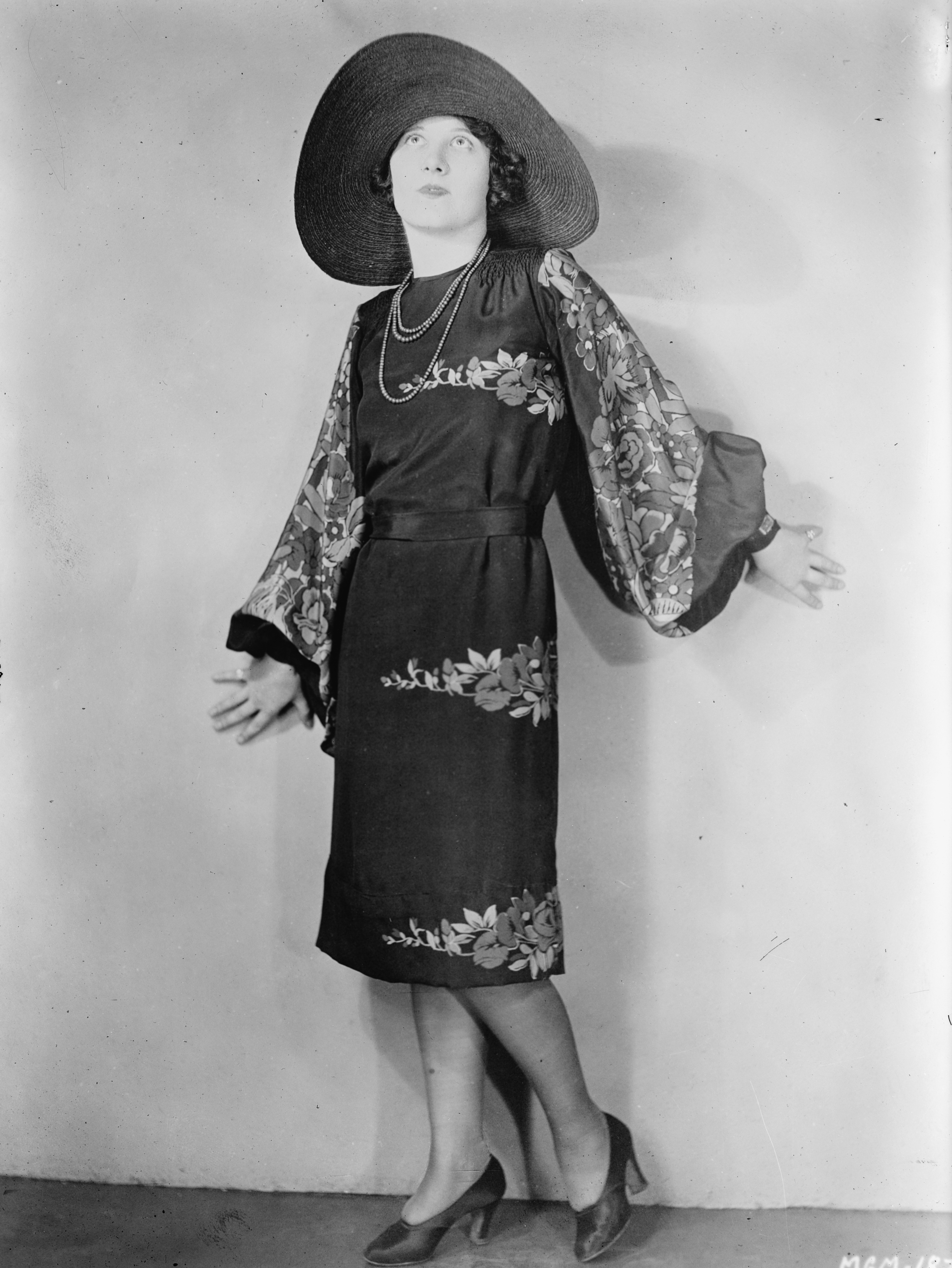
- Clark, c. 1926
- Born: Stasia Zwolinska; May 7, 1898; Warsaw, Kingdom of Poland
- Died: December 3, 1982 (aged 84); Ventura, California, U.S.
- Occupation: Actress
- Years active: 1924-1935

Estelle Clark (May 7, 1898 - December 3, 1982) was a Polish-American film actress with a career spanning between the 1920s and 1930s.

== Early life ==
Clark was born as Stasia Zwolinska in Warsaw in 1898 to Francis and Josephine Zwolinski. She had two older siblings, Janina and Eugene. In 1901, the family emigrated to the United States. The family initially lived in New York, before moving to Cleveland and lastly to Detroit, where Clark graduated from high school.

== Career ==
Clark encountered strong opposition from her parents to become an actress, who encouraged her to pursue a college education instead of becoming an actress. Before becoming an actress, Clark worked in an office to financially support her idea of becoming an actress. At the end, her father supported the idea of her daughter of becoming an actress. In 1921, she moved to Los Angeles to start her career as an actress, although it was interrupted because of the death of her mother, and she returned to Detroit to take care of her father. In 1923, she restarted her idea of becoming a film actress, showing interest in film again. American silent cinema was gaining followers and it needed a new actress and Clark started to show attention for it. When the first film proposal came out, she changed her name from Stasia Zwolinska to Estelle Clark. In 1923, she appeared in her first film Pleasure Mad, in which she earned the attention of directors. She subsequently appeared in the films Sinners in Silk (1924), So This Is Marriage (1924), The Denial (1925), A Slave of Fashion (1925), Tillie the Toiler, and Hollywood Trouble (1935), among others.

== Personal life ==
Clark married in 1922 to Joseph Belcher Mills and divorced in 1923.

== Death ==
Clark died in Ventura, California on December 3, 1982.

== Filmography ==
- Sinners in Silk (1924)
- So This Is Marriage (1924)
- The Denial (1925)
- A Slave of Fashion (1925)
- The Merry Widow (1925)
- Don't (1925)
- His Secretary (1925)
- Dance Madness (1926)
- The Boy Friend (1926)
- Tillie the Toiler (1927)
- The Crowd (1928)
