= Vera Zorina =

German-Norwegian ballerina, actress and choreographer (1917–2003)

- Publicity photo for Star Spangled Rhythm, 1942
- Born: Eva Brigitta Hartwig; January 2, 1917; Berlin, Germany
- Died: April 9, 2003 (aged 86); Santa Fe, New Mexico, U.S.
- Occupations: Ballerina; musical theatre actress; choreographer
- Years active: 1928–1982
- Spouses: George Balanchine (m. 1938; div. 1946) Goddard Lieberson (m. 1946; died 1977) Paul Wolfe (m. 1991)
- Children: 2, including Peter Lieberson

Eva Brigitta Hartwig (January 2, 1917 – April 9, 2003), known professionally as Vera Zorina, was a German-Norwegian ballerina, theatre and film actress, and choreographer, chiefly remembered for her films choreographed by her husband George Balanchine. They include the Slaughter on Tenth Avenue sequence from On Your Toes, The Goldwyn Follies, I Was an Adventuress with Erich Von Stroheim and Peter Lorre, Louisiana Purchase with Bob Hope, and dancing to "That Old Black Magic" in Paramount Pictures' Star Spangled Rhythm.

== Background ==
Zorina was born in Berlin, Germany. Her father Fritz Hartwig was a German lapsed Roman Catholic, and her mother Abigail Johanne Wimpelmann (known as Billie Hartwig) was Norwegian and Lutheran. Both were professional singers. Zorina was brought up in Kristiansund, a small coastal town between Trondheim and Molde, where she debuted as a dancer at the local theatre, Festiviteten. She received her education at the Lyceum for Girls in Berlin and was trained in dance by Olga Preobrajenska and Nicholas Legat.

== Career ==
At age 12, she was presented to Max Reinhardt, who cast her in A Midsummer Night's Dream (1929) and Tales of Hoffmann (1931). A performance at London's Gaiety Theatre won her an invitation to join the Ballet Russe de Monte Carlo in 1933, at which time she was obliged to adopt the stage name of Vera Zorina. The company wanted only Russian names. She was given a list of 20 and chose the last one because she could pronounce it.

A few years later, she attained a lead role in the London production of On Your Toes (1937), choreography by her husband George Balanchine. American film producer Samuel Goldwyn saw it and signed her to a seven-year film contract. She appeared in seven Hollywood movies between 1938 and 1946.

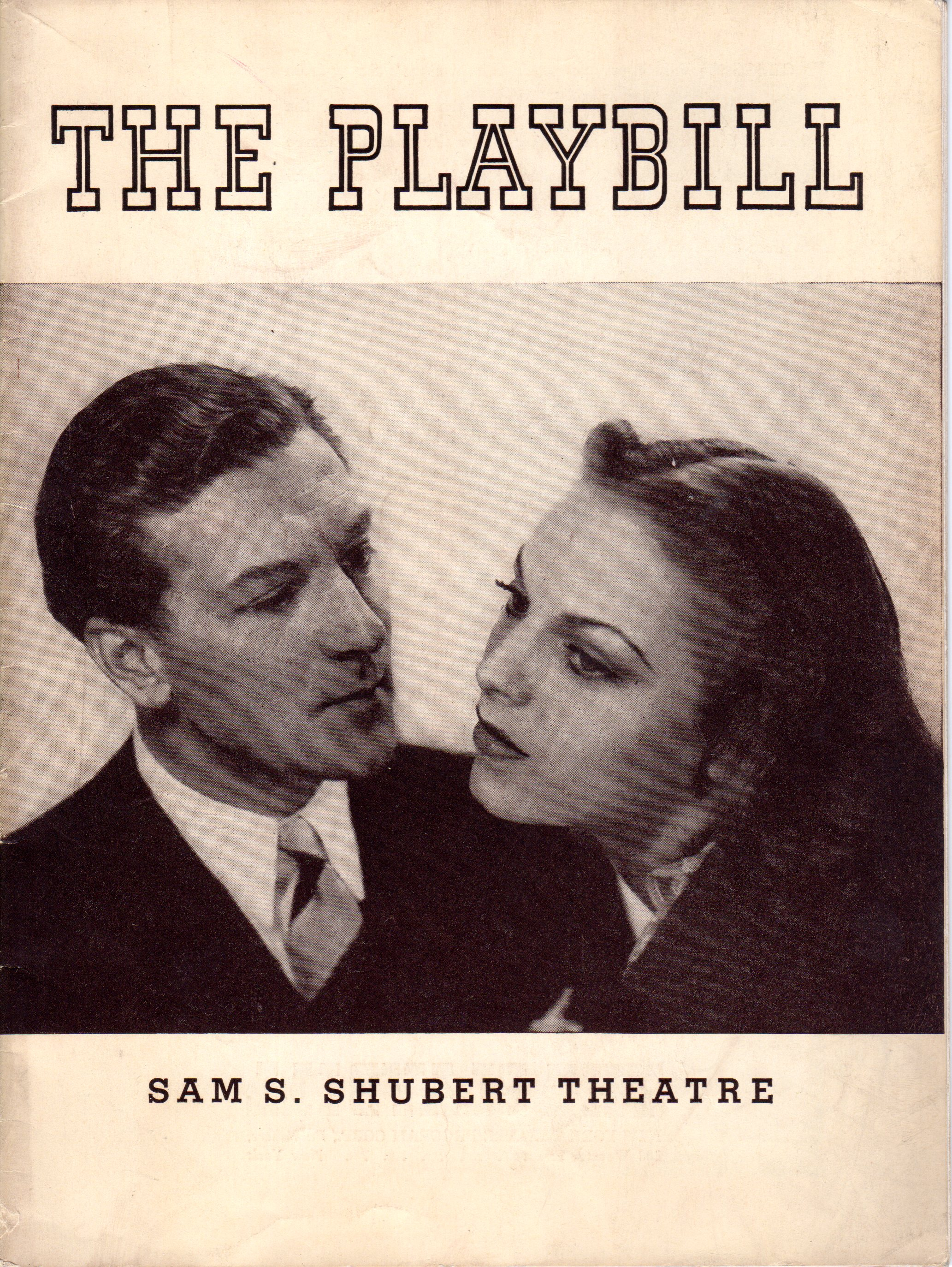
Playbill from I Married an Angel (1938) starring Vera Zorina

Zorina lost the role of Maria in the 1943 film adaptation of For Whom the Bell Tolls to Ingrid Bergman after only two weeks of shooting, due to her appearance not fitting the role.

One of her major stage roles was in the 1938 Rodgers and Hart musical I Married an Angel. As the title character, she played an angel who descended from heaven to marry a Hungarian banker played by Dennis King, whose complete lack of human guile presented him with a whole new set of problems. The role in the 1942 film version was played by Jeanette MacDonald.

In 1945, she had great success as Ariel in William Shakespeare's The Tempest at the Alvin Theatre (which became the Neil Simon Theatre) on Broadway. Starting in 1948, Zorina appeared in Arthur Honegger's Joan of Arc at the Stake, playing the title role in the first American performance with the New York Philharmonic under Charles Münch. She subsequently commanded the role many times, including the recording at the Royal Festival Hall in June 1966, with the London Symphony Orchestra under Seiji Ozawa. In 1968, she directed Cabaret at the Oslo Nye Teater to great acclaim. Her farewell performance was in Perséphone with New York City Ballet in 1982. In the 1970s, Vera Zorina was appointed director of the Norwegian National Opera and Ballet (Den Norske Opera & Ballet), but withdrew before she settled in because of her husband's illness.

She was active with Lincoln Center as an adviser and director and, for several seasons, directed operas at the Santa Fe Opera in New Mexico. In 1986, she completed Zorina, her autobiography.

== Personal life ==
Zorina was married in 1938 to choreographer George Balanchine (her first marriage and his second); the couple divorced in 1946. She danced in productions he choreographed for both stage and screen, including On Your Toes, a Broadway hit later adapted for the screen by Lawrence Riley.

From 1946, her second husband was Columbia Records president Goddard Lieberson until his death on May 29, 1977. They had two sons: Peter Lieberson, a composer, and Jonathan Lieberson. Her final marriage in 1991 was to harpsichordist Paul Wolfe until her death in 2003 at age 86 of undisclosed causes.

Zorina was the grandmother of sisters Elizabeth (Lizzie), Katherine, and Kristina Lieberson, who were members of the band TEEN.

Zorina was a devout Catholic and Oblate of the Benedictine Order.

== Filmography ==
Film
Year	Title	Role	Notes
1931	Seine Freundin Annette	Jaqueline, Damartins Tochter	
1938	The Goldwyn Follies	Olga Samara	
1939	On Your Toes	Vera Barnova	
1940	I Was an Adventuress	Countess Tanya Vronsky	
1941	Louisiana Purchase	Marina Von Minden	
1942	Star Spangled Rhythm	Herself - 'That Old Black Magic' Number	
1944	Follow the Boys	Gloria Vance	
1946	Lover Come Back	Madeline Laslo	(final film role)
