= Sagebrush and Silver =

1941 film

- Produced by: Truman Talley
- Cinematography: Jack Kuhne
- Distributed by: Twentieth-Century Fox
- Release date: August 15, 1941
- Running time: 10 minutes
- Country: United States
- Language: English

Sagebrush and Silver is a 1941 American short documentary film. It was nominated for an Academy Award at the 14th Academy Awards for Best Short Subject (One-Reel).
