= Charles Laskey =

American ballet dancer (1908-1998)

Charles Laskey (September 20, 1908 – December 13, 1998) was an American ballet dancer and occasional performer in musical theatre, best remembered for his association with George Balanchine.

As a ballet dancer, Laskey performed with Balanchine's American Ballet, Ballet Caravan, and the New York City Ballet, as well as with the Metropolitan Opera Ballet and Eleanor King's Little Group. He originated roles in a number of George Balanchine's works, including Serenade (1935), and he danced for Eugene Loring and Lew Christensen.

After making his Broadway debut in a production of Lysistrata (1930), Laskey was the principal dancer in I Married an Angel and Louisiana Purchase, both choreographed by Balanchine. He toured as Dream Curly in Oklahoma!, although Agnes de Mille initially was displeased with his performance.

Laskey followed Balanchine to Hollywood, performing in On Your Toes (1939), I Was an Adventuress (1940), and Louisiana Purchase (1941).

Laskey is survived by his sons Charles Jr. and Dr. Richard A. Laskey.

== See also ==
- George Balanchine
- New York City Ballet
