= A Front Page Story =

1922 film by Jess Robbins

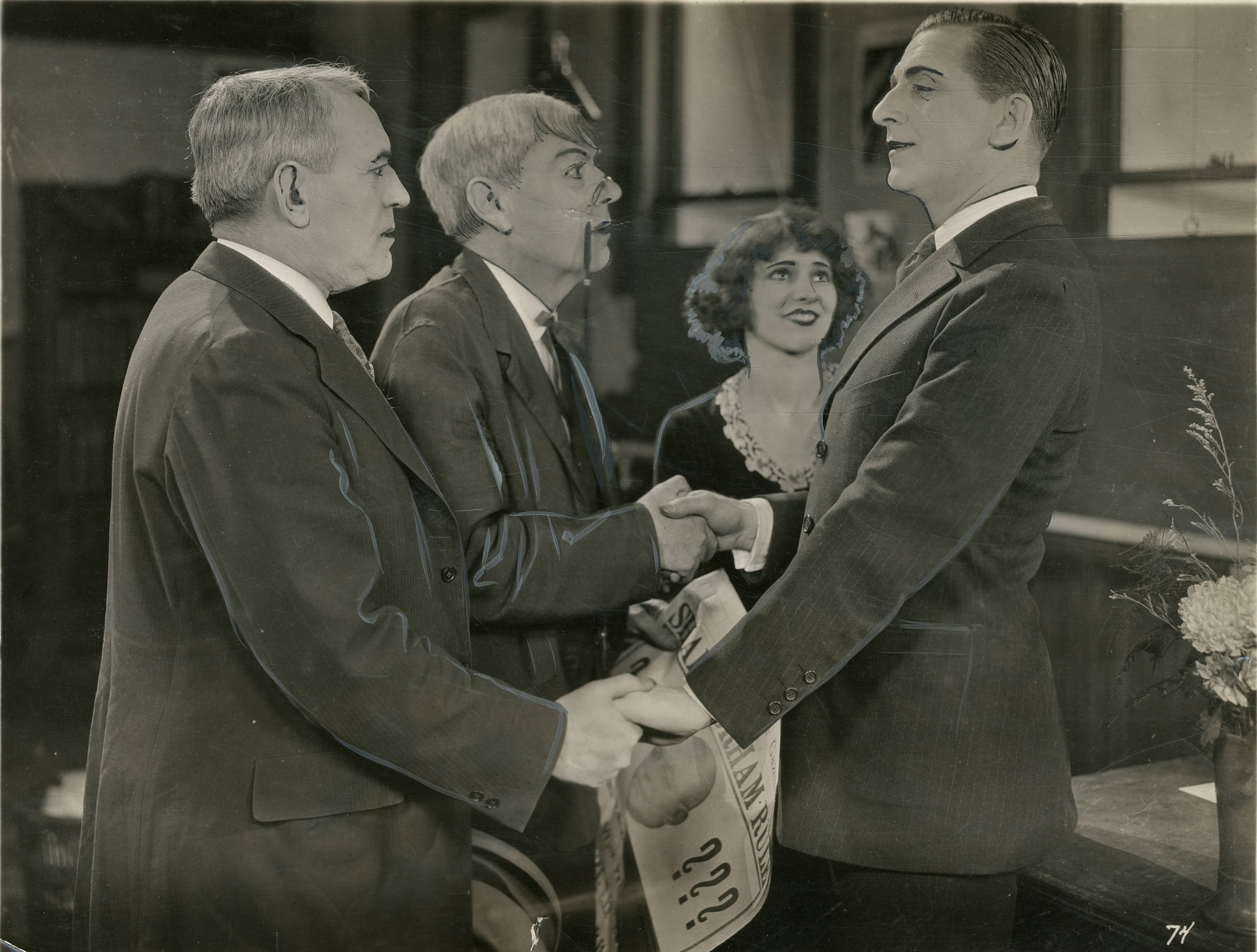
- Still
- Directed by: Jess Robbins
- Written by: F.W. Beebee
- Story by: Arthur F. Goodrich
- Starring: Edward Everett Horton; Lloyd Ingraham; James Corrigan
- Cinematography: Vernon L. Walker
- Production company: Vitagraph Company of America
- Distributed by: Vitagraph Company of America
- Release date: December 25, 1922
- Running time: 60 minutes
- Country: United States
- Language: Silent (English intertitles)

A Front Page Story is a 1922 American silent comedy film directed by Jess Robbins and starring Edward Everett Horton, Lloyd Ingraham, and James Corrigan.

== Cast ==
- Edward Everett Horton as Rodney Marvin
- Lloyd Ingraham as Mayor Gorham
- James Corrigan as Matt Hayward
- Edith Roberts as Virginia Hayward
- W.E. Lawrence as Don Coates
- Buddy Messinger as Tommy
- Mathilde Brundage as Mrs. Gorham
- Lila Leslie as Suzanne Gorham
- Tom McGuire as Jack Peeler

== Bibliography ==
- Monaco, James. The Encyclopedia of Film. Perigee Books, 1991.
