= Newell, North Carolina =

- Unincorporated community
- Location within North Carolina Location within the United States
- Coordinates: 35°16′47″N 80°44′08″W
- Country: United States
- State: North Carolina
- County: Mecklenburg
- Elevation: 755 ft (230 m)
- Time zone: UTC-5 (Eastern (EST))
  - Summer (DST): UTC-4 (EDT)
- ZIP Code: 28126 (PO Box)
- Area codes: 704 & 980
- GNIS feature ID: 991122

Newell is an unincorporated community in Mecklenburg County, North Carolina, United States. The community is located along the northeastern edge of Charlotte, and most of it has been annexed by the city. Newell has a post office with ZIP code 28126.
