= George Montgomery (set decorator) =

American set decorator

- Born: September 23, 1899
- Died: March 5, 1951 (aged 51)
- Occupation: Set decorator
- Years active: 1941-1951

George Montgomery (September 23, 1899 – March 5, 1951) was an American set decorator. He was nominated for an Academy Award in the category Best Art Direction for the film Ladies in Retirement. He worked on 74 films between 1941 and 1951.

== Selected filmography ==
- Ladies in Retirement (1941)
