= Louisiana Purchase (film) =

1941 film by Irving Cummings

- Theatrical release poster
- Directed by: Irving Cummings
- Screenplay by: Jerome Chodorov; Joseph Fields; Morrie Ryskind (play)
- Story by: Buddy G. DeSylva
- Based on: Louisiana Purchase by Irving Berlin
- Produced by: Harold Wilson
- Starring: Bob Hope; Vera Zorina; Victor Moore; Irène Bordoni; Dona Drake
- Cinematography: Harry Hallenberger; Ray Rennahan
- Edited by: LeRoy Stone
- Music by: Robert Emmett Dolan
- Production company: Paramount Pictures
- Distributed by: Paramount Pictures
- Release date: December 25, 1941
- Running time: 98 minutes
- Country: United States
- Language: English
- Box office: $2.75 million (U.S. and Canada rentals)

Louisiana Purchase is a 1941 American musical comedy film starring Bob Hope, Vera Zorina, and Victor Moore. It is an adaptation of Irving Berlin's 1940 Broadway musical of the same name. A Paramount Pictures production, the film was directed by Irving Cummings, with Robert Emmett Dolan serving as musical director as he had done for the play. The film satirises the US Democratic Party and political corruption. The film was Bob Hope's first feature film in Technicolor. The title refers to the State of Louisiana offering to drop the deceased leader Huey Long's controversial Share Our Wealth program, and fully support President Franklin Roosevelt and his New Deal. In return, FDR promised federal dollars for public works in Louisiana, a deal cynically referred to by many as the second Louisiana Purchase.

Starring Paramount's house comedian Bob Hope in the role William Gaxton played on stage, the film featured Vera Zorina, Victor Moore and Irène Bordoni reprising their stage roles. Raoul Pene Du Bois did the production and costume design and was nominated for the Academy Award for Best Art Direction-Interior Decoration, Color along with Stephen Seymour. The cinematography was by Harry Hallenberger and Ray Rennahan who also received a nomination for the Academy Award for Best Cinematography.

== Plot ==
The film begins with a Hollywood legal adviser giving dictation to his secretary that the stage show property Louisiana Purchase is unfilmable, unless strong disclaimers are made that it is a total work of fiction. The next scene features a musical number declaring that information.

Louisiana State Representative Jim Taylor is told by his fellow partners of the Louisiana Purchase Company who have engaged in misusing Federal government funds for their own avarice that a Republican Federal Senator Oliver P. Loganberry is arriving in the State during Mardi Gras in New Orleans. The Senator will conduct hearings to establish evidence of their corrupt conduct with Taylor's cronies deciding Taylor he will be the fall guy. Taylor has one chance to avoid imprisonment; lure the Republican Senator into a honey trap. Searching for a woman, Taylor's friend Madame Yvonne Bordelaise recommends the visiting European woman Marina Von Minden who is desperately seeking money to obtain a visa for her mother to leave Europe.

Marina initially goes along with the scheme and poses for incriminating photo when the Senator is tricked into getting drunk. She has a change of heart and decides to explain the photographs by saying the Senator Loganberry has proposed to her. Taylor has fallen in love with Marina and avoids the Senator making his charges in the Legislature by doing a filibuster for three days, with Taylor explaining that he has the express permission of James Stewart.

== Cast ==
- Bob Hope as Jim Taylor
- Vera Zorina as Marina Von Minden
- Victor Moore as Sen. Oliver P. Loganberry
- Irène Bordoni as Madame Yvonne Bordelaise
- Phyllis Ruth as Emmy Lou
- Dona Drake as Beatrice
- Raymond Walburn as Colonel Davis
- Maxie Rosenbloom as The Shadow aka Wilson
- Donald MacBride as Captain Pierre Whitfield
- Andrew Tombes as Dean Albert Manning
- Robert Warwick as Speaker of the House
- Charles La Torre as Gaston, Waiter
- Charles Laskey as Danseur
- Emory Parnell as Sam Horowitz, Lawyer
- Iris Meredith as Lawyer's secretary
- Catherine Craig as Saleslady
- Jack Norton as Jester
- Sam McDaniel as Sam
- Frances Gifford as Salesgirl
- Brooks Benedict as Senator
- Kay Aldridge as Louisiana Belle
- Karin Booth as Louisiana Belle
- Rebel Randall as Louisiana Belle
- Barbara Britton as Louisiana Belle
- Brooke Evans as Louisiana Belle
- Blanche Grady as Louisiana Belle
- Lynda Grey as Louisiana Belle
- Margaret Hayes as Louisiana Belle
- Louise LaPlanche as Louisiana Belle
- Barbara Slater as Louisiana Belle
- Eleanor Stewart as Louisiana Belle
- Jean Wallace as Louisiana Belle
