= Dolores (song) =

1941 song by Louis Alter and Frank Loesser

"Dolores" is a song written by Louis Alter and Frank Loesser for the 1941 film Las Vegas Nights and recorded by Frank Sinatra with the Tommy Dorsey Band.

The Dorsey / Sinatra version topped the Billboard charts in 1941 closely followed by Bing Crosby's version with The Merry Macs which reached the No. 2 spot during a 15-week stay in the charts.
