= John Hall (sound editor) =

American sound editor (1906–1997)

- Born: John Donald Hall; September 24, 1906
- Died: June 8, 1997 (aged 90)
- Occupation: Sound editor

John Donald Hall (September 24, 1906 – June 8, 1997) was an American sound editor. He was nominated for an Academy Award in the category Best Special Effects for the film The Invisible Woman.

Hall died on June 8, 1997, at the age of 90.

== Selected filmography ==
- The Invisible Woman (1940; co-nominated with John P. Fulton)
