= Ladies in Retirement =

1941 American film noir directed by Charles Vidor

- Theatrical release poster
- Directed by: Charles Vidor
- Screenplay by: Garrett Fort; Reginald Denham
- Based on: the play Ladies in Retirement by Reginald Denham; Edward Percy
- Produced by: Lester Cowan
- Starring: Ida Lupino; Louis Hayward; Evelyn Keyes
- Cinematography: George Barnes
- Edited by: Al Clark
- Music by: Ernst Toch; Morris Stoloff
- Production company: Columbia Pictures
- Distributed by: Columbia Pictures
- Release date: September 18, 1941 (United States)
- Running time: 91 minutes
- Country: United States
- Language: English

Ladies in Retirement is a 1941 American film noir directed by Charles Vidor and starring Ida Lupino, Louis Hayward and Evelyn Keyes. It was produced and distributed by Columbia Pictures. Lupino and Hayward were married at the time. It is based on the play of the same title by Reginald Denham and Edward Percy, produced in London in 1939 and New York in 1940.

== Plot ==
Ellen Creed, a proud spinster fallen on hard times, has spent the past two years as housekeeper and companion to her old friend Leonora Fiske, a wealthy retiree who in her youth had been a chorus girl "of easy virtue". Ellen receives a letter threatening that unless she can tame her two peculiar sisters, the police will be called and the sisters will be evicted from their lodgings for outlandish behaviour. Leonora allows Ellen to invite her sisters to visit.

One day when Ellen is away, handsome young stranger Albert Feather appears, claiming to be Ellen's nephew. Leonora lends him money, but Albert makes her promise not to tell Ellen about either his visit or the loan.

Ellen returns with her sisters, who quickly wear out their welcome, proving to be a burden to Leonora and her maid Lucy. Leonora complains to Ellen, pointing out that two days have turned into six weeks and that the sisters are destroying her possessions and fraying her nerves. Leonora finally orders them out but Ellen pleads with Leonora, afraid that her sisters will be sent to an institution. In a rage, Ellen then strangles Leonora to death.

Ellen tells visitors and Lucy that Leonora is traveling. She tells her sisters that she bought the house and makes them swear that they will never talk about Leonora or that she sold the house.

Some nuns living nearby visit the house in a terrible storm to borrow some lamp oil. After Ellen sends Lucy to the shed, Lucy is surprised there by Albert, with whom Lucy had a flirtation the first time that he was at the Fiske home. He flirts with her again and asks her to promise not to tell Ellen that he has been there before or that he is in the shed. Instead, he visits through the front door, telling Ellen that he needs help and a place to stay because he is a wanted thief. Ellen refuses to allow Albert to stay and buys him a boat ticket out of the country and says that she will give him some money to make a new start.

Albert and Lucy find evidence that Ellen is hiding something about Leonora. They find Leonora's wig, wondering why she did not travel with it. Albert intercepts a letter from the bank asking why Leonora's signature on a check is much different than the one that they have on file. Albert reads the blotter after Ellen writes back to them about a "sprained wrist." Lucy is not able to figure out what is happening, but Albert is putting the pieces together.

Albert seduces Lucy and tries to steal the hidden money, but fails to find it. He has Lucy sit at the piano, playing Leonora's favourite song and wearing a wig with her back to Ellen, who screams at the sight of her and faints. Albert forgoes his trip in order to stay and blackmail his aunt so that he can have an easy life in the country. He confronts Ellen and she confesses, and he talks about his own crimes. Lucy overhears them and flees the house, and the neighbour nuns come to the door and Albert hides. The nuns tell Ellen that the police are looking for a man who fits Albert's description. Albert comes out of hiding and takes the ticket and money from her and leaves. Ellen's sisters return from their walk and tell her that they saw Albert playing tag with two men. Ellen smiles, dons her coat and hat, tells the sisters she's going to see some men, kisses them goodbye and departs into the fog.

== Cast ==
- Ida Lupino as Ellen Creed
- Louis Hayward as Albert Feather
- Evelyn Keyes as Lucy
- Elsa Lanchester as Emily Creed
- Edith Barrett as Louisa Creed
- Isobel Elsom as Leonora Fiske
- Emma Dunn as Sister Theresa
- Queenie Leonard as Sister Agatha
- Clyde Cook as Bates

== Casting ==
The film was based on a West End and Broadway play that starred Mary Clare in London and Flora Robson in New York - actresses of 47 and 38 respectively, playing a 60-year-old character. Cast in the same part, Ida Lupino was only 23 at the time. Studio boss Harry Cohn fumed, "You're out of your mind choosing this child to play that role." Director Charles Vidor did everything he could to make Lupino look at least 40, including limiting her makeup, pulling her hair back in a severe style and getting cinematographer Charles Barnes to light her face harshly. Barnes told her that "I'll do what I can with my camera, but nearly everything depends on your performance."

Isobel Elsom reprised her Broadway role as Leonora Fiske.

== Reception ==
=== Critical response ===
In a contemporary review, The New York Times called the film "... an exercise in slowly accumulating terror with all the psychological trappings of a Victorian thriller. ... It has been painstakingly done, beautifully photographed and tautly played, especially in its central role, and for the most part it catches all the script's nuances of horror quite as effectively as did the original play version ... Despite all its excellence, however, it must be added that Ladies in Retirement is a film for a proper and patient mood. It doesn't race through its story; It builds its terror step by step."

Writing for the Los Angeles Times, critic Edwin Schallert called the film "a dramatic and somber portrayal" that "discloses no end of pictorial interest." He praised Lupino's and Hayward's performances, writing "... the film's feminine star appears young for the role but this in many ways makes her interpretation especially interesting and requires the utmost of skill from Miss Lupino in her acting. This is a demand that she meets ably, as does Louis Hayward, who succeeds logically and ingeniously in unmasking her as the killer."

In the Hollywood Citizen-News, reviewer Carl Combs called Ladies in Retirement "a mighty fine movie ... eerie, atmospheric, and charged with melodrama, not to mention a half a dozen performances of considerable dramatic voltage. Its creepy qualities arise not from blood and thunder so much as from a sort of painful tenseness bred by insanity and murder."

=== Academy Award nominations ===
- Academy Award for Best Art Direction-Interior Decoration, Black-and-White: Lionel Banks and George Montgomery
- Academy Award for Best Music, Scoring of a Dramatic Picture: Morris Stoloff and Ernst Toch

== Adaptation ==
Lupino reprised her role in a radio adaptation of Ladies in Retirement on Ford Theater on CBS on May 6, 1949. Renee Ruben wrote the adaptation, and Fletcher Markle was the director.

== Bibliography ==
- Goble, Alan. The Complete Index to Literary Sources in Film. Walter de Gruyter, 1999.
- Fetrow, Alan G. Feature Films, 1940-1949: a United States Filmography. McFarland, 1994.
