= Soldiers of the Sky =

1941 film

- Directed by: Earl Allvine
- Written by: Russell G. Shields
- Produced by: Truman H. Talley
- Distributed by: Twentieth Century-Fox Film Corporation
- Release date: 1941
- Running time: 10 minutes
- Country: United States
- Language: English

Soldiers of the Sky is a 1941 American short documentary film, directed by Earl Allvine, about the 501st Parachute Infantry Regiment. It was part of Adventures of the Newsreel Cameraman, a series of documentary shorts produced by 20th Century Fox. It was nominated for an Academy Award for Best Documentary Short.
