= Peck's Bad Boy (1921 film) =

1921 film by Sam Wood

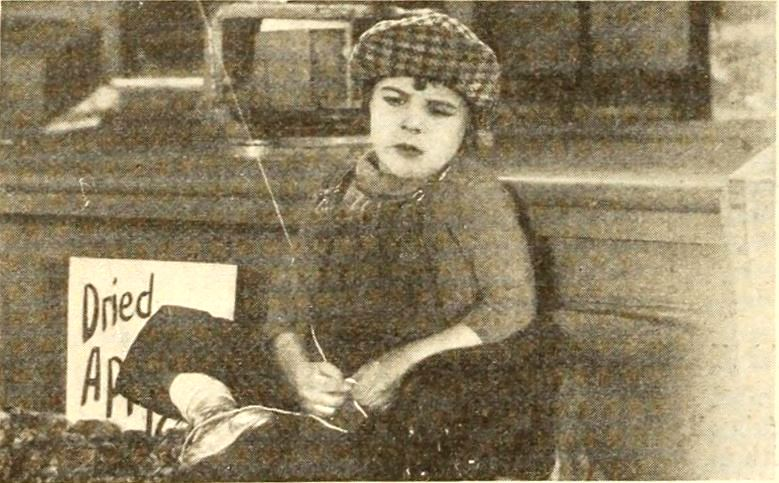
- Still of Jackie Coogan as the Bad Boy.
- Directed by: Sam Wood
- Written by: Irvin S. Cobb (titles); Sam Wood (adaptation)
- Based on: Peck's Bad Boy and His Pa by George W. Peck
- Produced by: Irving M. Lesser
- Starring: Jackie Coogan; Wheeler Oakman; Doris May; Raymond Hatton; James Corrigan; Lillian Leighton
- Cinematography: Alfred Gilks; Harry Hallenberger
- Edited by: W. Donn Hayes
- Production company: Peck's Bad Boy Co.
- Distributed by: Associated First National Pictures
- Release date: April 24, 1921
- Running time: 51 minutes
- Country: United States
- Languages: Silent film (English intertitles)

Peck's Bad Boy is a 1921 American silent comedy film directed by Sam Wood and starring Jackie Coogan, Wheeler Oakman, Doris May, Raymond Hatton, James Corrigan, and Lillian Leighton. It is based on the series of books by George W. Peck. The film was released by Associated First National Pictures on April 24, 1921.

== Cast ==
- Jackie Coogan as Henry Peck / 'Peck's Bad Boy'
- Wheeler Oakman as Dr. Jack Martin, the Man in the Case
- Doris May as Letty Peck, Henry's Sister
- Raymond Hatton as The Village Grocer
- James Corrigan as George W. Peck, Henry's Pa
- Lillian Leighton as Mrs. George W. Peck, Henry's Ma
- Charles Hatton as Buddy, Henry's Pal
- K. T. Stevens as Henry's Sweetheart
- Dean Riesner
- Queenie the Dog as Tar Baby, Henry's Dog
- Robert Brower as The Minister (uncredited)

== Preservation ==
Prints of Peck's Bad Boy exists at the George Eastman House, Library of Congress, Museum of Modern Art, EYE Film Institute Netherlands, UCLA Film and Television Archive, and Academy Film Archive.
