= Stephen Seymour =

Set decorator

- Born: December 15, 1919; New York
- Died: June 20, 1973 (aged 53); Ventura, California
- Occupation: Set decorator
- Years active: 1940-1945

Stephen Seymour (December 15, 1919 – June 20, 1973) was an American set decorator. He was nominated for an Academy Award in the category Best Art Direction for the film Louisiana Purchase. He was born in New York and died in Ventura, California.

== Selected filmography ==
- Louisiana Purchase (1941)
