= 57th Academy Awards =

- Official poster
- Date: March 25, 1985
- Site: Dorothy Chandler Pavilion; Los Angeles, California, U.S.
- Hosted by: Jack Lemmon
- Produced by: Gregory Peck; Robert Wise; Larry Gelbart; Gene Allen
- Directed by: Marty Pasetta

Highlights
- Best Picture: Amadeus
- Most awards: Amadeus (8)
- Most nominations: Amadeus and A Passage to India (11)

TV in the United States
- Network: ABC
- Duration: 3 hours, 10 minutes
- Ratings: 38.9 million 27.7% (Nielsen ratings)

The 57th Academy Awards ceremony, organized by the Academy of Motion Picture Arts and Sciences (AMPAS), honored films released in 1984 and took place on March 25, 1985, at the Dorothy Chandler Pavilion in Los Angeles. During the ceremony, AMPAS presented Academy Awards (commonly referred to as Oscars) in 23 categories. The ceremony, televised in the United States by ABC, was produced by Gregory Peck, Robert Wise, Larry Gelbart, and Gene Allen, and was directed by Marty Pasetta. Actor Jack Lemmon hosted the show for the fourth time. He first co-hosted the 30th ceremony held in 1958, and had last co-hosted the 44th ceremony in 1972.

Amadeus won eight awards, including Best Picture. Other winners included The Killing Fields with three awards, A Passage to India and Places in the Heart with two, and Charade, Dangerous Moves, Indiana Jones and the Temple of Doom, Purple Rain, The Stone Carvers, The Times of Harvey Milk, Up, and The Woman in Red with one. The telecast was watched by an audience of 38.9 million viewers.

== Winners and nominees ==
The nominees for the 57th Academy Awards were announced on February 6, 1985, by Academy president Gene Allen and actress Eva Marie Saint. Amadeus and A Passage to India led all nominees with eleven each. The winners were announced at the awards ceremony on March 25. Haing S. Ngor was the first Asian winner for Best Supporting Actor. At age 77, Peggy Ashcroft became the oldest Best Supporting Actress winner. Best Original Song winner Stevie Wonder was the first blind person to win an Oscar. For the first time in Oscar history, all five nominees for Best Original Song had reached the number-one spot on the Billboard Hot 100 singles chart.

=== Awards ===
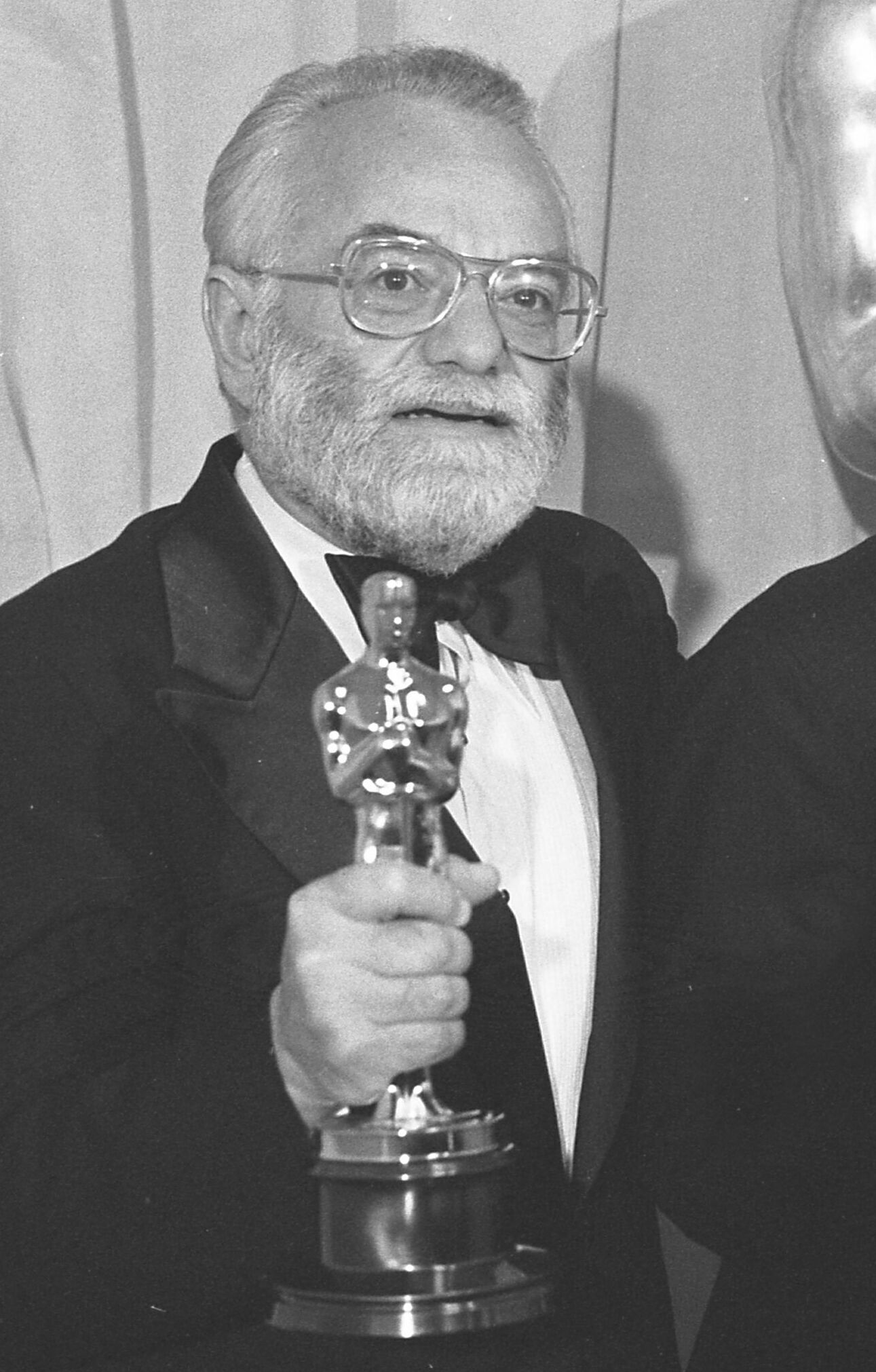
Saul Zaentz, Best Picture winner

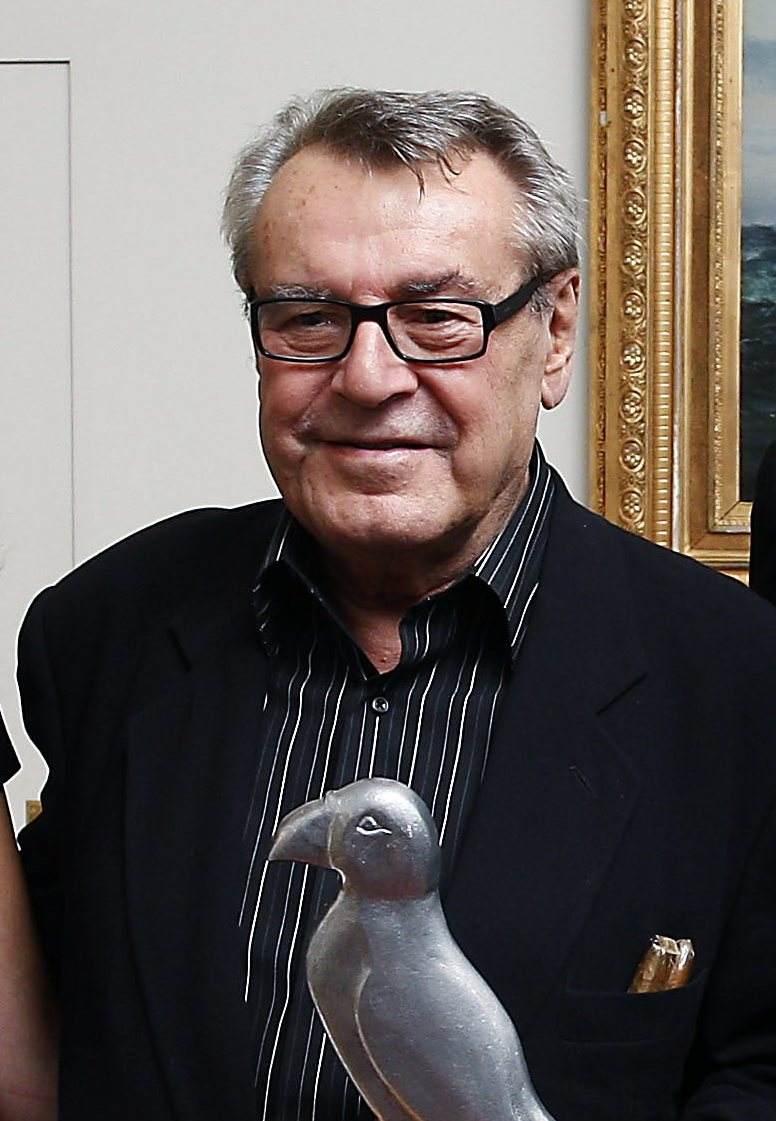
Miloš Forman, Best Director winner

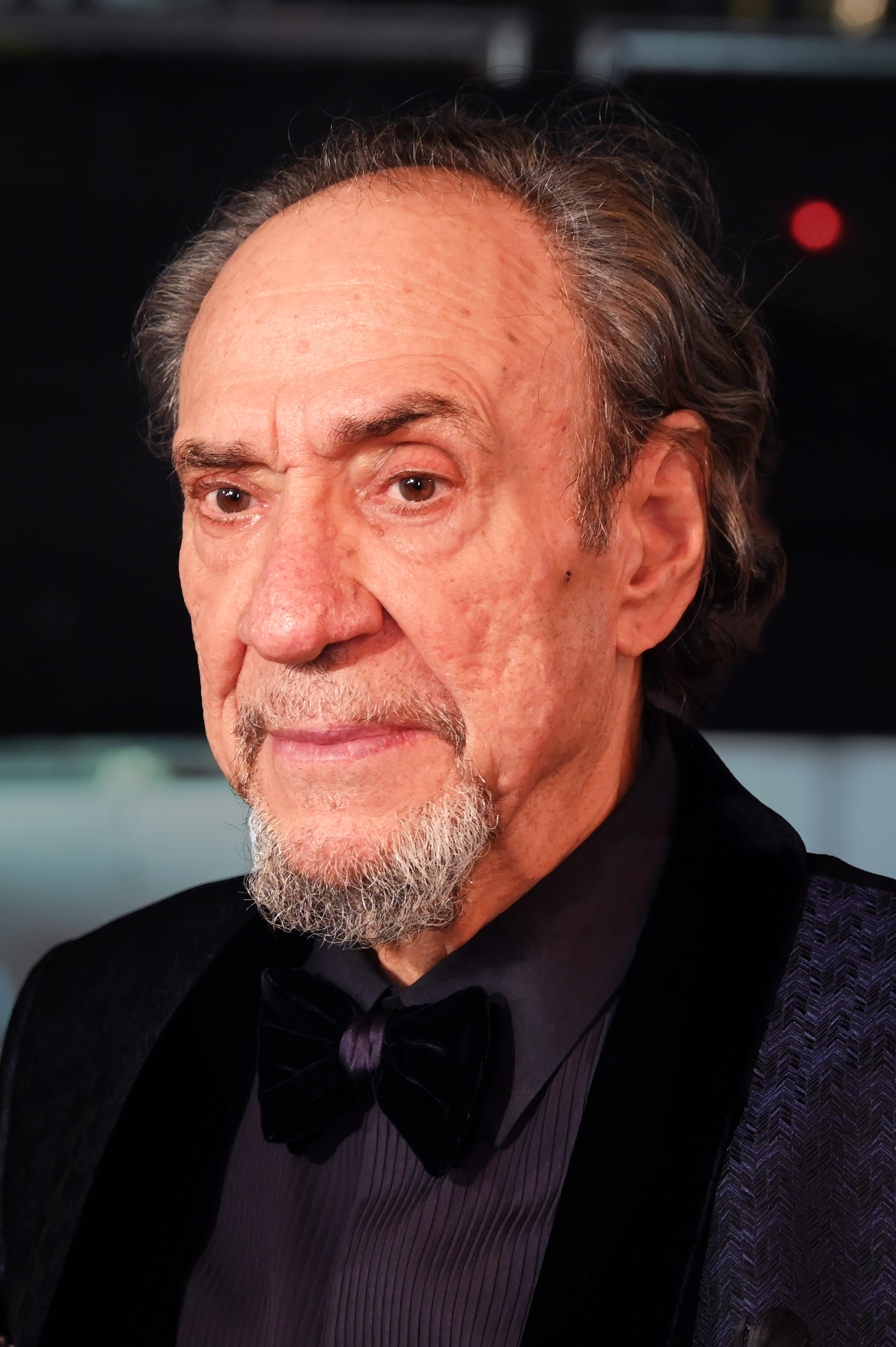
F. Murray Abraham, Best Actor winner

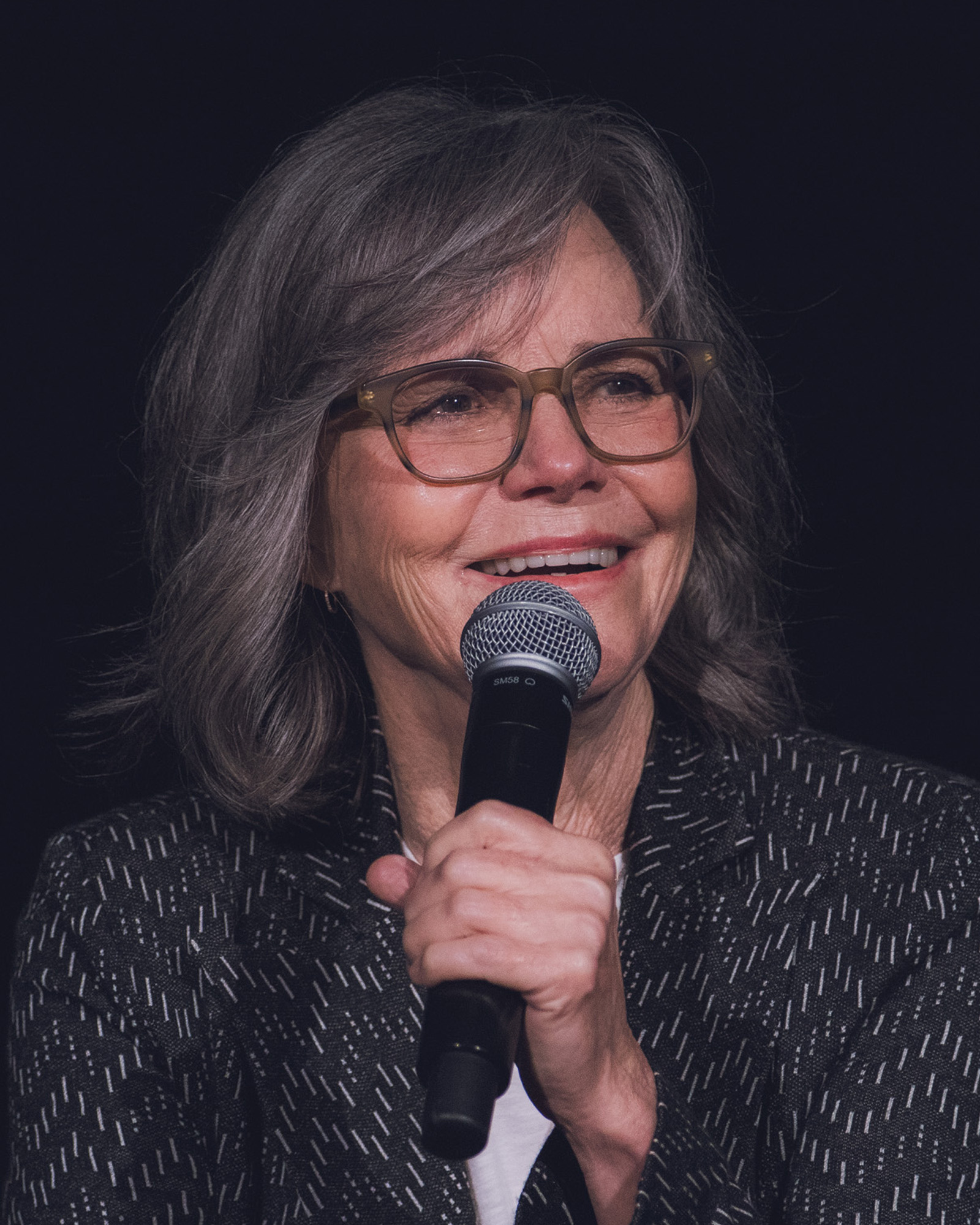
Sally Field, Best Actress winner

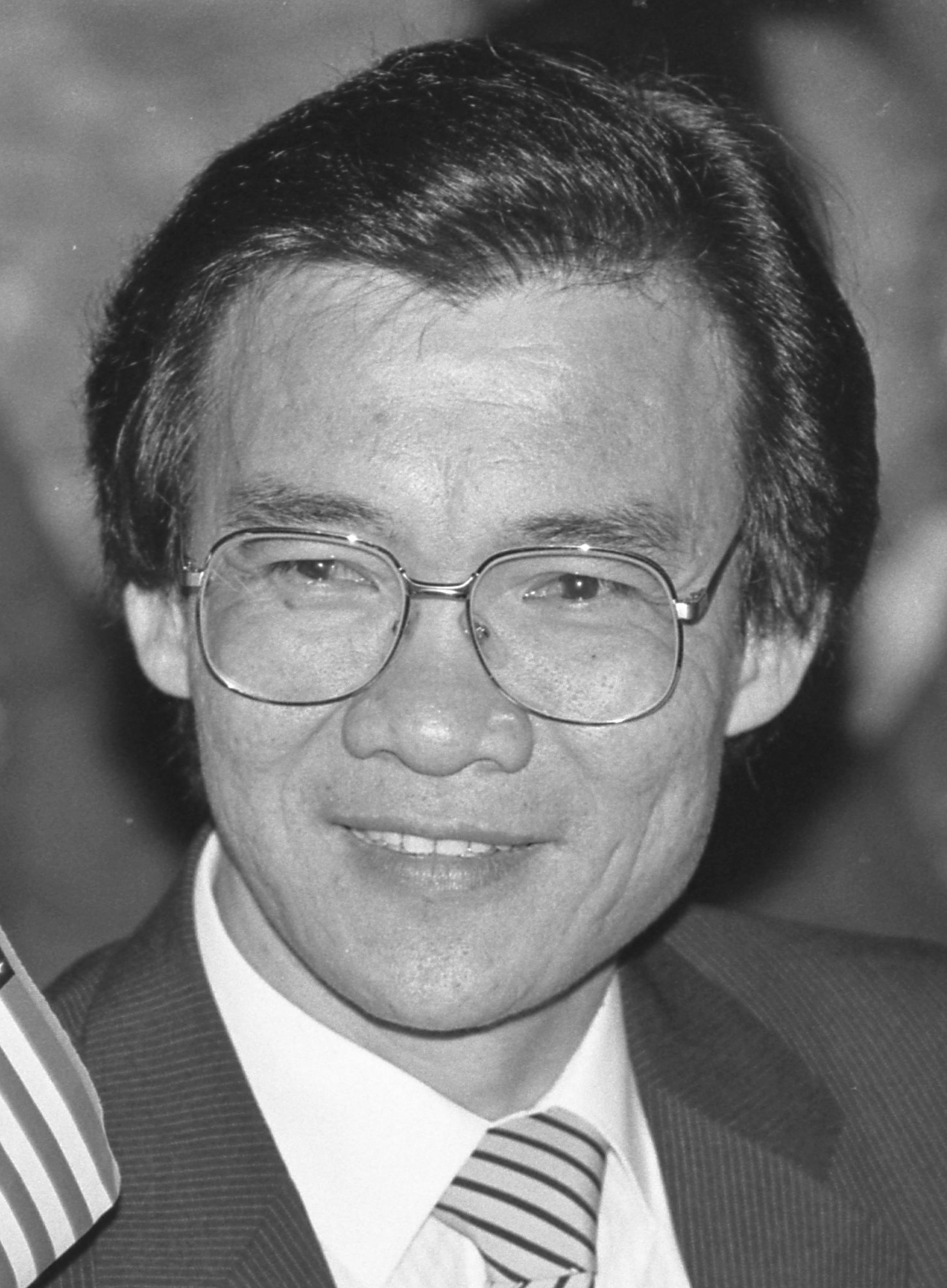
Haing S. Ngor, Best Supporting Actor winner

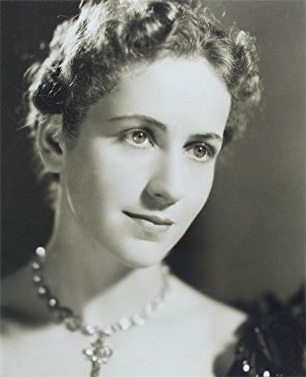
Peggy Ashcroft, Best Supporting Actress winner

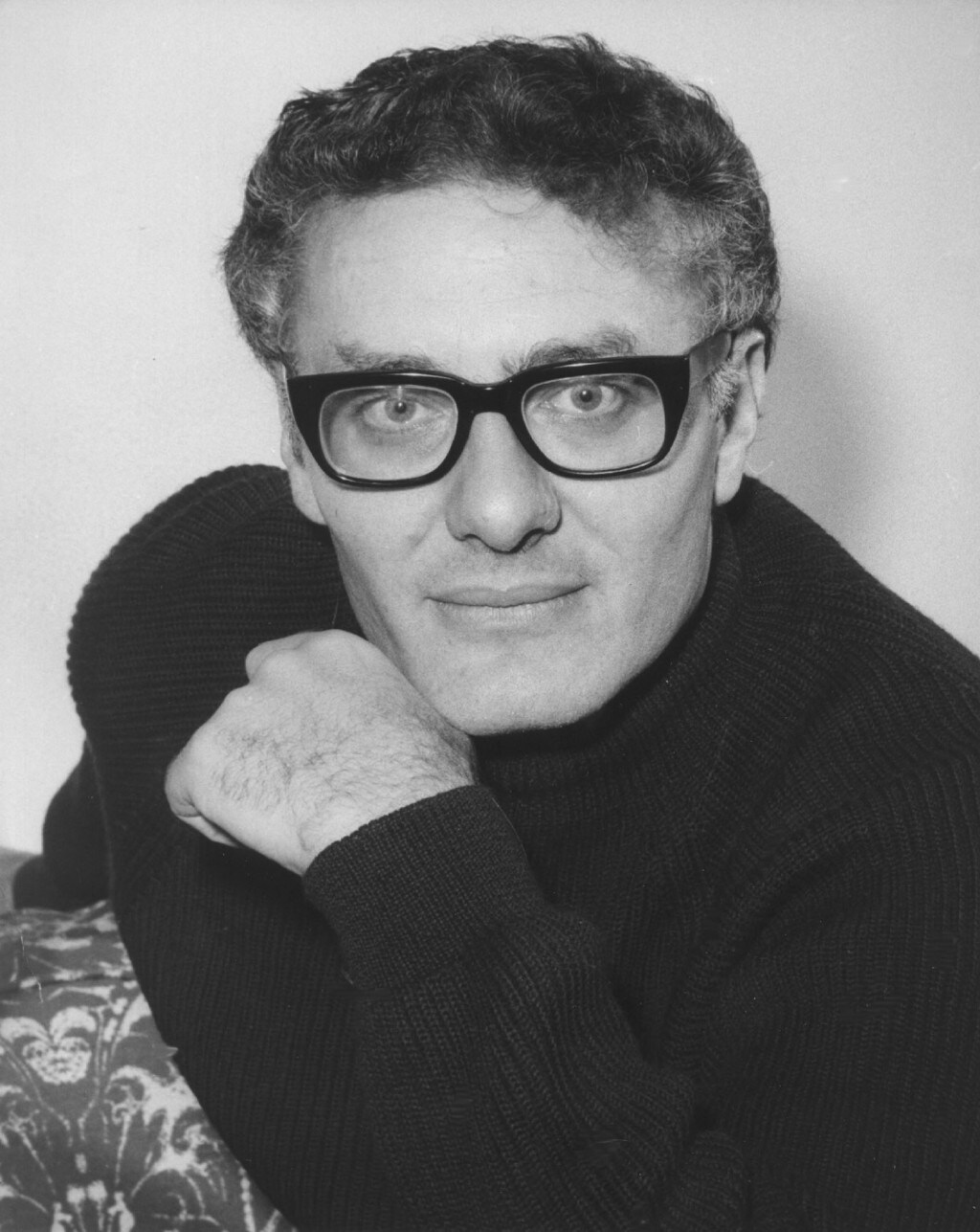
Peter Shaffer, Best Screenplay Based on Material from Another Medium winner

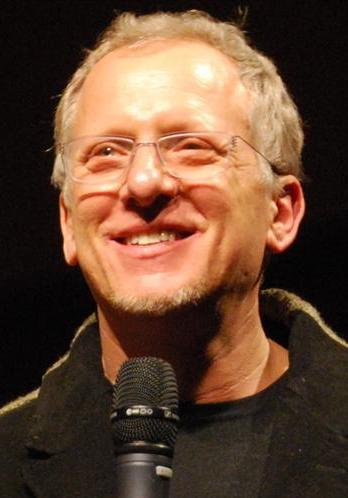
Rob Epstein, Best Documentary Feature co-winner

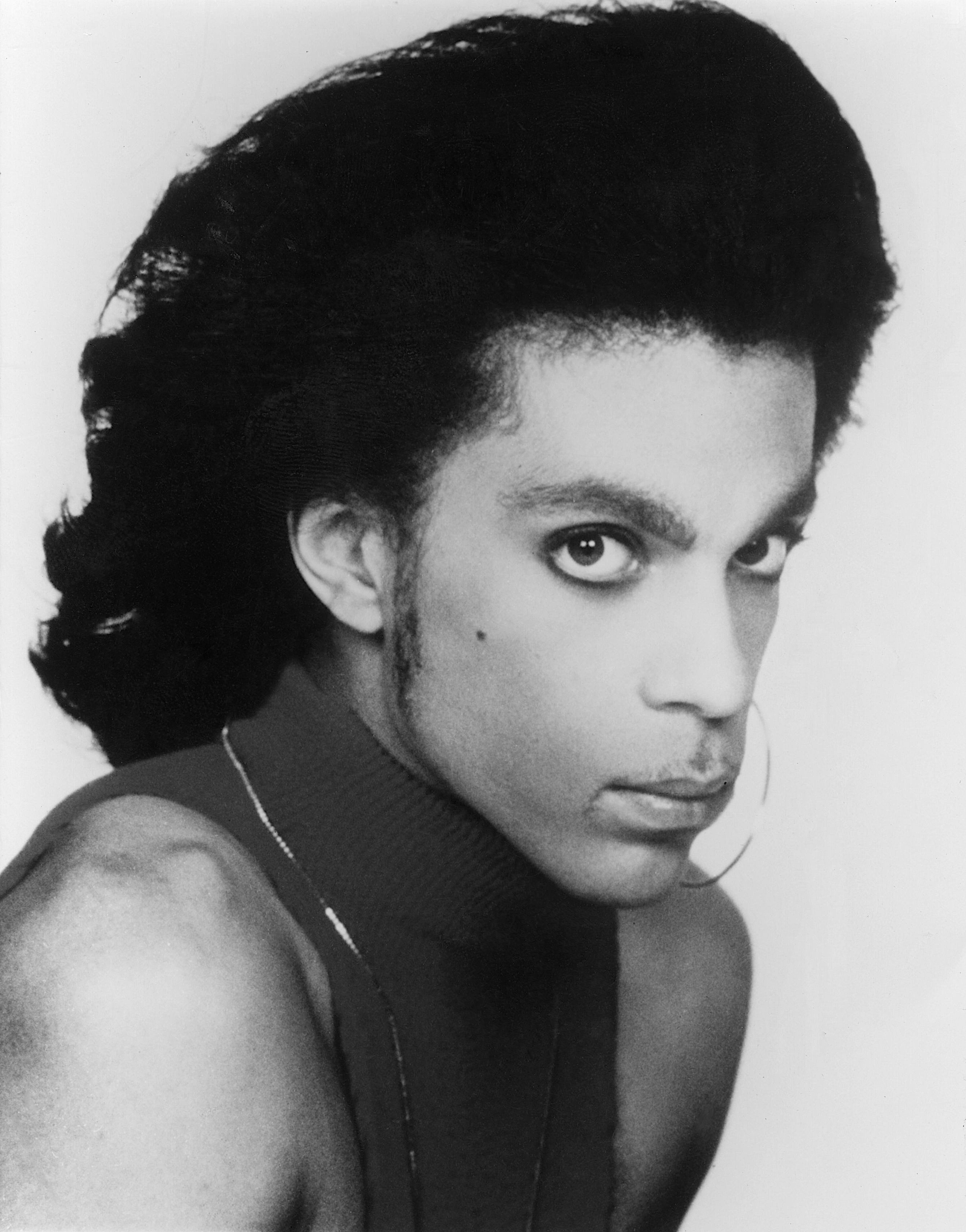
Prince, Best Original Song Score winner

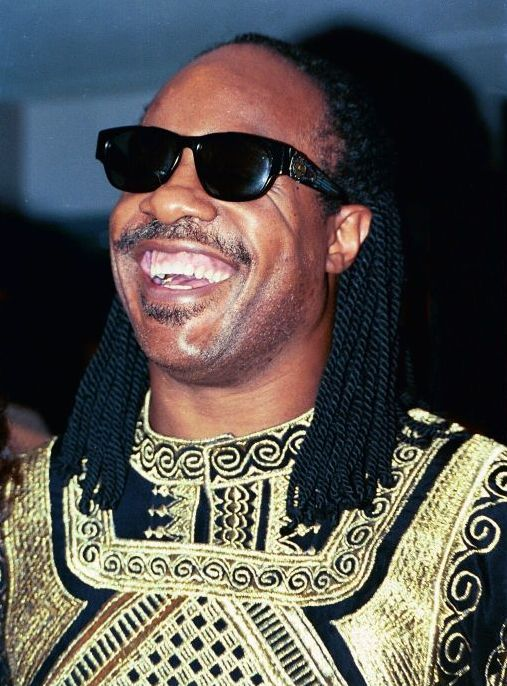
Stevie Wonder, Best Original Song winner

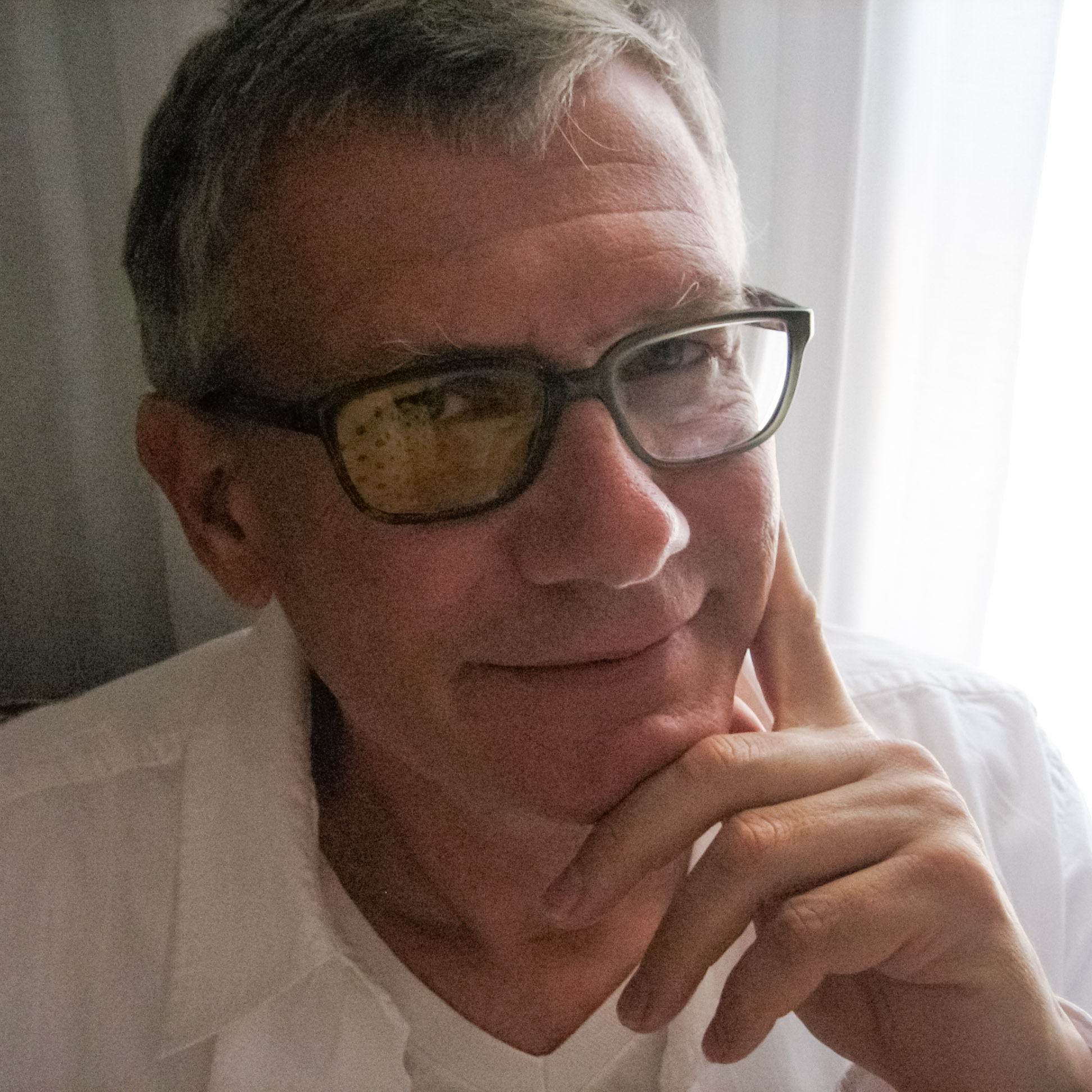
Todd Boekelheide, Best Sound co-winner

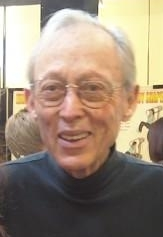
Dick Smith, Best Makeup co-winner

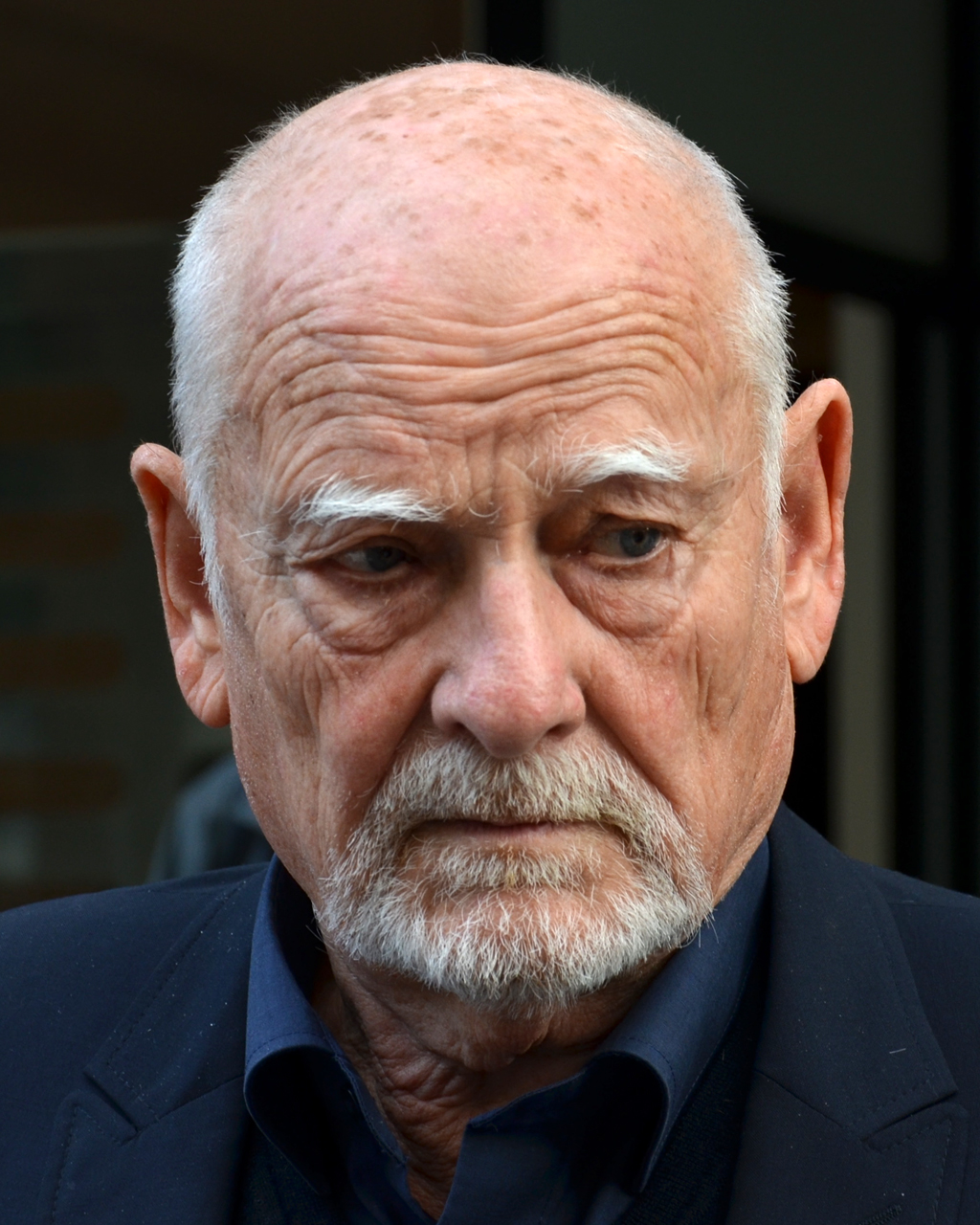
Theodor Pištěk, Best Costume Design winner

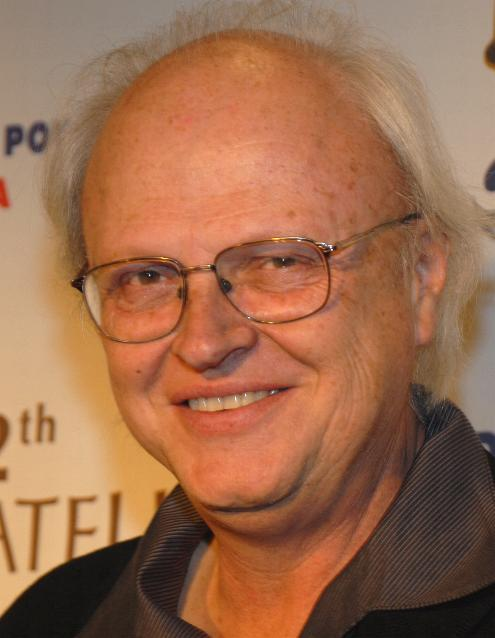
Dennis Muren, Best Visual Effects co-winner

Winners are listed first, highlighted in boldface and indicated with a double dagger (‡).

Table featuring winners and nominees of the 54th Academy Awards
**Best Picture**: **Amadeus – Saul Zaentz, producer**‡; The Killing Fields – David Puttnam, producer; A Passage to India – John Brabourne and Richard B. Goodwin, producers; Places in the Heart – Arlene Donovan, producer; A Soldier's Story – Norman Jewison, Ronald L. Schwary and Patrick Palmer, producers	**Best Directing**: **Miloš Forman – Amadeus**‡; Woody Allen – Broadway Danny Rose; Roland Joffé – The Killing Fields; David Lean – A Passage to India; Robert Benton – Places in the Heart
**Best Actor in a Leading Role**: **F. Murray Abraham – Amadeus as Antonio Salieri**‡; Jeff Bridges – Starman as Starman/Scott Hayden; Albert Finney – Under the Volcano as Geoffrey Firmin; Tom Hulce – Amadeus as Wolfgang Amadeus Mozart; Sam Waterston – The Killing Fields as Sydney Schanberg	**Best Actress in a Leading Role**: **Sally Field – Places in the Heart as Edna Spalding**‡; Judy Davis – A Passage to India as Adela Quested; Jessica Lange – Country as Jewell Ivy; Vanessa Redgrave – The Bostonians as Olive Chancellor; Sissy Spacek – The River as Mae Garvey
**Best Actor in a Supporting Role**: **Haing S. Ngor – The Killing Fields as Dith Pran**‡; Adolph Caesar – A Soldier's Story as Sgt. Waters; John Malkovich – Places in the Heart as Mr. Will; Pat Morita – The Karate Kid as Kesuke Miyagi; Ralph Richardson (posthumous nomination) – Greystoke: The Legend of Tarzan, Lord of the Apes as 6th Earl of Greystoke	**Best Actress in a Supporting Role**: **Peggy Ashcroft – A Passage to India as Mrs. Moore**‡; Glenn Close – The Natural as Iris Gaines; Lindsay Crouse – Places in the Heart as Margaret Lomax; Christine Lahti – Swing Shift as Hazel Zanussi; Geraldine Page – The Pope of Greenwich Village as Mrs. Ritter
**Best Writing (Screenplay Written Directly for the Screen)**: **Places in the Heart – Robert Benton**‡; Beverly Hills Cop – Screenplay by Daniel Petrie Jr.; Story by Danilo Bach and Daniel Petrie Jr.; Broadway Danny Rose – Woody Allen; El Norte – Gregory Nava and Anna Thomas; Splash – Screenplay by Lowell Ganz, Babaloo Mandel and Bruce Jay Friedman; Screen Story by Bruce Jay Friedman based on a story by Brian Grazer	**Best Writing (Screenplay Based on Material from Another Medium)**: **Amadeus – Peter Shaffer based on his play‡**; Greystoke: The Legend of Tarzan, Lord of the Apes – P. H. Vazak (Note: Robert Towne was credited as P. H. Vazak) and Michael Austin based on the novel Tarzan of the Apes by Edgar Rice Burroughs; The Killing Fields – Bruce Robinson based on the article "The Death and Life of Dith Pran" by Sydney Schanberg; A Passage to India – David Lean based on the novel by E. M. Forster; A Soldier's Story – Charles Fuller based on his play A Soldier's Play
**Best Foreign Language Film**: **Dangerous Moves (Switzerland) in French – directed by Richard Dembo**‡; Beyond the Walls (Israel) in Hebrew – directed by Uri Barbash; Camila (Argentina) in Spanish – directed by María Luisa Bemberg; Double Feature (Spain) in Spanish – directed by José Luis Garci; Wartime Romance (USSR) in Russian – directed by Pyotr Todorovsky	**Best Documentary (Feature)**: **The Times of Harvey Milk – Robert Epstein and Richard Schmiechen**‡; High Schools – Charles Guggenheim and Nancy Sloss; In the Name of the People – Alex W. Drehsler and Frank Christopher; Marlene – Karel Dirka and Zev Braun; Streetwise – Cheryl McCall
**Best Documentary (Short Subject)**: **The Stone Carvers – Marjorie Hunt and Paul Wagner**‡; The Children of Soong Ching Ling – Gary Bush and Paul T.K. Lin; Code Gray: Ethical Dilemmas in Nursing – Ben Achtenberg and Joan Sawyer; The Garden of Eden – Lawrence Hott and Roger Sherman; Recollections of Pavlovsk – Irina Kalinina	**Best Short Film (Live Action)**: **Up – Mike Hoover**‡; The Painted Door – Michael MacMillan and Janice L. Platt; Tales of Meeting and Parting – Sharon Oreck and Lesli Linka Glatter
**Best Short Film (Animated)**: **Charade – Jon Minnis**‡; Doctor De Soto – Morton Schindel and Michael Sporn; Paradise – Ishu Patel	**Best Music (Original Score)**: **A Passage to India – Maurice Jarre**‡; Indiana Jones and the Temple of Doom – John Williams; The Natural – Randy Newman; The River – John Williams; Under the Volcano – Alex North
**Best Music (Original Song Score)**: **Purple Rain – Prince**‡; The Muppets Take Manhattan – Jeff Moss; Songwriter – Kris Kristofferson	**Best Music (Original Song)**: **"I Just Called to Say I Love You" from The Woman in Red – Music and Lyrics by Stevie Wonder**‡; "Against All Odds (Take a Look at Me Now)" from Against All Odds – Music and Lyrics by Phil Collins; "Footloose" from Footloose – Music and Lyrics by Kenny Loggins and Dean Pitchford; "Ghostbusters" from Ghostbusters – Music and Lyrics by Ray Parker Jr.; "Let's Hear It for the Boy" from Footloose – Music and Lyrics by Dean Pitchford and Tom Snow
**Best Sound**: **Amadeus – Mark Berger, Tom Scott, Todd Boekelheide and Chris Newman**‡; 2010 – Michael J. Kohut, Aaron Rochin, Carlos Delarios and Gene Cantamessa; Dune – Bill Varney, Steve Maslow, Kevin O'Connell and Nelson Stoll; A Passage to India – Graham V. Hartstone, Nicolas Le Messurier, Michael A. Carter and John W. Mitchell; The River – Nick Alphin, Robert Thirlwell, Richard Portman and David M. Ronne	**Best Art Direction**: **Amadeus – Art Direction: Patrizia von Brandenstein; Set Decoration: Karel Černý**‡; 2010 – Art Direction: Albert Brenner; Set Decoration: Rick Simpson; The Cotton Club – Art Direction: Richard Sylbert; Set Decoration: George Gaines and Leslie Bloom; The Natural – Art Direction: Mel Bourne, Angelo P. Graham, James J. Murakami and Speed Hopkins; Set Decoration: Bruce Weintraub; A Passage to India – Art Direction: John Box and Leslie Tomkins; Set Decoration: Hugh Scaife
**Best Cinematography**: **The Killing Fields – Chris Menges**‡; Amadeus – Miroslav Ondříček; The Natural – Caleb Deschanel; A Passage to India – Ernest Day; The River – Vilmos Zsigmond	**Best Makeup**: **Amadeus – Dick Smith and Paul LeBlanc**‡; 2010 – Michael Westmore; Greystoke: The Legend of Tarzan, Lord of the Apes – Rick Baker and Paul Engelen
**Best Costume Design**: **Amadeus – Theodor Pištěk**‡; 2010 – Patricia Norris; The Bostonians – Jenny Beavan and John Bright; A Passage to India – Judy Moorcroft; Places in the Heart – Ann Roth	**Best Film Editing**: **The Killing Fields – Jim Clark**‡; Amadeus – Nena Danevic and Michael Chandler; The Cotton Club – Barry Malkin and Robert Q. Lovett; A Passage to India – David Lean; Romancing the Stone – Donn Cambern and Frank Morriss
**Best Visual Effects**: **Indiana Jones and the Temple of Doom – Dennis Muren, Michael J. McAlister, Lorne Peterson and George Gibbs**‡; 2010 – Richard Edlund, Neil Krepela, George Jenson and Mark Stetson; Ghostbusters – Richard Edlund, John Bruno, Mark Vargo and Chuck Gaspar

=== Special Achievement Award (Sound Effects Editing) ===
- The River – Kay Rose

=== Honorary Awards ===
- To James Stewart, for his fifty years of memorable performances. For his high ideals both on and off the screen. With the respect and affection of his colleagues.
- To the National Endowment for the Arts, in recognition of its 20th anniversary and its dedicated commitment to fostering artistic and creative activity and excellence in every area of the arts.

=== Jean Hersholt Humanitarian Award ===
The award recognizes individuals whose humanitarian efforts have brought credit to the motion picture industry.

- David L. Wolper

=== Films with multiple nominations and awards ===
Films with multiple nominations
Nominations	Film
11	Amadeus
11	A Passage to India
7	The Killing Fields
7	Places in the Heart
5	2010: The Year We Make Contact
4	The Natural
4	The River (Note: Not counting the non-competitive Special Achievement Award for The River.)
3	Greystoke: The Legend of Tarzan, Lord of the Apes
3	A Soldier's Story
2	The Bostonians
2	Broadway Danny Rose
2	The Cotton Club
2	Footloose
2	Ghostbusters
2	Indiana Jones and the Temple of Doom
2	Under the Volcano

Films with multiple wins
Awards	Film
8	Amadeus
3	The Killing Fields
2	A Passage to India
2	Places in the Heart

== Presenters and performers ==
The following persons, listed in order of appearance, presented awards or performed musical numbers.

=== Presenters ===
Table featuring presenters for the 53rd Academy Awards
Name(s)	Role
Hank Simms	Announcer of the 57th Academy Awards
Gene Allen (AMPAS President)	Gave opening remarks welcoming guests to the awards ceremony
Linda Hunt	Presenter of the award for Best Supporting Actor
Michael Douglas	Presenter of the award for Best Documentary Short
Kathleen Turner	Presenter of the award for Best Documentary Feature
Kelly LeBrock Lonette McKee	Presenters of the award for Best Makeup
Gregory Hines Amy Irving	Presenters of the award for Best Sound
Diana Ross Tom Selleck	Presenters of the award for Best Cinematography
Ryan O'Neal	Presenter of the award for Best Supporting Actress
Gene Kelly	Presenter of the Jean Hersholt Humanitarian Award to David L. Wolper
Steve Martin	Presenter of the award for Best Art Direction
Janet Leigh	Presenter of the Scientific & Technical Awards
Candice Bergen William Hurt	Presenters of the award for Best Visual Effects
Glenn Close	Presenter of the Honorary Award to the National Endowment for the Arts
Kirk Douglas Burt Lancaster	Presenters of the awards for Best Screenplay Written Directly for the Screen and Best Screenplay Based on Material from Another Medium
Jeff Bridges Ann Reinking	Presenters of the award for Best Original Score
Michael Douglas Kathleen Turner	Presenters of the award for Best Original Song Score
Jennifer Beals Glenn Close	Presenters of the award for Best Costume Design
Jeff Bridges Ann Reinking	Presenters of the award for Best Animated Short Film
Tom Selleck Kathleen Turner	Presenters of the award for Best Live Action Short Film
Shirley MacLaine	Presenter of the award for Best Actor
Gregory Hines	Presenter of the award for Best Original Song
Geneviève Bujold William Hurt	Presenters of the award for Best Film Editing
Cary Grant	Presenter of the Honorary Award to James Stewart
Plácido Domingo Faye Dunaway	Presenters of the award for Best Foreign Language Film
Steven Spielberg	Presenter of the award for Best Director
Robert Duvall	Presenter of the award for Best Actress
Laurence Olivier	Presenter of the award for Best Picture

=== Performers ===
Table featuring performers for the 53rd Academy Awards
Name	Role	Performed
Bill Conti	Musical director conductor	Orchestral
Ray Parker Jr. Dom DeLuise	Performers	"Ghostbusters" from Ghostbusters
Deniece Williams	Performer	"Let's Hear It for the Boy" from Footloose
Ann Reinking	Performer	"Against All Odds (Take a Look at Me Now)" from Against All Odds
Lonette McKee Willie Nelson Kris Kristofferson	Performers	"How Do You Feel about Foolin' Around?", "On the Road Again" "Amazing Grace"
Debbie Allen	Performer	"Footloose" from Footloose
Diana Ross	Performer	"I Just Called to Say I Love You" from The Woman in Red
Academy Awards Orchestra	Performers	"They Say It's Wonderful" (orchestral) from Annie Get Your Gun during the closing credits

== Ceremony information ==
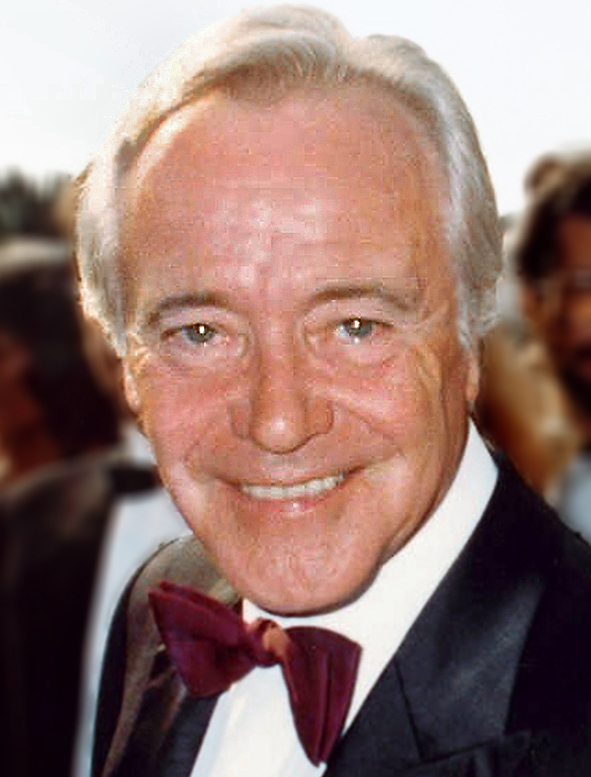
Jack Lemmon hosted the 57th Academy Awards.

Determined to revive interest surrounding the awards and reverse declining ratings, the Academy recruited a four-person committee in December 1984 composed of actor Gregory Peck, director Robert Wise, screenwriter Larry Gelbart, and AMPAS president Gene Allen to oversee producing duties. The following month, it was announced that actor Jack Lemmon would preside over emceeing duties for the 1985 ceremony. Allen explained the decision to hire Lemmon, saying, "Jack's untiring energy, zest for living, and imaginative talents have won respect and approval of everyone in the film community."

In an effort to shorten the ceremony, ten actors (Candice Bergen, Jeff Bridges, Glenn Close, Michael Douglas, Gregory Hines, Amy Irving, William Hurt, Diana Ross, Tom Selleck, and Kathleen Turner) were announced as "co-hosts" and served as either presenters announcing two awards each or introducing other presenters and musical numbers. In addition, producers warned nominees prior to the ceremony that winners would have 45 seconds to finish their speeches before a blinking red light would flash and the orchestra would begin playing them off.

Marty Pasetta directed the telecast; Bill Conti served as conductor and musical director. Oscar winner Theoni V. Aldredge served as costume designer for the ceremony which featured a segment showcasing the Best Costume Design nominees that included an elephant wearing costumes from A Passage to India. Scott Salmon served as choreography for the ceremony. In view of the Academy nominating movies reflecting life in the American heartland such as Places in the Heart, The River, and Songwriter, singers Willie Nelson, Kris Kristofferson, and Lonette McKee performed a medley of country songs.

=== Box office performance of Best Picture nominees ===
At the time of the nominations announcement on February 6, the combined gross of the five Best Picture nominees at the US box office was $103 million. Places in the Heart was the highest earner among the Best Picture nominees, with $31.2 million in domestic box office receipts. The film was followed by Amadeus ($25.7 million), A Soldier's Story ($21.4 million), A Passage to India ($13.5 million), and The Killing Fields ($11.7 million).

=== Critical reviews ===
Television critic Howard Rosenberg of the Los Angeles Times wrote, "The Oscar telecast was born to bore. It's unethical to tamper with failure. It's unholy. It's criminal. Now look what's happened. The Oscar telecast is good." He also noted that shortened acceptance speeches and well-disciplined production numbers made for a brisk-paced ceremony. Jerry Coffey of the Fort Worth Star-Telegram commented, "Monday night's Academy Awards show was the best in recent memory, a snappy, disciplined event that sacrificed nothing of value and trimmed off much of the obligatory baggage and extraneous clutter." He also commended Lemmon's performance as host while also singling out James Stewart's Honorary Oscar acceptance speech as one of the emotional highlights of the night. The Sacramento Bee's George Williams said, "It was a classy show all the way, a pure Hollywood production. Jack Lemmon, a two-time Oscar winner himself, was at the helm with his consummate timing and irresistible likableness."

Chicago Tribune television columnist Jon Anderson wrote, "Like a whale on a diet, Monday night's 57th Academy Awards ceremony on ABC-TV Channel 7 was leaner and trimmer than past shows, but seemed to have lost something. The show, still fat, lacked spirit." He reserved praise particularly for the Best Costume Design presentation and presenter Steve Martin, but compared host Lemmon's hosting performance as "luncheon-club amiability" to previous year's host Johnny Carson's "Las Vegas sharpness." Michael Dougan of the San Francisco Examiner remarked, "Last night's extravaganza was more than 30 minutes shorter than the 1984 event, but not because the audience got less to look at." He criticized the decision to cut off various winners' speeches and several technical production errors such as flashing the Amadeus logo when The Killing Fields won Best Cinematography. Harold Schindler, writing for The Salt Lake Tribune, said despite the ceremony's shorter runtime, "It wasn't noticeably better, but it did provide plenty a copy for a TV bloopers and outtakes or a segment in 'Life's Most Embarrassing Moments' if ABC cares to use it someday."

=== Ratings and reception ===
The American telecast on ABC drew in an audience of 38.9 million, which was a smaller figure compared to last year's audience. The show also garnered lower Nielsen ratings compared to the previous ceremony, with 27.7% of households watching with a 45% share. Nevertheless, the ceremony presentation received two nominations at the 37th Primetime Emmy Awards in August 1984. The following month, the ceremony won one of those nominations for Outstanding Art Direction for a Variety Program (Rene Lagler and Jeremy Railton).

== See also ==
- List of submissions to the 57th Academy Awards for Best Foreign Language Film

== Sources ==
- Franks, Don (2005), Entertainment Awards: A Music, Cinema, Theatre and Broadcasting Guide, 1928 Through 2003 (3rd ed.), Jefferson, North Carolina, United States: McFarland & Company, ISBN 978-1-4766-0806-8, OCLC 1475140428
- Osborne, Robert (2013). 85 Years of the Oscar: The Complete History of the Academy Awards. New York, New York, United States: Abbeville Publishing Group. ISBN 978-0-7892-1142-2. OCLC 856879222.
- Terrance, Vincent (2013), Television Specials: 5,336 Entertainment Programs, 1936–2012 (5 ed.), Jefferson, North Carolina, United States: Ballantine Books, McFarland & Company, ISBN 978-1-4766-1240-9, OCLC 844373010
- Wiley, Mason; Bona, Damien (1996), Inside Oscar: The Unofficial History of the Academy Awards (5 ed.), New York, New York, United States: Ballantine Books, ISBN 978-0-3454-0053-6, OCLC 779680732
