= Beverly Johnson (climber) =

American film maker, rock climber and adventurer

- Johnson with a video camera, roped to a rockface (Mike Hoover)

Personal information
- Born: April 22, 1947 Annapolis, Maryland
- Died: April 3, 1994 (aged 46) Ruby Mountains, Nevada
- Height: 5 ft 5 in (165 cm) (1979)
- Weight: 120 lb (54 kg) (1979)

Climbing career
- First ascents: Grape Race, El Capitan (with Charlie Porter)
- Known for: first woman to solo Dihedral wall, El Capitan; first all female climb of El Capitan (with Sibylle Hetchel)

Beverly Johnson (22 April 1947 – 3 April 1994) was a pioneering rock climber and adventurer.

== Early life ==
Johnson was born in Annapolis, Maryland and as the daughter of a Navy Officer travelled significantly in her early years. They settled in Arlington, Virginia and she attended Yorktown High School, graduating in 1965, later attending Kent State University where she trekked with the mountaineering club and the University of Southern California. After graduating from college her first job was making parkas in Sun Valley, Idaho later doing cross country ski instructing. Later she moved to Yosemite working on firefighting and search and rescue she was the first woman to lead a firefighter crew in Yosemite. She was also the first person to paddle an open kayak alone through the Strait of Magellan.

== Climbing ==
At the age of 24, Beverly Johnson was already an established member of the Camp-4 community in Yosemite in 1971. She was part of the first all female climb of El Capitan with Sibylle Hechtel and the first woman to solo climb Dihedral wall of El Capitan over a period of 10 days in October 1978.

Johnson first met her future husband Mike Hoover in about 1967 when he accidentally hit her with a rope whilst climbing different routes in Yosemite but they fell in love on a climbing expedition to Venezuela. They climbed Mt. Vinson in Antarctica for their honeymoon.

She was the leader of a six-member female team who parachuted into the New Guinean highlands and climbed back out, filmed by Hoover.

== Other activities ==
Johnson participated in many adventurous activities, many of them firsts including being the first person to solo cross the Straits of Magellan in open kayak. She also skied across Greenland and windsurfed across Bering Straits.

Johnson flew fixed-winged planes and helicopters and was the first person to pilot an autogyro in Antarctica.

Both Johnson and her husband were makers of award-winning documentaries, Hoover winning an Academy Award in 1984 for Up. The couple also explored and filmed around the Palmer Peninsula in Antarctica using dog sleds. They were both filmcrew on the 1979 Transglobe Exhibition which circumnavigated the globe via the poles. Johnson and Hoover filmed the war in Afghanistan in the 1980s.

== Death ==
Johnson was an advanced skier and was on a two-day heli-ski trip in the Ruby Mountains in 1994. The helicopters returned to take the party back off the mountain in bad weather; Johnson's 206B3 Jet Ranger helicopter had to land and wait two hours for the storm to subside. After taking off again, the helicopter developed engine trouble and crashed in Thorpe Creek Canyon, around five miles south of Lamoille. Johnson was killed and her husband Mike Hoover was critically injured in the same crash but survived. The pilot, Dave Walton, and Disney president Frank Wells were also killed in the crash. Hoover later sued the helicopter manufacturer and reached an out-of-court settlement due to a fault with the engine design relating to snow ingestion. The legal case was a finalist for the Steven J. Sharp Public Service Award by the American Association for Justice.
