= 1985 Academy Awards =

1985 Academy Awards may refer to:

- 57th Academy Awards, the Academy Awards ceremony that took place in 1985
- 58th Academy Awards, the 1986 ceremony honoring the best in film for 1985
