= Roger Sherman (filmmaker) =

American filmmaker

Roger M. Sherman is an American filmmaker – a cinematographer, director, producer, still photographer, and author best known for his work in documentary cinema. He is a founder of Florentine Films. His most widely recognized documentaries are Alexander Calder (1998), Richard Rogers: The Sweetest Sounds (2001), Don't Divorce the Children (1989), Medal of Honor (2008), The Restaurateur (2010), Zapruder and Stolley: Witness to an Assassination (2011), his two-hour PBS special, The Search for Israeli Cuisine, The Rhythm of My Soul (2006), and The American Brew (2007). His films have won an Emmy Award, a Peabody Award, and two Academy Award nominations, among other honors.

== Early life and education ==
Sherman was born to mother, Ray Morris Sherman and father, Lee Sherman, the second of three sons. Ray founded a day camp for learning disabled children in Westchester that she ran as a volunteer for over a decade, and Lee was in the women's all-weather coat business.

Sherman attended Hunter College Elementary school until age seven, when his family moved to Scarsdale, New York. Sherman graduated from Scarsdale High School in 1969.

He attended Union College (1969-1971), majoring in political science and experimental education, played freshman soccer, and spent a semester in Bogotá, Colombia where he studied Spanish. He left Union and went to Denmark for his junior year abroad at The University of Copenhagen, Denmark. He studied architecture and history that fall and moved to Val-d'Isère, France, where he worked that winter at a hotel at the base of La Daille lift and a restaurant on top of the mountain. After returning from his year abroad, he attended Hampshire College, in Amherst, Massachusetts, where he graduated in 1975 with a Bachelor of Arts degree in film and photography.

== Career ==
In 1976, a year after graduating from Hampshire, Sherman and college roommate, Ken Burns, along with another friend from Hampshire College, Buddy Squires, founded Florentine Films. They started by working as a New England crew for companies filming in the region. At the time when magazine shows were beginning to launch, the team worked for RAI/Italian television, the BBC, Danish television, French television, etc. and marketed themselves across New England. They were soon joined by their fourth partner, Lawrence Hott. They provide crew for documentaries for such films as Emily Dickinson and Herman Melville, shot a feature and worked on commercials. He began as a location sound recordist, then an assistant director and producer on commercials, producer/director on documentaries and also became a cinematographer.

In 1981, the company released its major film, The Brooklyn Bridge, directed by Ken Burns and produced by Burns, Sherman, and Buddy Squires. It was nominated for an Academy Award. A few films later, each of the four partners wanted to create work individually; they each launched separate brands under the same trade name, Florentine Films.

Of Sherman's many films, The Restaurateur, a portrait of renowned restaurant owner, Danny Meyer, won the 2013 James Beard Award for Best Documentary, Broadcast Journalism. His Emmy Award- and Peabody Award-winning film, Alexander Calder, is "an American masterpiece", said Charlie Rose. Richard Rogers: The Sweetest Sounds was declared, "An extraordinary film biography, perhaps the best ever produced in the American Masters series" by Dorothy Rabinowitz of The Wall Street Journal. Medal of Honor received appraisal from the New York Post, which reads, "An astounding array of stories about an unbelievable collection of unexpected heroes". His film, Don't Divorce the Children, about the effects of divorce on children, became a mandatory viewing in many states for families going through divorce.

Sherman photography has been published in Newsweek, Saveur, Town and Country, Town and Country Travel and Budget Travel magazines; he also photographed The Brisket Book by Stephanie Pierson. His own book, Ready, Steady, Shoot: The Guide to Great Home Video, was written to help individuals and families everywhere improve the content of their home videos. An update of that book, being sold as an enhanced eBook is called Ready, Steady, Shoot: A Pro's Guide to Smartphone Video, published by Florentine Films/Sherman Pictures, 2012.

In 2016 Florentine Films/Sherman Pictures released In Search of Israeli Cuisine, a portrait of the Israeli people - told through food, conflict and all. The chef/guide is chef/restaurateur Michael Solomonov The film captures the political culture of the country of Israel during its major culinary revolution. He takes viewers on a culinary adventure to over 100 locations throughout Israel, visiting top chefs, great home cooks, amazing wine and cheese makers, street food vendors, farmers, and much more. The world premiere was held at the Palm Springs International Film Festival, where it sold out the largest theater twice. It was also shown at the Miami Jewish Film Festival, the San Francisco Jewish Film Festival, and The Atlanta Jewish Film Festival at Symphony Hall to 1200 people; it was the closing night film. In all, the film was shown at over 60 International film festivals and special screenings, in 38 theaters across the U.S. and Canada, and on Netflix.

In 2019 The Second Life of Jamie P was released. It tells the story of Jamie Peebles, who always thought he was a man. Until, "like a bolt of lightning," at age 63, she realized she's a woman. Roger followed her emotional, revelatory and often funny transition for a year. He filmed major milestones, like Jamie's confirmation surgery, as well as scenes with her daughters Angie and Tina, Elaine, her ex-wife, Nick, her future son-in-law, and Carol, a transgender friend who helped Jamie navigate her transition. Carol shares her personal and emotional story as well.

The New Face of Israeli Cuisine, an in-person and virtual event, was launched in 2020. With so many scenes not included in In Search of Israeli Cuisine, Roger created an hour-long conversation. He shows a scene (most were not included in the film) then discusses it with the audience, taking their questions, hearing their stories. The event was presented to groups across the country including Central Synagogue in New York City and Westchester Reform Temple in Scarsdale, NY. Chief rabbi Jonathan Blake praised the film saying, "Roger brought wit, warmth, and a wealth of knowledge about exciting new directions in Israeli cuisine. Our congregation left hungry for more." He was the keynote speaker at The Jewish Communities of Vermont Summit, where he presented the talk. At the El Paso Jewish Film Festival tickets sold so quickly, they added another show. The event was the best attended at the festival. It was the last in-person event Roger presented as the COVID-19 pandemic shut everything down; three events scheduled in Canada were cancelled. That's when the virtual event was created.

In 2021 The Soul of A Farmer will be released. It's a portrait of Patty Gentry, a smart, passionate, funny chef turned farmer. Roger followed filmed the 2016-2017 season at Patty's Early Girl Farm in Brookhaven, Long Island, New York, and returned in 2019 to see if the changes Patty instituted worked. The film bursts the romance of farm-to-table. Patty rents her land from the international actor and activist Isabella Rossellini, who says, "Patty is the Picasso of vegetables." And, "She reminds me of my mother, the famous actress Ingrid Bergman both so energetic." Patty sells to renowned chef/restaurateurs in Brooklyn and Long Island: Missy Robbins (Lilia, Missi), Souhi Kim (The Good Fork, Insa, Gage and Tollner), (Marlow and Sons, Marlow and Daughters, Romans), Christian Mir (Stone Creek Inn).

== Photography ==
Sherman has photographed for Town & Country Magazine, Saveur, Budget Travel, Garden Design, Metropolitan Home, and Newsweek. He photographed The Brisket Book: A Love Story with Recipes, by Stephanie Pierson, (2011).

== Awards and honors ==
- 1981 Oscar nomination for Brooklyn Bridge
- 1984 nomination, Academy Award for The Garden of Eden
- 1998 Peabody Award for Alexander Calder
- 1998 Emmy Award for Alexander Calder
- 2013 James Beard Award for The Restaurateur

Sherman is a recipient of numerous awards, including two Academy Award nominations, an Emmy, and a Peabody.

His 2010 film, The Restaurateur is the winner of the 2013 James Beard Award, Best Food Documentary of the 2010 Sonoma International Film Festival, Best Documentary of the 2010 Big Apple Film Festival, and Best Documentary of the 2010 Double Feature Film Festival.

== Personal life ==
Sherman lives in New York City with his wife, Dorothy Kalins, founding editor-in-chief of Metropolitan Home magazine and Saveur magazine. They have a son, Lincoln Sherman.

== Selected filmography ==
- Brooklyn Bridge (film) (1981)
- Fast Eddie and the Boys (1982)
- The Garden of Eden (1984 film) (1984)
- A Dream House(1991)
- Yo soy Boricua, pa'que tu lo sepas! (film) (2006)
