= Frank Wells =

American film studio executive (1932–1994)

President of The Walt Disney Company
- In office 1984 – 1994
- Preceded by: Ron W. Miller
- Succeeded by: Michael Ovitz

COO of The Walt Disney Company
- In office 1984 – 1994
- Preceded by: Ron W. Miller
- Succeeded by: Sanford Litvack

Personal details
- Born: Franklin G. Wells; March 4, 1932 Coronado, California, U.S.
- Died: April 3, 1994 (aged 62) Lamoille, Nevada, U.S.
- Cause of death: Helicopter crash
- Resting place: Forest Lawn Memorial Park, Hollywood Hills, Los Angeles, California, U.S.
- Spouse: Luanne Cosgrave (m. 1956)
- Children: 2
- Education: Pomona College; University of Oxford; Stanford Law School (LLB)
- Occupation: President, The Walt Disney Company

Franklin Godfrey Wells (March 4, 1932 – April 3, 1994) was an American businessman who served as president and chief operating officer of The Walt Disney Company from 1984 until his death in 1994.

== Life and career ==
Wells was born in Coronado, California and traced his ancestry back to the Mayflower. He attended Pomona College, which he left as Phi Beta Kappa in 1953. Wells was a recipient of a Rhodes Scholarship, through which he obtained a BA at Oxford University. He went into the army for two years as an infantry first lieutenant and then graduated from Stanford Law School and became a lawyer.

Before his tenure with Disney, Wells had worked for Warner Bros. as its West Coast vice president in 1969, then in 1973 as president, and in 1977 as vice chairman until he left the company in 1982.

Disney directors Roy E. Disney, Stanley Gold and Sid Bass had ousted President and CEO Ron W. Miller in 1984. The Disney board then recruited Wells to become Disney's president and chief operating officer (1984–1994), along with Michael Eisner as chairman and CEO, and Jeffrey Katzenberg as head of Walt Disney Studios. Wells was unique among the management troika in that he had the highest academic achievement. Although the number-two executive at Disney, Wells reported to the board of directors and not to Eisner.

=== Seven Summits ===
Wells was an avid alpinist and came close to achieving his goal of climbing the Seven Summits, the highest mountains on each of the seven continents. Only Everest eluded him, as bad weather had forced his party to descend when just 3,000 feet from the summit. His partner in the Seven Summits attempt, Dick Bass, an entrepreneur who developed the Snowbird ski resort in Utah, later made it up all seven peaks, the first man to do so. At the Matterhorn Bobsleds attraction at Disneyland, Wells' love of mountain climbing is honored with exploration equipment emblazoned with the words "Wells Expedition," which can be seen during the ride's downhill descent, as well as on a window on Main Street USA honoring him.

== Personal life ==
On March 29, 1956, Wells married Luanne Cosgrave. They had two children. The couple remained married until Wells' death in 1994. Luanne died on July 15, 2021 at the age of 87.

=== Death ===
Wells was killed in a helicopter crash on April 3, 1994 while returning from a heliskiing trip in Nevada's Ruby Mountains. Pilot Dave Walton and rock climber Beverly Johnson were also killed in the crash. He was a good friend of Clint Eastwood, who had been skiing with Wells that weekend. Eastwood left in his own helicopter just an hour before Wells' departure. Because of poor weather in the area, the chartered Bell 206 helicopter carrying Wells had landed at a remote location about two and a half hours prior to the crash. While waiting for improved weather conditions, snow fell on the helicopter. During the subsequent takeoff and ascent, the engine lost power and the aircraft crashed on a 30-degree slope, followed by a rollover during an attempted emergency landing. The National Transportation Safety Board determined that the probable cause of the accident was "the ingestion of foreign material (snow) in the engine, which resulted in a flameout (loss of engine power)." Of the five persons on board, four were killed. The sole survivor was Mike Hoover.

Wells was buried at Forest Lawn - Hollywood Hills Cemetery. At the funeral, Eastwood sang a tribute of The Beatles' "Hey Jude", which Wells liked to sing on the slopes. The Lion King, which came out the summer after Wells' death, includes a dedication right before the Walt Disney Pictures logo appears (though the 2003 Platinum Edition, the 2011 Diamond Edition and the 2017 Signature Edition have the dedication at the end of the credits). The building housing the Walt Disney Archives at Walt Disney Studios was also named in Wells' honor. Additionally, the Matterhorn Bobsleds attraction at Disneyland added a tribute to Wells, featuring a crate inside of a crystal cavern with the text "Wells Expedition" inscribed on it.

== Sources ==
- McGilligan, Patrick (1999). Clint: The Life and Legend. HarperCollins. ISBN 0-00-638354-8.

Business positions
| Preceded by Ron W. Miller | Disney COO; 1984–1994 | Succeeded by Sanford Litvack |
| Preceded by Ron W. Miller | Disney President; 1984–1994 | Succeeded by Michael Ovitz |
