= Mike Hoover =

American mountain climber

Mike Hoover is an American mountaineer, rock climber and cinematographer. He first became known for an Academy Award-nominated documentary short, Solo, in which he climbed a fictional mountain solo, as well as his Oscar award for Best Short Subject at the 57th Academy Awards for his 14 minute film Up in 1984. His first major involvement in commercial film was with The Eiger Sanction (1975), in which he taught Clint Eastwood how to climb in the Yosemite valley before the film was shot in Grindelwald, Switzerland in 1974. Hoover has since been a cinematographer for the documentaries To the Ends of the Earth (1983), To the Limit (1989), The Endless Summer II (1994) and Zion Canyon: Treasure of the Gods. In the late 1980s, he made 18 trips to Afghanistan to shoot war footage that was later featured in a program named The Battle for Afghanistan (1987). Hoover has led various film teams all over the world, particularly in physically and politically difficult locations, such as Everest, K2, the precarious rock faces of the Eiger and the Venezuelan jungle.

In 1994, Hoover was the sole survivor in a helicopter crash in Lamoille, Nevada that killed his wife Beverly Johnson, pilot Dave Walton, ski guide Paul Scannell and Disney president Frank Wells. The National Transportation Safety Board concluded that the accident was caused by snow ingestion into the helicopter's engine, and Hoover sued the helicopter manufacturer, reaching an out-of-court settlement. The legal case was a finalist for the Steven J. Sharp Public Service Award by the American Association for Justice.

== Bibliography ==
- McGilligan, Patrick (1999). Clint: The Life and Legend. London: HarperCollins. ISBN 0-00-638354-8.
- Schickel, Richard (1996). Clint Eastwood: A Biography. New York: Knopf. ISBN 978-0-679-42974-6 – via Internet Archive.
