= Paul Lin Ta-kuang =

Chinese-Canadian political scientist (1920–2004)

- Born: March 14, 1920; Vancouver, British Columbia
- Died: July 4, 2004 (aged 84)
- Education: University of Michigan; Harvard University
- Occupations: Political scientist, Peace Activist
- Spouse: Eileen Siu-Tsung Chen (1924–2024)
- Children: Christopher (1945-1966); Douglas (1949-, aged 66)
- Parent(s): George Lim Yuen (Lin Zuoran) (1882-1967); Chiu Mon Som (1882-1938)
- Relatives: David 林達偉 (brother); Andrew 林達文 (brother, married Pearl Sun Sui Ying 孫穗英 (1922–2025) Sun Yat-sen's granddaughter)

Paul Lin Ta-kuang (simplified Chinese: 林达光; traditional Chinese: 林達光; pinyin: Lín Dáguāng; Wade–Giles: Lin Ta-kuang (March 14, 1920 – July 4, 2004) was a Canadian-Chinese political scientist and peace activist, the founding Director of McGill's Center for East Asian Studies (1965-1982) and Rector of the University of East Asia in Macau (now Macau University) from 1986 to 1988.

== Biography ==
=== Youth in Canada ===
Lin is the son of George Lim Yuen (Lin Zuoran, 林佐然) (1882-1967) and Chiu Mon Som (1882-1938, 趙文琛). He married Eileen Siu-Tsung Chen (1924-, 陳恕) and they had two sons, Christopher (1945-1966, 林凱) and Douglas (1949-, 林潮).

His father was an Anglican clergyman, the first Chinese to become one in Canada. He had two brothers: David 林達威 (1915-2002) and Andrew 林達文. David became a doctor; he married Florence Hsi 席與萱, daughter of financier Turpin Hsi 席德柄 (1891-1968) and was a close friend of Sun Ke 孫科 (1891-1973), son of Sun Yatsen 孫中山. Andrew married Sun Ke's daughter, Pearl Sun 孫穗英 (1922-).

Paul was close to the Sun family, and to the politically prominent widow of Sun Yatsen, Madame Soong Ching-ling 宋慶齡 (1893–1981), also through his wife Eileen, whose father Chen Xing 陳行 (1890-1953) was the right hand of T. V. Soong or Soong Tzu-wen 宋子文(1891-1971), Soong Ching-ling's brother.

He attended the University of British Columbia (UBC) for one year (1938–39) and then moved to the United States.

=== Student years in the United States ===
He entered the University of Michigan, Ann Arbor, in 1939 to study engineering, but soon found out that “his academic interests lay elsewhere, in International law “which could be used to defend China’s interests”; he graduated in this field in 1943. At Ann Arbor he engaged in public speaking, winning the first prize at the 1942 Northern Oratorical League with a speech supporting Chinese war effort against Japan. He also became a member of the Chinese Students’ Christian Association (CSCA), then the oldest and most influential Chinese Student Group in America, which was becoming growingly politicized due to the pressure of the Sino-Japanese War. He would become the Association's president in 1944. By that time he had moved to Cambridge, Massachusetts, to study at the Fletcher School of Law and Diplomacy and at Harvard. With the end of the war against Japan, as China descended into Civil War between Nationalists and Communists, the CSCA became more and more critical of the Nationalist regime and of American support of it against Communism. Feeling the increasingly hostile political climate in the United States he decided to move to China with his family in 1949, before finishing his dissertation at Harvard. In 1951 the CSCA was disbanded and restraining orders prohibited most Chinese students to return to the PRC.

=== Chinese years 1949-1964 ===
In China, he became close to premier Zhou Enlai, thanks to his contacts with a prominent returned Chinese academic he knew from Michigan and Harvard, Pu Shouchang 浦壽昌 (1922-2019). He also became close to Soong Ching-ling, to whom he had family connections through his brother Andrew as well as through his wife.

He worked variously as a freelance translator of contemporary Chinese literature and editor of an English-language international news bulletin. He was also a broadcaster and Artistic Director of English-language services in Radio Peking. He edited and narrated documentary films on China for the Central Documentary Film Studio. Towards the end of his stay, he was professor of international law and relations at Huaqiao University. In 1958, he took part in the first wave of "intellectuals sent down to the countryside" and spent a year working with the peasants in a poverty-stricken village in North China.

Shortly before the start of the Cultural Revolution, Song Qinglin advised him to return to Canada with his family.

=== Return to Canada and role in the détente towards China (1964–1970) ===
He returned to Vancouver in 1964. After a brief period of teaching at UBC, in 1965 he was offered a position at McGill, to teach Chinese History and head a new Centre for East Asian studies. Lin took the lead in building the university's Department of East Asian Studies from scratch as McGill buried its history of the once prominent School of Chinese Studies and Gest Chinese Research Library between 1928 and 1937. At the time, he was considered a controversial figure, object of a series of hostile editorials and reports inspired by Nationalist regime in Taiwan. Even his brother David, due to his loyalty to the Chinese Nationalist government, of which he was an overseas representative in Canada, grew estranged from him. The death of his son Christopher in a car accident close to the border between the US and Canada in August 1966, raised a strong but unproven suspicion that it was a hit arranged by the Nationalist government as a warning to his father, a not unusual strategy at the time.

He was one of the most influential voices advocating the recognition of China, most prominently at the 1966 Banff conference bringing together academics and foreign and Canadian diplomats, and at the 1967 Geneva convocation based on Pope John XXIII’s encyclical Pacem in Terris (Peace on Earth). In 1969, he organized the McGill’s China Consultation, bringing together Canadian as well as American academic and public figures with the aim to improve Sino-Canadian and Sino-American relations. On the Canadian side, this was an important step leading to the official recognition of October 1970 by the recently elected Trudeau government. On the American side, in January 1970, Henry Kissinger sent an associate of his, Ernst Florian Winter, to ask Lin to relay a confidential message to Zhou Enlai conveying Kissinger’s desire to meet Chinese leaders in view of a visit by President Nixon to China. Lin soon thereafter went to China to relay the message and meet Zhou Enlai, staying from May to October 1970. At his return, he was the object of a parliamentary interrogation accusing Pierre Trudeau of planning to nominate Lin the first ambassador to China.

=== Later role as mediator and as academic (1970–1988) ===
While not receiving any such nomination, Lin was generally perceived as an advisor to Trudeau and Kissinger and served for the following years as one of the main informal channels between China and Canadian and American politicians, journalists and academics

Beside this informal role Lin was a key player in developing economic ties between Canada and China, where in 1978 he led a ground-breaking trade delegation. He also advocated the formation of the Canada-China Business Council which remains a flourishing organization to date.

On November 26, 1979, Deng Xiaoping met Lin and Frank Gibney of the US Encyclopædia Britannica. During the meeting Deng announced a new stance on economic policy, introducing the concept of socialist market economy. Answering a question by Lin about past restrictions on the role of a market economy in China, Deng clarified: "why can't there be a market economy in socialism"? We can't say that this is capitalism. Our planned economy is in the primary position; it integrates with the market economy, but this is a socialist market economy."

He participated to the International dialogue with the Chinese Churches in Montreal, October 1981 where he met with his long-time friend K. H. Ting 丁光訓 (1915- 2012), then Anglican bishop of Zhejiang and a prominent figure in Chinese Christianity.

He retired from McGill in 1982.

In 1984, he collaborated with Gary Bush at the Canadian short documentary film "The Children of Soong Ching-ling", which was nominated for an Academy Award for Best Documentary Short.

He was appointed as rector of University of East Asia (later Macau University) in 1986. In his role as rector he conferred an honorary Doctor of Law degree on the former U.S. Secretary of State, Henry Kissinger, and the former Canadian Prime Minister, Pierre Elliott Trudeau. In 1988 he resigned as the Rector of the University of East Asia, due to the restriction of academic freedom under the Macau Government’s policy.

=== Later political activism and last years (1989–2004) ===
After his resignation, Lin settled back in Vancouver and became an Honorary Professor in the Institute of Asian Research at the University of British Columbia. He established and chaired the Institute's China Program for Integrative Research and Development and was appointed to the UBC Senate in 1994.

He played a role in organizing a number of Vancouver's civic societies.

After 1989, he became a vocal critic of Tiananmen repression.

In 1998, he became a Member of the Order of Canada, the highest national honour.

Equally active in community and charitable services, Lin set up a personal charity and donated steadily in support of children, hospitals, arts and social services in Vancouver. The Lin couple founded the Soong Ching Ling Children's Foundation of Canada which is devoted to linking the people of Canada and China, and promoting the education, health and welfare of children.

During the last years of his life he worked on his autobiography, completed by his wife Eileen Chen Lin In the Eye of the China Storm: A Life Between East & West (Montreal: McGill-Queen's University Press, 2011)

== Personal engagement ==
- Soong Ching Ling Children's Foundation of Canada
- Scholarship in memory of his son Christopher (1945-1966)

== Awards ==
In 1992, the Hong Kong Society of Chinese Scholars named him the "Most Distinguished Chinese Scholar."

Lin was named a member of the Order of Canada in 1998, the highest national honour, by the Governor-General of Canada in Ottawa in recognition of his lifelong commitment to fostering Canada-China relations.

In the words of a close friend and colleague, Lin was "a truly great Canadian and a great Chinese", a man who lived "a life of principle and a life of courage."

== List of publications ==
- "The change of values in contemporary China." Abridged transcript of an oral presentation given at the Report of a North American Working Party on "the Rise of China": Held Under the Auspices of the Political Commission of the World Student Christian Federation as a Part of the China Study Project at La Solitude, Montreal, Canada, January 7–13, 1968, pp. 197–209.
- "Historical Perspectives on Contemporary China", lead chapter in book, Contemporary China, Canadian Institute of International Affairs, 1968.
- "Beyond Coexistence", in Beyond Coexistence: The Requirements of peace, ed. by Edward Reed, New York, Grossman Publishers, 1968.
- "Education in China", chapter in China: A Century of Struggle, Canadian Institute of International Affairs, 1971.
- "Medicine in China", Center Magazine, Center for the Study of Democratic Institutions, Santa Barbara, California, June 1974.
- "War or Peace: The State of the Globe", Symposium Transcript, U. of Pennsylvania, 1974
- "Development guided by Values: Comments on China's Road and its Implications", concluding chapter of book entitled On the Creation of a Just World Order, ed. by Saul H. Mendlowitz, New York, The Free Press (MacMillan), 1975.
- "Historical Perspectives on Chinese Development Strategies", chapter in Global Goals, ed. by Dr. Ervin Laszlo, for the Club of Rome, 1977.
- "Endogenous Intellectual Creativity & the Emerging New International Order", United Nations University Asian Symposium, Kyoto University, 1978
- "China's New Stage of Development", monograph in Research Series, Graduate School of Business, Columbia U., 1981
- "China after the storm." World link. Sept.-Oct. 1989. p. 48-49.

== TV and Cinema Documentaries ==
10 part educational TV series on modern Chinese history broadcast by CTV television network 1968-1969.

1984 Documentary "The Children of Soong Ching-ling".

== Personal papers ==
- https://web.archive.org/web/20151118023245/http://library.ust.hk/info/paul-lin/pltk-intro.html
