= Recollections of Pavlovsk =

1984 film

- Directed by: Irina Kalinina
- Written by: Boris Dobrodeev
- Produced by: Irina Kalinina
- Production company: Lendoc
- Release date: 1984
- Country: Soviet Union
- Language: Russian

Recollections of Pavlovsk (Russian: Воспоминания о Павловске, romanized: Vospominaniye o Pavlovske) is a 1984 Soviet short documentary film about the restoration of Pavlovsk Palace directed by Irina Kalinina. At the 57th Academy Awards it was nominated for Best Documentary Short.

== Plot ==
Anna Ivanovna Zelenova had a profound love for Pavlovsk, considering it a true temple of art and feeling as though she couldn’t live without it. Even as a student, she led tours and knew every corner of the estate. At the onset of World War II, Zelenova was appointed director of the Pavlovsk Museum, and until September 17, 1941, she coordinated the evacuation and hidden storage of the museum’s most valuable artifacts. From September 1941 to January 1944, she endured the Siege of Leningrad, where she continued working tirelessly on preserving materials from Pavlovsk.

After the German retreat, Zelenova returned to Pavlovsk to find devastation: the palace burned, the park partially destroyed, and anything that couldn’t be evacuated looted. Overwhelmed, she thought, “Is this the end? Will Pavlovsk be nothing more than a painful memory?” The state commission’s grim assessment left little hope, concluding, "No architectural ensemble around Leningrad suffered as severely; there’s no foundation for restoration." Nevertheless, Zelenova began a relentless campaign to rebuild. She mobilized organizations and individuals, securing resources, traveling to Moscow, and tirelessly advocating for funds—even meeting with Kliment Voroshilov, who finally allocated additional funds. With her team of dedicated restorers, Zelenova spent twenty years reviving Pavlovsk, and by its 200th anniversary in 1977, the estate was restored to its former glory, standing as a testament to her unwavering dedication.
