= Boris Dobrodeev =

Russian screenwriter (1927–2022)

- Born: Boris Tikhonovich Dobrodeyev; 28 April 1927; Voronezh, Voronezh Oblast, Russian SFSR, Soviet Union
- Died: 23 September 2022 (aged 95)
- Occupation: Screenwriter

Boris Tikhonovich Dobrodeyev (Russian: Бори́с Ти́хонович Доброде́ев; 28 April 1927 – 23 September 2022) was a Russian screenwriter. He was honored with the medals Order "For Merit to the Fatherland", Order of Friendship, Order of the Badge of Honour, Lenin Prize, Vasilyev Brothers State Prize of the RSFSR, Shevchenko National Prize and Honoured Worker of the Arts Industry of the RSFSR.

Dobrodeev's work included writing for the documentary film Recollections of Pavlovsk. He died in September 2022, at the age of 95.
