= Wild by Law =

1991 film

- Film poster
- Produced by: Lawrence Hott, Diane Garey
- Distributed by: Direct Cinema
- Release date: 1991
- Country: United States
- Language: English

Wild by Law: The Rise of Environmentalism and the Creation of the Wilderness Act is a 1991 documentary film produced by Lawrence Hott and Diane Garey. It also aired as an episode of PBS' American Experience. It was nominated for an Academy Award for Best Documentary Feature.

The film is about the work of Aldo Leopold, Bob Marshall, founder of The Wilderness Society and Howard Zahniser. The film gives the philosophical and political underpinnings of the Wilderness Act of 1964. It was narrated by Linda Hunt. This documentary was made possible by the Arizona Humanities Council, which awarded the creators a Media Grant in 1991.
