= Gene Allen (art director) =

American art director (1918–2015)

- Born: June 17, 1918; Los Angeles, California, U.S.
- Died: October 7, 2015 (aged 97); Newport Beach, California, U.S.
- Occupation: Art director
- Years active: 1938-1975

Eugene "Gene" Allen (June 17, 1918 – October 7, 2015) was an American art director. He followed his father and became a Los Angeles Police officer after he was laid off from his first job as a sketch artist. After serving in the United States Navy during World War II, Allen went to art school to pursue his career. He won an Oscar in 1965 for Best Art Direction for My Fair Lady, and was nominated for A Star Is Born in 1955 and for Les Girls in 1958. He served as President of the Academy of Motion Pictures Arts and Sciences from 1983 to 1985 and received a Special Achievement Award from the Art Directors Guild in 1997. Allen died on October 7, 2015, at the age of 97.

Non-profit organization positions
Preceded by Fay Kanin	President of the Academy of Motion Pictures Arts and Sciences; 1983-1985	Succeeded by Robert Wise
