= Up (1984 film) =

1984 film

- Directed by: Mike Hoover; Tim Huntley
- Produced by: Mike Hoover
- Starring: Ed Cesar; Erick McWayne
- Cinematography: Rande Deluca; Mike Hoover; Tim Huntley; Beverly Johnson
- Distributed by: Pyramid Films
- Release date: 1984
- Running time: 14 minutes
- Country: United States
- Language: English

Up is a 1984 American short film directed by Mike Hoover and Tim Huntley.

== Summary ==
The film depicts a man who sets a hawk free, then tries to find it in the wild on his hang glider.

== Cast ==
- Ed Cesar as Himself
- Erick McWayne as The Boy

== Reception ==
Up was named to the ALA Notable Children's Videos list in 1984. In 1985, it won an Oscar for Best Short Subject at the 57th Academy Awards.
