= The Garden of Eden (1984 film) =

1984 short film

- Directed by: Roger M. Sherman
- Produced by: Lawrence R. Hott; Roger M. Sherman
- Production company: Florentine Films
- Distributed by: Direct Cinema Limited
- Release date: 1984
- Running time: 28 minutes
- Country: United States
- Language: English

The Garden of Eden is a 1984 American short documentary film directed by Roger M. Sherman and Lawrence Hott. It was nominated for an Academy Award for Best Documentary Short.
