= In the Name of the People (1985 film) =

1985 film

- Directed by: Frank Christopher
- Produced by: Frank Christopher; Alex W. Drehsler
- Narrated by: Martin Sheen
- Edited by: Frank Christopher
- Distributed by: Icarus Films
- Release date: March 1985
- Running time: 73 minutes
- Country: United States
- Language: English

In the Name of the People is a 1985 American documentary film directed by Frank Christopher about the Salvadoran Civil War. The film follows four filmmakers who secretly entered El Salvador, marched with guerrillas across the country, and followed them into combat against government forces in San Salvador. It was nominated for an Academy Award for Best Documentary Feature.
