= The Children of Soong Ching Ling =

1984 film

- Directed by: Gary Bush
- Written by: Boyce Richardson
- Produced by: Gary Bush; Paul T. K. Lin
- Edited by: Shelly Hamer
- Production companies: Gary Bush Productions; UNICEF; Soong Ching Ling Children's Foundation of Canada
- Distributed by: Pyramid Films
- Release date: 1984
- Running time: 29 minutes
- Country: Canada
- Language: English

The Children of Soong Ching Ling is a 1984 Canadian short documentary film directed by Gary Bush. It was nominated for an Academy Award for Best Documentary Short. It is about the humanitarian work in support of children by Mrs. Soong Ching-ling, or Madame Sun Yat-sen. In particular the short film features an orphanage she sponsored.
