= Lawrence Hott =

American filmmaker

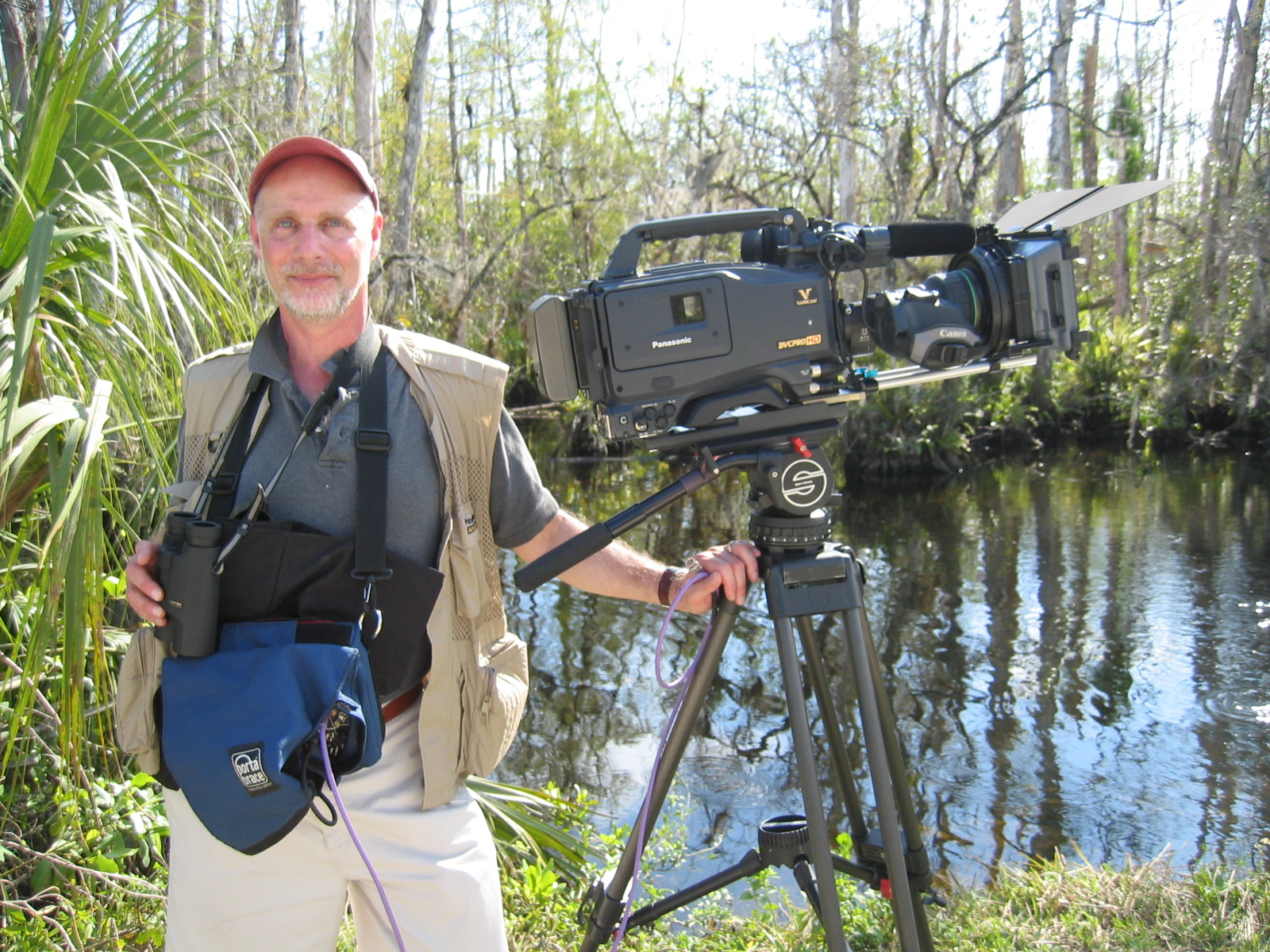
- Hott on production in the Everglades working on the film John James Audubon
- Born: 6 October 1950 (age 75); New York, U.S.
- Occupation: Documentary Filmmaker
- Website: www.florentinefilms.org

Lawrence "Larry" Hott is an American academic and documentary filmmaker.

Hott is a co-founding partner of Florentine Films, joining Ken Burns, Roger Sherman and Buddy Squires in documentary production in 1978. He has produced and directed documentary films for PBS, the Library of American Landscape History, the American Antiquarian Society and others. He has twice been nominated for an Academy Award, received a Peabody Award, the Alfred I. duPont-Columbia University Award, and five blue ribbons from the American Film Festival. Hott has taught courses in the University Without Walls program of the University of Massachusetts Amherst.

Hott is a member of the Academy of Motion Picture Arts and Sciences. Hott has been a Fulbright Program Fellow in both Vietnam and Great Britain.

== Filmography ==
- The Old Quabbin Valley 1982
- The Garden of Eden 1983
- The Adirondacks 1986
- Sentimental Women Need Not Apply 1988
- The Wilderness Idea 1989
- Wild by Law 1991
- Rebuilding the Temple: Cambodians in America 1992
- Knute Rockne and His Fighting Irish 1994
- Defending Everybody: The Story of the ACLU 1998
- The People's Plague: Tuberculosis in America
- The Boyhood Of John Muir 1998
- Divided Highways 1998
- Writing Alone and With Others
- Ohio: 200 Years
- Imagining Robert: My Brother, Madness and Survival
- The Harriman Alaska Expedition Retraced 2002
- John James Audubon: Drawn from Nature 2006
- Niagara Falls 2006
- On Thin Ice
- Through Deaf Eyes 2006
- The American Antiquarian Society
- Library of American Landscape History
- The Return of the Cuyahoga
- Frederick Law Olmsted: Designing America
- Rising Voices 2014
- Scitech Band: Pride of Springfield 2017
- The Warrior Tradition 2019
- The Niagara Movement: The Early Battle for Civil Rights 2023
