= Philippe De Lacy =

American actor

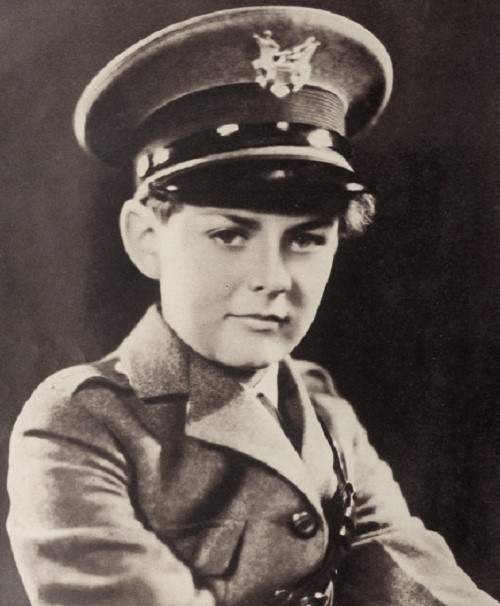
- Born: July 25, 1917; Nancy, France
- Died: July 29, 1995 (aged 78); Carmel, California, U.S.
- Occupations: Actor, producer, director, cinematographer
- Years active: 1921–1950

Philippe De Lacy (July 25, 1917 – July 29, 1995) was a French-born American child actor who became a film producer, director, and cinematographer in adulthood.

== Early life ==
Born during World War I, the already fatherless Philippe lost his mother and five siblings when a German shell devastated the family home. Only two days old at the time of tragedy, the boy was kept alive, but barely, in the basement of his grandmother's house. He was adopted by Mrs. Edith De Lacy, who was associated with the U.S. Women's Overseas Hospital.

After the war ended, Mrs. De Lacy brought Philippe to America, where his looks soon created opportunities for him as a model for magazine advertisements. His modeling assignments brought him to the attention of Hollywood, and he appeared in his first film in a bit part at the age of four.

Philippe's childhood story became the basis for a fictional children's book titled Little Philippe of Belgium, written by Madeline Brandeis as part of her "Children of the World" series.

== Career ==
=== Early career ===
De Lacy freelanced for several studios in the 1920s, but mostly for Paramount. In 1924 he played the role of Michael Darling in the classic silent version of Peter Pan, with Betty Bronson. He played the young Don Juan at ten years of age in John Barrymore's Don Juan (1926), and in 1927 he played the young prince Karl Heinrich in Ernst Lubitsch's memorable The Student Prince in Old Heidelberg, which also starred Ramon Novarro and Norma Shearer. Also in 1927 he starred with Greta Garbo and John Gilbert in Love, an updated version of the Tolstoy novel Anna Karenina in which he played the young son of Anna, Serezha Karenin.

When the sound era arrived De Lacy's acting career was declining, and he never made the transition from child actor to adult. Apart from his films, De Lacy also did some work in the theatre. However he had lost his boyish charm by his early teens and retired from the screen in the early 1930s.

=== Later career ===
De Lacy concentrated on the production end of films as a producer, director and cinematographer. He became an assistant to director Louis De Rochemont and worked with him in the 1940 film The Ramparts We Watch. Eventually he became an executive with the J. Walter Thompson advertising agency, a position he held for over 25 years.

De Lacy's first credit was in 1942 as an editorial associate for the US armed forces propaganda film We Are The Marines. Radio and television announcer Westbrook Van Voorhis provided the narration for the documentary, which was effectively a full-length fighting feature. In 1944, De Lacy was involved in another documentary, this time for the US Navy, filmed aboard the carrier Yorktown. The narrators in this documentary were actors Robert Taylor (who was actually a lieutenant in the navy at the time) and Charles Boyer who supplied the French narration.

De Lacy was the cinematographer in The Fighting Lady and had three real life naval commanders to assist him. This film won the 1945 Oscar for Best Documentary. De Lacy then turned his hand to directing a television series in 1950, and in addition, he also became manager of a local Hollywood television station. De Lacy also co-directed the financially successful 1955 documentary film Cinerama Holiday with Robert L. Bendick. After being largely unseen for decades, the film was released on Blu-ray in 2013.

== Filmography ==
- The Riddle: Woman (1920)
- Without Benefit of Clergy (1921)
- A Doll's House (1922)
- Wasted Lives (1923)
- Christmas (1923)
- Divorce (1923)
- Rosita (1923)
- The Shooting of Dan McGrew (1924)
- Peter Pan (1924)
- My Neighbor's Wife (1925)
- The Happy Warrior (1925)
- A Lover's Oath (1925)
- Don Juan (1926)
- Beau Geste (1926)
- The Blue Boy (1926)
- Faithful Wives (1926)
- Is Zat So? (1927)
- The Way of All Flesh (1927)
- The Magic Garden (1927)
- The Elegy (1927)
- The Student Prince in Old Heidelberg (1927)
- The Tigress (1927)
- Love (1927)
- The Broken Mask (1928)
- Mother Machree (1928)
- 4 Devils (1928)
- Napoleon's Barber (1928)
- The Redeeming Sin (1929)
- The Royal Rider (1929)
- Square Shoulders (1929)
- The Four Feathers (1929)
- The Marriage Playground (1929)
- General Crack (1930)
- Sarah and Son (1930)
- One Romantic Night (1930)
- The Sins of the Children (1930)

=== Director ===
- The Buster Keaton Show (1950) - TV Series
- Cinerama Holiday (1955)

=== Cinematographer ===
- The Fighting Lady (1944)

=== Editor ===
- We Are the Marines (1942)

== Stageplays ==
- Strangers at Home
- Growing Pains

== Death ==
De Lacy died from colon cancer in Carmel-by-the-Sea, California, aged 78. His cremated remains were scattered at sea.

== Bibliography ==
- Slide, Anthony. Silent Players: A Biographical and Autobiographical Study of 100 Silent Film Actors and Actresses (University Press of Kentucky, 2010), pp. 95–99.
- Holmstrom, John. The Moving Picture Boy: An International Encyclopaedia from 1895 to 1995, Norwich, Michael Russell, 1996, pp. 78–80.
- Dye, David. Child and Youth Actors: Filmography of Their Entire Careers, 1914-1985. Jefferson, NC: McFarland & Co., 1988, pp. 54–55.
- Best, Marc. Those Endearing Young Charms: Child Performers of the Screen (South Brunswick and New York: Barnes & Co., 1971), pp. 56–61.
