= Atomic Power (film) =

1946 film

- Advertisement in Life, August 12, 1946
- Directed by: Jack Glenn
- Produced by: Richard de Rochemont
- Starring: Dean Acheson; Vannevar Bush; Arthur Compton; James Conant; Albert Einstein; Enrico Fermi; Leslie Groves; Ernest Lawrence; David Lilienthal; Lise Meitner; J. Robert Oppenheimer; George Pegram; I. I. Rabi; Leó Szilárd; Merle Tuve; Harold Urey
- Narrated by: Westbrook Van Voorhis
- Production company: The March of Time
- Distributed by: 20th Century Fox
- Release date: August 9, 1946
- Running time: 18 minutes
- Country: United States
- Language: English

Atomic Power is an American short documentary film produced by The March of Time and released to theaters August 9, 1946, one year after the end of World War II. It was nominated for an Academy Award for Best Documentary Short.

Raymond Fielding, chronicler of The March of Time, cites Atomic Power as the only one of the series' postwar films to emerge as a classic. "It tells of the making of the atomic bomb, and is a quite remarkable example of film making in the March of Time tradition," Fielding wrote.

Nearly every person involved in the invention of the atomic bomb performs as an actor in the film, recreating the events and conversations that led up to the Trinity test, which is also reenacted and intercut with government footage of the blast. Jack Glenn directed.

== Reception ==
The National Board of Review called Atomic Power "a vivid short … a good condensation of masses of material into simple, clear exposition". Atomic Power was nominated for an Academy Award for Best Documentary Short.

== See also ==
- List of films about nuclear issues
- List of books about nuclear issues
