= De Rochemont =

De Rochemont, often appearing as de Rochemont, is a surname. Notable people with the surname include:

De Rochemont or de Rochemont may refer to:

- Charles Pictet de Rochemont (1755–1824), Swiss statesman and diplomat
- H. A. Sinclair de Rochemont (1901–1942), Dutch fascist and Nazi collaborator
- Richard de Rochemont (1903–1982), American documentary filmmaker, brother of Louis
- Louis de Rochemont (1899–1978), American documentary filmmaker, brother of Richard

== See also ==
- DeRochmont House, a historic house in Winchester, Massachusetts, U.S.
