= Sources for Citizen Kane =

1941 film

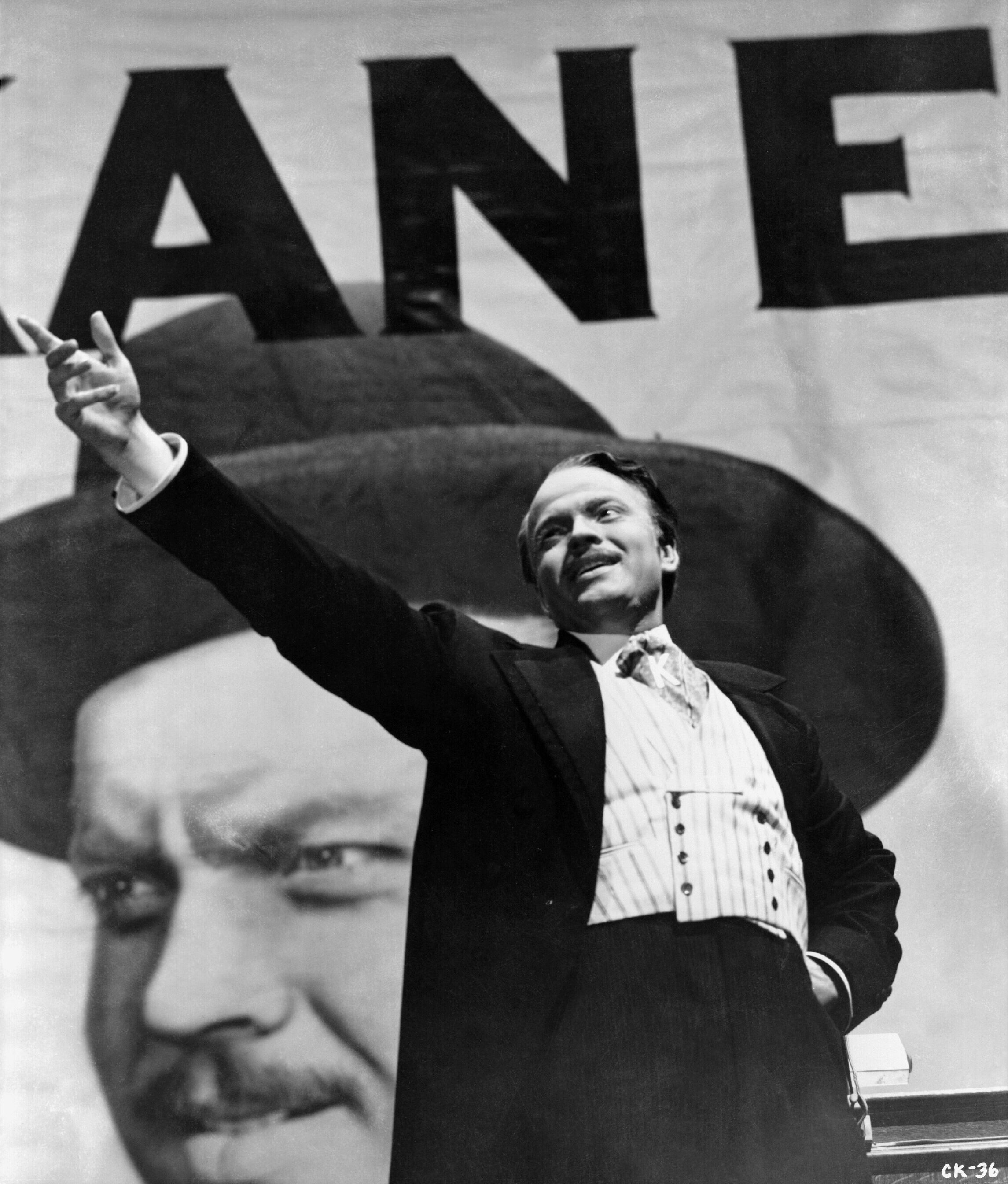
Orson Welles in Citizen Kane

The sources for Citizen Kane, the 1941 American motion picture that marked the feature film debut of Orson Welles, have been the subject of speculation and controversy since the project's inception. With a story spanning 60 years, the quasi-biographical film examines the life and legacy of Charles Foster Kane, played by Welles, a fictional character based in part upon the American newspaper magnate William Randolph Hearst and Chicago tycoons Samuel Insull and Harold McCormick. A rich incorporation of the experiences and knowledge of its authors, the film earned an Academy Award for Best Writing (Original Screenplay) for Herman J. Mankiewicz and Welles.

== Charles Foster Kane ==
I wished to make a motion picture which was not a narrative of action so much as an examination of character. For this, I desired a man of many sides and many aspects.

— Press statement issued by Orson Welles January 15, 1941, regarding his forthcoming motion picture, Citizen Kane

Orson Welles never confirmed a principal source for the character of Charles Foster Kane. John Houseman, who worked with screenwriter Herman J. Mankiewicz on the early draft scripts, wrote that Kane is a synthesis of different personalities, with Hearst's life used as the main source. "The truth is simple: for the basic concept of Charles Foster Kane and for the main lines and significant events of his public life, Mankiewicz used as his model the figure of William Randolph Hearst. To this were added incidents and details invented or derived from other sources." Houseman adds that they "grafted anecdotes from other giants of journalism, including Pulitzer, Northcliffe and Mank's first boss, Herbert Bayard Swope."

Welles said, "Mr. Hearst was quite a bit like Kane, although Kane isn't really founded on Hearst in particular, many people sat for it so to speak". He specifically acknowledged that aspects of Kane were drawn from the lives of two business tycoons familiar from his youth in Chicago — Samuel Insull and Harold Fowler McCormick. (Note: Welles states, "There's all that stuff about McCormick and the opera. I drew a lot from that from my Chicago days. And Samuel Insull.")

=== William Randolph Hearst ===
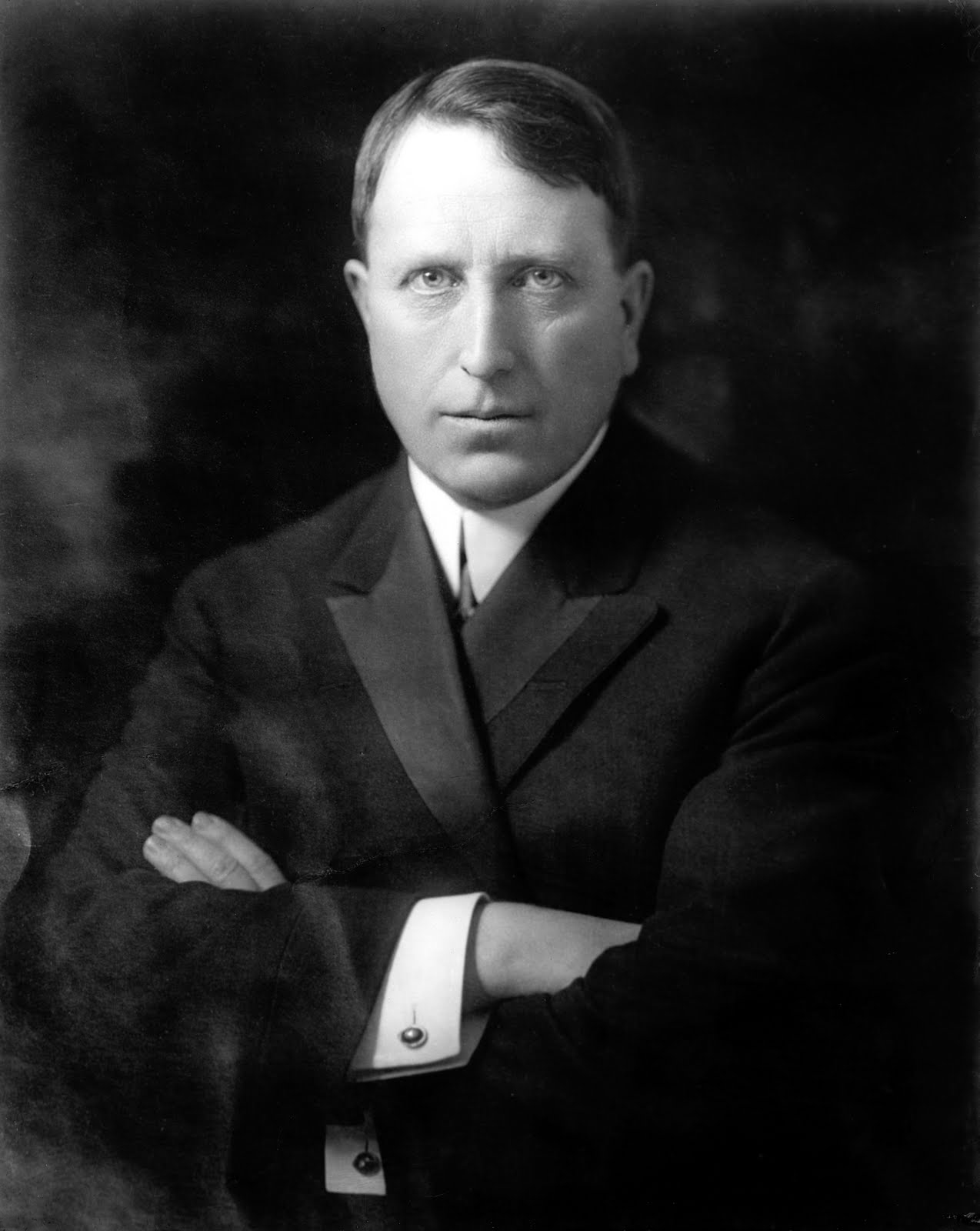
Although various sources were used as a model for Kane, William Randolph Hearst was the primary inspiration.

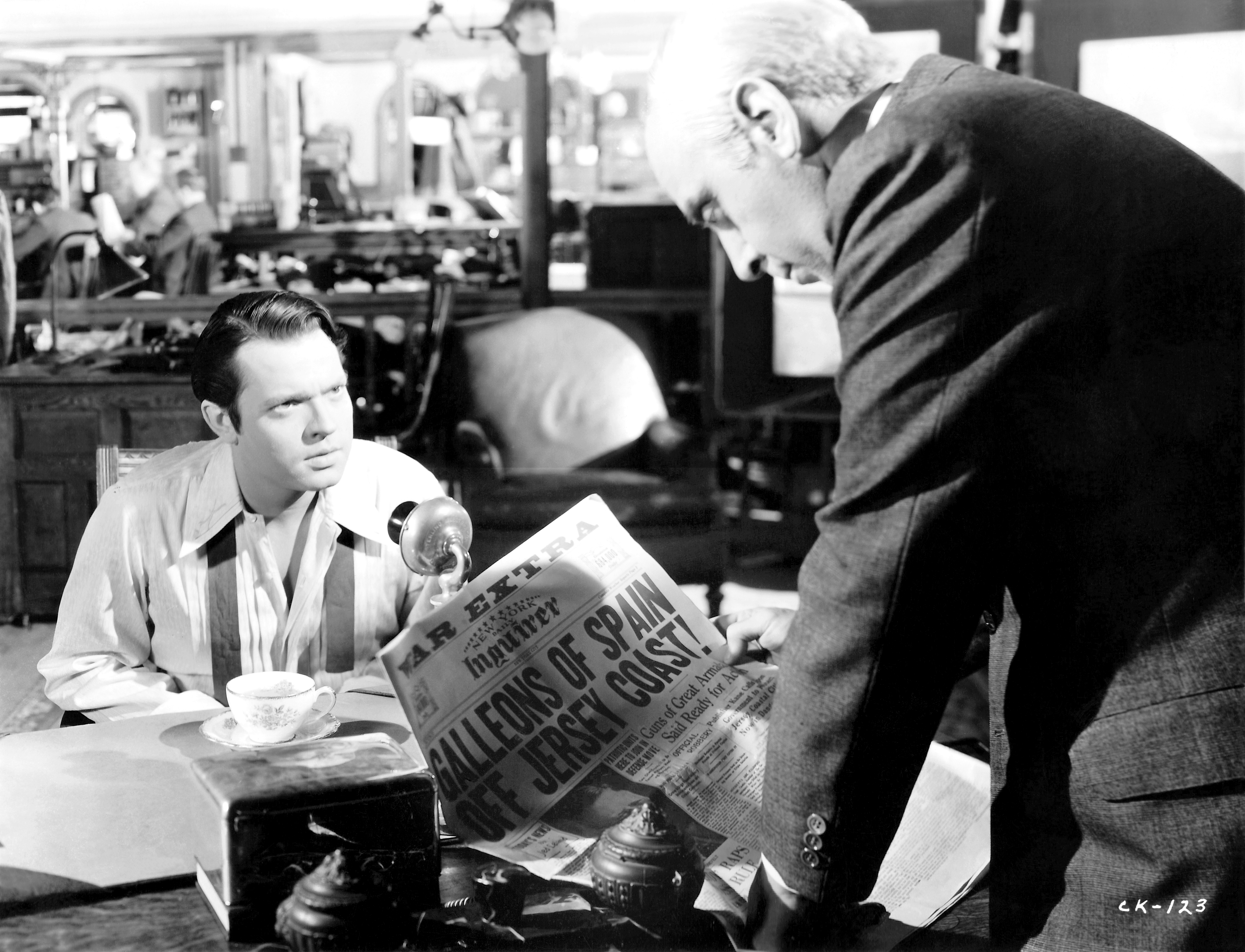
Kane's response to a cable from a correspondent in Cuba—"You provide the prose poems, I'll provide the war"— is the film's most overt allusion to Hearst.

William Randolph Hearst was born rich. He was the pampered son of an adoring mother. That is the decisive fact about him. Charles Foster Kane was born poor and was raised by a bank.

— Orson Welles

The film is commonly regarded as a fictionalized, unrelentingly hostile parody of William Randolph Hearst, in spite of Welles's statement that "Citizen Kane is the story of a wholly fictitious character." Film historian Don Kilbourne has pointed out that much of the film's story is derived from aspects of Hearst's life that had already been published and that "some of Kane's speeches are almost verbatim copies of Hearst's. When Welles denied that the film was about the still-influential publisher, he did not convince many people."

The most identifiable anecdote from Hearst's life used in the film is his famous but almost certainly apocryphal exchange with illustrator Frederic Remington. In January 1897 Remington was sent to Cuba by Hearst's New York Journal, to provide illustrations to accompany Richard Harding Davis's reporting about an uprising against Spain's colonial rule. Remington purportedly cabled Hearst from Havana that he wished to return since everything was quiet and there would be no war. Hearst is supposed to have replied, "Please remain. You furnish the pictures, and I'll furnish the war". Although Hearst denied the truth of the now legendary story, a milestone of yellow journalism, the ensuing Spanish–American War has been called "Mr. Hearst's War".

Hearst biographer David Nasaw described Kane as "a cartoon-like caricature of a man who is hollowed out on the inside, forlorn, defeated, solitary because he cannot command the total obedience, loyalty, devotion, and love of those around him. Hearst, to the contrary, never regarded himself as a failure, never recognized defeat, never stopped loving Marion [Davies] or his wife. He did not, at the end of his life, run away from the world to entomb himself in a vast, gloomy art-choked hermitage."

Arguing for the release of Citizen Kane before the RKO board, Welles pointed out the irony that it was Hearst himself who had brought so much attention to the film being about him, and that Hearst columnist Louella Parsons was doing the most to publicize Kane's identification with Hearst. Public denials aside, Welles held the view that Hearst was a public figure and that the facts of a public figure's life were available for writers to reshape and restructure into works of fiction. Welles's legal advisor, Arnold Weissberger, put the issue in the form of a rhetorical question: "Will a man be allowed in effect to copyright the story of his life?"

Welles said that he had excised one scene from Mankiewicz's first draft that had certainly been based on Hearst. "In the original script we had a scene based on a notorious thing Hearst had done, which I still cannot repeat for publication. And I cut it out because I thought it hurt the film and wasn't in keeping with Kane's character. If I'd kept it in, I would have had no trouble with Hearst. He wouldn't have dared admit it was him.

In her 1971 essay, "Raising Kane", film critic Pauline Kael wrote that a vestige of this abandoned subplot survives in a remark made by Susan Alexander Kane to the reporter interviewing her: "Look, if you're smart, you'll get in touch with Raymond. He's the butler. You'll learn a lot from him. He knows where all the bodies are buried." Kael observed, "It's an odd, cryptic speech. In the first draft, Raymond literally knew where the bodies were buried: Mankiewicz had dished up a nasty version of the scandal sometimes referred to as the Strange Death of Thomas Ince." Referring to the suspicious 1924 death of the American film mogul after being a guest on Hearst's yacht, and noting that Kael's principal source was Houseman, film critic Jonathan Rosenbaum wrote that "it seems safe to conclude, even without her prodding, that some version of the story must have cropped up in Mankiewicz's first draft of the script, which Welles subsequently edited and added to."

One particular aspect of the character, Kane's profligate collecting of possessions, was directly taken from Hearst. "And it's very curious – a man who spends his entire life paying cash for objects he never looked at," Welles said. "He just acquired things, most of which were never opened, remained in boxes. It's really a quite accurate picture of Hearst to that extent." However Welles himself insisted that there were marked differences between his fictional creation and Hearst. Xanadu was modeled after Hearst’s large mansion Hearst Castle in San Simeon, California, which also had a private zoo and a large collection of art.

=== Samuel Insull ===
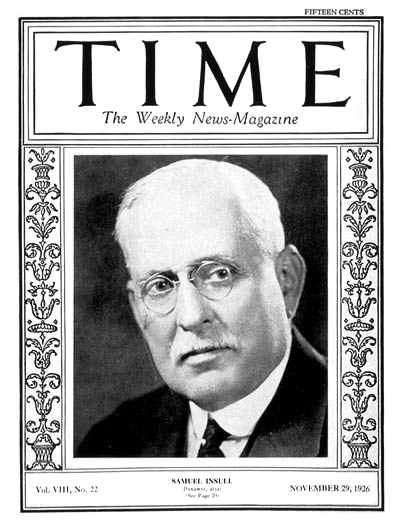
Chicago utilities magnate Samuel Insull built a fortune and lost it, and built the Chicago Opera House.

As a model for the makeup design of the old Charles Foster Kane, Welles gave Maurice Seiderman a photograph of Chicago industrialist Samuel Insull, with mustache.

A protégé of Thomas Edison, Insull was raised in a lower-middle-class family before becoming a dominant figure in the utilities field. He was married to a Broadway ingenue nearly 20 years his junior, invested heavily into reviving her career, and built the Chicago Civic Opera House.

In 1925, after a 26-year absence, Gladys Wallis Insull returned to the stage in a charity revival of The School for Scandal that ran two weeks in Chicago. When the performance was repeated on Broadway in October 1925, Herman Mankiewicz — then the third-string theater critic for The New York Times — was assigned to review the production. In an incident that became infamous, Mankiewicz returned to the press room drunk and wrote only the first sentence of a negative review before passing out on his typewriter. Mankiewicz resurrected the experience in writing the screenplay for Citizen Kane, incorporating it into the narrative of Jedediah Leland. (Note: Mankiewicz began his review, "Miss Gladys Wallis, an aging, hopelessly incompetent amateur …" Leland's review begins, "Miss Susan Alexander, a pretty but hopelessly incompetent amateur …")

In 1926 Insull took a six-year lease on Chicago's Studebaker Theatre and financed a repertory company in which his wife starred. Gladys Insull's nerves broke when her company failed to find success, and the lease expired at the same time Insull's $4 billion financial empire collapsed in the Depression. Insull died in July 1938, bankrupt and disgraced.

Insull's life was also well known to Welles. Insull's publicity director John Clayton was a friend of Roger Hill, Welles's teacher at the Todd School and a lifelong friend.

=== Harold McCormick ===
Like Kane, Harold McCormick was divorced by his aristocratic first wife, Edith Rockefeller, and lavishly promoted the opera career of his only modestly talented second wife, Ganna Walska. In 1920 McCormick arranged for her to play the lead in a production of Zaza at the Chicago Opera. She fled the country after her Italian vocal instructor told her that she was unprepared to perform the night before the sold-out premiere.

=== Other sources ===
Another member of the powerful McCormick family who inspired the character of Kane was Robert R. McCormick, the crusading publisher of the Chicago Tribune.

According to composer David Raksin, Bernard Herrmann used to say that much of Kane's story was based on McCormick, but that there was also a good deal of Welles in the flamboyant character.

Welles cited financier Basil Zaharoff as another inspiration for Kane. "I got the idea for the hidden-camera sequence in the Kane 'news digest' from a scene I did on March of Time in which Zaharoff, this great munitions-maker, was being moved around in his rose garden, just talking about the roses, in the last days before he died," Welles said. Film scholar Robert L. Carringer reviewed the December 3, 1936, script of the radio obituary in which Welles played Zaharoff, and found other similarities. In the opening scene, Zaharoff's secretaries are burning masses of secret papers in the enormous fireplace of his castle. A succession of witnesses testify about the tycoon's ruthless practices. "Finally, Zaharoff himself appears — an old man nearing death, alone except for his servants in the gigantic palace in Monte Carlo that he had acquired for his longtime mistress. His dying wish is to be wheeled out 'in the sun by that rosebush.'"

The last name of Welles's friend, actor Whitford Kane, was used for Charles Foster Kane.

== Jedediah Leland ==
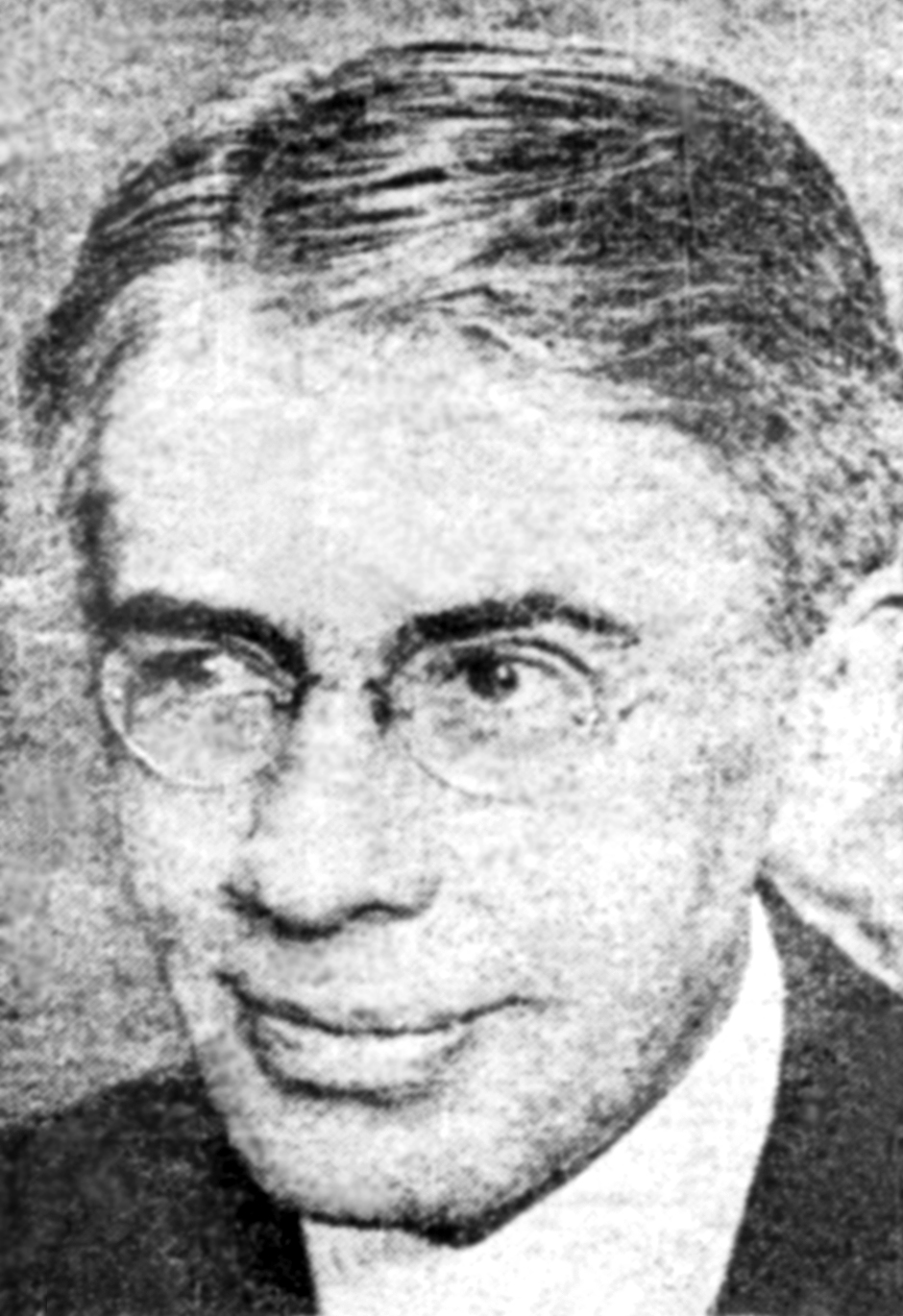
Ashton Stevens (1920)

In 1940, Welles invited longtime friend and Mercury Theatre colleague Joseph Cotten to join a small group for an initial read-through at Mankiewicz's house. Cotten wrote:

"I think I'll just listen," Welles said. "The title of this movie is Citizen Kane, and I play guess who." He turned to me. "Why don't you think of yourself as Jedediah Leland? His name, by the way, is a combination of Jed Harris and your agent, Leland Hayward." "There all resemblance ceases," Herman reassured me. These afternoon garden readings continued, and as the Mercury actors began arriving, the story started to breathe.

"I regard Leland with enormous affection," Welles told Bogdanovich, adding that the character of Jed Leland was based on drama critic Ashton Stevens, George Stevens's uncle and his own close boyhood friend. Regarded as the dean of American drama critics, Stevens began his journalism career in 1894 in San Francisco and started working for the Hearst newspapers three years later. In 1910 he moved to Chicago, where he covered the theater for 40 years and became a close friend of Dr. Maurice Bernstein, Welles's guardian. When Welles was a child Stevens used to tell him stories about Hearst, much like Leland tells Thompson about Kane in the film.

Welles said that he learned most of what he knew about the life of Hearst from Stevens. Welles sent Stevens an advance copy of the Citizen Kane script, and took him to the set during filming. (Note: Actor Landers Stevens, Ashton Stevens's brother, made his final screen appearance in Citizen Kane as a Senate investigator.) "Later he saw the movie and thought the old man would be thrilled by it," said Welles. "Ashton was really one of the great ones. The last of the dandies — he worked for Hearst for some 50 years or so, and adored him. A gentleman … very much like Jed.

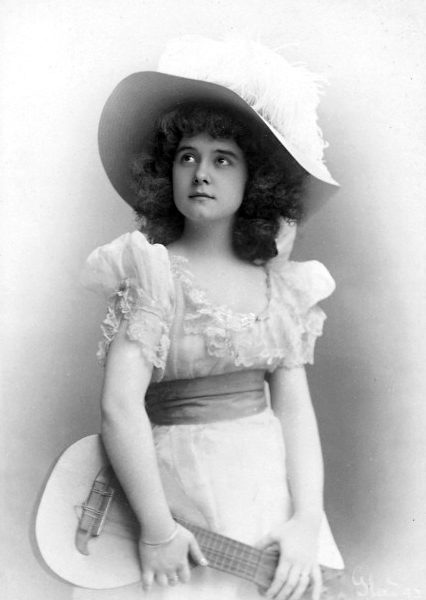
Gladys Wallis in 1893, six years before her marriage to Samuel Insull

Mankiewicz incorporated an incident from his own early career as a theater critic into Leland. Mankiewicz was assigned to review the October 1925 opening of Gladys Wallis' production of The School for Scandal. After her opening-night performance in the role of Lady Teazle, Mankiewicz returned to the press room "… full of fury and too many drinks …", wrote biographer Richard Meryman:

He was outraged by the spectacle of a 56-year-old millionairess playing a gleeful 18-year-old, the whole production bought for her like a trinket by a man Herman knew to be an unscrupulous manipulator. Herman began to write: "Miss Gladys Wallis, an aging, hopelessly incompetent amateur, opened last night in ..." Then Herman passed out, slumped over the top of his typewriter.

The unconscious Mankiewicz was discovered by his boss, George S. Kaufman, who composed a terse announcement that the Times review would appear the following day. (Note: "The School for Scandal, with Mrs. Insull as Lady Teazle, was produced at the Little Theatre last night. It will be reviewed in tomorrow's Times.")

Mankiewicz resurrected the incident for Citizen Kane. After Kane's second wife makes her opera debut, critic Jed Leland returns to the press room drunk. He passes out over the top of his typewriter after writing the first sentence of his review: "Miss Susan Alexander, a pretty but hopelessly incompetent amateur …"

== Susan Alexander Kane ==
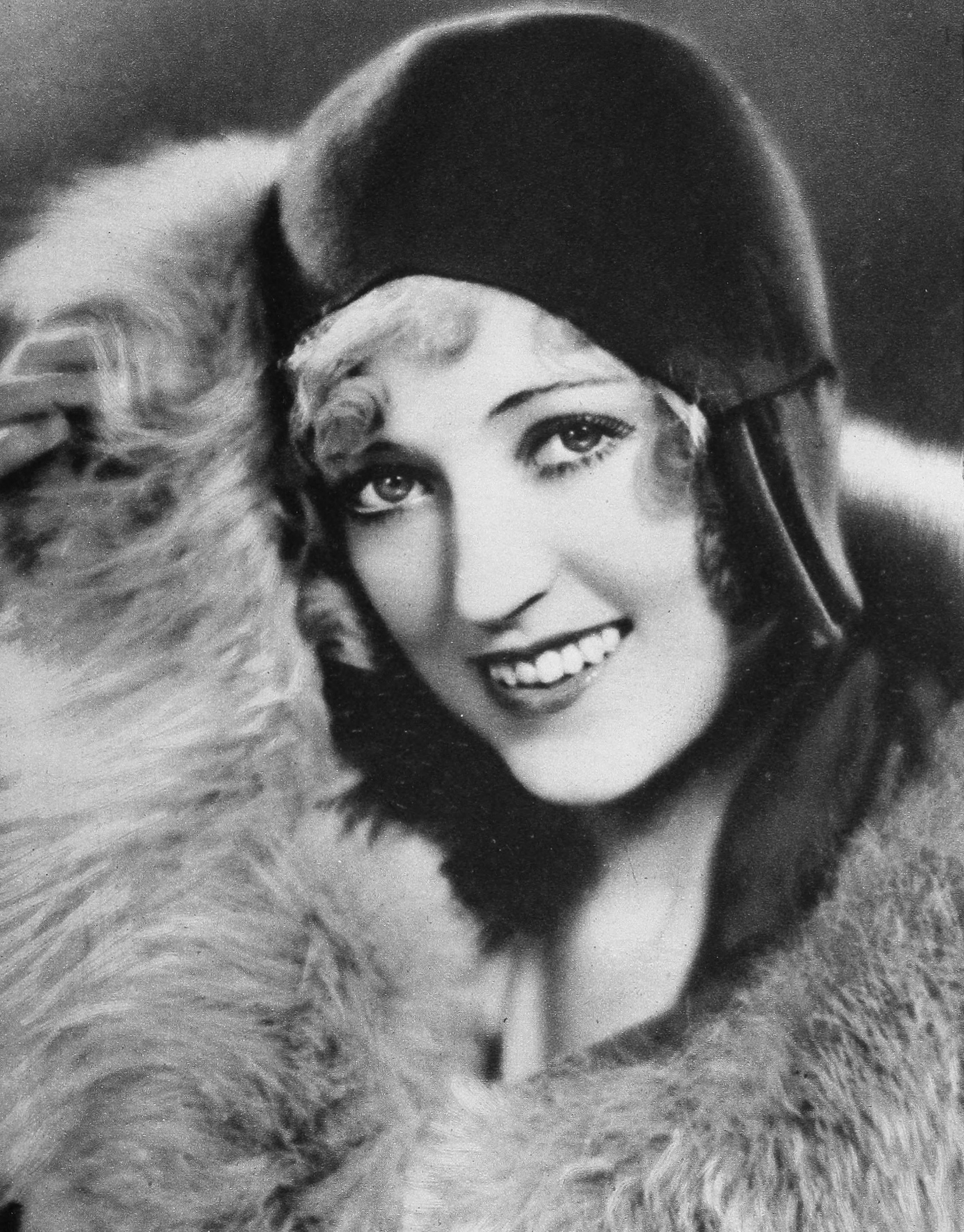
Hearst was disturbed by the film's supposed depiction of Marion Davies, but Welles always denied that Susan Alexander Kane was based on Davies.

It was a real man who built an opera house for the soprano of his choice, and much in the movie was borrowed from that story, but the man was not Hearst. Susan, Kane's second wife, is not even based on the real-life soprano. Like most fictional characters, Susan's resemblance to other fictional characters is quite startling. To Marion Davies she bears no resemblance at all.

— Orson Welles

The assumption that the character of Susan Alexander Kane was based on Marion Davies was a major reason Hearst tried to destroy Citizen Kane. Davies's nephew Charles Lederer insisted that Hearst and Davies never saw Citizen Kane, but condemned it based on the outrage expressed by trusted friends. Lederer believed that any implication that Davies was a failure and an alcoholic distressed Hearst more than any unfavorable references to himself.

In his foreword to Davies's posthumously published autobiography, Welles drew a sharp distinction between his fictional creation and Davies: "That Susan was Kane's wife and Marion was Hearst's mistress is a difference more important than might be guessed in today's changed climate of opinion. The wife was a puppet and a prisoner; the mistress was never less than a princess. … The mistress was never one of Hearst's possessions: he was always her suitor, and she was the precious treasure of his heart for more than 30 years, until his last breath of life. Theirs is truly a love story. Love is not the subject of Citizen Kane." Welles called Davies "an extraordinary woman—nothing like the character Dorothy Comingore played in the movie", and told Peter Bogdanovich "I always thought [Hearst] was right to be upset about" the character's association with Davies.

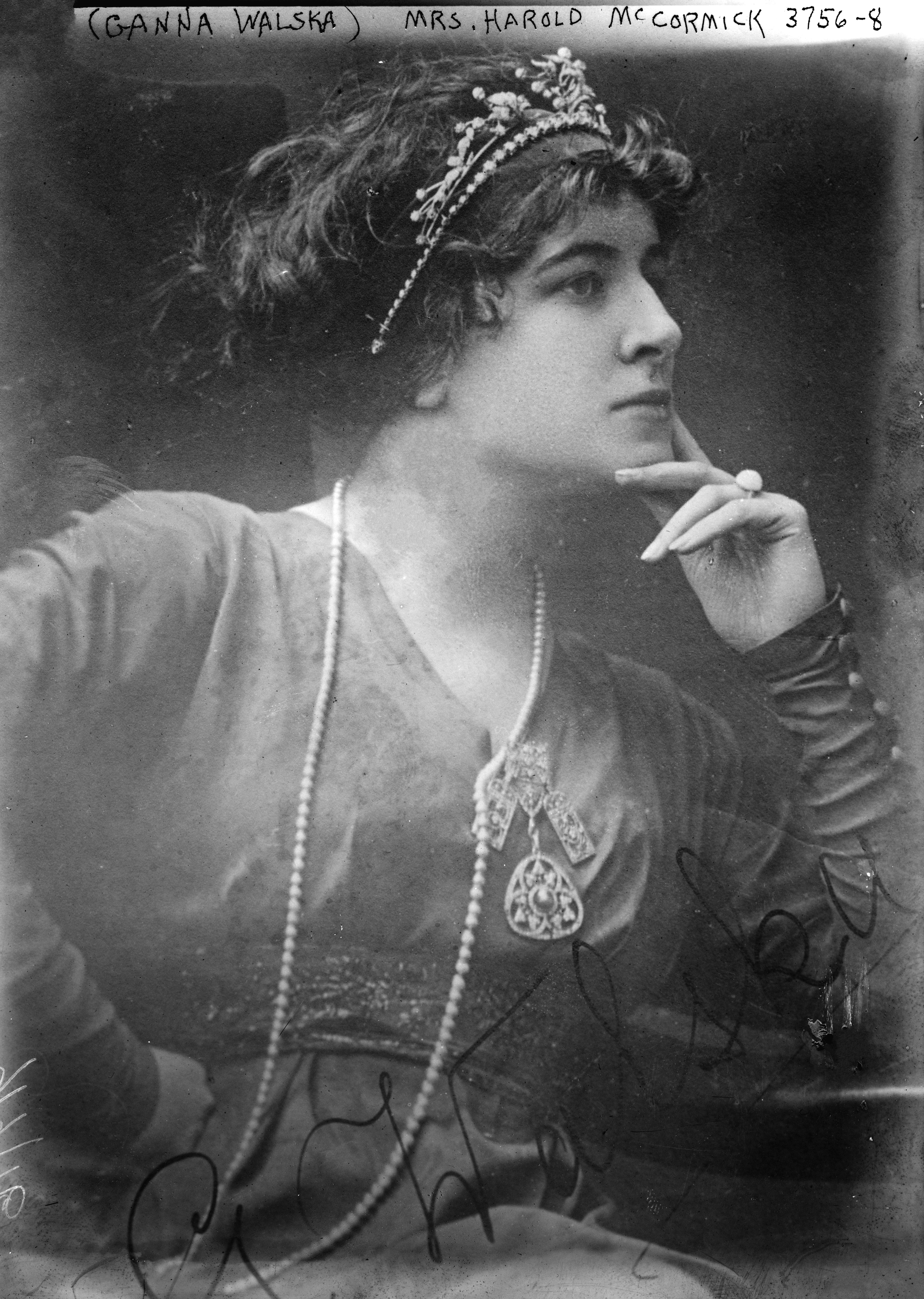
Ganna Walska after her marriage to Harold F. McCormick, who lavishly promoted her lackluster opera career

He cited Insull's building of the Chicago Opera House, and McCormick's lavish promotion of the opera career of his second wife, Ganna Walska, as direct influences on the screenplay. Contemporaries said Walska had a terrible voice; The New York Times headlines of the day read, "Ganna Walska Fails as Butterfly: Voice Deserts Her Again When She Essays Role of Puccini's Heroine" and "Mme. Walska Clings to Ambition to Sing".

"According to her 1943 memoirs, Always Room at the Top, Walska had tried every sort of fashionable mumbo jumbo to conquer her nerves and salvage her voice," reported The New York Times in 1996. "Nothing worked. During a performance of Giordano's Fedora in Havana she veered so persistently off key that the audience pelted her with rotten vegetables. It was an event that Orson Welles remembered when he began concocting the character of the newspaper publisher's second wife for Citizen Kane."

Lederer said that the script he read "didn't have any flavor of Marion and Hearst." Lederer noted that Davies drank and did jigsaw puzzles, but this behavior was exaggerated in the film to help define the characterization of Susan Alexander.

Others thought to have inspired the character are film tycoon Jules Brulatour's second and third wives, Dorothy Gibson and Hope Hampton, both fleeting stars of the silent screen who later had marginal careers in opera. The interview with Susan Alexander Kane in the Atlantic City nightclub was based on a contemporary interview with Evelyn Nesbit Thaw in the run-down club where she was performing.

Susan Alexander's last name was taken from Mankiewicz's secretary, Rita Alexander.

== Jim W. Gettys ==
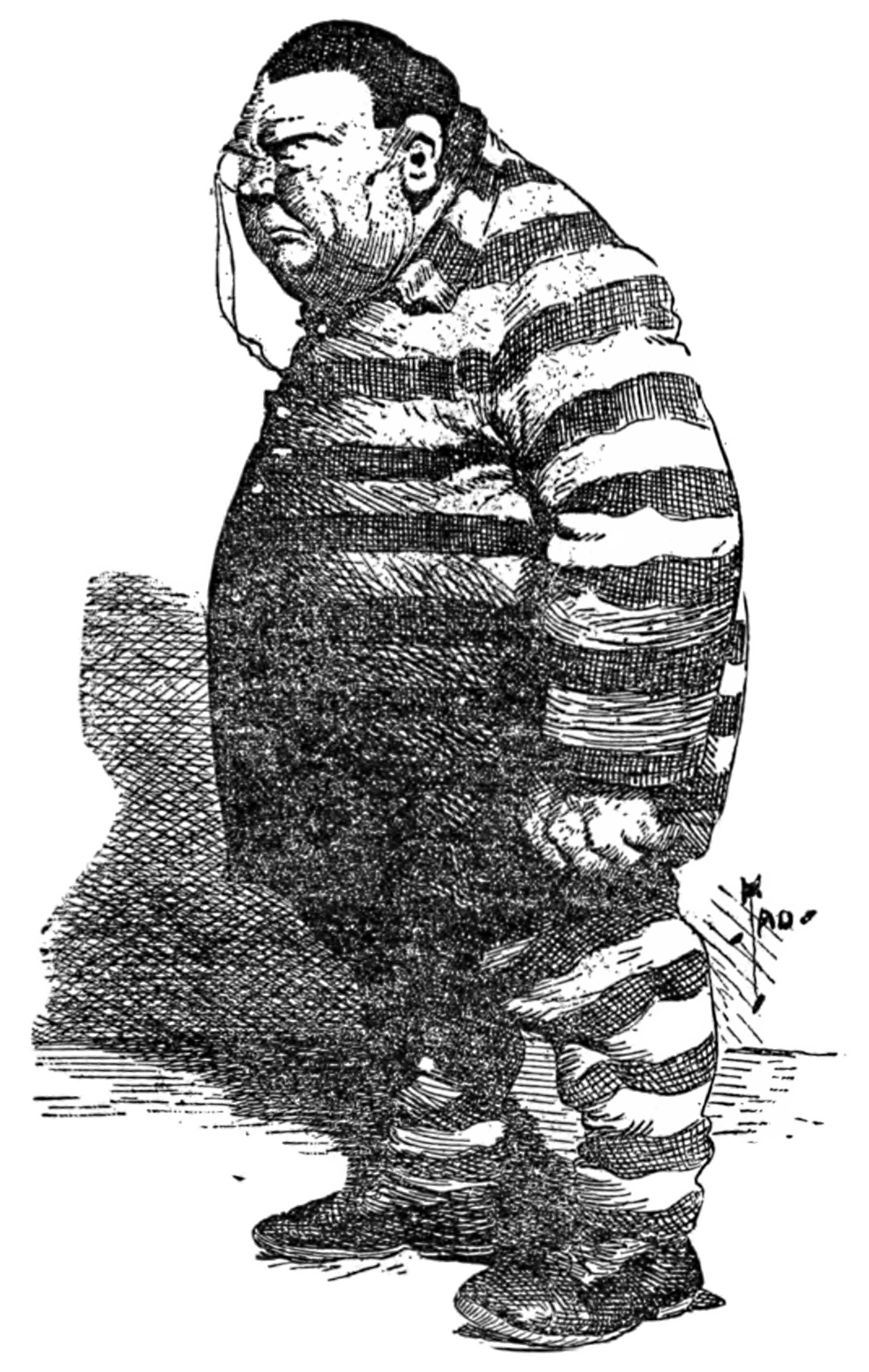
Tad Dorgan's caricature of Charles F. Murphy, which appeared in Hearst's New York Journal (November 10, 1905), is described by Boss Jim W. Gettys in Citizen Kane.

The character of political boss Jim W. Gettys is based on Charles F. Murphy, a leader in New York City's infamous Tammany Hall political machine. Hearst and Murphy were political allies in 1902, when Hearst was elected to the U.S. House of Representatives, but became enemies in 1905 when Hearst ran for mayor of New York. Hearst turned his muckraking newspapers on Tammany Hall in the person of Murphy, who was called "... the most hungry, selfish and extortionate boss Tammany has ever known." Murphy ordered that under no condition was Hearst to be elected. Hearst ballots were dumped into the East River, and new ballots were printed favoring his opponent. Hearst was defeated by some 3,000 votes and his newspapers bellowed against the election fraud.

A historic cartoon of Murphy in convict stripes appeared November 10, 1905, three days after the vote. The caption read, "Look out, Murphy! It's a Short Lockstep from Delmonico's to Sing Sing ... Every honest voter in New York wants to see you in this costume."

In Citizen Kane, Boss Jim W. Gettys (named "Edward Rogers" in the shooting script) admonishes Kane for printing a cartoon showing him in prison stripes:

If I owned a newspaper and if I didn't like the way somebody else was doing things—some politician, say—I'd fight them with everything I had. Only I wouldn't show him in a convict suit with stripes—so his children could see the picture in the paper. Or his mother.

As he pursues Gettys down the stairs, Kane threatens to send him to Sing Sing.

As an inside joke, Welles named Gettys after the father-in-law of his mentor, Roger Hill, a teacher at Todd Seminary for Boys.

== Other characters ==
Houseman claimed that Walter P. Thatcher was loosely based on J. P. Morgan, but only in the general sense of Morgan being an old-fashioned 19th century capitalist with ties to Wall Street finances and railroad companies.

When Welles was 15 he became the ward of Dr. Maurice Bernstein. Bernstein is the last name of the only major character in Citizen Kane who receives a generally positive portrayal. Although Dr. Bernstein was nothing like the character in the film (possibly based on Solomon S. Carvalho, Hearst's business manager), Welles said, the use of his surname was a family joke: "I used to call people 'Bernstein' on the radio, all the time, too – just to make him laugh." Composer David Raksin described Sloane's portrayal of Bernstein as "a compendium of the mannerisms of Bernard Herrmann: he looks like Benny, acts like him, and even talks like him."

Herbert Carter, editor of The Inquirer, was named for actor Jack Carter.

== "Rosebud" ==
Charles Foster Kane, as Welles presents him, was a man who had everything money could buy except love. He lacked that, which was all he wanted, because he had no love to give—except love of self. He died, lonely in his vast and fabulous palace, crying out (in a single word) for a return to his childhood.

— Robbin Coons, Associated Press (May 1, 1941)

"The most basic of all ideas was that of a search for the true significance of the man's apparently meaningless dying words," Welles wrote in a January 1941 press statement about the forthcoming Citizen Kane. He described the meaning of "Rosebud": "In his subconscious it represented the simplicity, the comfort, above all the lack of responsibility in his home, and also it stood for his mother's love which Kane never lost."

Welles credited the "Rosebud" device to Mankiewicz. "Rosebud remained, because it was the only way we could find to get off, as they used to say in vaudeville," Welles said. "It manages to work, but I'm still not too keen about it, and I don't think that he was, either." Welles said that they attempted to diminish the importance of the word's meaning and "take the mickey out of it."

As he began his first draft of the screenplay in early 1940, Mankiewicz mentioned "Rosebud" to his secretary. When she asked, "Who is rosebud?" he replied, "It isn't a who, it's an it." Biographer Richard Meryman wrote that the symbol of Mankiewicz's own damaged childhood was a treasured bicycle, stolen while he visited the public library and not replaced by his family as punishment. (Note: Mankiewicz biographer Richard Meryman wrote, "The prototype of Charles Foster Kane's sled was this bicycle … The bike became a symbol of Herman's bitterness about his Prussian father and the lack of love in his childhood.") "He mourned that all his life," wrote Kael, who believed Mankiewicz put the emotion of that boyhood loss into the loss that haunted Kane.

Hearst biographer Louis Pizzitola reports one historian's statement that "Rosebud" was a nickname given to Hearst's mother by portrait and landscape painter Orrin Peck, whose family were friends with the Hearsts. (Note: The source for Peck's giving the Rosebud nickname to Phoebe Hearst is a 1977 oral history interview with a researcher named Vonnie Eastham, conducted by California State University, Chico.) Another theory of the origin of "Rosebud" is the similarity with the dying wish of Zaharoff to be wheeled "by the rosebush".

In 1989 author Gore Vidal stated that "Rosebud" was a nickname which Hearst had used for the clitoris of Davies. Vidal said that Davies had told this intimate detail to Lederer, who had mentioned it to him years later. Film critic Roger Ebert said, "Some people have fallen in love with the story that Herman Mankiewicz…happened to know that 'Rosebud' was William Randolph Hearst's pet name for an intimate part of Marion Davies' anatomy." Welles biographer Frank Brady traced the story back to newspaper articles in the late 1970s, and wrote, "How Orson (or Mankiewicz) could have ever discovered this most private utterance is unexplained and why it took over 35 years for such a suggestive rationale to emerge…[is] unknown. If this highly unlikely story is even partially true…Hearst may have become upset at the implied connotation, although any such connection seems to have been innocent on Welles's part." Houseman denied this rumor about "Rosebud"'s origins, claiming that he would have heard about something "so provocative" and that Welles could never "have kept such a secret for over 40 years."

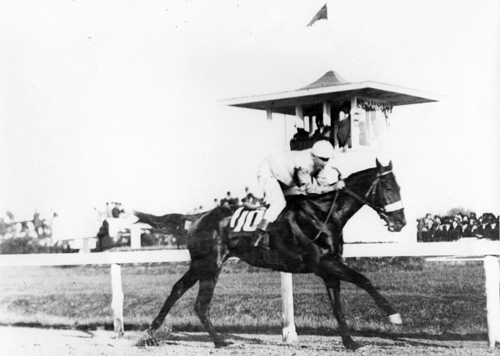
Old Rosebud, winner of the 1914 Kentucky Derby, inspired Mankiewicz's choice for Kane's enigmatic last word.

In 1991 journalist Edward Castle contended that Welles may have borrowed the name of Native American folklorist, educator and author Rosebud Yellow Robe for "Rosebud". Castle claimed to have found both of their signatures on the same sign-in sheets at CBS Radio studios in New York, where they both worked on different shows in the late 1930s. However, the word "Rosebud" appears in the first draft script written by Mankiewicz, not Welles.

In his 2015 Welles biography, Patrick McGilligan reported that Mankiewicz himself stated that the word "Rosebud" was taken from the name of a famous racehorse, Old Rosebud. Mankiewicz had a bet on the horse in the 1914 Kentucky Derby, which he won, and McGilligan wrote that "Old Rosebud symbolized his lost youth, and the break with his family". In testimony for a 1947 plagiarism suit brought by Hearst biographer Ferdinand Lundberg, Mankiewicz said, "I had undergone psycho-analysis, and Rosebud, under circumstances slightly resembling the circumstances in [Citizen Kane], played a prominent part."

== News on the March ==
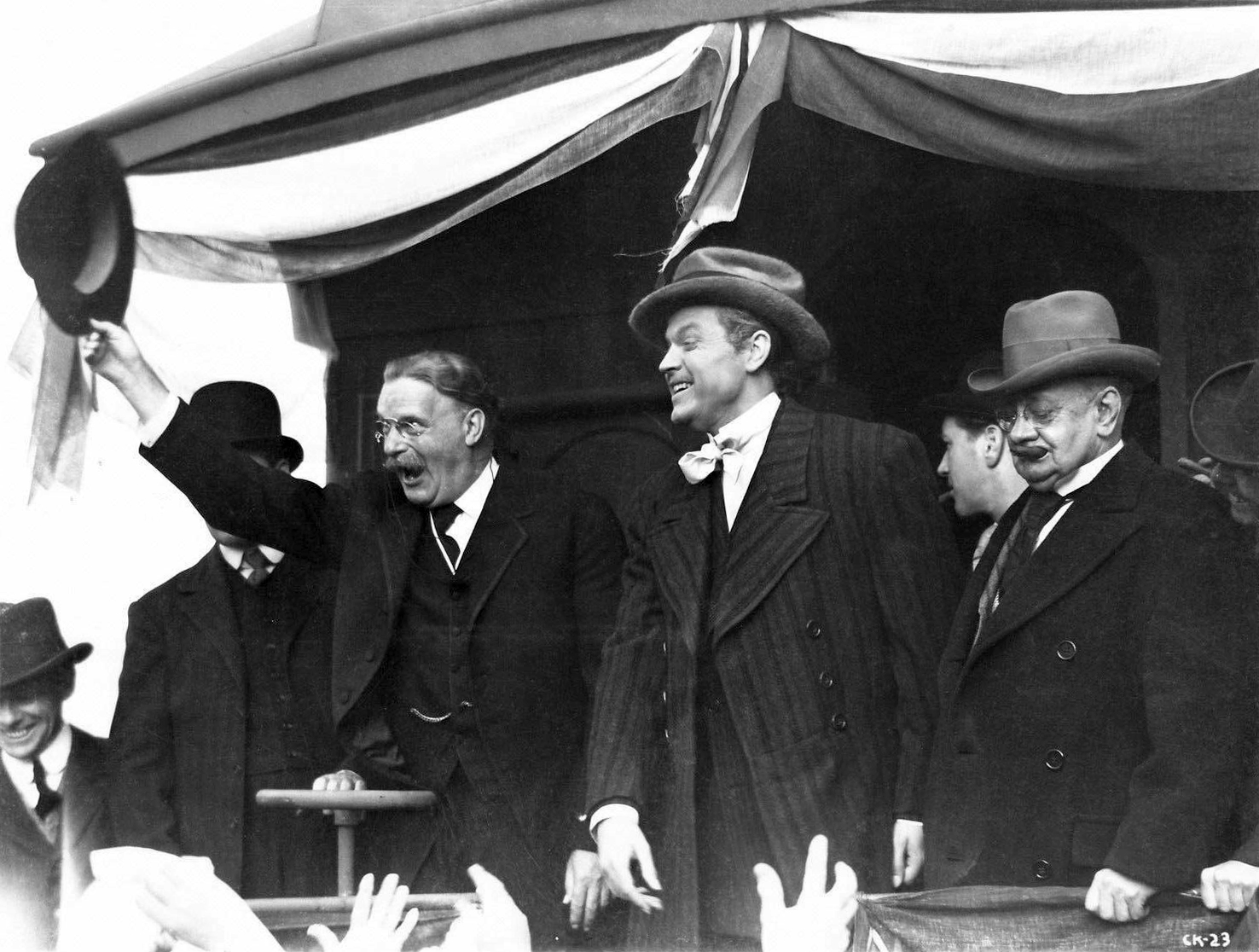
Teddy Roosevelt (Thomas A. Curran) campaigns with Kane in the News on the March sequence.

"Although Citizen Kane was widely seen as an attack on William Randolph Hearst, it was also aimed at Henry R. Luce and his concept of faceless group journalism, as then practiced at his Time magazine and March of Time newsreels," wrote Roger Ebert.

The News on the March sequence that begins the film satirizes The March of Time, the news documentary and dramatization series presented in movie theaters by Time Inc. from 1935 to 1951. At its peak The March of Time was seen by 25 million U.S. moviegoers a month. Usually called a newsreel series, it was actually a monthly series of short feature films twice the length of standard newsreels. The films were didactic, with a subjective point of view. The editors of Time described it as "pictorial journalism". The March of Time's relationship to the newsreel was compared to the weekly interpretive news magazine's relationship to the daily newspaper.

"The March of Time style was characterized by dynamic editing, gutsy investigative reporting, and hard-punching, almost arrogant, narration," wrote film historian Ephraim Katz — who added that it "was beautifully parodied by Orson Welles in Citizen Kane."

From 1935 to 1938 Welles was a member of the prestigious and uncredited company of actors that presented the radio version of The March of Time, which preceded the film version. He was well versed in what came to be called "Time-speak", described by March of Time chronicler Raymond Fielding as "a preposterous kind of sentence structure in which subjects, predicates, adjectives, and other components of the English language all ended up in unpredictable and grammatically unauthorized positions." In News on the March, William Alland impersonated narrator Westbrook Van Voorhis: "Great imitation," Welles later said, "but he's pretty easy to imitate: 'This week, as it must to all men, death came to Charles Foster Kane.' We used to do that every day — five days a week!"

Welles screened the film for Luce: "He was one of the first people to see the movie," Welles said. "He and Clare Luce loved it and roared with laughter at the digest. They saw it as a parody and enjoyed it very much as such — I have to hand it to them." Welles had met Luce through Archibald MacLeish, and financial support from the Luces helped open the Mercury Theatre in November 1937.

Callow called the News on the March sequence "the single most impressive, most spoken-of element in the movie". Remarkably, critic Arthur Knight reported in 1969 that the sequence was excised from most prints presented on American television.
