= Voice of Doom (disambiguation) =

The Voice of Doom is a nickname for Lorne Greene from his work as the CBC's principal newsreader during World War II.

Voice of Doom may also refer to:

- Westbrook Van Voorhis (1903-1968), American radio, film and TV narrator
- "The Voice of Doom", a 1948 episode of The Adventures of Superman radio program
