= The Story of the Vatican =

1941 film directed by Jean Pages

- Directed by: Jean Pages
- Written by: Fulton J. Sheen
- Produced by: Richard de Rochemont
- Cinematography: Marcel Rebiere
- Edited by: Lothar Wolff
- Production company: The March of Time
- Distributed by: RKO Radio Pictures
- Release date: July 18, 1941
- Running time: 53 minutes
- Country: United States
- Language: English

The Story of the Vatican is a 1941 American documentary directed by Jean Pages. The film was written by and stars Fulton J. Sheen (who would later become an archbishop in the Roman Catholic Church), and was the second of only four full-length features produced by The March of Time, better known for their newsreels. It was distributed by RKO Radio Pictures, which released the film on July 18, 1941.

== See also ==
- Index of Vatican City-related articles
