= The Golden Twenties =

1950 documentary produced by Richard de Rochemont

- Theatrical release poster
- Written by: Frederick Lewis Allen; Samuel Wood Bryant
- Produced by: Richard de Rochemont; Samuel W. Bryant (associate)
- Narrated by: Frederick Lewis Allen; Robert Q. Lewis; Allen Prescott; Red Barber; Elmer Davis
- Cinematography: Jack Shaindlin
- Edited by: Leo Zochling
- Production company: Time Inc.
- Distributed by: RKO Radio Pictures
- Release date: April 8, 1950
- Running time: 68 minutes
- Country: United States
- Language: English

The Golden Twenties is a 1950 American documentary film, which used footage from the March of Time newsreels. It is the only film credited to Time Inc., although their newsreel division, the March of Time, produced four films, and this film was produced by the March of Time producer, Richard de Rochemont. While composed of existing footage, the film was narrated by five different people: Frederick Lewis Allen, Robert Q. Lewis, Allen Prescott, Red Barber, and Elmer Davis.

== Plot ==
A student at the New York Public Library is about to write a paper about the United States during the 1920s. Frederick Lewis Allen agrees to help him, and to utilize several other personalities to tell the youth about the decade. Utilizing footage from newsreels of the period, several narrators take the student from 1920 through 1929. Allen handles the narration when dealing with customs, Robert Q. Lewis deals with cultural events like films and plays, Allen Prescott covers the lighter moments of the decade, Red Barber covers sports, and Elmer Davis handles political issues.

We see the creation of the League of Nations, and the decision by the United States not to join. World War I heroes such as Alvin York, John J. Pershing and William Sims. Airplanes begin to make trans-oceanic flight, and the US Postal Service begins airmail delivery. The Eighteenth Amendment to the United States Constitution is passed, beginning Prohibition. Racial tensions rise in the country, and the Ku Klux Klan spreads. Union influence spreads, and strikes, sometimes violent, are carried out. The Sacco and Vanzetti trail received worldwide attention.

Gallagher and Shean, Ruth St. Denis, and Harry Houdini are incredibly popular, as are marathon dances. Other popular entertainers are highlighted, including Enrico Caruso, Charles Chaplin, Douglas Fairbanks Sr., Will Rogers, and Greta Garbo. Rudolph Valentino is also one of the most popular, and his death in 1926 drew thousands to his funeral. The Nineteenth Amendment to the United States Constitution was passed, giving women the right to vote. The Jazz Age began, which played a significant part in wider cultural changes in this period. To counter the increasing amount of sex and violence in films, movie producers hire Will Hays, who by the end of the decade developed the Motion Picture Production Code. Warren G. Harding is elected president.

The Scopes Monkey Trial, pits Clarence Darrow against William Jennings Bryan. Calvin Coolidge becomes president after Harding's death in 1923, and wins re-election in 1924, despite revelations of the Teapot Dome scandal.

Sports events which are covered include the rise of prominence of Babe Ruth and the New York Yankees; the success of Bobby Jones; Man o' War's success on the race track; football's Red Grange and Knute Rockne are the stars of their sport; Bill Tilden, Molla Mallory, Suzanne Lenglen, and Helen Wills dominated the tennis world. Johnny Weissmuller garnered the moniker of "fastest swimmer in the world", while Gertrude Ederle set a record for swimming the English Channel. Boxing saw the rise of "Kid Blackie", better known as Jack Dempsey, "The Manassa Mauler".

The arts saw the rise of writers like Michael Arlen, Joseph Conrad, H. G. Wells and John Galsworthy. While the music scene included the popularity of Lawrence Tibbett, Ernestine Schumann-Heink, Grace Moore, Marion Talley, George Gershwin, and Irving Berlin.

Prohibition sees the rise of gangsters like Al Capone. The Hall–Mills murder case captivated the nation's attention, as did the tragic death of Floyd Collins, who became trapped while exploring a cave system, and died after 18 days.

Charles Lindbergh does a solo crossing of the Atlantic. And the automotive industry begins to take off. The automobile industry booms. By the end of the decade, the Kellogg–Briand Pact is passed, which outlaws war as an instrument of national policy. Herbert Hoover follows Coolidge as president, and the prosperity of the nation is shattered by the stock market crash of 1929, which begins the Great Depression.

== Cast ==
- Frederick Lewis Allen – Narrator, manners and customs
- Elmer Davis – Narrator, politics
- Red Barber – Narrator, sports
- Robert Q. Lewis – Narrator, entertainment
- Allen Prescott – Narrator, lighter moments

== Bibliography ==
- Allen, Frederick Lewis (1931). Only Yesterday: An Informal History of the 1920s. New York: Harper and Row.
