= Youth in Crisis =

1943 film

- Produced by: Louis de Rochemont
- Production company: Time Inc.
- Distributed by: 20th Century Fox
- Release date: November 5, 1943
- Running time: 18 minutes
- Country: United States
- Language: English

Youth in Crisis is a 1943 American short documentary film produced by Louis de Rochemont as part of The March of Time series. It was nominated for a 1944 Academy Award for Best Documentary Short.
