= Show Business at War =

1943 film by Louis de Rochemont

- Directed by: Louis de Rochemont
- Produced by: Louis de Rochemont
- Starring: Irving Berlin; Alfred Lunt; Jack Benny; Olivia de Havilland; Marlene Dietrich; Deanna Durbin; Hedy Lamarr; Al Jolson; Eddie 'Rochester' Anderson; Carole Landis
- Distributed by: 20th Century Fox
- Release date: May 21, 1943
- Running time: 17 minutes
- Country: United States
- Language: English

Show Business at War is a short film made by The March of Time in 1943 to tout the United States film industry's contribution to the Second World War effort. It was a collaboration between several studios, directors and actors.

== Plot ==
Al Jolson sings “Mammy”; Phil Baker asks the $64 question; Kay Kyser gives a clue; Rochester upsets his boss Jack Benny while Mary Livingstone taunts him and Don Wilson laughs. Charlie McCarthy gets in Bergen’s hair, or tries to find it. Darryl Zanuck, a colonel in the Signals Corps, and only recently back from North Africa, and John Ford, a Commander in the Navy, also doing photographic work on many fronts, are featured too.

== Cast ==
The main credited stars are: Carole Lombard - Walt Disney - John Ford - Darryl F. Zanuck - Irving Berlin - Jack Benny - Olivia de Havilland - Marlene Dietrich - Deanna Durbin - Hedy Lamarr - Al Jolson - Carole Landis

A multitude of other stars are seen but uncredited.
