= A Chance to Live =

1949 film

- Theatrical release poster
- Directed by: James L. Shute
- Written by: James L. Shute
- Produced by: Richard De Rochemont; James L. Shute
- Production company: Time Inc.
- Distributed by: Twentieth Century-Fox
- Release date: December 23, 1949
- Running time: 18 minutes
- Country: United States
- Language: English

A Chance to Live is a 1949 American short documentary film directed by James L. Shute, produced by Richard de Rochemont for Time Inc. and distributed by Twentieth Century-Fox. It is part of The March of Time series and portrays Monsignor John Patrick Carroll-Abbing building and running a Boys' Home in Italy.

The film won an Oscar at the 22nd Academy Awards in 1950 for Documentary Short Subject. The Academy Film Archive preserved A Chance to Live in 2005.
