= Africa, Prelude to Victory =

1942 film

- Produced by: Office of War Information
- Production company: The March of Time
- Distributed by: Twentieth Century Fox
- Release date: December 4, 1942
- Running time: 22 minutes
- Country: United States
- Language: English

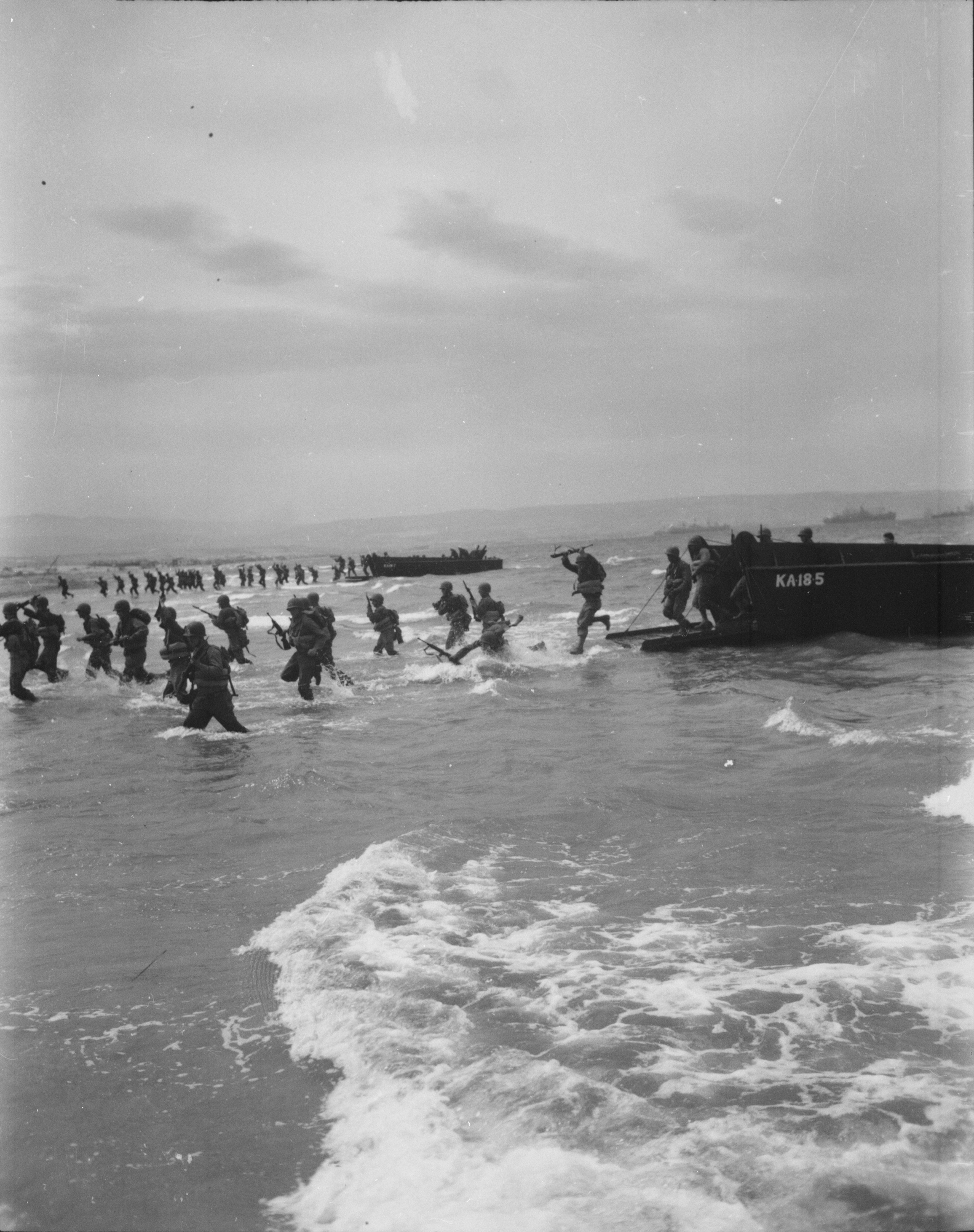
U.S. troops landing during an exercise near Algiers in April 1944

Africa, Prelude to Victory is a short dramatic propaganda film produced as part of the newsreel The March of Time. It shows the African campaigns of World War II. It was nominated for an Academy Award for Best Documentary Feature in 1943.

== See also ==
- List of Allied propaganda films of World War II
