= Inside Nazi Germany—1938 =

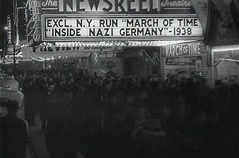
- Crowd in front of the Embassy Newsreel Theatre in New York City showing "Inside Nazi Germany—1938"
- Directed by: Jack Glenn
- Production company: Time Inc.
- Distributed by: RKO Radio Pictures
- Release date: January 18, 1938
- Running time: 16 minutes
- Country: United States
- Language: English

Inside Nazi Germany—1938 is a short documentary film, an episode of The March of Time newsreel series that was presented in American theaters beginning January 18, 1938. The film is an examination of Germany under Adolf Hitler that screened at a strongly non-interventionist time in America. Directed by Jack Glenn, it was inducted into the National Film Registry in 1993.

== Production ==
Advertisement in Motion Picture Daily (January 24, 1938)

Julien Bryan shot over 25,000 feet of film for the project.

== Release ==
The Chicago Board of Censors banned the film stating that it was "unfriendly to the German government", but Police Commissioner James P. Allman overruled them. Warner Bros. refused to show the film in any of its theaters.

== Reception ==
In 1993, Inside Nazi Germany—1938 was deemed "culturally significant" by the Library of Congress and selected for preservation in the United States National Film Registry.
