= Ted Jewett =

American radio actor and announcer (1904–1961)

Edward K. Jewett (1904–1961) was an American character actor. Jewett voiced characters, and served as an announcer on NBC Radio, CBS Radio, and Mutual Broadcasting during the Golden Age of Radio.

== Early life and education ==
Jewett was born in Yokohama, Japan in 1904. His father, John H. Jewett, worked in the Oriental silk trade, and served as Denmark's consul to Yokohama. Prince Valdemar, a friend of the Jewett family, named him to that post. Jewett grew up speaking both Japanese and Danish.

In 1910, Jewett moved to Plainfield, New Jersey with his parents. He attended local elementary and middle schools up until the age of 14. Jewett graduated from the Morristown School (now Morristown-Beard School) in Morristown, New Jersey in 1922. He then earned his bachelor's degree at Princeton University in Princeton, New Jersey.

During his school years, Jewett showed an interest in both elocution and public speaking. He aimed to work as an actor or statesman. However, Jewett transitioned into the silk trade after college. While working in the family business, he gained an interest in radio announcing.

== Radio career ==
Lacking a microphone, Jewett practiced announcing on the radio by using a tin can tied to a stick. He joined the announcing staff at NBC in 1930 after passing their microphone exam. The exam required him to speak a tongue-twister without stammering or whistling: "The seething sea ceaseth and thus the seething sea sufficeth us." He also had to demonstrate fluency in a foreign language. (Jewett was fluent in Japanese from his childhood years.)

Jewett passed the test despite having had no previous announcing experiences. In the fall of 1930, he joined the nighttime announcing staff at NBC after working as a daytime announcer for four months. Two years later, NBC promoted Jewett to supervisor of nighttime announcing and director of operations. He served in that role until 1934.

Jewett achieved notoriety for voicing characters on the series Cavalcade of America and The March of Time. Cavalcade of America was a DuPont-sponsored anthology drama series. The March of Time was the first dramatized newsreel to air on radio. The Time-sponsored program re-enacted real news events with accompanying musical tunes and sound effects. Jewett also appeared on Jolly Bill and Jane, Ellen Randolph, Chicago Theater of the Air, and G. E. Circle. During the 1940s, he served as an announcer for Robert Ripley's show Believe It or Not. He also served as an announcer for Let's Pretend, a children's show on CBS radio.

In 1931, Jewett served as one of the announcers of the U.S. Army's mimic battle over Manhattan Island. The nationally broadcast mimic battle demonstrated what a war-time attack on New York City might look like. It involved 672 airplanes crewed by 1,484 military personnel swooping over the city's skyscrapers. Jewett announced the mimic battle from a transport plane. Later that year, he had a car accident while traveling to announce the departure of Charles Lindbergh to Japan. The accident near North Beach Airport in Queens put Jewett in the hospital.

== Vocal impressions ==
During his career, Jewett's most known vocal impressions included those of:

- Kansas Governor Alf Landon, the 1936 Republican Presidential Candidate
- Japanese Emperor Hirohito
- British Prime Minister Neville Chamberlain
- New York Governor Alfred E. Smith, the 1928 Democratic Presidential Candidate
- U.S. Postmaster General James Farley
- Journalist Heywood Broun
- British Prime Minister Stanley Baldwin
- CBS CEO William S. Paley
- Conductor Walter Damrosch, the director of the New York Symphony Orchestra
- Author Albert Payson Terhune

== Family ==
Jewett married Grace Elizabeth Fisher, a violinist with the Parnassus Trio, in 1931. After she died from polio, he married Winnefred Jewett. They had a daughter together, Priscilla.

Grace Elizabeth Fisher was the daughter of Alexander Sibbald Fisher and Sarah Murrey. see NYC marriage record.
