= The March of Time =

American short film series (1935–1951)

- Intertitle
- Based on: The March of Time by Roy E. Larsen and Fred Smith
- Produced by: Roy E. Larsen; Louis de Rochemont; Richard de Rochemont
- Narrated by: Westbrook Van Voorhis
- Production company: Time Inc.
- Distributed by: First Division Pictures (1935); RKO Radio Pictures (1935–1942); 20th Century-Fox (1942–1951)
- Running time: 15–30 minutes
- Country: United States

The March of Time is an American newsreel series sponsored by Time Inc. and shown in movie theaters from 1935 to 1951. It was based on a radio news series broadcast from 1931 to 1945 that was produced by advertising agency Batten, Barton, Durstine & Osborn (BBDO). The "voice" of both series was Westbrook Van Voorhis. Produced and written by Louis de Rochemont and his brother Richard de Rochemont, The March of Time was recognized with an Academy Honorary Award in 1937.

The March of Time organization also produced four feature films for theatrical release, and created documentary series for early television. Its first TV series, Crusade in Europe (1949), received a Peabody Award and one of the first Emmy Awards.

== Production ==
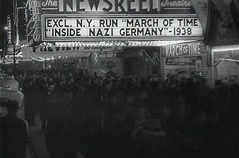
Marquee of the Embassy Newsreel Theatre during its exclusive New York City run of Inside Nazi Germany—1938, a short film later inducted into the National Film Registry

The March of Time was based on a news documentary and dramatization series, also called The March of Time, that was first broadcast on CBS Radio in 1931. Produced by Madison Avenue advertising agency, Batten, Barton, Durstine & Osborn (BBDO), the series was designed to cross promote Time magazine on the radio. Usually called a newsreel series, The March of Time was actually a monthly series of short feature films twice the length of standard newsreels. The films were didactic, with a subjective point of view. The editors of Time described it as "pictorial journalism". Like its radio namesake, The March of Time included reporting, on-location shots, and dramatic reenactments. The March of Time's relationship to the newsreel was compared to the weekly interpretive news magazine's relationship to the daily newspaper.

The March of Time was launched February 1, 1935, in over 500 theaters. Each entry in the series was either a two- or three-reel film (20 or 30 minutes). Westbrook Van Voorhis, who hosted the radio program, served as narrator of the film series. The series, which finally totalled close to 200 segments, was an immediate success with audiences. Because of its high production costs—estimated at $50,000 per episode, released at the rate of about one episode per month—the series was a money loser. However, it remained in production for six years beyond the cancellation of the radio show on which it was based.

The films were originally distributed by First Division Pictures, an independent distributor of minor-studio product. Major studio RKO Radio Pictures took over distribution in August 1935, and 20th Century-Fox began releasing the series in September 1942. At its peak The March of Time was seen by 25 million U.S. moviegoers a month.

"Implicit in all March of Time issues was a kind of uncomplicated American liberalism — general good intentions, a healthy journalistic skepticism, faith in enlightened self-interest, and substantial pride in American progress and potential", wrote March of Time chronicler Raymond Fielding:

The men who made the March of Time were not political theorists, they were journalists. For them, fascism, communism, and native demagogues seemed foreign to the American ethic, and they exposed and attacked them accordingly. … A cinematic agent provocateur, the March of Time turned over a lot of rocks, both at home and abroad, and illuminated the creatures it found beneath them. The demagogues and quacks whom they attacked in the 1930s may seem like obvious targets now, but they didn't seem so then. They were popular, powerful, frightening people, and the March of Time stood entirely alone in theatrical motion picture circles as a muckraker.

In late 1936, producer Roy E. Larsen reluctantly left The March of Time to serve as publisher of Life, a weekly news magazine that began publication in November 1936. Time executives had long vacillated over launching such a magazine, but the success of The March of Time's experiments in pictorial journalism overcame the hesitation of the corporation's board of directors. Larsen proposed that the new magazine be named The March of Time, but the name Life was purchased from the owners of a declining periodical. Life magazine was a great success and notable influence on photojournalism throughout its 36-year history.

Louis de Rochemont succeeded Larsen as producer of The March of Time, while Larsen continued to supervise the operations of the series on behalf of the Time corporation.

Examining the subjects of The March of Time, series historian Raymond Fielding found that episodes dealing with a single country and its affairs comprised 32.6 to 36 percent of the entire series. Economic issues were the subject of 10 percent of the episodes, and domestic politics 5 percent. Between 1935 and 1942, approximately 24 percent of the episodes were about war or the threat of war; from December 1941 until the end of World War II nearly every episode dealt with war.

"Although the March of Time was professedly nonpartisan, a clear and persistent antifascist tone was becoming apparent in its analysis of world politics and rising militarism", Fielding wrote. "'Rehearsal for War' [August 6, 1937] was unquestionably anti-Franco, which was exactly what liberal staff members had intended."

During Louis de Rochemont's tenure (1935–1943), 14 percent of the March of Time episodes were about the impact of specific individuals on political, economic and military events — a number that dropped significantly after his departure. De Rochemont's particular interest in the geopolitical role of the world's waterways resulted in 7.5 percent of all episodes devoted to the subject.

The March of Time film series ended in 1951, when the widespread adoption of television and daily TV news shows made the newsreel format obsolete. Newsreel series such as Pathé News (1910–1956), Paramount News (1927–1957), Fox Movietone News (1928–1963), Hearst Metrotone News/News of the Day (1914–1967), and Universal Newsreel (1929–1967) continued for a while longer.

== Episodes ==
Unless noted, sources for episode information are The March of Time, 1935–1951 by Raymond Fielding, and the HBO Archive's summary of The March of Time newsreels. Episodes 1.1–1.4 were distributed by First Division Pictures; episodes 1.5–8.13 were distributed by RKO Pictures; episodes 9.1–17.6 were distributed by 20th Century-Fox.

Volume + issue	U.S. release date	Title	Length	Notes
1.1	February 1, 1935	Saionji; Speakeasy Street; Belisha Beacons; Moe Buchsbaum; Fred Perkins; Metropolitan Opera	4:14; 2:32; 3:02; 1:56; 3:28; 5:48	Prince Saionji counsels Japan's leaders The 21 Club frustrates federal agents during Prohibition; Britain's transport ministry erects traffic lights despite hostility U.S. tourist agrees to pay fine in France under one condition Manufacturer defies NRA wage-scale directives on principle Giulio Gatti-Casazza retires; first sound pictures of the Met
1.2	March 8, 1935	Germany; New York Daily News; Leadbelly; Mohawk Disaster; Speed Camera	6:07; 4:20; 3:29; 5:24; 1:52	Adolf Hitler's rise to power and preparations for war Scooping competitors with news of the Bruno Hauptmann sentence Folk songs of Huddie Ledbetter preserved by the Library of Congress; Three consecutive sea disasters prompt consideration of International Safety Code; Harold Eugene Edgerton's new slow-motion camera
1.3	April 19, 1935	Huey Long; Munitions; Mexico; Trans-Pacific	5:56; 3:51; 4:08; 7:23	Satirical study of Huey Long; Basil Zaharoff attends secret conference of munitions manufacturers at Cannes; Suppression of freedom of religion in Mexico by Plutarco Elías Calles; Pan American Airways's Sikorsky S-42 flying boats provide service to China
1.4	May 31, 1935	Navy War Games; Russia; Washington News	8:08; 9:11; 5:01	United States Navy war games in the Pacific; Review of the Soviet experiment, as Joseph Stalin attempts to unify Russia; The Washington press corps at work, featuring Arthur Krock
1.5	August 16, 1935	Army; Croix de Feu; Father Coughlin	9:17; 8:17; 5:43	General Douglas MacArthur leads Army maneuvers in a simulated invasion of the U.S. Militant French fascist organization Croix-de-Feu forms and grows Portrait of politically outspoken radio evangelist Father Charles Coughlin
1.6	September 20, 1935	Bootleg Coal; Civilian Conservation Corps; Ethiopia	5:47; 7:27; 7:13	Pennsylvania miners on strike dig coal from closed mines to survive CCC camps save both the land and unemployed youth of America; British build dam for Emperor Haile Selassie as Italy mobilizes for war
1.7	October 18, 1935	Neutrality; Palestine; Safety ("— And Sudden Death"); Summer Theatres	5:14; 7:50; 4:53; 3:30	With the invasion of Ethiopia, the U.S. embargoes arms sales to belligerents Nazi oppression drives Jews into Tel Aviv; Dramatic staging of J. C. Furnas's Reader's Digest article on auto accidents Young actors including Henry Fonda, Margaret Sullavan and Katharine Hepburn
1.8	November 13, 1935	G.O.P. Strikebreaking; Wild Ducks	7:13; 5:07; 6:55	Herbert Hoover and fellow Republicans prepare for the 1936 Presidential election Methods of professional strikebreaker Pearl Bergoff during the textile workers strike Review of U.S. Biological Survey efforts to preserve migratory waterfowl
1.9	December 13, 1935	Japan–China; Narcotics; Townsend Plan	8:01; 7:37; 6:59	Japanese occupation of China and formation of the puppet state of Manchukuo; Federal Bureau of Narcotics works to stop cocaine smuggling into New Orleans; Francis Townsend's revolving old-age pension alternative to Social Security
2.1	January 7, 1936	Pacific Islands; Deibler; TVA	6:10; 3:51; 8:29	Bureau of Air Commerce colonizes uninhabited Pacific islands Portrait of Anatole Deibler, France's executioner-in-chief Profile of the Tennessee Valley Authority
2.2	February 14, 1936	Father Divine; Hartman Discovery; Moscow	6:36; 5:17; 8:07	Religious organization and theories of spiritual leader Father Divine; Dr. Leroy L. Hartman invents new painkilling technique for dentistry Study of life in the Soviet Union
2.3	March 13, 1936	Devil's Island; Tokyo, Japan; Fisheries	6:09; 5:00; 6:13	Prisoners in French Guiana; Study of political revolt and killing of government officials by army officers New England fishermen fear losing Canadian tariff
2.4	April 17, 1936	Florida Canal; Arson Squads in Action; Field Trials; Veterans of Future Wars	6:04; 6:11; 4:27; 5:34	Angry debate over construction of the Cross Florida Barge Canal; Dramatization of fire marshal Thomas P. Brophy solving arson case in Brooklyn; Hunting and sporting dog trials in Tennessee; Princeton University student organization proposes bonuses for future military service
2.5	May 15, 1936	League of Nations Union; Railroads; Relief	7:14; 8:04; 5:34	Critical look at the weakened League of Nations and worsening international relations Uncertain future of railroad industry Dramatizations depict the decreasing national relief fund
2.6	June 12, 1936	Otto von Habsburg; Texas Centennial; Crime School	6:52; 6:42; 8:45	Archduke Otto of Austria in exile Satirical study of the Texas Centennial Exposition; Fictional case history of a poor New York boy who becomes a criminal
2.7	June 12, 1936	Revolt in France; An American Dictator; Jockey Club	6:40; 5:47; 8:18	Social and political shifts in France since World War I Exposé of Rafael Trujillo; The Jockey Club sets horse racing policies and investigates illegal practices
2.8	August 7, 1936	Albania's King Zog; Highway Homes; King Cotton's Slaves	6:25; 6:31; 7:40	Profile of Albania and King Zog I Trailers are used for camping, recreation and affordable homes Brutal economic conditions under which Southern sharecropper families live
3.1	September 2, 1936	Passamaquoddy; The 'Lunatic Fringe'; U.S. Milky Way	8:08; 6:59; 6:51	The Public Works Administration's Quoddy Dam Project for eastern Maine; Gerald L. K. Smith, Father Divine, Francis Townsend and Charles Coughlin; Dramatization of 1893 milk-borne typhoid epidemic; current dairy farming practices
3.2	September 30, 1936	England's Tithe War; Labor versus Labor; The Football Business	7:31; 7:22 n/a	Church of England tithe law is an intolerable burden on farmers during the Depression; John L. Lewis of the United Mine Workers breaks away from the AFL to form the CIO; The amateur sport of college football is becoming big business
3.3	November 6, 1936	The Presidency; New Schools for Old	11:29; 8:29	FDR reelected; review of first term and speculation on second term The U.S. public school system celebrates its centennial; John Dewey speaks
3.4	November 27, 1936	A Soldier-King's Son; St. Lawrence Seaway; An Uncle Sam Production	6:30; 5:35; 9:17	Young King Leopold III of Belgium rules a country facing Nazi aggression from Germany and within U.S. and Canadian efforts to open a binational deep waterway for trade through the Great Lakes face opposition The Federal Theatre Project works to revitalize an industry ravaged by the Great Depression
3.5	December 24, 1936	China's Dictator Kidnapped; Business Girls in the Big City	9:57; 8:01	Chiang Kai-shek is kidnapped by Manchurian ruler Zhang Xueliang; Women in business and industry, the professions and government; profiles include Edna Woolman Chase, Erma Perham Proetz, Josephine Roche and Frances Perkins
3.6	January 22, 1937	Conquering Cancer; Midwinter Vacations; Mormonism	6:01; 6:56; 5:56	The history and nature of cancer and the progress being made to combat it; profile of accused quack Norman G. Baker; Advertising agencies promote winter vacations in Florida; winter resorts attempt to attract tourist revenue Brief overview of the Church of Jesus Christ of Latter-day Saints in Utah
3.7	February 19, 1937	Father of All Turks; Birth of Swing; Enemies of Alcohol	3:38; 6:39; 5:51	Turkey is Westernized under Mustafa Kemal Atatürk; Swing music's roots in New Orleans jazz; Nick LaRocca reunites the Original Dixieland Jass Band and performs "Tiger Rag"; Post-Prohibition resurgence of the liquor business faces two enemies — bootlegging and the temperance movement
3.8	March 19, 1937	Child Labor; Coronation Crisis; Harlem's Black Magic	6:10; 7:51; 5:03	Three presidents advocate a Child Labor Amendment to the U.S. Constitution; Lloyd's of London pays off on business losses due to the abdication of Edward VIII, and defunct souvenirs find a ready market in the U.S. The New York World-Telegram exposes voodoo worship in Harlem as a racket for confidence men
3.9	April 16, 1937	Amateur Sleuths; Britain's Food Defenses; The Supreme Court	5:44; 6:25; 8:10	Volunteer sleuth clubs organized to help police solve crimes Facing a military shortage due to malnourishment, Britain campaigns and trains for physical fitness FDR combats legal challenges to New Deal innovations, including the Wagner Act, with an attempt to reform the Supreme Court
3.10	May 14, 1937	Irish Republic — 1937; Puzzle Prizes; U.S. Unemployed	7:09; 5:12; 6:33	With a new Constitution and the leadership of President Éamon de Valera, Ireland works to become self-sufficient through industrialization Legal contests, puzzles and lotteries like the Irish Sweepstakes gain popularity David Lasser's Worker's Alliance pressures U.S. legislators to combat unemployment; the WPA needs increased funding
3.11	June 11, 1937	Dogs for Sale; Dust Bowl; Poland and War	5:49; 6:02; 5:43	Catering to dog owners is big business; The Seeing Eye trains service dogs for the blind, and new legislation will lift restrictions With more than nine million acres of U.S. farmland suffering major soil erosion, the USDA aggressively promotes planting and plowing methods that restore ecological balance Historical overview includes the accomplishments of General Pilsudski and his successor, growing anti-Semitism and changing regional conditions
3.12	July 9, 1937	Babies Wanted; Rockefeller Millions; The 49th State?	4:59; 4:48; 7:08	More families seek to adopt as the U.S. birth rate declines; agencies improve childcare and screening methods The philanthropy of John D. Rockefeller Jr., and the Rockefeller Foundation; The key role of Hawaii in the defense of the U.S., and its campaign for statehood
3.13	August 6, 1937	Rehearsal for War; The Spoils System; Youth in Camps	6:12; 5:57; 5:48	The U.S. looks for lessons in the Spanish Civil War as it prepares for future conflicts Efforts to rid the United States civil service system of nepotism and patronage Summer resident camps for underprivileged American children offer good food, exercise, competitive sports and outdoor skills
4.1	September 10, 1937	Pests of 1937; War in China	5:09; 12:38	
4.2	October 1, 1937	England's D.O.R.A. Fiorello LaGuardia; Junk and War	4:51; 10:17; 3:55	
4.3	October 29, 1937	Amoskeag-Success Story; Crisis in Algeria; U.S. Secret Service	6:21; 6:59; 5:09	
4.4	November 26, 1937	Britain's Gambling Fever; Alaska's Salmon War; The Human Heart	n/a 7:33; 6:33	
4.5	December 27, 1937	The Laugh Industry; Ships-Strikes-Seamen	5:00 n/a	
4.6	January 18, 1938	Inside Nazi Germany—1938	16:00	Examination of Germany under Adolf Hitler that screened at a strongly non-interventionist time in America; 1993 inductee for National Film Registry
4.7	February 18, 1938	Old Dixie's New Boom; One Million Missing; Russians in Exile	7:31; 5:27; 5:34	
4.8	March 18, 1938	Arms and the League; Brain Trust Island	7:06; 11:02	
4.9	April 15, 1938	Nazi Conquest — No. 1 Crime and Prisons	10:44; 9:37	
4.10	May 13, 1938	England's Bankrupt Peers; Friend of the People; Racketeers vs. Housewives	5:08; 7:22; 6:21	
4.11	June 10, 1938	Men of Medicine	16:07	
4.12	July 8, 1938	G-Men of the Sea	16:12	
4.13	August 6, 1938	Man at the Wheel; Threat to Gibraltar	11:57; 6:39	
5.1	September 2, 1938	Father Divine's Deal; Prelude to Conquest	9:18; 10:40	
5.2	September 30, 1938	The British Dilemma; U.S. Firefighters	10:40; 6:38	
5.3	October 28, 1938	Inside the Maginot Line	19:42	
5.4	November 25, 1938	Uncle Sam: The Good Neighbor	17:44	
5.5	December 23, 1938	The Refugee — Today and Tomorrow	16:53	
5.6	January 20, 1939	State of the Nation — 1939	17:01	
5.7	February 1939	Mexico's New Crisis; Young America	9:43; 8:56	
5.8	March 1939	The Mediterranean — Background for War	17:38	
5.9	April 1939	Japan — Master of the Orient	17:57	
5.10	May 1939	Dixie — U.S.A.	18:09	
5.11	June 1939	War, Peace, Propaganda	18:11	
5.12	July 1939	The Movies March On!	20:58	
5.13	August 1939	Metropolis	17:33	
6.1	September 1939	Soldiers with Wings	18:07	
6.2	September 1939	Battle Fleets of England	17:59	
6.3	October 1939	Uncle Sam — The Farmer	17:21	
6.4	November 1939	Newsfronts of War — 1940	18:16	
6.5	December 1939	Crisis in the Pacific — 1940	17:10	
6.6	January 1940	The Republic of Finland 1919–1940	17:25	
6.7	February 1940	The Vatican of Pius XII	17:54	
6.8	March 1940	Canada at War	17:25	
6.9	April 1940	America's Youth	18:16	
6.10	May 1940	The Philippines: 1898–1946	18:16	
6.11	June 1940	The U.S. Navy — 1940	17:37	
6.12	August 1940	Spoils of Conquest	16:44	
6.13	August 1940	Gateways to Panama	19:09	
7.1	September 1940	On Foreign Newsfronts	18:10	
7.2	October 1940	Britain's R.A.F.	17:29	
7.3	October 1940	Mexico — Good Neighbor's Dilemma	18:18	
7.4	November 1940	Arms and the Men — U.S.A.	18:28	
7.5	December 1940	Labor and Defense — U.S.A.	18:02	
7.6	January 1941	Uncle Sam — The Non-Belligerent	20:36	
7.7	February 1941	Americans All	16:25	
7.8	March 1941	Australia at War	18:44	Australia's contribution to the war in Europe and the prospect of a war with Japan; overview of the assets of its British, Dutch and American allies in the South West Pacific Area
7.9	April 1941	Men of the F.B.I. — 1941	20:34	
7.10	May 1941	Crisis in the Atlantic	16:47	
7.11	June 1941	China Fights Back	17:37	
7.12	August 1941	New England's Eight Million Yankees	19:39	
7.13	August 1941	Peace — by Adolf Hitler	17:30	
8.1	August 1941	Thumbs Up, Texas!	18:30	
8.2	September 1941	Norway in Revolt	19:40	Academy Award nominee
8.3	October 1941	Sailors with Wings	19:22	
8.4	November 1941	Main Street — U.S.A.	17:09	
8.5	December 1941	Our America at War	16:54	
Special Issue	December 1941	Battlefields of the Pacific	n/a	
8.6	January 1942	When Air Raids Strike	19:13	
8.7	February 1942	Far East Command	17:05	
8.8	March 1942	The Argentine Question	18:27	
8.9	April 1942	America's New Army	16:10	
8.10	May 1942	India in Crisis	18:31	
8.11	June 1942	India at War	18:33	
8.12	July 1942	Men in Washington — 1942	19:00	
8.13	July 1942	Men of the Fleet (The Ocean Fronts)	17:15	
9.1	September 1942	The F.B.I. Front	19:34	
9.2	October 1942	The Fighting French	n/a	
9.3	November 1942	Mr. and Mrs. America	19:43	
9.4	December 4, 1942	Africa - Prelude to Victory	17:35	Academy Award nominee
9.5	December 1942	The Navy and the Nation	18:53	
9.6	January 1943	One Day of War — Russia 1943	21:04	
9.7	February 1943	The New Canada	17:23	
9.8	March 1943	America's Food Crisis	17:47	
9.9	April 1943	Inside Fascist Spain	16:47	
9.10	May 1943	Show Business at War	17:34	
9.11	June 1943	Invasion!	17:53	
9.12	July 1943	Bill Jack vs. Adolf Hitler	17:37	
9.13	August 1943	And Then Japan	17:36	
10.1	September 1943	Airways to Peace	16:27	
10.2	October 1943	Portugal — Europe's Crossroads	18:25	
10.3	November 1943	Youth in Crisis	17:49	Academy Award nominee
10.4	December 1943	Naval Log of Victory	18:56	
10.5	December 1943	Upbeat in Music	16:53	
10.6	January 1944	Sweden's Middle Road	18:42	
10.7	February 1944	Post-War Jobs	18:00	
10.8	March 1944	South American Front — 1944	17:07	
10.9	April 1944	The Irish Question	18:35	
10.10	May 1944	Underground Report	19:19	
10.11	June 1944	Back Door to Tokyo	17:40	
10.12	July 1944	Americans All	n/a	
10.13	August 1944	British Imperialism	17:42	
11.1	September 1944	Post-War Farms	16:37	
11.2	October 1944	What To Do with Germany	18:25	
11.3	November 1944	Uncle Sam, Mariner?	16:23	
11.4	December 1944	Inside China Today	16:53	
11.5	December 1944	The Unknown Battle	18:07	
11.6	January 1945	Report on Italy	16:28	
11.7	February 1945	The West Coast Question	16:15	
11.8	March 1945	Memo from Britain	16:00	
11.9	April 1945	The Returning Veteran	n/a	
11.10	May 1945	Spotlight on Congress	15:19	
11.11	June 15, 1945	Teen-Age Girls	16:28	
11.12	July 13, 1945	Where's the Meat?	16:08	
11.13	August 10, 1945	The New U.S. Frontier	16:08	
12.1	September 17, 1945	Palestinian Problem	n/a	
12.2	October 5, 1945	American Beauty	17:23	
12.3	November 2, 1945	18 Million Orphans	16:43	
12.4	November 30, 1945	Justice Comes to Germany	20:11	
12.5	December 28, 1945	Challenge to Hollywood	17:11	
12.6	January 25, 1946	Life with Baby	18:42	
12.7	February 22, 1946	Report on Greece	18:22	
12.8	March 22, 1946	Night Club Boom	20:38	
12.9	April 19, 1946	Wanted — More Homes	20:19	
12.10	May 17, 1946	Tomorrow's Mexico	19:31	
12.11	June 14, 1946	Problem Drinkers	19:19	
12.12	July 12, 1946	The New France	18:55	
12.13	August 9, 1946	Atomic Power	18:25	Academy Award nominee
13.1	September 27, 1946	Is Everybody Happy?	16:26	
13.2	October 4, 1946	World Food Production	16:50	
13.3	November 1, 1946	The Soviet's Neighbor — Czechoslovakia	17:18	
13.4	November 29, 1946	The American Cop	17:39	
13.5	December 27, 1946	Nobody's Children	16:20	
13.6	January 24, 1947	Germany — Handle with Care!	17:36	
13.7	February 21, 1947	Fashion Means Business	n/a	
13.8	March 21, 1947	The Teachers' Crisis	15:45	
13.9	April 18, 1947	Storm over Britain	17:49	
13.10	May 16, 1947	The Russians Nobody Knows	18:15	
13.11	June 13, 1947	Your Doctors — 1947	18:24	
13.12	July 11, 1947	New Trains for Old?	18:05	
13.13	August 8, 1947	Turkey's 100 Million	17:49	
14.1	September 6, 1947	Is Everybody Listening?	18:05	
14.2	October 3, 1947	T-Men in Action	17:06	
14.3	October 30, 1947	End of an Empire?	17:53	
14.4	November 28, 1947	Public Relations — This Means You	16:03	
14.5	December 26, 1947	The Presidential Year	15:18	
14.6	January 23, 1948	The Cold War: Act I — France	17:57	
14.7	February 20, 1948	Marriage and Divorce	16:23	
14.8	March 19, 1948	The Cold War: Act II — Crisis in Italy	16:22	
14.9	April 16, 1948	Life with Junior	17:44	
14.10	May 14, 1948	The Cold War: Act III — Battle for Greece	16:43	
14.11	June 11, 1948	The Fight Game	n/a	
14.12	July 9, 1948	The Case of Mrs. Conrad	17:5	
14.13	August 6, 1948	White-Collar Girls	16:23	
14.14	September 3, 1948	Life with Grandpa	16:14	
14.15	October 1, 1948	Battle for Germany	17:40	
14.16	October 29, 1948	America's New Air Power	17:15	
14.17	November 26, 1948	Answer to Stalin	18:15	
14.18	December 24, 1948	Watchdogs of the Mail	17:37	
15.1	January 21, 1949	On Stage	17:44	
15.2	February 18, 1949	Asia's New Voice	16:51	
15.3	March 18, 1949	Wish You Were Here	16:57	
15.4	April 15, 1949	Report on the Atom	18:24	
15.5	May 13, 1949	Sweden Looks Ahead	17:06	
15.6	June 10, 1949	It's in the Groove	18:22	
15.7	July 8, 1949	Stop — Heavy Traffic!	15:04	
15.8	August 5, 1949	Farming Pays Off	16:27	
15.9	September 2, 1949	Policeman's Holiday	18:45	
15.10	September 30, 1949	The Fight for Better Schools	19:44	
15.11	November 11, 1949	MacArthur's Japan	17:04	
15.12	December 23, 1949	A Chance to Live	18:11	Boys Town of Italy aids destitute children after WWII; Academy Award Winner; preserved by the Academy Film Archive in 2005
16.1	February 3, 1950	Mid-Century — Half-Way to Where?	16:20	
16.2	March 17, 1950	The Male Look	15:33	
16.3	April 28, 1950	Where's the Fire?	18:29	
16.4	June 9, 1950	Beauty at Work	17:10	
16.5	August 18, 1950	As Russia Sees It	15:36	
16.6	September 29, 1950	The Gathering Storm	15:52	
16.7	November 10, 1950	Schools March On!	17:49	
16.8	December 1950	Tito — New Ally?	17:12	
17.1	February 1951	Strategy for Victory	16:56	
17.2	March 1951	Flight Plan for Freedom	18:22	
17.3	April 1951	The Nation's Mental Health	18:21	
17.4	June 1951	Moroccan Outpost	16:47	
17.5	July 1951	Crisis in Iran	17:58	
17.6	August 1951	Formosa — Island of Promise	16:30	

== Reviews and commentary ==
- Writing for The Spectator in 1935, Graham Greene favorably contrasted the film with contemporary British news films whose stories he described as "scraps of unimportant material [...] flung without arrangement on to the screen". Praising the producers of The March of Time, Greene suggested that "their fortnightly programmes can be compared with an authoritative article by a special correspondent rather than with a haphazard page of photographs from the Daily Mirror", and went on to discuss the danger of censorship for this nascent news medium in light of England's stronger libel laws and the British Board of Film Censors' decision to severely cut scenes of the Parisian riots related to the Croix de Feu, and to remove the film's final scene revealing the source of the Croix de Feu's funding - an act of censorship that Greene noted as making the film "Fascist in tone".
- Alistair Cooke, The Listener (November 20, 1935) — The March of Time is not the result of bright inspiration. Behind it is ten years' experience with a magazine of the same style; an army of correspondents and cameramen scattered throughout the world; an historical film library it took two years to prepare; a newspaper cutting library as exhaustive as anything extant; and in New York and Chicago a vast research staff alert to trace the origins of any family, war, author, statesman, treaty, or breath or rumour. With no less than this should any other film company irresponsibly compete.
- Bosley Crowther, The New York Times (October 31, 1937) — And now, less than three years old but already an institution, the March of Time is today one of the most successful and forward-looking features on the screen — a dynamic force for the purveyance of information through the medium of the film.
- D. A. Spencer and H. D. Waley, The Cinema Today (1939) — Although the ideal behind these films is to present, as objectively as possible, accounts of world happenings, there is no doubt whatever that they are helping to mould our views on such happenings. In America legislation regulating child labour … has at last passed both Houses of Congress by a narrow margin which is believed to be due to the March of Time. Their film on cancer has done a good deal to arouse the national conscience of America to the evils of the quackery that battens on fear of this scourge, while in England, before the present campaign for National Fitness was under way, their film Food and Physical Training aroused enormous interest and debate in that it brought home to many people's minds the fact that the animals at the zoo are better fed and housed than many of the nation's children.
- Neil Genzlinger, The New York Times (September 2, 2010) — It's hard to know today even what to call these films. (Raymond Fielding, a retired college educator who wrote a book about the series, told me that roughly 290 were made.) '"Newsreels'" seems inadequate; they are longer, more detailed and much more opinionated than the standard-issue newsreels that preceded them. "Documentaries" is closer, but the blaring orchestrations and outlandish voice-overs sound nothing like a modern documentary. It's tempting to give up and label these whats-its a mass-media Neanderthal — an evolutionary dead end; an attempt to merge the tools of newsgathering and filmmaking that had its moment but died out. Except that, once you watch a few and learn about how they were made, you start to see a little March of Time in almost everything: Fox News, The Daily Show with Jon Stewart, the History channel, schlocky reality shows of the I Shouldn't Be Alive variety, PBS's P.O.V.
- Tom Shales, The Washington Post (September 4, 2010) — Fascinating, enthralling, enlightening—many a superlative applies to these documentary shorts, which have gathered value with the march of time itself and have been rescued from the ravages of time by New York's Museum of Modern Art and the HBO Archive, corporate relative of the series's original creators. … It's something of an irony that The March of Time may be less famous today than a bull's-eye parody of it — a parody that millions have seen, many of them perhaps not even knowing that it is a parody or what it's lampooning. Does News on the March ring a bell? It's the title of the fake-out newsreel that begins the Orson Welles classic Citizen Kane, and it includes wily duplications of all the March of Time trademarks, including the white-on-black transitional title cards, the wall-to-wall musical score and the bombastic narration.

== Awards and recognition ==
- The March of Time received an honorary Academy Award in 1937 "for its significance to motion pictures and for having revolutionized one of the most important branches of the industry — the newsreel."
- On October 27, 1937, The March of Time episode "Conquering Cancer" received the first Clement Cleveland Medal, established by the New York City Cancer Committee of the American Society for the Control of Cancer. "Louis de Rochemont was especially proud of a letter he received from U.S. Surgeon General Parran crediting the film with providing a crucial influence in securing a federal appropriation for the National Cancer Institute", reported March of Time chronicler Raymond Fielding.
- The March of Time episode Norway in Revolt was nominated for an Academy Award for Best Documentary (Short Subject) in 1941.
- Prelude to Victory was nominated for an Academy Award for Best Documentary (Short Subject) in 1942.
- Youth in Crisis was nominated for an Academy Award for Best Documentary (Short Subject) in 1943.
- Atomic Power was nominated for an Academy Award for Best Documentary (Short Subject) in 1946.
- A Chance to Live received the Academy Award for Best Documentary (Short Subject) in 1949.
- Inside Nazi Germany, a 1938 March of Time episode directed by Jack Glenn, was an inductee of the 1993 National Film Registry list in 1993.

== Feature films ==
Four feature-length films were produced by The March of Time.

- The Ramparts We Watch (August 1940, 99 minutes)
- The Story of the Vatican (August 1941, 53 minutes)
- We Are the Marines (December 1942, 70 minutes)
- The Golden Twenties (April 1950, 67 minutes)

== Television ==
In 1949 The March of Time created the first extensive documentary series for television, Crusade in Europe, based on the book by Dwight D. Eisenhower. The ABC series received a Peabody Award and one of the first Emmy Awards (Best Public Service, Cultural or Educational Program). It was followed by Crusade in the Pacific (1951).

In 1965–1966, producer David L. Wolper revived the March of Time title for a series of documentary films produced in association with Time-Life, Inc. The series was not successful.

== Cultural references ==
Dorothy Fields' lyrics for the song "A Fine Romance", introduced by Fred Astaire and Ginger Rogers in the 1936 RKO film Swing Time, include a reference to the newsreel series:

A fine romance, with no kisses.
A fine romance, my friend, this is.
True love should have the thrills that a healthy crime has.
We don't have half the thrills that The March of Time has.

The March of Dimes, a fundraising organization that still exists, was named by Eddie Cantor in 1938 as a play on The March of Time. Because Franklin D. Roosevelt founded the March of Dimes, originally called the National Foundation for Infantile Paralysis, a dime was chosen to honor him after his death.

The March of Time series was satirized in Orson Welles's film Citizen Kane (1941) with the News on the March segment showing the life and funeral of the fictional Charles Foster Kane.

The Canadian documentary series The World in Action (1942–1945) was patterned after The March of Time newsreel series.
