= We Are the Marines =

1942 film by Louis de Rochemont

- Directed by: Louis De Rochemont
- Produced by: Louis De Rochemont
- Cinematography: Richard W. Maedler
- Edited by: John Dullaghan; Elliott Nugent
- Distributed by: 20th Century Fox
- Release date: January 8, 1943
- Running time: 70 minutes
- Country: United States
- Language: English

We Are the Marines is a 1942 full-length documentary film produced by The March of Time. It was produced and directed by Louis De Rochemont and distributed by 20th Century Fox.

== Plot ==
The early portions of the film deal with the history of the Corps, from Colonial times to the 1942. The film's midsection details the arduous training procedure of the Few and the Proud at Parris Island and elsewhere. Finally, wartime newsreel footage is adroitly blended with dramatized re-enactments to illustrate the contributions, and the necessity, of the Marines in World War II.
