= Upbeat in Music =

- Lobby card featuring Glenn Miller
- Starring: Marian Anderson; Tex Beneke; Benny Goodman and His Orchestra; Perry Como; Tommy Dorsey; Duke Ellington; Glenn Miller; The Pied Pipers; Frank Sinatra; Paul Whiteman
- Distributed by: 20th Century Fox
- Release date: November 30, 1943
- Running time: 17 minutes
- Country: United States
- Language: English

Upbeat in Music is a 1943 short film produced as part of The March of Time series distributed theatrically by 20th Century Fox. The film has significant history as being early film appearances of Frank Sinatra and Perry Como. The film also features footage of Glenn Miller in uniform as a captain in the United States Army Air Forces leading the U.S. Army Training Command Band.

== The March of Time series ==
Episodes in the series were issued every four weeks. The documentary was produced by the editors of Time. Upbeat in Music was Issue No. 5, Volume 10 in the series. 20th Century Fox released lobby cards to promote the documentary.

20th Century Fox described the Upbeat in Music episode from 1943 as follows: "'Upbeat in Music'. Music for victory ... symphony or jazz. Elman or Ellington, Koussevitzky, Como, Gershwin, Goodman, Glenn Miller, Bea Wain and many others ... your favorite artists are seen giving their talents to build morale in a star-studded story of music at war."

HBO Archives presented a synopsis of the documentary: "Upbeat in Music – (Volume 10, Episode 5) – December 1943 SYNOPSIS: Music for military, brief Glenn Miller in uniform, V-discs, 'Hip Kits', many big names playing, singing, composing. Runs 16:53."

== Sources ==
- Yanow, Scott. Jazz on Film. 2004. "There is a very brief glimpse of Glenn Miller's Army Air Force Band ('St. Louis Blues March')." https://books.google.com/books?id=8FwyY-6IveQC&pg=PA240...
