= Justice (1954 TV series) =

American drama television series (1954–1956)

- Genre: Legal drama
- Starring: Dane Clark; Gary Merrill; William Prince
- Narrated by: Westbrook Van Voorhis
- Country of origin: United States
- Original language: English
- No. of seasons: 3
- No. of episodes: 89

Production
- Running time: 30 minutes
- Production company: Talent Associates

Original release
- Network: NBC
- Release: April 8, 1954 – March 25, 1956

Justice is an American drama television series about lawyers with The Legal Aid Society of New York City that aired on NBC from April 8, 1954, to March 25, 1956. The series stars Gary Merrill and Dane Clark; Clark was subsequently replaced by William Prince. It is narrated by Westbrook Van Voorhis.

== Overview ==
Broadcast live, the series presented stories of poor people who needed legal help, primarily in criminal cases but sometimes in civil cases.

Clark portrayed Richard Adams in 1954–1955, and Prince took over the role in 1955–1956. Merrill played Jason Tyler in 1954–1955. Guest stars included Gisele MacKenzie, Betty Field, and Carmen Matthews.

Sponsored by the American Tobacco Company, the program initially was broadcast on Thursdays from 8:30 to 9 p.m. Eastern Time. In October 1955 it was moved to Sundays from 10:30 to 11 p.m. E.T.
