= Roy E. Larsen =

American publisher (1899–1979)

Roy Edward Larsen (April 20, 1899 – September 9, 1979) was an American publishing executive who worked for Time Inc. for 56 years. Following founders Henry Luce and Briton Hadden, Larsen was credited with being responsible for the company's growth and success. At the time of his death he was described as being "one of the most influential figures in the golden age of the company's empire."

== Early life ==
Larsen was born in Boston, Massachusetts, the son of Robert Larsen and Stella Belyea Larsen. He attended Boston Latin School, graduating in 1917, and entered Harvard College, graduating in 1921. While in college he served as treasurer and business manager of The Harvard Advocate, where he brought the newspaper back to profitability by increasing circulation.

== Career ==
Larsen directed sales from the inception of Time magazine, and he is credited with recruiting the first 12,000 subscribers via a direct mail campaign in 1923. He continued to increase sales and circulation over the next 30 years. When Hadden died in 1929, Larsen was appointed as Time's business manager by Luce. In 1939 Larsen succeeded Luce as president of Time, serving in this position to 1960 and then as vice chairman until his retirement in April 1979.

Larsen helped to organize and develop The March of Time, an Academy Award winning radio and news film series which was produced from 1935 to 1951. He also served as publisher of Life magazine from 1936 to 1946. A fitness buff, Larsen developed an idea for a sports magazine in 1954, which later turned into Sports Illustrated.

A conservationist, Larsen organized the Nantucket Conservation Fund in 1965, and was elected to the board of the Nature Conservancy in 1973. As a tribute to Larsen, Time Inc. gave the conservancy a 2,000-acre tract in East Texas now known as the Roy E. Larsen Sandyland Sanctuary.

Larsen died in 1979, and the following year was inducted into the Advertising Hall of Fame.

== Personal life ==
Larsen married Margaret Zerbe in 1927. They had four children; a daughter, Anne (Simonson) and three sons: Robert, Christopher and Jonathan, the latter becoming editor-in-chief of The Village Voice.
