= The March of Time (radio program) =

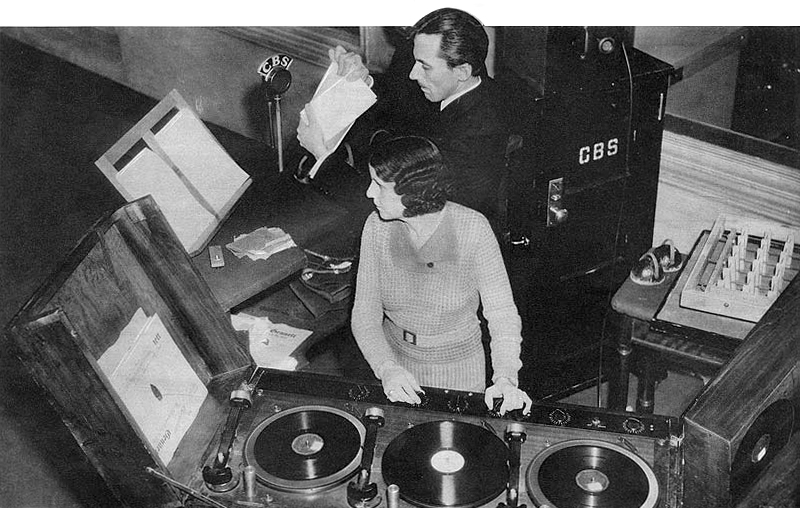
- CBS sound effects chief Ora Daigle Nichols and George O'Donnell on The March of Time
- Genre: News documentary and dramatization
- Running time: 30 minutes (1931–35); 15 minutes (1935–36); 30 minutes (1936–45)
- Country of origin: United States
- Language: English
- Syndicates: CBS (1931–37); Blue (1937–42); NBC (1942–44); ABC (1944–45)
- Created by: Roy E. Larsen; Fred Smith
- Directed by: Arthur Pryor Jr. Donald Stouffer; Thomas Harrington; William Spier; Homer Fickett
- Produced by: Arthur Pryor Jr. Donald Stouffer; Thomas Harrington
- Executive producer: Davidson Taylor (for CBS)
- Narrated by: Ted Husing; Westbrook Van Voorhis; Harry von Zell; Henry Gladstone
- Original release: March 6, 1931 – July 26, 1945
- Sponsored by: Time Inc.

The March of Time is an American radio news documentary and dramatization series sponsored by Time Inc. and broadcast from 1931 to 1945. Created by broadcasting pioneer Fred Smith and Time magazine executive Roy E. Larsen, the program combined actual news events with reenactments. The "voice" of The March of Time was Westbrook Van Voorhis. The radio series was the basis of the famed March of Time newsreel series shown in movie theaters from 1935 to 1951.

== Origins ==
The March of Time had its origins in a 1928 radio series developed at WLW in Cincinnati, Ohio, by radio pioneer Fred Smith, who obtained permission to use material from Time magazine in his broadcasts. Later, Smith and Roy E. Larsen, the first circulation manager for Time, developed Time magazine's own radio program, which they called Newscasting. That program evolved into The March of Time, the first network presentation of a dramatized "news" format. At Smith's suggestion, the program included the "10 best radio actors", an "announcer extraordinary", a "splendid orchestra" and a "clever director."

== Production and writing ==
"The March of Time was the first radio newsreel", wrote radio historian John Dunning, "dramatized news events, elaborately staged with sound effects and music, put together like a newspaper—often on deadline, with impact and accuracy its twin goals."

The March of Time began airing as a weekly series March 6, 1931, on CBS Radio on over 32 stations on Friday evenings. The half-hour program aired Fridays at 8:30 p.m. ET. In 1935 the program was trimmed to 15 minutes and aired five times a week, but after a year returned to its 30-minute weekly format. Suspended in 1939, the series was revived in 1941 with a new format, and lasted until 1945.

Time Inc. was the only sponsor of all of the shows; other sponsors included Remington Rand, the Wrigley Company, and Electrolux. The March of Time aired on CBS through October 7, 1937, and was subsequently broadcast on the Blue Network (October 14, 1937 – June 5, 1942), NBC (July 9, 1942 – October 26, 1944), and ABC (November 2, 1944 – July 26, 1945).

The March of Time broadcasts began with the tramp-tramp-tramp of shuffling feet, to indicate "the relentless impersonal progress of events." The principal narrator was the Voice of Time; another was the Voice of Fate, narrating stories of catastrophe or the death of a notable person. The first Voice of Time was Ted Husing; Westbrook Van Voorhis was the Voice of Fate. In fall 1931 Harry von Zell began a brief tenure as Time, but in October 1933 he moved to the role of announcer and Van Voorhis assumed the leading role. His voice—concluding most broadcasts with a booming, "Time … marches on!"—became synonymous with the program, both on radio and in the newsreel series.

Written to match the style of Time magazine, radio scripts incorporated transcripts of statements and comments by the figures impersonated on The March of Time whenever possible. When these could not be obtained, writers were allowed to "re-create" appropriate dialogue. Actors researched and rehearsed with great care to mimic the precise voice patterns and characteristics of the people they were impersonating. March of Time creator Roy E. Larsen recalled that only one person, Franklin D. Roosevelt, ever complained about their treatment on the program. The President was annoyed because he was getting calls from political advisors regarding statements spoken on The March of Time that he had not uttered, even though they matched his policies. White House complaints continued until 1937, when The March of Time stopped imitating FDR altogether.

"From the beginning it was known that The March of Time would face the stiffest production challenges that radio had yet known", wrote John Dunning:

When a big story broke at the last minute, a polished ready-to-air show was reorganized: the entire menu was shifted as events demanded. Newspapers are accustomed to this … but in radio, a new breed of actor had come to the fore, players who could deliver superb performances from scripts they had never seen before going live on the air. Sight reading, they called it: reading always two lines ahead and acting the lines they had already read. Actors, sound artists, and musicians worked feverishly to accommodate the bulletins from Time's reporters in the field.

== Format ==
Seven or eight sketches were featured in each show, varying in length from 90 seconds to four minutes. Newspapers were sometimes scooped by the radio docudrama. On May 6, 1937, the Hindenburg disaster took place two hours before air time, and The March of Time created a segment that focused on the history of airship travel and ended with the news of the disaster in Lakehurst, New Jersey. Herbert Morrison's recorded radio eyewitness report from the landing field was not broadcast until the next day.

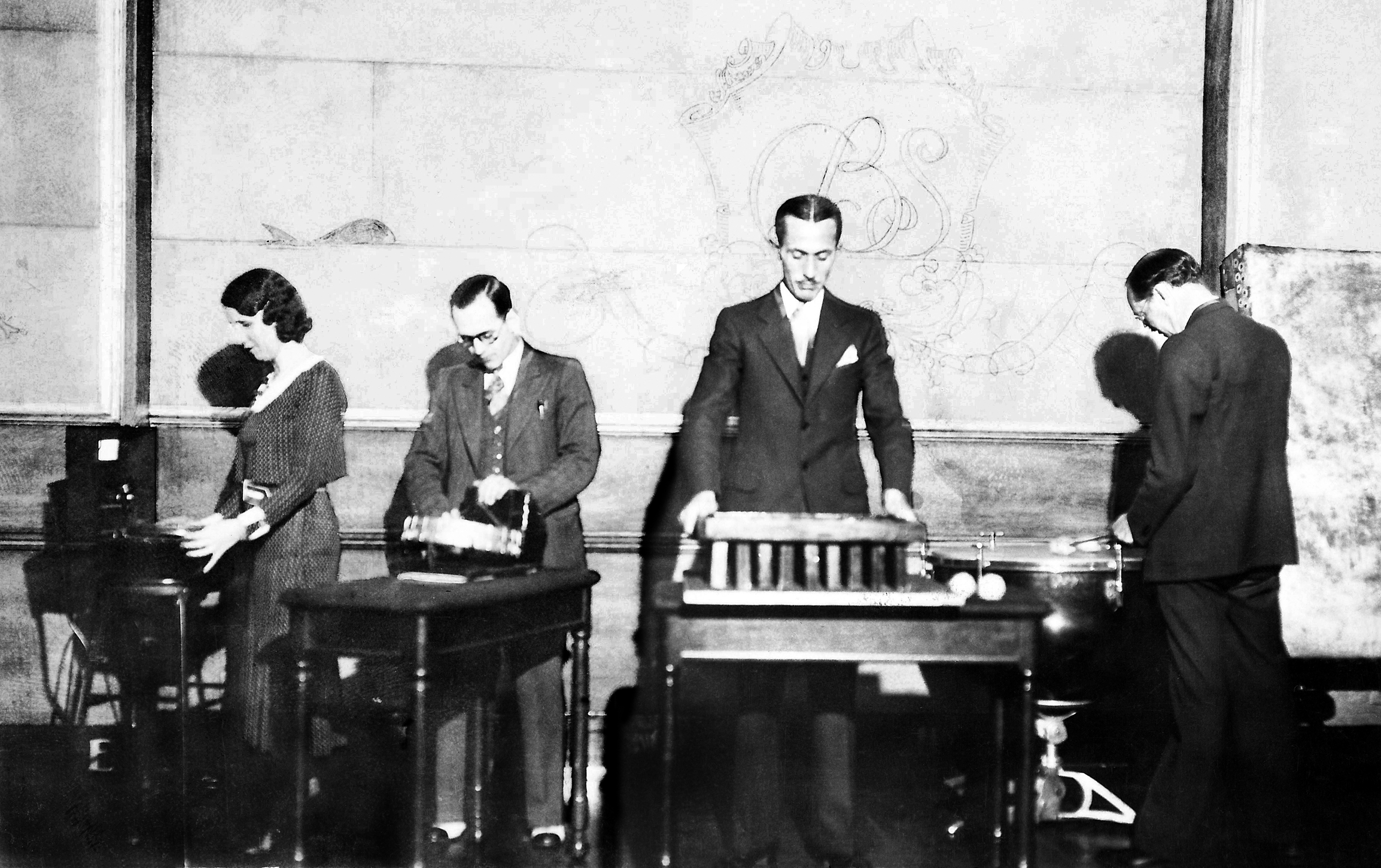
Sound effects specialists Ora D. Nichols, Henry Gauthiere, George O'Donnell, and Arthur Nichols on The March of Time

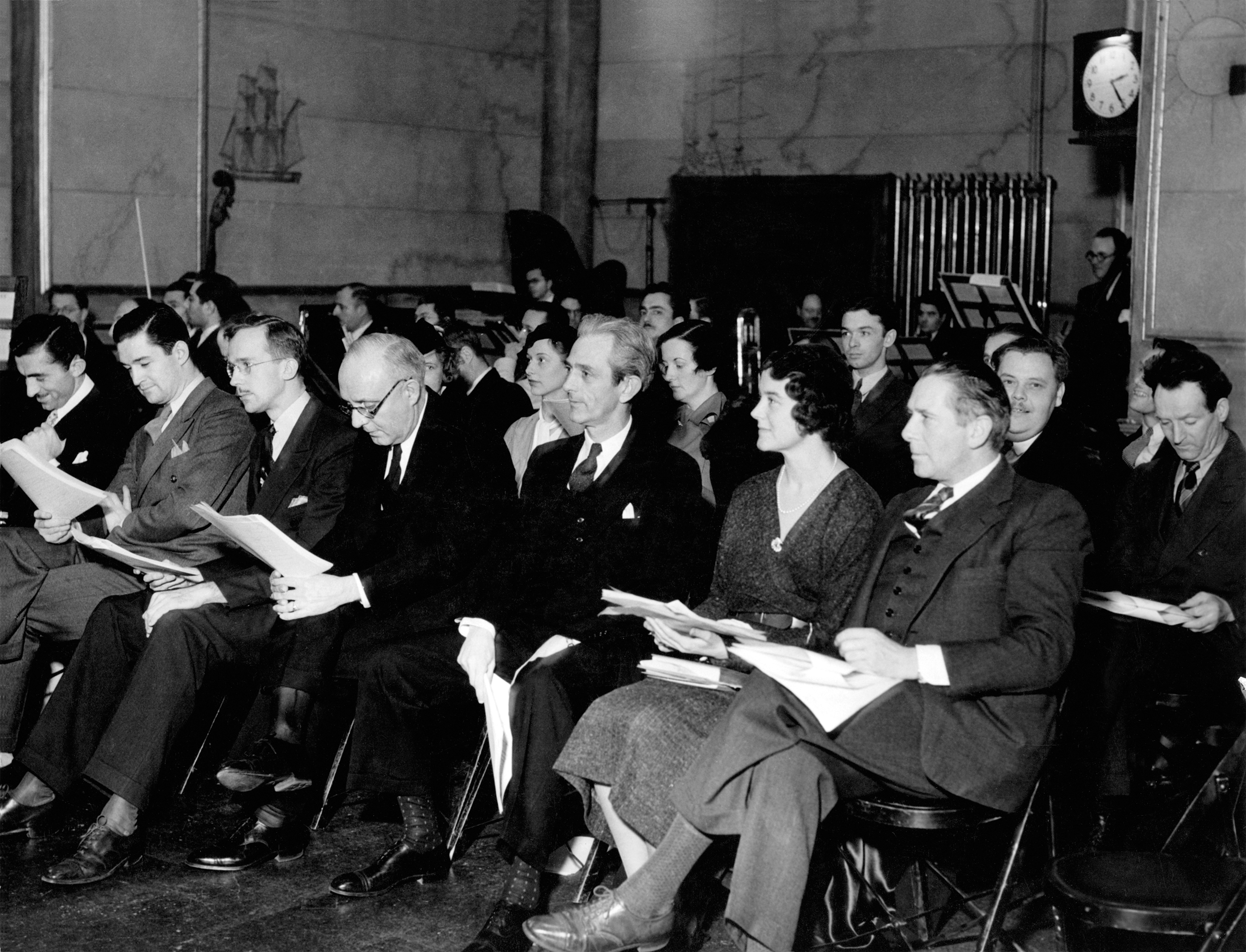
Rehearsal for The March of Time with cast including Ted de Corsia, William Pringle, William Adams, Marion Hopkinson and Ray Collins

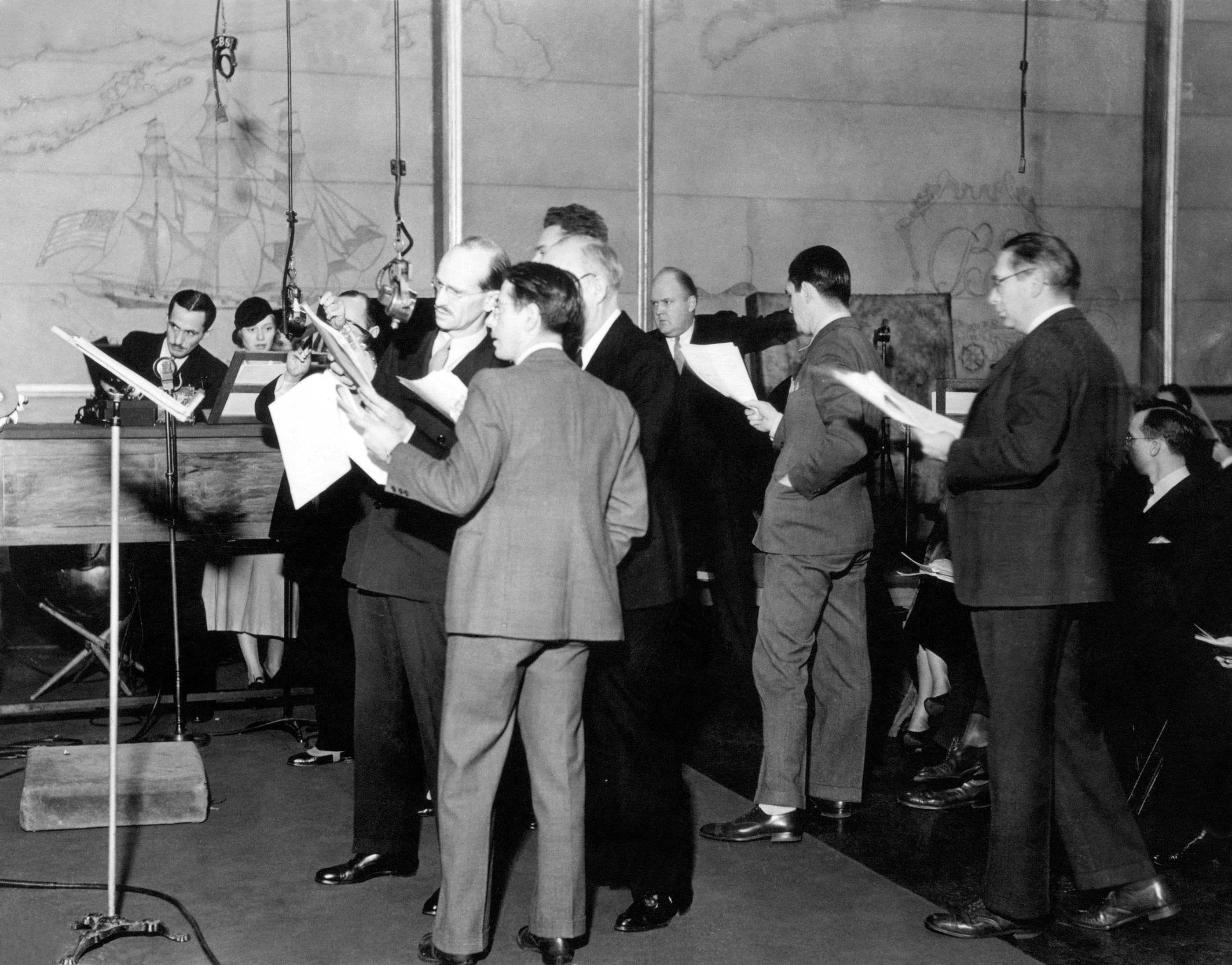
Actors presenting The March of Time

== Cast ==
Although its cast was uncredited, The March of Time capitalized on the Broadway celebrity of Orson Welles in a 1938 advertisement. Months later Welles employed the series's techniques in his radio version of The War of the Worlds (1938), and he parodied the newsreel series in his first feature film, Citizen Kane (1941).

Name	Notable roles	Notes
William Adams	Franklin D. Roosevelt	
Charme Allen		
Georgia Backus		
John Battle	John Nance Garner; Huey Long	
Harry Browne		
Art Carney	Franklin D. Roosevelt	
Ray Collins		
Staats Cotsworth	Franklin D. Roosevelt	
Pedro de Cordoba		
Ted de Corsia	Herbert Hoover; Hugh S. Johnson; Pierre Laval; Huey Long; Benito Mussolini	
Kenny Delmar		
Peter Donald	Neville Chamberlain	
Arlene Francis		
Martin Gabel		
Porter Hall		
Juano Hernandez		
Marion Hopkinson	Frances Perkins; Eleanor Roosevelt	
Ted Husing	Narrator	
Leon Janney		
Edwin Jerome	Alfonso XIII of Spain; Haile Selassie; Joseph Stalin	
Ted Jewett		
Bill Johnstone	Edward VIII; Cordell Hull; Franklin D. Roosevelt	
Nancy Kelly	Eleanor Roosevelt	
Adelaide Klein		
Myron McCormick		
John McIntire		
Herschel Mayall		
Gary Merrill		
Agnes Moorehead	Eleanor Roosevelt	
Arnold Moss		
Claire Niesen		
Jeanette Nolan	Eleanor Roosevelt	
William Pringle	Charles Evans Hughes	
Frank Readick	Cordell Hull; Charles Lindbergh; Jimmy Walker; Giuseppe Zangara	
Elliott Reid		
Charles Slattery		
Everett Sloane		
Jack Smart	Huey Long	
Howard Smith		
Lotte Staviski		
Paul Stewart		
Karl Swenson		
Maurice Tarplin	Winston Churchill	
Fred Uttal		
Westbrook Van Voorhis	Narrator	
Harry von Zell	Narrator	
Dwight Weist	Fred Allen; George Arliss; Ethel Barrymore; John Barrymore; Lionel Barrymore; Charles Coughlin; Joseph Goebbels; Bruno Hauptmann; William Randolph Hearst; Adolf Hitler; Fiorello La Guardia; John L. Lewis; George Bernard Shaw	
Orson Welles	Dionne quintuplets Sigmund Freud; Horace Greeley; Charles Laughton; J. Hamilton Lewis; Fredric March; Paul Muni; Haile Selassie; Spencer Tracy; Victor Emmanuel III of Italy; Basil Zaharoff	
Nona West		

== Broadcast history ==
Unless noted, broadcast information for The March of Time is drawn from John Dunning's On the Air: The Encyclopedia of Old-Time Radio (1998).

- 1931–35: CBS, March 6, 1931 – April 26, 1935, 30 minutes. Fridays at 10:30 p.m. ET March 6, 1931 – June 1931; Fridays at 8 p.m. July 1931–33; Fridays at 8:30 p.m. 1933–34; Fridays at 9 p.m. 1934–35.
- 1935–36: CBS, August 26, 1935 – September 25, 1936, 15 minutes. Weeknights at 10:30 p.m. ET.
- 1936–37: CBS, October 15, 1936 – October 7, 1937, 30 minutes. Thursdays at 10:30 p.m. ET.
- 1937–39: Blue Network, October 14, 1937 – April 28, 1939, 30 minutes. Thursdays at 8:30 p.m. ET October 14, 1938 – January 1938; Thursdays at 8 p.m. January–July 1938; Fridays at 9:30 p.m. July 8, 1938– April 28, 1939.
- 1941–42: Blue Network, October 9, 1941 – June 5, 1942, 30 minutes. Thursdays at 8 p.m. ET October 9, 1941 – February 1942; subsequently Fridays at 9:30 p.m. or 9 p.m.
- 1942–44: NBC, July 9, 1942 – October 26, 1944, 30 minutes. Thursdays at 10:30 p.m. ET.
- 1944–45: ABC, November 2, 1944 – July 26, 1945, 30 minutes. Thursdays at 10:30 p.m. ET.

== Reviews and commentary ==
- Orson Welles, This is Orson Welles — It was a marvelous show to do. Great fun, because, half an hour after something happened, we'd be acting it out with music and sound effects and actors. It was a super show — terribly entertaining. ... I began as an occasional performer, because they had a regular stock company, and then I was finally let in—one of the inner circle. And then I had the greatest thrill of my life—I don't know why it thrilled me (it does still, to think of it now), I guess because I thought March of Time was such a great thing to be on. One day, they did as a news item on March of Time the opening of my production of the black Macbeth, and I played myself on it. And that to me was the apotheosis of my career—that I was on March of Time acting and as a news item. I've never felt since that I've had it made as much as I did that one afternoon.
- John Dunning, On the Air: The Encyclopedia of Old-Time Radio — And like any good newspaper, it was damned left and right. Real newsmen condemned it for hamming up the news. Communists called it fascistic. William Randolph Hearst labeled it Communistic propaganda and forbade mention of it in the pages of his newspapers. It was banned in Germany, It even ran afoul of Roosevelt, who asked and later demanded that it stop impersonating him, because the actors were so good they were diminishing the impact of his Fireside Chats. It was accused of being pompous, pretentious, melodramatic, and bombastic. But it was never dull. In the mid-1930s, Time had Hooper numbers in the 25 point range.

== Awards and recognition ==
The March of Time was inducted into the National Radio Hall of Fame in 1990.
