= Louis de Rochemont =

American film producer (1899–1978)

- Born: January 13, 1899; Chelsea, Massachusetts, U.S.
- Died: December 23, 1978 (aged 79); York, Maine, U.S.
- Occupation: Filmmaker
- Notable work: The March of Time
- Spouse: Virginia Shaler
- Children: 2
- Relatives: Richard de Rochemont (brother)

Louis Clark de Rochemont (January 13, 1899 – December 23, 1978) was an American filmmaker known for creating, along with Roy E. Larsen, the monthly theatrically shown newsreels The March of Time. His brother, Richard, was also a producer and writer on The March of Time.

== Biography ==
De Rochemont was born in 1899 in Chelsea, Massachusetts. The son of a Boston attorney, he grew up in small-town Massachusetts. The de Rochemonts were descended from Huguenot ancestors who settled in New Hampshire early in the nineteenth century.

De Rochemont's film career began when, still a teenager, he filmed his New England neighbors and sold the footage to local theatres under the title See Yourself as Others See You. The newsreels he later created—The March of Time—defined film news from 1935 to 1951. The 20-minute films, which combined filmed news with interpretive interviews and dramatizations, appeared between featured films in theaters.

As of February 1942, de Rochemont was employed by Time Inc. and was living with his wife, Virginia, in Newington, New Hampshire.

When he moved from newsreels to feature films, de Rochemont chose to produce films based on real stories in actual locations, often with locals in the cast. After three spy films that helped define film noir, including The House on 92nd Street (1945), he produced a wide array of feature films such as the semi-documentary Boomerang (1947). De Rochemont produced Lost Boundaries (1948), a film based on a true story about a black doctor who set up a practice in a New England town while "passing" for white, which starred William Greaves who later became a documentary filmmaker.

He has been called the "father of the docu-drama." The March of Time received an honorary Oscar at the 9th Academy Awards (1937) and was nominated several times in documentary categories. Windjammer (1958) was produced by de Rochemont and directed by his son, Louis de Rochemont III. The elder Rochemont also produced The Roman Spring of Mrs. Stone (1962).

In March 1951, de Rochemont's production company purchased the animated film rights to George Orwell's Animal Farm, and de Rochemont was heavily involved in the artistic direction of the animated film. De Rochemont's firm acted as a "front" for the Central Intelligence Agency, the actual funder/producer of this film.

De Rochemont died in 1978 in York, Maine.
