= Richard de Rochemont =

American filmmaker

- Born: December 13, 1903; Chelsea, Massachusetts, U.S.
- Died: August 2, 1982 (aged 78); Flemington, New Jersey, U.S.
- Education: Cambridge Latin School; Williams College; Harvard College
- Occupations: Filmmaker, producer
- Notable work: The March of Time
- Spouse: Jane Louise Meyerhoff
- Relatives: Louis de Rochemont (brother)

Richard de Rochemont (December 13, 1903 – August 2, 1982) was an American documentary filmmaker and producer in the mid-20th century.

== Biography ==
De Rochemont was born in Chelsea, Massachusetts, in 1903. He was educated at Cambridge Latin School and Williams College, then graduated from Harvard College in 1928. He and initially worked in newspapers, for the Boston Advertiser and The New York Sun. He started his film career as a foreign editor for Fox Movietone News (1930–1934).

Stationed in France until 1941, de Rochemont produced a series of shorts which covered subjects like World War II, the 1920s, and the Vatican. In 1943, de Rochemont became the president of France Forever and continued his action until after the Liberation, giving way to Doctor Albert Simard. From 1943 to 1951, de Rochemont was executive producer of The March of Time newsreel series, which was co-created by his brother, Louis de Rochemont.

De Rochemont produced Crusade in Europe (1949), the very first documentary series produced for television, based on the book by Dwight D. Eisenhower, produced by Time Inc., and distributed by Twentieth Century-Fox Television. He was producer for A Chance to Live (1949), which won an Oscar for Best Documentary Short at the 22nd Academy Awards (1950).

In 1952, de Rochemont produced various films on Abraham Lincoln. In 1955, he founded his own film production company, Vavin Incorporated. The company produced instructional films for organizations like Reader's Digest and the French Tourist Office between the 1950s and 1980s. De Rochemont retired from Vavin in 1980. He was also the author or co-author of three cookbooks.

De Rochemont died in 1982 in Flemington, New Jersey.
