= Westbrook Van Voorhis =

American actor (1903–1968)

Cornelius Westbrook Van Voorhis (September 21, 1903 – July 13, 1968) was a narrator for television programs and movies. He is perhaps best known for his work on The March of Time radio and newsreel series, where he became known as the "Voice of Doom", as well as for the catchphrase, "Time...marches on!"

== Early years ==
Van Voorhis was born in New Milford, Connecticut, on September 21, 1903, and studied at the United States Naval Academy.

== Career ==
Van Voorhis became a broadcaster late in the 1920s. On radio, he worked for station WOR and the CBS and NBC networks.

He narrated each episode of the 1954–1956 NBC series Justice. He also did narration for the 1957 television series Panic!. He was originally scheduled to be the announcer for The Twilight Zone television show but narrated only the television pilot. The episode, titled "Where is Everybody?," had its narration revoiced by the show's creator and writer, Rod Serling.

One of his last appearances was in a circa-1966 series of TV commercials for Quaker Life Cereal, where he moderated "the great Quaker Life debate....is it for adults or kids?" He ended each commercial with his stentorian voice proclaiming "Quaker Life. It must be for everybody!".

== Death ==
Van Voorhis died of cancer at New Milford Hospital in New Milford, Connecticut in 1968, aged 64. His interment was at New Milford's Center Cemetery.
