= The Devil and Miss Jones =

1941 film by Sam Wood

- Theatrical release poster
- Directed by: Sam Wood
- Written by: Norman Krasna
- Produced by: Frank Ross
- Starring: Jean Arthur; Robert Cummings; Charles Coburn; Edmund Gwenn; Spring Byington; S. Z. Sakall; William Demarest
- Cinematography: Harry Stradling
- Edited by: Sherman Todd
- Music by: Roy Webb
- Production company: Frank Ross–Norma Krasna
- Distributed by: RKO Radio Pictures
- Release dates: April 4, 1941 (Miami); April 11, 1941 (United States)
- Running time: 92 minutes
- Country: United States
- Language: English
- Budget: $664,000
- Box office: $1.4 million

The Devil and Miss Jones is a 1941 American romantic comedy film directed by Sam Wood and starring Jean Arthur, Robert Cummings, and Charles Coburn. Its plot follows a department store tycoon who goes undercover in one of his Manhattan shops to ferret union organizers, but instead becomes involved in the employees' personal lives.

With a screenplay by Norman Krasna, the film was the product of an independent collaboration between Krasna and producer Frank Ross (Jean Arthur's husband). Their short-lived production company released two films through RKO Radio Pictures (Miss Jones and the later A Lady Takes a Chance released in 1943). The film was well received by critics upon its release and garnered Academy Award nominations for Coburn and Krasna.

== Plot ==
Cantankerous tycoon John P. Merrick, the richest man in the world, learns he has been hanged in effigy by the employees of his department store who are trying to unionize. To identify the agitators, Merrick, whose photograph has not been in a newspaper in 20 years, goes undercover as a shoe clerk under the assumed name "Thomas Higgins". There, he befriends fellow clerk Mary Jones.

While undercover, Merrick grows increasingly sympathetic to his workers as he encounters unfair systemic treatment. First, he is undervalued and berated by his supervisor, Mr. Hooper, when told he has low scores on the intelligence test given new employees. Next Hooper underestimates his sales abilities, based on his age, assigning him to sell slippers. His encounter with a store shopper ends with her threatening to report him for chewing gum. Merrick begins to keep a "Doomsday Book" of retribution. When Merrick says he will work through lunch, Mary believes he cannot afford to eat and gives him money for lunch; she then mistakenly believes he used his lunch money to buy a pair of slippers for his aching feet. Merrick begins to fall in love with sweet-natured clerk Elizabeth Ellis, who shares her lunch with him.

Joe O'Brien, a labor union organizer, chains himself to steam pipes, urging employees to attend a union meeting that evening. At the union meeting with Mary, Merrick discovers Joe is Mary's boyfriend and sees Elizabeth there. Merrick is mortified when Mary uses "Thomas Higgins" as an example of a 55-year-old employee, laid off after a combined 25 years to be replaced by younger, cheaper labor, now struggling to find employment.

Determined to prove his salesmanship, Merrick instructs his butler to come to the store, bringing a child, to buy five pairs of a difficult-to-sell, outdated child's shoe that would earn him a bonus. When Hooper cheats Merrick out of the sale and bonus, Merrick instructs the butler to return the purchases. Merrick makes a $10 bet with Hooper that the shoes will be returned. His antagonism toward Hooper grows on learning Hooper is a rival for Elizabeth's affections. Elizabeth reassures Merrick that "the executive type" repels her, adding that she would never marry a rich man.

During a trip to the Coney Island beach with his co-workers, Merrick is separated from the group in a bathing suit, without money. He is arrested for theft when he tries to sell his expensive watch to a vendor. Joe helps Merrick at the police station by reciting the Bill of Rights and the Declaration of Independence. Back at the beach, Merrick and Elizabeth nap. Believing the others to be fully asleep, Joe and Mary discuss the union attempts, a list of 400 employees willing to strike, and the future of their relationship while Merrick furtively listens. After Joe leaves, Merrick pockets the list Joe dropped of pro-union employees.

Traveling home via subway, Merrick drops a card identifying "Thomas Higgens" as a confidential employee, accountable only to the Personnel Manager. Mary deduces that Merrick is a spy, later informing Joe. At the store, Joe and Mary try unsuccessfully to recover the list of pro-union employees by knocking Merrick unconscious, ending up in the general manager's office. Disgusted with the treatment of employees, Merrick berates the general manager, still unaware of Merrick's identity. The general manager feigns willingness, claiming to need proof enough employees support the union; Mary asks Merrick to give him the list of 400 pro-union employees, which Merrick hands over. When the manager admits deceit, Merrick and Mary take back the list and destroy it by eating it. Mary then uses the intercom system to successfully incite the entire store to strike.

In the following days, all employees picket Merrick's home. Mary, Elizabeth, and Joe―along with "Thomas Higgins"―go as union representatives to Merrick’s home to discuss terms. They are initially unaware of Merrick's identity, but upon discovery, Joe faints, Mary screams, and Elizabeth stares up at Merrick in disbelief as Merrick asks her if she would be willing to marry a rich man after all. Some time later, Joe and Mary, and Merrick and Elizabeth, are wed, and Merrick takes all the store employees on a cruise to Honolulu.

== Cast ==
- Jean Arthur as Mary Jones
- Robert Cummings as Joe O'Brien
- Charles Coburn as John P. Merrick
- Edmund Gwenn as Hooper, section manager
- Spring Byington as Elizabeth Ellis, clerk
- S. Z. Sakall as George, Merrick's butler
- William Demarest as First detective
- Walter Kingsford as Mr. Allison, store manager
- Montagu Love as Harrison
- Richard Carle as Oliver
- Charles Waldron as Needles
- Edwin Maxwell as Withers
- Edward McNamara as police sergeant
- Robert Emmett Keane as Tom Higgins
- Florence Bates as customer
- Matt McHugh as Sam
- Regis Toomey as 1st policeman
- Pat Flaherty as Mark, policeman with pickpocket
- Minta Durfee as customer (uncredited)
- William Elmer as attendant at Jim's bathhouse (uncredited)
- Frank Mills as attendant at third bathhouse (uncredited)
- Victor Potel as attendant at first bathhouse (uncredited)
- Walter Tetley as stock boy (uncredited)

== Production ==
Frank Ross and Norman Krasna decided to produce a movie together starring Jean Arthur (Ross's wife) based on a story by Krasna. The three formed a partnership and borrowed $600,000 from a bank to finance the film. In May it was announced that Krasna, Arthur and Ross would work without salary in change for profits and the film would be distributed through RKO. It was Arthur's first film at RKO since The Ex-Mrs. Bradford. By July Charles Coburn was attached.

The script was written in ten weeks. Krasna said "there was a tremendous social statement in" the film. "King Vidor in The Crowd [1928] would do it to the employee; I do it to the richest man in the world, so you'll smile at him. 'Are you chewing gum?' 'No, I’m not.' 'Open your mouth.' He swallows his gum."

In August 1940 it was announced Sam Wood would direct.

=== Filming ===
Filming started December 16, 1940. It finished February 1941. Krasna said " Sam Wood was a fabulous technician who knew nothing about the word, so that script stayed the same" throughout the shoot.

Filming started without a leading man cast. In January it was announced Robert Cummings would be borrowed from Universal. Filming had to stop for nine days so that Robert Cummings could shoot extra scenes at MGM in Free and Easy in late January.

The film needed three days of retakes, which included adding a role for Montagu Love.

Krasna claimed he heard Wood saw the film "and was horrified because he was an extreme rightist. I do it at such an angle—not to fool people—but because I believe it’s the best way to do something of social significance."

Krasna described the experience of making the film as one of the best in his career.

== Release ==
The Devil and Miss Jones had an early screening in New Orleans on April 2, 1941, followed by a premiere in Miami on April 4, 1941.

In order to promote the film, Arthur agreed to appear in a "cheesecake" still for the movie, which she was traditionally opposed to doing.

== Reception ==
=== Critical ===
Variety wrote "At times, script tends to over dialog passages that tend to slow down the otherwise neatly-paced temp but this is minor shortcoming in the overall content of the picture."

Filmink called it "an utterly brilliant social comedy... a rare pro-union movie from Hollywood."

Krasna called it "the best picture I ever wrote, in my opinion. I worked in Macy’s when I was going to law school, and I know what working in a department store was like. The Los Angeles Times, which was an arch-conservative newspaper at that time, knew enough to write an editorial against the picture. But the guy who came from some labor magazine... got up at the press preview in the studio and said, “You copped out.” He should have turned toward the audience and said, “That’s what it’s like, exploiting the lower classes.” I looked at this amateur. He hadn’t the vaguest idea of how propaganda works and what social statement I wanted to make. The editorial writer for The Los Angeles Times knew this was a dangerous picture."

=== Box office ===
According to RKO accounts, the film grossed $1,421,000 in the United States, making a profit of $117,000. However Jean Arthur's biographer wrote this was a disappointment to Ross, who was "absolutely devastated" by the result, according to Ross' son.

Ross and Krasna later collaborated on Krasna's play The Man with Blond Hair. They announced they would make another film, Googer Plays the Field but it appears to have not been made.

=== Accolades ===
- Nominated for Best Supporting Actor – Charles Coburn
- Nominated for Best Original Screenplay – Norman Krasna

== Adaptations to other media ==
On November 14, 1941, Philip Morris Playhouse presented a version of The Devil and Miss Jones on CBS radio. The adaptation starred Lana Turner. The story was also adapted as a radio play on two broadcasts of Lux Radio Theatre, first on January 19, 1942, with Turner and Lionel Barrymore, then on March 12, 1945, with Linda Darnell and Frank Morgan. It was also adapted twice on The Screen Guild Theater, first on June 7, 1943, with Laraine Day, Charles Coburn and George Murphy, again on August 12, 1946, with Van Johnson and Donna Reed. It was also adapted on the October 23, 1946, broadcast of Academy Award Theater, starring Charles Coburn and Virginia Mayo.

In 1950 Ross announced he wanted to make the film as a musical for his then wife Joan Caulfield. However, it was never made.

== Sources ==
- McGilligan, Patrick (1986). "Norman Krasna: The Woolworths Touch". Backstory: Interviews with Screenwriters of Hollywood's Golden Age. pp. 212–235.
- Jewell, Richard (1994). "RKO Film Grosses, 1929–51". Historical Journal of Film, Radio and Television. Vol. 14. pp. 51–58. ISSN 0143-9685.
