= Ivah Wills Coburn =

American actress (1878–1937)

Iva Wills Coburn
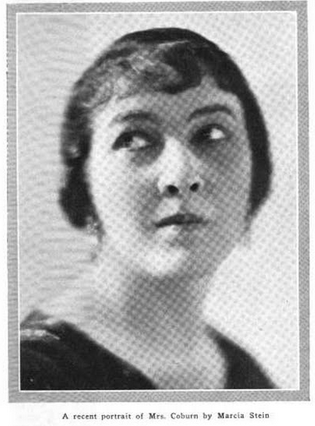
- Coburn in 1920
- Born: Ivah Myrtel Wills; August 19, 1878; Appleton City, Missouri, U.S.
- Died: April 27, 1937 (aged 58); New York City, U.S.
- Education: Chicago Musical College
- Occupation: Actress
- Spouse: Charles Coburn

Ivah Myrtle Coburn (née Wills; August 19, 1878 – April 27, 1937) was an American actress and Broadway producer.

== Early life and education ==
Coburn was born on August 19, 1878, in Appleton City, Missouri, to George Browning Wills and Anna Kunz Wills. She was raised in Brookston, Indiana. She studied drama at the Chicago Musical College.

== Career ==
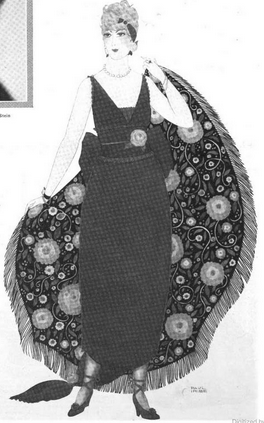
A costume designed for Coburn by Paul Iribe, for her role in Paris Leave (1920).

Coburn began her acting career in touring companies run by E. H. Sothern and Amelia Bingham. Ivah Wills Coburn's Broadway performing and producing credits included The Yellow Jacket (1916), The Imaginary Invalid (1917), The Better 'Ole (1918–1919), Three Showers (1920), French Leave (1920), The Bronx Express (1922), The Farmer's Wife (1924–1925), The Right Age to Marry (1926), The Yellow Jacket (1928–1929), Falstaff (1928–1929), The Plutocrat (1930), and Troilus and Cressida (1932).

Coburn and her husband had a touring repertory company that presented Shakespeare, French and Greek dramas and comedies at college campuses throughout the United States. They directed the Mohawk Drama Festival in Schenectady, New York in 1935 and 1936.

== Personal life ==
Ivah Wills met Charles Coburn when he was playing Orlando to her Rosalind in As You Like It. They married in 1906, in Baltimore. She died in 1937, at Lenox Hill Hospital, from "intestinal influenza". Among the honorary pallbearers at her funeral were George M. Cohan, Theodore E. Steinway, Walter Hampden, Dixon Ryan Fox, Augustin Duncan, and Edgar Lee Masters. After her death, Charles Coburn left the stage and found success in films, winning the Academy Award for Best Supporting Actor in 1944 for The More the Merrier.
