= Chicago Musical College =

Division of Chicago College of Performing Arts at Roosevelt University

- Chicago Musical College Building; Zeigfeld Hall
- Former name: Chicago Academy of Music
- Type: Conservatory
- Established: 1867
- Founder: Dr. Florenz Ziegfeld Sr.
- Parent institution: Roosevelt University
- Location: Chicago, Illinois; 41°52′35″N 87°37′28.3″W

Chicago Musical College is a division of the Chicago College of Performing Arts at Roosevelt University in Chicago, Illinois, United States.

== History ==
=== Founding ===
Dr. Florenz Ziegfeld Sr (1841–1923), founded the college in 1867 as the Chicago Academy of Music. The institution has endured without interruption for one hundred and fifty-nine years. Ziegfeld was the father of Florenz Jr., the Broadway impresario. The academy was credited as being the fourth conservatory in America. In 1871, the conservatory moved to a new building which was destroyed only a few weeks later by the Great Chicago Fire; despite the conflagration, the college was again up and running by the end of the year.

=== Name change ===
In 1872, the school changed its name to Chicago Musical College (CMC); over 900 students were enrolled in that year. A Normal Teachers' Institute was added to the school's offerings. Tuition in those was an average of one dollar per lesson. Four years later, the State of Illinois accredited the college as a degree-granting institution of higher learning. A Preparatory Division was opened which established branches throughout the city.

Rudolph Ganz joined CMC's faculty in 1900 and, except for a brief hiatus in the 1920s, remained associated with the school until his death in 1972. In 1917, CMC offered a Master of Music degree, and seven years later the school became a charter member of the National Association of Schools of Music.

In 1918, Nora Holt became the first African American woman to earn a Master of Music degree.

By 1925, the college moved into its own eleven-story building, Steinway Hall at 64 E. Van Buren Street. One hundred and twenty-five names appeared on the faculty roster for that year, and the school opened three dormitory floors for students. In 1936, CMC was admitted as a full member to the North Central Association of Colleges and Secondary Schools, the only independent music college in the Midwest to enjoy such status. By 1947, the college was offering doctorates in fine arts and music education.

=== Merger with Roosevelt University ===
In 1954, CMC merged with Roosevelt University's School of Music which had been founded in 1945. The name "Chicago Musical College" was retained for the new united college. All operations moved to join the university in the now–national landmark Auditorium Building at 430 South Michigan Avenue in Chicago's Loop. The building houses one of the finest auditoriums in the world, in addition to the Rudolph Ganz Memorial Recital Hall.

=== Reorganization as a conservatory ===
In the fall of 1997, Roosevelt established a College of Performing Arts, which joined Chicago Musical College and the Theater Program under one administrative unit, led by founding dean Donald Steven. In 2000, under the leadership of new dean James Gandre, the name was changed to Chicago College of Performing Arts. The college has two divisions: the Music Conservatory and the Theatre Conservatory.

== Notable students and faculty ==
=== Alumni ===
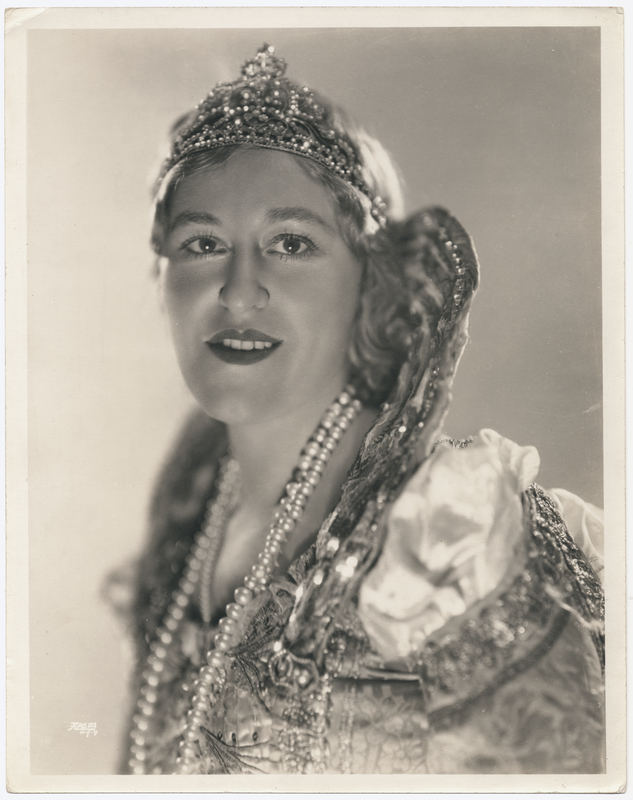
Grace Angelau, c. 1930

- Grace Angelau (1899–1958), opera singer
- Clarice Assad (born 1978), composer, pianist (Roosevelt University)
- Emmy Brady Rogers (1897–1985), composer, pianist, music critic
- Gena Branscombe (1881–1977), composer, pianist, choral conductor
- Storm Bull (1913–2007), composer, music educator
- Steve Coleman (born 1956), jazz saxophonist, composer
- Florence Cole Talbert (1890–1961), opera singer, music educator
- Theodore C. Diers (1880–1942), Wyoming state representative and senator
- Irene Dunne (1898–1990), film actress
- Walter Dyett (1901–1969), violinist, music educator
- Henry Eichheim (1870–1942), composer, conductor, violinist, organologist, and ethnomusicologist
- Vivian Fine (1913–2000), composer
- Floyd Graham (1902–1974), violinist, music-school educator
- Amy Allison Grant (born 1880), singer, lecturer, elocutionist
- Frances Wilson Grayson (1890–1927), pioneer woman aviator
- Vernice "Bunky" Green (born 1935), jazz saxophonist, jazz educator
- Johnny Hartman (1923–1983), singer
- Nora Holt, composer, singer, first African-American to obtain a master's degree in music
- Willis Laurence James (1900–1966), violinist
- Thaddeus Kozuch (1913–1991), BM 1936 MM 1951, concert pianist and composer
- Ida Krehm (m. Pick) (1912–1998), pianist, orchestral soloist and recitalist with various symphony orchestras in the Americas and Europe, and conductor

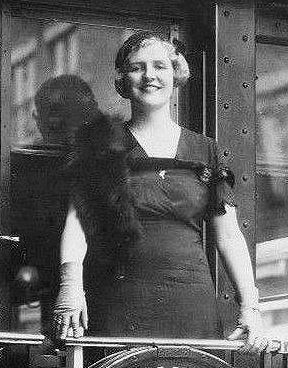
Harriet Lee, 1931

- Harriet Lee, radio singer (1920s–1930s) and Hollywood voice teacher
- Ramsey Lewis (1935–2022), jazz pianist, composer
- Lloyd Loar (1886–1943), mandolinist, violinist, violist, singer, composer, acoustics engineer, luthier
- Christine McIntyre (1911–1984), actress and soprano singer
- Robert McFerrin (1921–2006), operatic baritone
- Filip Mitrovic (born 1979), composer
- Ernestine Myers (1900–1991), dancer, dance educator
- Prudence Neff (1887–1949), pianist and music teacher
- Marie Pavey, actress

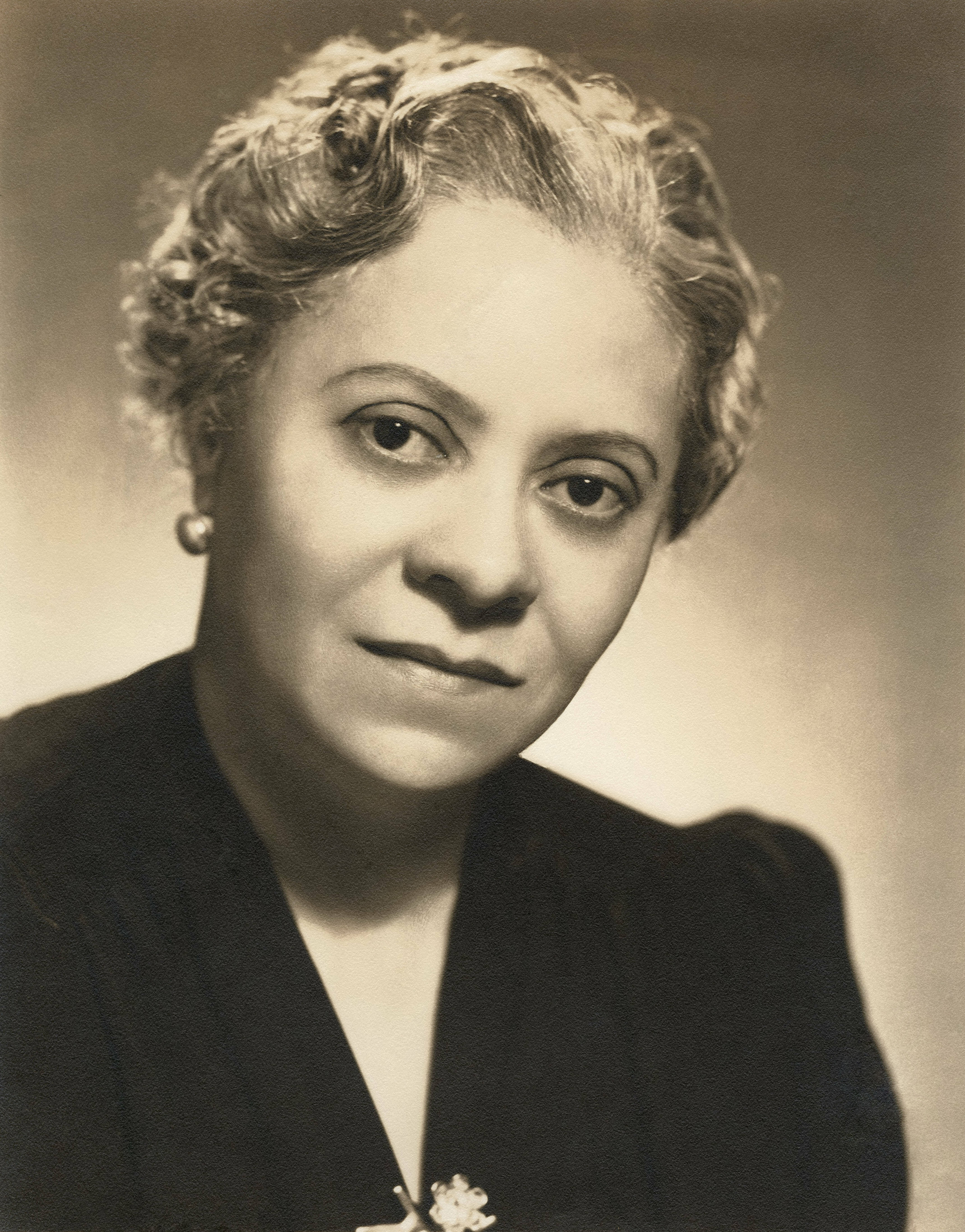
Florence Price, date unknown

- Florence Price (1887–1953), composer
- Julia Rebeil (1891–1973), pianist, professor at the University of Arizona
- William Revelli (1902–1994), wind-ensemble director, educator
- La Julia Rhea (1898–1992), opera singer
- Silvestre Revueltas (1899–1940), violinist and composer (attended 1918–1920, 1922–1924)
- Jim Schwall (born 1942), blues, blues-rock musician, singer-songwriter, Siegel-Schwall Band, Jim Schwall Band
- Corky Siegel (born 1943), blues, blues-rock musician, singer, composer, Siegel-Schwall Band
- Tracy Silverman, violinist, composer
- Frank Skinner (1897–1968), film composer and arranger
- Eddie South (1904–1962), jazz violinist
- Eileen Southern (1920–2002), musicologist
- Louise Cooper Spindle (1885–1968), composer

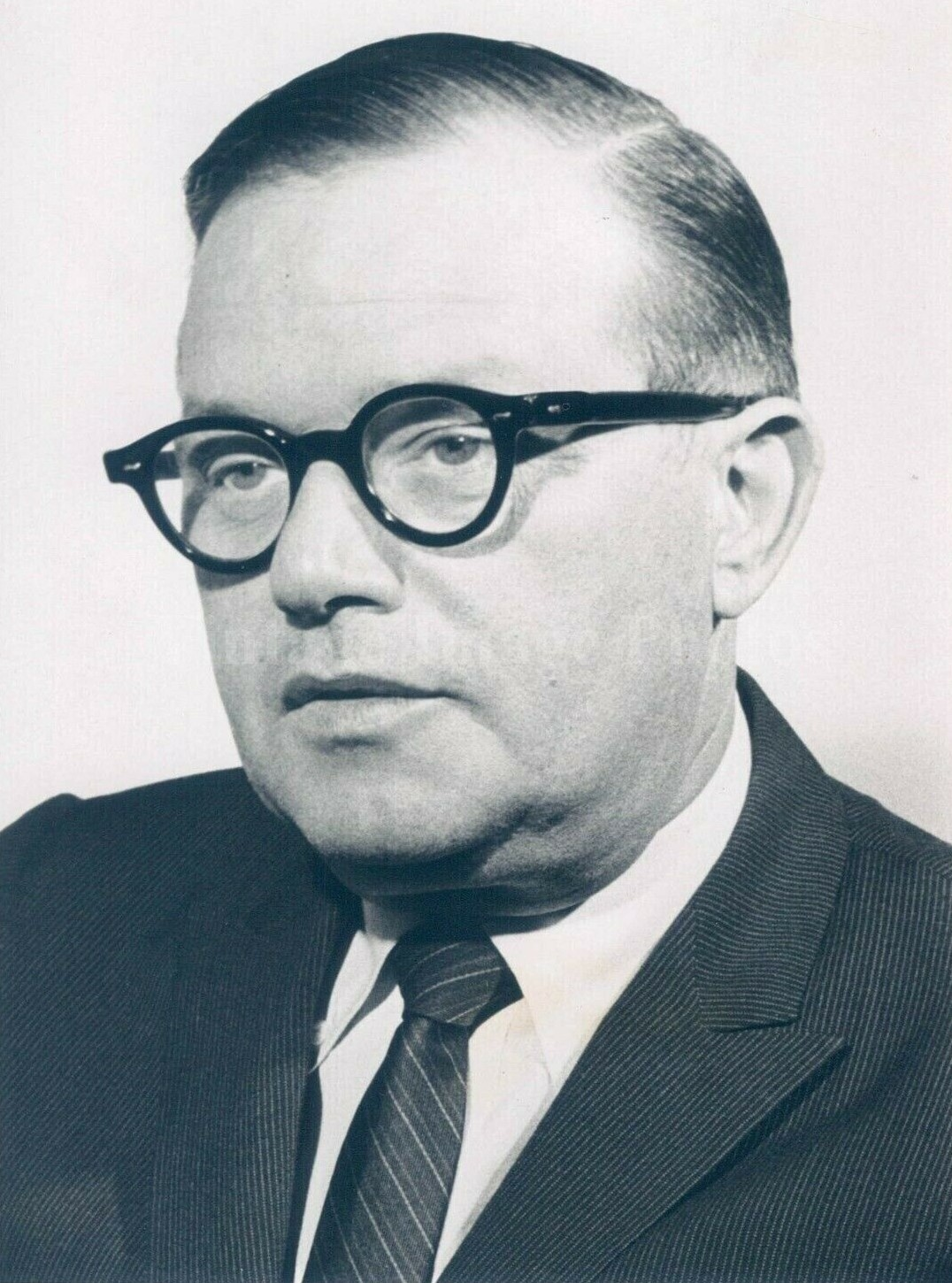
Jule Styne, 1961

- Jule Styne (1905–1994), songwriter
- Aube Tzerko (1909–1995), pianist and mentor, Bachelor's in 1927 from the Chicago Musical College under tutelage of Moisseye Boguslawski
- Jingjing Wang, pianist
- Walter Wenzel, violinist
- Allan Arthur Willman (1909–1989), MM 1930, classical pianist, composer, music-department chairman
- Ivah Wills Coburn (1878–1937), stage actress and producer

== Gallery of students ==
Clarice Assad

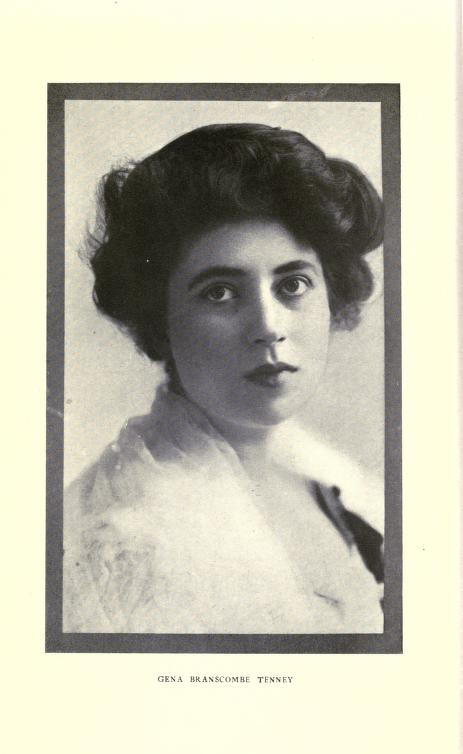
Gena Branscombe

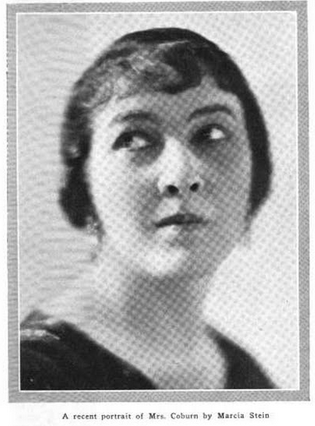
Ivah Wills Coburn

=== Faculty ===
- Petrowitsch Bissing (1871–1961)
- Rudolph Ganz (1877–1972), pianist, composer
- Goldie Golub (1909–2000), pianist, CMC piano educator for more than 50 years
- Percy Aldridge Grainger (1882–1961), pianist, composer
- Louis Gruenberg (1884–1964), composer
- Wesley LaViolette(1894–1978), influential early jazz educator
- Fannie B. Linderman (1875–1960), teacher of dramatic arts, entertainer, writer
- Herbert Witherspoon (1873–1935), music history
- Carl Valentin Wunderle (1866–1944), violinist

== Historic boards of directors and executive staff ==
1896 directors

- Augustus Eugene Bournique (1842–1926)
- William Melancton Hoyt (1837–1926)
- Alexander Hamilton Revell Sr. (1858–1931)
- The Reverend Hiram Washington Thomas, D.D. (1832–1909)
- Hon. Richard S. Tuthill (1841–1920)
- Carl O. Ziegfeld (1869–1921)
- Dr. Florenz Ziegfeld (1841–1923)
- William Kimball Ziegfeld (1872–1927)

1896 executive staff

- Alfred M. Snydacker (1858–1929), corporate secretary
- Carl O. Ziegfeld (1869–1921), business manager
- Dr. Florenz Ziegfeld (1841–1923), president
- William K. Ziegfeld (1872–1927), associate manager
