= Eichheim =

Eichheim may refer to:

- Henry Eichheim (1870–1942), American composer, conductor, violinist, organologist, and ethnomusicologist
- Josef Eichheim (1888–1945), German film actor
