= The Lady Says No =

1951 film by Frank Ross

- Film poster
- Directed by: Frank Ross
- Written by: Robert Russell
- Produced by: Frank Ross; John Stillman Jr.
- Starring: Joan Caulfield; David Niven; James Robertson Justice
- Cinematography: James Wong Howe
- Edited by: George Amy
- Music by: Arthur Lange; Emil Newman
- Production company: Ross-Stillman Productions
- Distributed by: United Artists
- Release date: December 25, 1951 (New York)
- Running time: 80 minutes
- Country: United States
- Language: English

The Lady Says No is a 1951 American comedy film directed by Frank Ross and starring Joan Caulfield, David Niven and James Robertson Justice.

== Plot ==
Bill Shelby is a globetrotting author and photographer on assignment for Life magazine to write a story about Dorinda Hatch, the author of the bestselling book The Lady Says No. Bill expects a dour spinster but Dorina is a young, attractive blonde. Her interactions with him cause her to question her beliefs, such as that it is unsuitable for a woman to fall in love with someone whom she also loathes. Bill and Dorinda clash over her theory that love is just an autonomic function and not worth the trouble. The thoughts and impulses invade her subconscious in a dream.

Dorinda's errant uncle appears, and Bill and Dorinda become involved in the lives of the colorful local characters. A barroom brawl ensues when Bill rebuffs Dorinda's attempts to seduce him and she charms all of the single men there. Goldie, the wife of a man named Potsie, confronts Dorinda in the powder room. Dorinda asks Goldie whether she would be happier without Potsie, and she agrees.

Dorinda later learns that Goldie has left Potsie, who now lives with Bill in Bill's trailer. Dorinda collects Goldie, who has closely read Dorinda's book, and they find the men. When the men refuse to emerge from the trailer, Dorinda steals Bill's car and drags the trailer onto a military base, leading to a high-speed police pursuit, but Potsie defiantly remains inside. A misunderstanding causes a general to be notified of a flying saucer report, and he comes to the trailer scene. He orders Potsie to exit to speak with Goldie, and they reconcile after Dorinda tells Goldie that her book is wrong and that she regrets writing it, as Potsie and Goldie love each other and belong together in spite of their fighting.

Dorinda packs her bags and vacates her aunt's home while her aunt and uncle reconcile. Bill discounts her book as merely an obsession with sexual repression. Dorinda throws Goldie's copy of her book into the ocean and resolves to write a book entitled 27 Ways to Say Yes.

David Niven and Joan Caulfield in the dream sequence

== Cast ==
- Joan Caulfield as Dorinda Hatch
- David Niven as Bill Shelby
- James Robertson Justice as Matthew Hatch
- Lenore Lonergan as Goldie
- Frances Bavier as Aunt Alice Hatch
- Peggy Maley as Midge
- Henry Jones as Potsy
- Jeff York as Goose
- George Davis as Warf Rat Bartender
- Robert Williams as General Schofield
- Mary Lawrence as Mary

== Production ==
The film was photographed by cinematographer James Wong Howe and features sequences filmed at Fort Ord, Pebble Beach and Carmel, California.

Director Frank Ross was married to Joan Caulfield, the film's female lead.

== Release ==
The film premiered on Christmas Day 1951 at Loew's Metropolitan Theatre in Brooklyn, New York as the second feature to Another Man's Poison.

To promote the film, Joan Caulfield embarked on a six-week personal-appearance tour that concluded in Detroit in early 1952.

== Reception ==
In a contemporary review for The New York Times, critic A. H. Weiler wrote: "After some unfunny gadding about to prove that the male animal is not a beast, Mr. Niven, who has maneuvered Miss Caulfield into seeing the light, makes this trenchant observation: 'This went out with silent pictures!' Yes, indeed!"

Critic Edwin Schallert of the Los Angeles Times wrote: "Joan Caulfield exhibits gifts as a pert comedienne in 'The Lady Says No,' and has David Niven as a capable teammate in the picture ... [W]ere all phases of the production as good as the cast, the results might have been in the bang-up class for a laugh film. 'The Lady Says No" has to huff and puff too much to avoid dalliance with the single idea that Miss Caulfield, in her role of Dorinda, has an antipathy toward men. You see, she has to live up to a book that she wrote warning women against the male sex, and she is ready to illustrate her ideas so positively that scenes are even highlighted with outright slapstick."

== See also ==
- Down with Love (2003 film)
