= Joan Caulfield =

American actress (1922–1991)

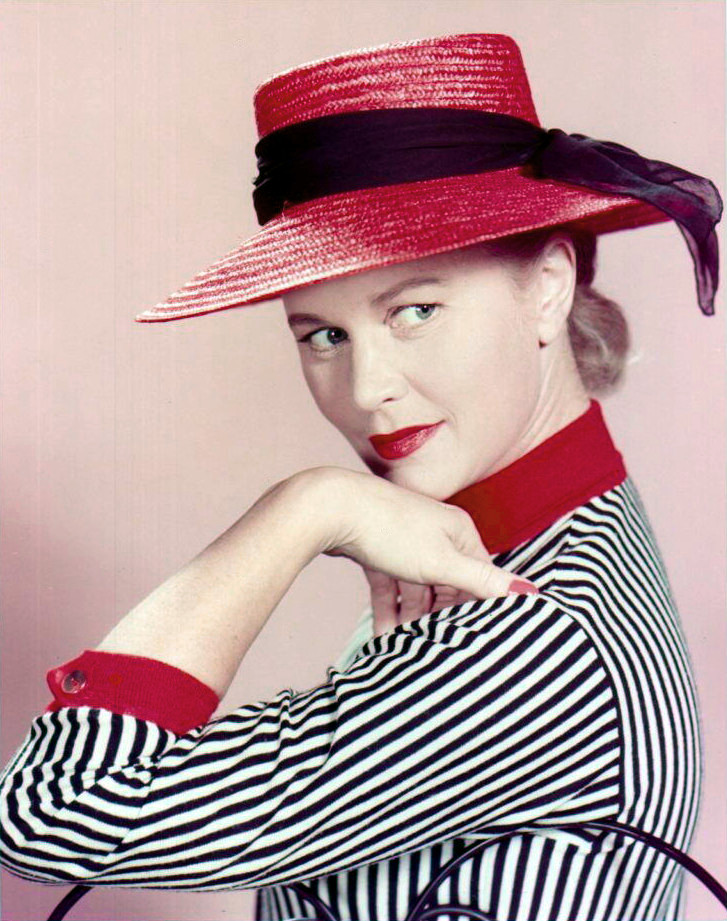
- Born: Beatrice Joan Caulfield; June 1, 1922; West Orange, New Jersey, U.S.
- Died: June 18, 1991 (aged 69); Los Angeles, California, U.S.
- Occupations: Actress, model
- Years active: 1941–1987
- Spouses: Frank Ross (m. 1950; div. 1960) Robert Peterson (m. 1960; div. 1966)
- Children: 2
- Relatives: Genevieve Caulfield (aunt)

Beatrice Joan Caulfield (June 1, 1922 – June 18, 1991) was an American actress and model. After being discovered by Broadway producers, she began a stage career in 1943 that eventually led to signing as an actress with Paramount Pictures.

== Early life and education ==
Beatrice Joan Caulfield was born on June 1, 1922, in West Orange, New Jersey. She attended Miss Beard's School in Orange, New Jersey. Caulfield was the niece of Genevieve Caulfield, who received the Presidential Medal of Freedom in 1963 for her work with blind children.

During her teenage years, the family moved to New York City, where she attended Columbia University. While at Columbia, Caulfield acted in many plays presented by the university's drama group. She also was a model with the Harry Conover Agency and "became a favorite with top-drawer fashion magazines", with her pictures appearing in many national magazines, including being on the cover of Life magazine's May 11, 1942 issue.

== Career ==
=== Stage ===
Caulfield appeared on Broadway in Beat the Band in 1942. It ran for 67 performances. She acted as Corliss Archer in the 1943 comedy Kiss and Tell. It was a huge success, running for 956 performances until 1945. After a year in the role, Caulfield left to pursue offers from Hollywood and she was replaced by her sister Betty Caulfield.

=== Film ===
In July 1944, Paramount put Caulfield in a lead role in her first film: Miss Susie Slagle's (1946). Made after but released earlier was Duffy's Tavern (1945), in which Caulfield had a cameo along with most of Paramount's talent roster.

Caulfield acted in Monsieur Beaucaire (1946), Blue Skies (1946), Dear Ruth (1947), Welcome Stranger (1947), and had a cameo in Variety Girl (1947). Caulfield acted in The Unsuspected (1947), The Sainted Sisters (1948), Larceny (1948) and Dear Wife (1948). Caulfield went to Columbia to make a musical with Robert Cummings, The Petty Girl (1950). She did a film for her husband's company, The Lady Says No (1951), releasing through United Artists.

=== Television ===
In the early 1950s, Caulfield guest starred on television shows such as Robert Montgomery Presents, Lux Video Theatre, The Ford Television Theatre, Schlitz Playhouse and Hollywood Opening Night. In 1953, she signed a contract with CBS. In the 1953 and 1954 seasons, she co-starred in the television version of My Favorite Husband. She had a supporting role in The Rains of Ranchipur (1955). In August 1955, she left her CBS contract to pursue feature work.

She starred in Celebrity Playhouse, Schlitz Playhouse again, Screen Directors Playhouse, and The Ford Television Theatre again. She was the subject of an episode of This Is Your Life in 1957. During the 1957–1958 season, Caulfield starred in Sally.

When the series ended, Caulfield guest-starred on shows like Pursuit, General Electric Theater, Hong Kong, Cheyenne, Burke's Law, The High Chaparral, and My Three Sons. She did stage shows like I Am a Camera and had the occasional role in a feature, such as Cattle King (1963), Red Tomahawk (1967) and Buckskin (1967).

=== Later years ===
In the 1960s and 1970s, Caulfield was active in touring companies of plays, summer stock theater and dinner theater across the country. She guest starred in a 1966 episode of My Three Sons. She starred in the pilot for The Magician (1973), The Daring Dobermans (1973), The Hatfields and the McCoys (1975), The Space-Watch Murders (1975), Pony Express Rider (1976), and episodes of Baretta and Murder, She Wrote.

== Personal life and death ==
In 1950, Caulfield married film producer Frank Ross, with whom she had a son, Caulfield Kevin Ross (born 1959). Ross produced and directed her 1951 film The Lady Says No, with David Niven taking second billing as her romantic interest. She separated from Ross, blaming the stress of working on Sally, then found out she was pregnant. Ross and Caulfield divorced in 1960.

In 1960, Caulfield married dentist Robert Peterson, with whom she had her second son, John Caulfield Peterson (born 1962). In 1966, they divorced.

Caulfield died from cancer at the age of 69 at Cedars-Sinai Medical Center in Los Angeles. A. C. Lyles delivered her eulogy. She was a practicing Roman Catholic.

She was a registered Republican who supported the campaign of Dwight Eisenhower in 1952 and for Barry Goldwater in 1964.

== Legacy ==
Caulfield has a star in the Hollywood Walk of Fame.

== Radio appearances ==
Year	Program	Episode/source
1946	Lux Radio Theatre	Miss Susie Slagle's
