= Genevieve Caulfield =

American blind teacher (1888–1972)

- Born: May 8, 1888; Suffolk, Virginia, U.S.
- Died: December 12, 1972 (aged 84); Bangkok, Thailand
- Occupation: Teacher

Genevieve Caulfield (May 8, 1888 – December 12, 1972) was an American teacher who started a school for blind people in Thailand.

== Biography ==
Born in Suffolk, Virginia, she lost her sight in an accident when a doctor put the wrong drops into her eyes when she was two months old. She went on to attend Overbrook School for the Blind and Columbia Teachers College.

Since her youth she had dreamed of becoming a teacher to help create a better understanding between Japanese and Americans. Her dream came true in 1923, when she went to Japan, where she taught English for a living as well as Braille to blind students.

In 1938 she opened the Bangkok School for the Blind, partly financed by her own savings, after she learned that blind children were considered useless in Thailand. Resisting repatriation during World War II, she stayed in Bangkok and continued to work for her school. From 1956 to 1960, she organized a school for the blind and a rehabilitation center for boys in Saigon. There is a statue in her honor at the school in Bangkok which still exists today.

Her autobiography The Kingdom Within was published in 1960. She died in 1972 in Bangkok.

== Recognition ==
In 1961, Caulfield was awarded the Ramon Magsaysay Award for International Understanding. On December 6, 1963, she received the Presidential Medal of Freedom from President John F. Kennedy in recognition of her work for the blind in Asia. The award was given by President Lyndon B. Johnson in honor of President John F. Kennedy.

Her niece was actress Joan Caulfield.
