= Stormbound =

1950 film

- Directed by: Luigi Capuano
- Written by: Domenico Meccoli; Fulvio Palmieri; Corrado Pavolini
- Story by: Luigi Capuano
- Produced by: William J. O'Sullivan; Aldo Raciti
- Starring: Constance Dowling; Andrea Checchi; Aldo Silvani
- Cinematography: Gábor Pogány
- Edited by: Robert M. Leeds
- Music by: Alessandro Cicognini
- Production company: Major Film
- Distributed by: CEI Film
- Release date: 30 August 1950
- Running time: 97 minutes
- Country: Italy
- Language: Italian

Stormbound (Italian: La Strada finisce sul fiume) is a 1950 Italian crime melodrama film directed by Luigi Capuano and starring Constance Dowling, Andrea Checchi and Aldo Silvani. The film's sets were designed by the art director Alfredo Montori. It earned 64 million lire at the box office.

== Synopsis ==
Barbara, an American journalist, travels to Italy to interview outlaw Rol with whom she falls in love.

== Cast ==
- Constance Dowling as Barbara
- Andrea Checchi as Rol
- Aldo Silvani as Marco
- Bianca Doria as Maria
- Tino Buazzelli as Sergeant
- Mirko Ellis as Stefano
- Paola Quattrini as Nina
- Amedeo Girardi

== Bibliography ==
- Chiti, Roberto & Poppi, Roberto. Dizionario del cinema italiano: Dal 1945 al 1959. Gremese Editore, 1991.
- Curti, Roberto. Italian Giallo in Film and Television: A Critical History. McFarland, 2022.
