= Remember the Day =

1941 film by Henry King

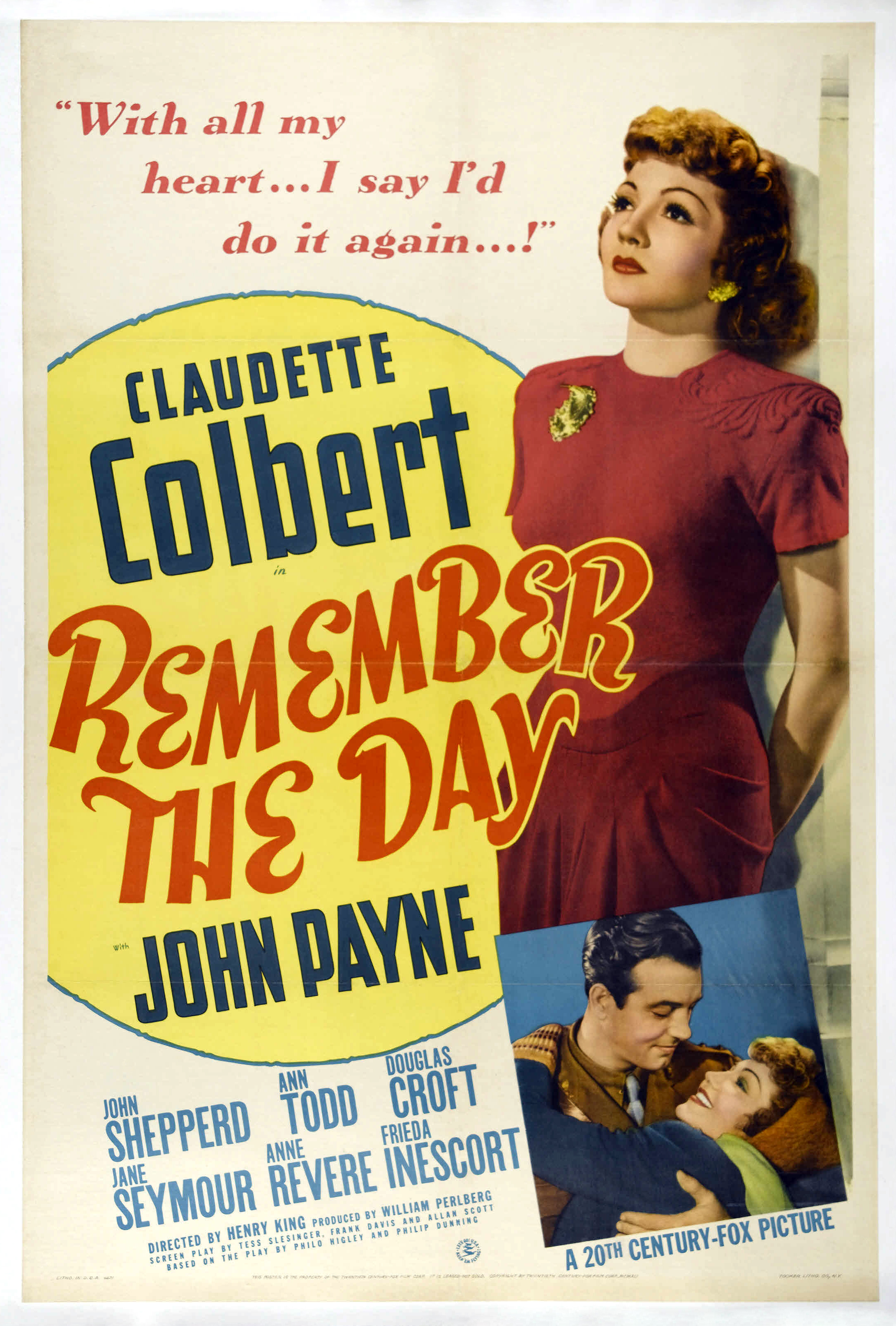
- Theatrical release poster
- Directed by: Henry King
- Screenplay by: Tess Slesinger; Frank Davis; Allan Scott; Henry King (uncredited)
- Based on: Remember the Day by Philo Higley and Philip Dunning
- Produced by: William Perlberg
- Starring: Claudette Colbert; John Payne; John Shepperd; Ann Todd
- Cinematography: George Barnes
- Edited by: Barbara McLean
- Music by: Alfred Newman; David Buttolph; Hugo Friedhofer; Cyril J. Mockridge; David Raksin; Charles Bradshaw
- Production company: 20th Century Fox
- Distributed by: 20th Century Fox
- Release date: December 25, 1941
- Running time: 86 minutes
- Country: United States
- Language: English
- Box office: $1.1 million (US rentals)

Remember the Day is a 1941 American drama film directed by Henry King and starring Claudette Colbert, John Payne and John Shepperd. The film was produced and released by 20th Century Fox. It was based on a play of the same title by Philo Higley and Philip Dunning.

== Plot ==
Elderly schoolteacher Nora Trinell reflects on her life and teaching career while waiting to see Dewey Roberts, formerly her student and currently a presidential nominee. This film is reminiscent of Cheers for Miss Bishop (released ten months earlier, in February 1941) and 1955's Good Morning, Miss Dove.

== Cast ==
- Claudette Colbert as Nora Trinell
- John Payne as Dan Hopkins
- John Shepperd as Dewey Roberts
- Ann Todd as Kate Hill
- Douglas Croft as Dewey Roberts (as a boy)
- Jane Seymour as Mrs. Roberts
- Anne Revere as Miss Price
- Frieda Inescort as Mrs. Dewey Roberts
- Harry Hayden as Mr. Roberts
- Francis Pierlot as Mr. Steele
- Marie Blake as Miss Cartwright
- William Henderson as Peter
- Chick Chandler as Mr. Mason
- Selmar Jackson as Graham
- William Halligan as Tom Hanlon
- George Ernest as Bill Tower
- Harry Tyler as Mr. Avery
- Jody Gilbert as Mrs. Avery
- Irving Bacon as Cecil
- Paul Harvey as Senator Phillips
- Thurston Hall as Governor Teller
- Billy Dawson as Steve Hill
- George Chandler as Telegraph Clerk
- Geraldine Hall as Beaulah

== Bibliography ==
- Dick, Bernard F. Claudette Colbert: She Walked in Beauty. University Press of Mississippi, 2008.
- Goble, Alan. The Complete Index to Literary Sources in Film. Walter de Gruyter, 1999.
