= Jane Seymour (Canadian actress) =

Canadian-American actress

- Born: Marjorie Seymour Fitz-patrick; 24 March 1893; Hamilton, Ontario, Canada
- Died: January 30, 1956 (aged 62)
- Occupation: Actress
- Years active: 1939–1955

Jane Seymour (born Marjorie Seymour Fitz-patrick; March 24, 1893 – January 30, 1956) was a Canadian-American film and television actress known for her performance in films including playing mom in Tom, Dick and Harry (1941) and for roles in several TV series.

== Filmography ==
Year	Title	Role	Notes	Ref(s)
1939	Backdoor to Heaven	Frankie's Mother		
1941	Tom, Dick and Harry	Ma		
1941	Remember the Day	Mrs. Roberts		
