= Amy Allison Grant =

American performer

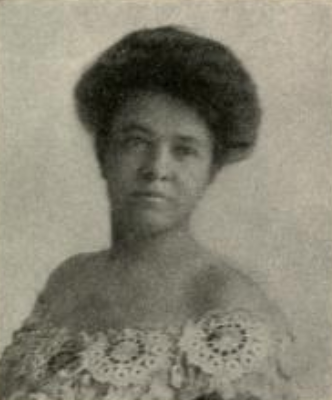
- Amy Allison Grant, from the 1906 yearbook of Teachers College, Columbia University
- Born: 1880; Chicago, Illinois, U.S.
- Died: After 1930
- Occupation(s): Singer, dramatic reader

Amy Allison Grant (born 1880, died after 1930) was an early 20th century American performer, particularly of recitations of poetry and operas, with musical accompaniment.

== Early life and education ==
Grant was born in Chicago, the daughter of Samuel Veall Grant and Dorcas Emma Hill Grant. She trained as a singer with David Ffrangcon-Davies. She graduated from the Stanhope Wheatcroft Dramatic School in 1898, and from Teachers College, Columbia University in 1908. She also studied at the University of Chicago, the Chicago Musical College, and the University of Oxford.

== Career ==
Grant performed dramatic recitations of poetry with musical accompaniment. Her signature piece was Tennyson's Enoch Arden, with music by Richard Strauss. She translated, abridged or otherwise arranged her own adaptations of opera libretti. She gave recitals at her studio on West 55th Street in New York, in private homes, at the Hartford Golf Club, and at New York's Aeolian Hall and Plaza Hotel, with programming that followed the Metropolitan Opera and Chicago Opera offerings. Her performances were described as preparing her audiences to better enjoy a night at the opera, with an understanding of the story and music. She also taught voice students, and performed in Florida during winters in the 1920s.

In 1909 Grant hosted a benefit concert for the William Lloyd Garrison Equal Rights Association, a women's suffrage organization, at her New York studio. During World War I, she gave a series of benefits for the American Red Cross. In 1924, she gave a benefit recital for a new Episcopal church building in Palm Beach, Florida. She was a member of the Authors League, and associate editor of The Musical Monitor.

== Reception ==
"Mrs. Grant has a fine presence," commented one newspaper reviewer in 1902. "She is graceful, natural, and with more experience will become a successful interpretator." She had that added experience in 1914, when another reviewer wrote that Grant "did not allow herself to be led into any unbalanced display of emotion and at all times spoke clearly and with sincerity." Grant "has a remarkable voice and a powerful stage presence," noted a Rhode Island newspaper after her 1917 performance of Salome.

== Publications ==
- "The Institute of Politics at Williamstown" (1923)
- "Early Opera in Germany" (1923)
- "The Opera Singer of the Eighteenth Century" (1924)
- "George Frederick Handel" (1924)
- "Roland Hinton Perry, Sculptor and Painter" (1924)
- "Christoph Willibald Gluck" (1924)
