= Prudence Neff =

American musician (1887–1949)

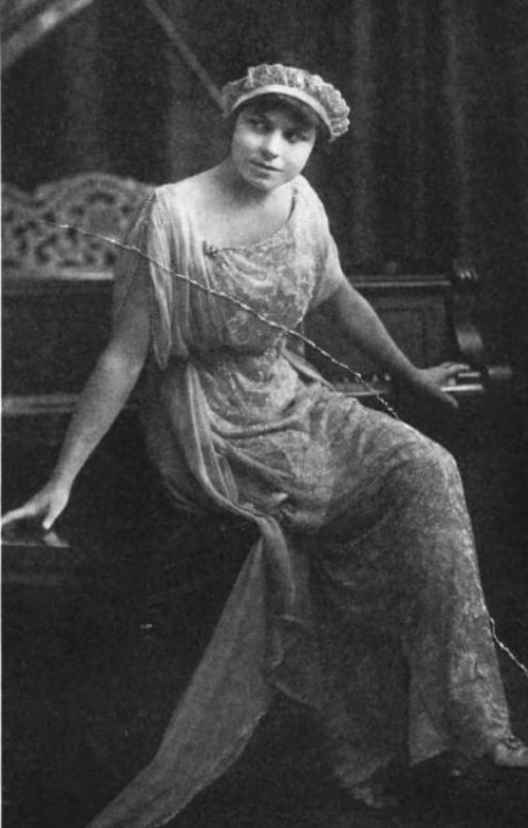
- Prudence Neff, from a 1915 publication
- Born: June 9, 1887; Nebraska City, Nebraska
- Died: December 23, 1949 (aged 62); Chicago, Illinois
- Other names: Prudence Dolejsi, Prudence Neff Thomas
- Occupations: Music teacher, pianist

Prudence Maria Neff (June 9, 1887 – December 23, 1949) was an American pianist and music teacher, based in Alabama as a young woman, and in Chicago for the rest of her career.

== Early life ==
Prudence Neff was born in Nebraska City, Nebraska, and raised in Chicago, the daughter of Anton Neff and Theresa Meyer Neff. Her father, who worked for the railroad, was born in Switzerland. At the Chicago Musical College, she studied piano with Glenn Dillard Gunn, and music theory with Adolphe Brune and Felix Borowski. Her "All-American" education was a selling point for Neff as a performer during the 1910s.

== Career ==
Neff was a concert pianist who toured the United States with Hugo Heermann and Maggie Teyte. She taught piano at Englewood Musical College in Chicago as a young woman, and at the Southern School of Musical Art in Birmingham, Alabama. In 1914, she gave the first performance of Felix Borowski's Piano Concerto in D Minor, with the Chicago Symphony Orchestra. She also played with the Russian Symphony Orchestra of New York. In 1915, she won a Southern regional piano contest, held by the National Federation of Music Clubs (NFMC) in Memphis. She represented the Birmingham Music Study Club at the NFMC national meeting in Los Angeles in 1915. "Prudence Neff has within a few years attained a degree of success rarely reached by the young aspirant to musical honors," said The Musical Monitor. She chaired the program committee of the NFMC in 1917, when its national biennial meeting was held in Birmingham. Also in 1917, she gave concerts on the lyceum circuit with her violinist husband.

After her first marriage ended, she moved back to Chicago, and taught piano there at the Glenn Dillard Gunn School of Music. She appeared on vaudeville programs in 1919. She continued performing through the 1920s and 1930s, often as an accompanist; she also made piano roll recordings, and gave concerts for radio. In 1933 she directed a choir of 30 voices in Palos Park.

== Personal life ==
In 1915, Neff married a fellow music teacher, Chicago-born Bohemian violinist Robert Dolejsi. They sometimes performed together in concerts. After they divorced, she married Wade H. Thomas; he died in 1933. She died in 1949, in Chicago, at the age of 62.
