= Domenico Meccoli =

Italian writer

- Born: 4 January 1913; Assisi, Italy
- Died: 21 November 1983 (aged 70); Rome, Italy
- Occupations: Film critic, journalist, screenwriter, actor

Domenico Meccoli (4 January 1913 – 21 November 1983) was an Italian film critic, journalist, screenwriter and occasional actor. Born in Assisi, Meccoli started his career as a journalist and a film critic for the magazine Cinema, and later for several decades he was film critic and chief editor of the magazine Epoca.

He wrote for nine films between 1939 and 1954. He was a member of the jury at the 16th Venice International Film Festival in 1955, at the 9th Cannes Film Festival in 1956 and at the 18th Berlin International Film Festival in 1968. In 1961 and 1962 he served as artistic director of the Venice Film Festival.

== Selected filmography ==
- Cardinal Messias (1939)
- Hurricane in the Tropics (1939)
- Flying Squadron (1949)
- Stormbound (1950)
- Tomorrow Is Another Day (1951)
- I due derelitti (1951)
- Tom Toms of Mayumba (1955, actor)
