= Frank Ross (producer) =

American film producer (1904–1990)

- Born: Frank Joseph Ross, Jr. August 4, 1904; Boston, Massachusetts, U.S.
- Died: February 18, 1990 (aged 85); Los Angeles, California, U.S.
- Education: Princeton University
- Occupations: Actor; Film producer; Writer
- Spouses: Jean Arthur (m. 1932; div. 1949); Joan Caulfield (m. 1950; div. 1960)

Frank Ross (August 4, 1904 – February 18, 1990) was a film producer, writer, and actor.

== Biography ==
Ross was born in Boston, Massachusetts, the son of a Dublin-born Irish immigrant tailor, Frank Joseph Ross Sr., and his wife, the former Dorothy Dellano. A graduate of Princeton University, Ross began acting (in an uncredited role) in 1929's The Saturday Night Kid, starring Clara Bow and Jean Arthur. He married Arthur in 1932. He only appeared in two more films. He began working behind the screen at Hal Roach Studios.

Ross' first (associate) producing credit was for the 1939 film Of Mice and Men. Other notable productions include the comedies The Devil and Miss Jones (1941) and The More the Merrier (1943), both starring his wife, swashbuckler The Flame and the Arrow, co-produced with Norma Productions and starring Burt Lancaster, and Biblical epics The Robe (1953) and Demetrius and the Gladiators (1954). Ross also formed his own film production company Frank Ross Productions.

Ross and Jean Arthur divorced in 1949. The following year, he married another actress, Joan Caulfield. She had large roles in two Ross-produced films, The Lady Says No (1952) and The Rains of Ranchipur (1955), and starred in her husband's TV series, the short-lived Sally and the more successful My Favorite Husband. The couple had one son before divorcing in 1960.

Ross shared an honorary Academy Award for the short film The House I Live In, starring Frank Sinatra, and was nominated three times: Best Picture for producing The Robe, and Best Writing (Adapted Screenplay) and Best Story, both for The More the Merrier.

On February 18, 1990, Ross died in Los Angeles, California at the age of 85 from complications arising from brain surgery.

== Filmography ==
=== As producer ===
- Of Mice and Men (1939) (associate producer)
- The Devil and Miss Jones (1941) (producer)
- A Lady Takes a Chance (1943) (producer)
- The House I Live In (1945) (producer)
- The Flame and the Arrow (1950) (producer)
- The Lady Says No (1951) (director and producer)
- My Favorite Husband (1953) (executive producer, TV series)
- The Robe (1953) (producer)
- Demetrius and the Gladiators (1954) (producer)
- The Rains of Ranchipur (1955) (producer)
- Sally (1957) (producer, TV series)
- Kings Go Forth (1958) (producer)
- One Man's Way (1964) (producer)
- Mister Moses (1965) (producer)
- Where It's At (1969) (producer)
- Maurie (1973) (producer)

=== As actor ===
- The Saturday Night Kid (1929) (uncredited)
- Sweetie (1929) (uncredited)
- Young Eagles (1930)

=== As writer ===
- The More the Merrier (1943) (screenplay and story)
- Walk Don't Run (1966) (story)
