= Knickerbocker Holiday (film) =

1944 film by Harry Joe Brown

- Directed by: Harry Joe Brown
- Written by: Maxwell Anderson (play); Kurt Weill (play); Thomas Lennon; David Boehm; Rowland Leigh; Harold Goldman
- Produced by: Harry Joe Brown
- Starring: Nelson Eddy; Charles Coburn; Constance Dowling
- Cinematography: Philip Tannura
- Edited by: John F. Link Sr.
- Music by: Werner R. Heymann
- Production company: Producers Corporation of America
- Distributed by: United Artists
- Release date: March 17, 1944 (United States)
- Running time: 85 minutes
- Country: United States
- Language: English

Knickerbocker Holiday is a 1944 American musical film directed by Harry Joe Brown and starring Nelson Eddy, Charles Coburn and Constance Dowling. It is based on the musical play of the same title set in the 17th century colony of New Amsterdam. The film's sets were designed by the art director Bernard Herzbrun. The music by Werner R. Heymann was nominated for an Oscar for best motion picture score.

== Cast ==
- Nelson Eddy as Brom Broeck
- Charles Coburn as Peter Stuyvesant
- Constance Dowling as Tina Tienhoven
- Ernest Cossart as Tienhoven
- Shelley Winters as Ulda Tienhoven
- Johnnie Davis as Tenpin
- Percy Kilbride as Schermerhorn
- Otto Kruger as Roosevelt
- Fritz Feld as Poffenburgh
- Richard Hale as Tammany
- Carmen Amaya as Gypsy Dancer
- Chester Conklin as Town Trumpeter (uncredited)

== Bibliography ==
- May, Lary. The Big Tomorrow: Hollywood and the Politics of the American Way. University of Chicago Press, 2002.
