= Tom, Dick and Harry (1941 film) =

1941 film by Garson Kanin

- Directed by: Garson Kanin
- Written by: Paul Jarrico
- Produced by: Robert Sisk
- Starring: Ginger Rogers; George Murphy; Alan Marshal; Burgess Meredith
- Cinematography: Merritt Gerstad
- Edited by: John Sturges
- Music by: Roy Webb
- Production company: RKO Radio Pictures
- Distributed by: RKO Radio Pictures
- Release date: June 13, 1941
- Running time: 87 minutes
- Country: United States
- Language: English
- Budget: $806,000
- Box office: $1,628,000

Tom, Dick and Harry is a 1941 RKO Radio Pictures American comedy film written by Paul Jarrico, directed by Garson Kanin and starring Ginger Rogers, George Murphy, Alan Marshal, Phil Silvers and Burgess Meredith. Rogers was working on the film when she was awarded the Academy Award for Best Actress for her performance in Kitty Foyle (1940).

Tom, Dick and Harry was remade as The Girl Most Likely (1957), a musical that was also the last film released by RKO.

== Plot ==
Janie is a telephone operator and a daydreamer whose fondest wish is to land a rich husband. Her boyfriend Tom, a car salesman, also wants to marry, and Janie dreams about married life with him.

Listening to a long-distance phone call between the wealthiest eligible bachelor in town, Dick Hamilton, and the girl whom Dick has been dating, Janie makes a wish that she could meet him. When an expensive car pulls alongside her, Janie perceives that her wish has been granted. However, the car is driven by garage mechanic Harry, who is driving it to be repaired.

Harry is immediately smitten with Janie. He spends time with her, kisses her and proposes marriage. Janie now daydreams about becoming a mechanic's wife.

Disconnecting a call, Janie causes a quarrel between Dick and his girlfriend. She meets Dick and falls for him. However, Tom and Harry are waiting for her, and Janie declares that she is engaged to all three men. After dreaming of becoming Dick's wealthy wife, she chooses him, but at the last minute, a kiss from Harry changes her mind one last time.

== Cast ==
- Ginger Rogers as Janie
- George Murphy as Tom
- Alan Marshal as Dick
- Burgess Meredith as Harry
- Phil Silvers as Ice Cream Vendor
- Joe Cunningham as Father
- Jane Seymour as Mother
- Lenore Lonergan as Butch, Janie's sister
- Vickie Lester as Paula
- Betty Breckenridge as Gertrude
- Sarah Edwards as Mrs. Burton
- William Halligan as Mr. Burton
- Gayle Mellott as Brenda Whitney Jr.
- Edna Holland as Miss Schlom, Janie's Boss
- Joseph E. Bernard as Judge in Dream
- Sidney Skolsky as Photographer

== Reception ==
In a contemporary review for The New York Times, critic Bosley Crowther called Tom, Dick and Harry "a delightful little fable" and wrote: "Of all the Hollywood bubbles which have been blown this way of late, here, we are happy to report, is one which doesn't go poof in your face. It floats off in the full-rounded splendor, and the memory lingers on. ... [T]he airy charm of the picture is in the way it spins along, popping with nifty dialogue and bubbling with visual absurdities."

The film earned a profit of $234,000.

== Bibliography ==
- Fetrow, Alan G. Feature Films, 1940-1949: a United States Filmography. McFarland, 1994.
