= Robert W. Russell =

American screenwriter

Robert Wallace Russell
- Born: January 19, 1912
- Died: February 11, 1992 (aged 80); New York City, U.S.
- Occupations: Screenwriter, playwright

Robert Wallace Russell (January 19, 1912 – February 11, 1992) was an American writer for movies, plays, and documentaries. He was nominated for two Academy Awards for Best Writing, Original Story and Best Writing, Screenplay on the 1943 film The More the Merrier.

He died in 1992 in New York City, shortly after his 80th birthday.

== Filmography ==
- Ring of Steel (1942) short U.S. Army film directed by Garson Kanin; narration read by Spencer Tracy
- The More the Merrier (1943) (screenplay)
- The Well-Groomed Bride (1946) (screenplay)
- The Lady Says No (1952)
- Come September (1961)
- Walk Don't Run (1966) (story)

== Plays ==
- Take Me Along (1959)
- Flora the Red Menace (1965)
- Queen Lear
- Washington Shall Hang
