= The Whistle at Eaton Falls =

1951 film by Robert Siodmak

- Directed by: Robert Siodmak
- Written by: Leo Rosten (additional dialogue)
- Screenplay by: Lemist Esler; Virginia Shaler
- Story by: Lawrence Dugan; Leonard Heath
- Based on: Original story from the research of J. Sterling Livingston
- Produced by: Louis de Rochemont
- Starring: Lloyd Bridges; Dorothy Gish
- Cinematography: Joseph C. Brun
- Edited by: Angelo Ross
- Music by: Louis Applebaum
- Color process: Black and white
- Production companies: Louis De Rochemont Associates; RD-DR Corporation
- Distributed by: Columbia Pictures
- Release date: July 11, 1951 (Portsmouth, New Hampshire)
- Running time: 96 minutes
- Country: United States
- Language: English

The Whistle at Eaton Falls (also known by the alternative title Richer Than the Earth) is a 1951 American social drama film directed by Robert Siodmak and starring Lloyd Bridges and Dorothy Gish.

== Plot ==
A newly promoted plant supervisor finds himself in the position of having to announce a layoff of his fellow workers.

== Cast ==
- Lloyd Bridges as Brad Adams
- Dorothy Gish as Mrs. Doubleday
- Carleton Carpenter as Eddie Talbot
- Murray Hamilton as Al Webster
- James Westerfield as Joe London
- Lenore Lonergan as Abbie
- Russell Hardie as Dwight Hawkins
- Helen Shields as Miss Russell
- Doro Merande as Miss Pringle
- Diana Douglas as Ruth Adams
- Anne Francis as Jean London
- Anne Seymour as Mary London
- Ernest Borgnine as Bill Street
- Arthur O'Connell as Jim Brewster
- Parker Fennelly as Issac
- Donald McKee as Daniel Doubleday
- Robert A. Dunn as Rev. Payson

== Production ==
The film's story originated when producer Louis de Rochemont was discussing the state of the decaying manufacturing mills of New England and its effect on labor with some friends who were members of the Committee for Economic Development. He was referred to Harvard professors J. Sterling Livingston and Paul Ignatius, who had been studying the situation.

The film's budget was approximately $500,000 and it was funded by two New Hampshire businessmen and de Rochemont, a native of Newington, New Hampshire. It was shot on location in Portsmouth, New Hampshire, de Rochemont's center of operations. He had filmed Lost Boundaries (1949) in the area and planned for more films to be shot there. Walk East on Beacon (1952), his next film, was shot primarily in New England.

The film was offered to British director Pat Jackson, but he withdrew following significant script changes that he disliked. Robert Siodmak was announced as the director in September 1950.

== Release ==
The film's world premiere was held in Portsmouth, New Hampshire on July 11, 1951.

== Reception ==
In a contemporary review for The New York Times, critic Bosley Crowther wrote:

Louis de Rochemont's disposition to vigorously tackle vital contemporary themes ... has lured him to take on a subject of staggering challenge and complexity in his latest "semi-documentary, drama, ''The Whistle at Eaton Falls." And it is no reflection upon his good intentions or his social integrity to observe that this overheated discourse on the relations of labor and management leaves much to be desired. ... Mr. de Rochemont and his writers are too fuzzy and superficial in the crisis which they have developed for the maneuverings of labor and management. They compel their harassed mill president to shut up shop and tum everyone off without even a serious attempt to convince the workers that they must cooperate for a while on part time. They put too much sentimental store by the magnetism of a New England town and the inertia of unemployed people in what is admitted to be a land of general prosperity. They build up extremist disaffection on the promises of a previously discredited boss. And they bring the whole thing to a happy ending by an easy, issue-jumping device. ... It is anticlimactic that the only solution of the labor-management equation suggested In "The Whistle at Eaton Falls'' is efficiency and prosperity. That one the world already knows.

== Bibliography ==
- Greco, Joseph (1999). The File on Robert Siodmak in Hollywood, 1941–1951. Universal-Publishers. ISBN 978-1-58112-081-3.
