= Lenore Lonergan =

American actress

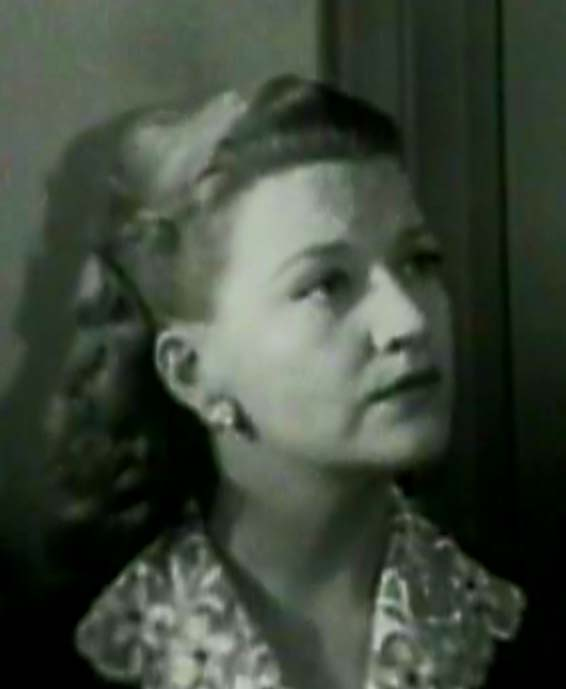
- Lenore Lonergan (1952) in The Lady Says No
- Born: June 2, 1928; Toledo, Ohio, U.S.
- Died: August 31, 1987 (aged 59); Stuart, Florida, U.S.
- Occupation: Actress
- Years active: 1941–1954
- Spouse(s): Chandler Cowles (m. 1951; div. 1954) Richard Bertram (m. 1972)
- Children: 1

Lenore Lonergan (June 2, 1928 – August 31, 1987) was an American stage and film actress during the 1930s, 1940s and 1950s.

== Biography ==
Vera Allen, Dan Tobin, Katharine Hepburn and Lenore Lonergan on Broadway in The Philadelphia Story (1939)

She came from a long line of actors; her paternal grandfather, Lester Lonergan, was an actor, and her father, Lester Lonergan II, was a renowned actor. Her mother, Julia Mary (Juliet) McIntyre-Lonergan, daughter of Hector McIntyre and Julia Fennell of Sydney, Nova Scotia, Canada, was also an actress and opera singer who trained at New England Conservatory of Music. There was a floor-to-ceiling portrait of her as Juliet Capulet from Romeo and Juliet that hung in their apartment at 58 West 58th Street in New York City. Her brother, Lester Lonergan III, was an actor as well.

Lonergan appeard in some Paramount films in 1933. She made her stage debut on Broadway at the age of 6, in Mother Lode, starring Melvyn Douglas. When she was 11, Lonergan was in the original cast of The Philadelphia Story on Broadway, playing the impish younger sister to Katharine Hepburn's character. A review in the trade publication Variety said, "Eleven-year-old Lenore Lonergan, of the veteran Lester Lonergan tribe, is acceptably precocious and makes much of her many fat lines."

She later played juvenile roles in Junior Miss by Jerome Chodorov and Joseph Fields, and in Dear Ruth by Norman Krasna. She appeared in Crime Marches On, Fields Beyond, and in the film Tom, Dick and Harry, among others. Later films included Westward the Women, The Whistle at Eaton Falls, and The Lady Says No.

A review of Tom, Dick and Harry in the trade publication The Film Daily said, "Lenore Lonergan, portraying Miss Rogers’ younger sister, turns in a performance that will make audiences wish there had been more of her in the picture, it is that good." When Photoplay magazine reviewed that film, it said, "A word should be said for Lenore Lonergan, too, as Ginger's kid sister. We hope R-K-O will give this promising youngster bigger roles very soon. She's grand."

On television, Lonergan portrayed the telephone operator in the Holiday Hotel series. She also appeared on Celebrity Time and Janet Dean, Registered Nurse.

When Lonergan was in her 20s a "severe case of stage fright" led to her retiring and running a pet store in Connecticut.

== Personal life and death ==
In July 1951 Lonergan married producer Chandler Cowles. She retired from acting then. She sued for separation in November 1954. She was married to Richard Bertram, and she had a son, John Holtzman. She died of cancer on August 31, 1987, in Stuart, Florida.

== Filmography ==
Year	Title	Role	Notes
1941	Tom, Dick and Harry	Butch	
1951	The Whistle at Eaton Falls	Abbie	
1951	The Lady Says No	Goldie	
1951	Westward the Women	Maggie O'Malley	
