= Ring of Steel (film) =

1942 film by Garson Kanin

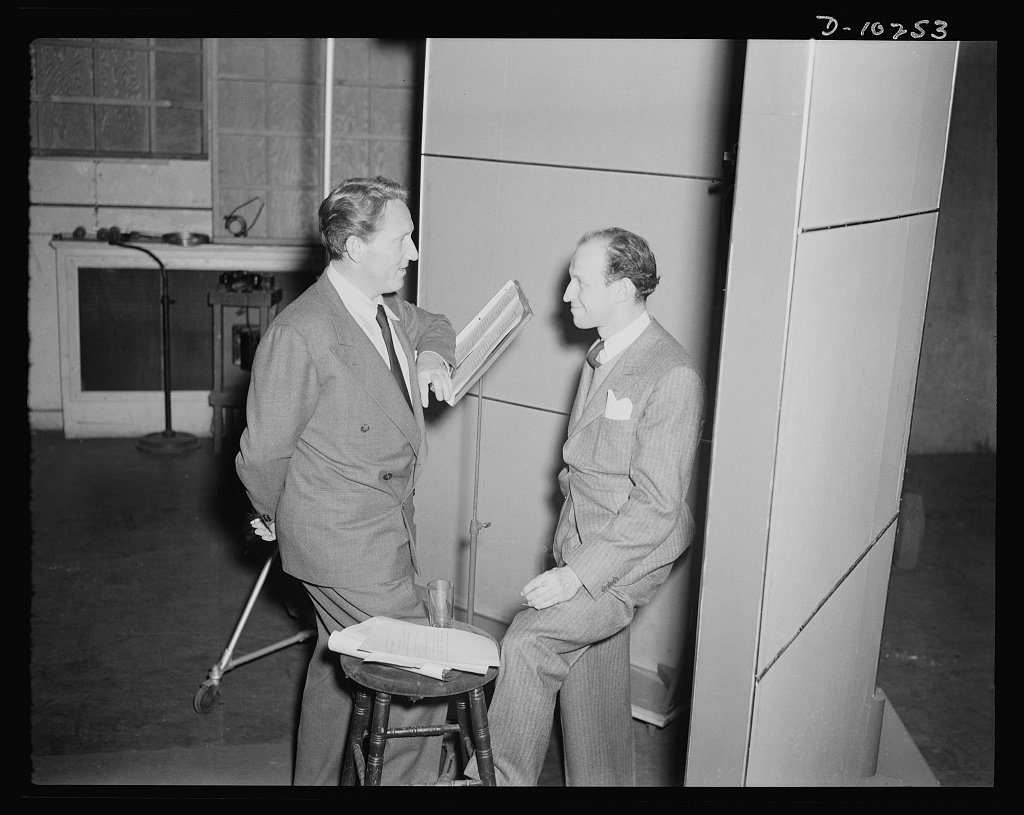
- Spencer Tracy (left) and Garson Kanin (right) at the Long Island studios of the Army Signal Corps for the recording of Tracy's narration for Ring of Steel
- Directed by: Garson Kanin
- Written by: Wallace Russell
- Produced by: Philip Martin Jr.
- Narrated by: Spencer Tracy
- Edited by: Robert Jahns
- Music by: Morton Gould
- Production companies: Warner Bros. Office for Emergency Management
- Distributed by: Office of War Information
- Release date: April 2, 1942
- Running time: 8 minutes 36 seconds
- Country: United States
- Language: English

Ring of Steel is a 1942 short documentary film directed by Garson Kanin and narrated by Spencer Tracy. "Dedicated to the American Soldier", the film was released on April 2, 1942, and distributed free to all U.S. theaters. The film was produced by Warner Bros. and the United States Office for Emergency Management.

== Synopsis ==
Spencer Tracy narrates a tribute to U.S. soldiers from 1776 to 1943, who have forged a "ring of steel" to protect American democracy.

== Production ==
Tracy's narration was recorded at the Long Island studio of the Army Signal Corps February 19, 1942. The music was composed by Morton Gould.

== Reputation ==
The Academy Film Archive preserved Ring of Steel in 2012. The film is part of the Academy War Film Collection, one of the largest collections of World War II-era short films held outside government archives.

== See also ==
- List of Allied Propaganda Films of World War II
