= The Well Groomed Bride =

1946 film by Sidney Lanfield

- Theatrical release poster
- Directed by: Sidney Lanfield
- Screenplay by: Claude Binyon; Robert Russell
- Story by: Robert Russell
- Produced by: Fred Kohlmar
- Starring: Olivia de Havilland; Ray Milland; Sonny Tufts
- Cinematography: John F. Seitz
- Edited by: William Shea
- Music by: Roy Webb
- Production company: Paramount Pictures
- Distributed by: Paramount Pictures
- Release date: May 17, 1946
- Running time: 75 minutes
- Country: United States
- Language: English

The Well Groomed Bride is a 1946 American romantic comedy film directed by Sidney Lanfield and starring Olivia de Havilland, Ray Milland, and Sonny Tufts. Written by Claude Binyon and Robert Russell, the film is about a man and a woman who fight over the last bottle of champagne left in San Francisco—he wants it to christen a new aircraft carrier, and she wants it as the centerpiece for her upcoming wedding reception. During the course of their fierce battle over the bottle, the two fall in love. This was de Havilland's first film after a two-year legal battle she waged against Warner Bros. regarding her rights under her contract.

== Plot ==
In the spring of 1945 in San Francisco, United States Navy lieutenant Dudley Briggs is promised a two-week furlough and a promotion by his ship's captain if he can acquire a bottle of French champagne by the next morning to be used in launching of the U.S.S. Vengeance, the Navy's newest aircraft carrier. Dudley heads to a liquor store and finds the last magnum of French champagne in the city—champagne having become rare during the war. Unfortunately, he loses the bottle to a beautiful young woman named Margie Dawson, who is about to be married to Army lieutenant Torchy McNeil, an Oregon football star, whom she has not seen in two years. Margie plans to present the bottle as the centerpiece for her upcoming wedding reception.

Dudley accompanies the couple to their hotel, where he tries to steal the magnum, but is unsuccessful in his efforts. Undaunted, he arranges a meeting between Torchy and his ex-girlfriend, Rita Sloan. When Margie finds them together, she calls off the wedding and goes out with Dudley in order to get back at her former fiancée. Following Margie and Dudley onto the Richmond Ferry, Torchy confronts them, insisting that a marriage must have only "one quarterback". After giving him the magnum, Margie again breaks up with him. On the ferry, Dudley confesses to Margie that he is in love with her, but she suspects he only wants the champagne. Their date is interrupted by Dudley's commanding officer, captain Hornby, who has them arrested and arranges for Margie herself to christen the ship with the bottle of French champagne.

Meanwhile, Margie's father arrives for her wedding. After finding Torchy in Margie's robe, has him brought to the Provost Marshal on a charge of insanity. Hornby arrives and has Torchy released so he can convince him to give up the magnum of champagne. When Hornby mentions Dudley's girl friend in front of Margie, she is certain Dudley does not love her. Margie's father, however, believes Dudley loves Margie and suggests that she return the bottle of champagne to Dudley to see what he will do. At first, Torchy and Rita refuse to give up the bottle, but when they see the U.S.S. Vengeance about to be christened with a tiny bottle, their feelings of patriotism inspire a change of mind. Torchy, the former football star, makes a perfect pass with the bottle of champagne, and Margie christens the ship. Soon after, Margie receives a telegram from Dudley instructing her to meet him with the biggest bottle of champagne she can find—for their wedding.

== Cast ==
- Olivia de Havilland as Margie Dawson
- Ray Milland as Lt. Dudley Briggs
- Sonny Tufts as Lt. Torchy McNeil
- James Gleason as Capt. Hornby
- Constance Dowling as Rita Sloane
- Percy Kilbride as Mr. Dawson
- Jean Heather as Wickley
- Jay Norris as Mitch
- John R. Reilly as Buck
- George Turner as Goose

== Production ==
The Well Groomed Bride was filmed between February 2 and late March 1945. The New York preview was held on May 10, 1946. The film was released in the United States on May 17, 1946. This was de Havilland's first film after a two-year legal battle she waged against Warner Bros. regarding her rights under her contract. The working title of the film was Night Before. Paramount originally planned to make a picture under the title The Well Groomed Bride in 1942, hiring Manny Seff and George Beck to write the screen story, and Melvyn Frank and Norman Panama to write the screen adaptation. The work of these writers was not reflected in the 1945 screenplay.
