= Julia Rebeil =

American musician and educator (1891–1973)

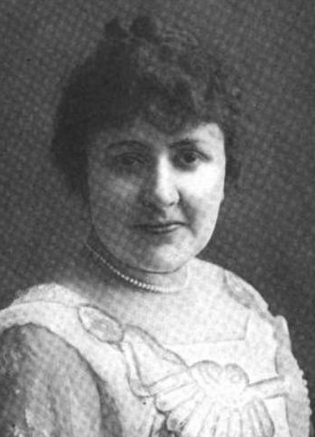
- Born: May 17, 1891; Arizona
- Died: October 18, 1973 (aged 82); Tucson, Arizona
- Occupations: Professor of music, University of Arizona

Julia Marie Rebeil (May 17, 1891 – October 18, 1973) was an American musician and music educator, and a professor at the University of Arizona from 1920 to 1969.

== Early life ==
Julia Marie Rebeil was born in Tucson, Arizona in 1891, the daughter of Andrés Rebeil and Concepcion (Chonita) Redondo Rebeil. Her father, who was born in France, was a merchant and bank president in Tucson. Her maternal grandparents were born in Mexico. She was part of the musical community of early Tucson residents, including the Ronstadts.

Rebeil graduated from St. Joseph's Academy in Tucson, and earned a bachelor's degree (1918) and a master's degree at the Chicago Musical College, and pursued further musical studies at the Fontainbleau Conservatory in Paris.

== Career ==
Rebeil performed internationally as a concert pianist. She also played and taught violin. In 1917, she won a national contest for young artists trained in the United States, sponsored by the National Federation of Music Clubs. She went to France in 1919 with the War Recreation Board, to entertain American troops.

Rebeil joined the music department at the University of Arizona in 1920, and was head of the piano program from 1926 to 1953. She became a full professor in 1930. Among her students were pianist and composer Ulysses Kay, music professor Walton Smith Cole, and pianist Constance Knox Carroll.

Rebeil retired from university teaching in 1969. She served on the boards of the Arizona State Music Teachers Association and Tucson's Saturday Morning Musical Club.

== Personal life ==
Rebeil died from a heart attack in 1973, aged 82, at her home in Tucson. The Julia Rebeil Memorial Scholarship was established at the University of Arizona soon after her death.
