= Constance Dowling =

American actress

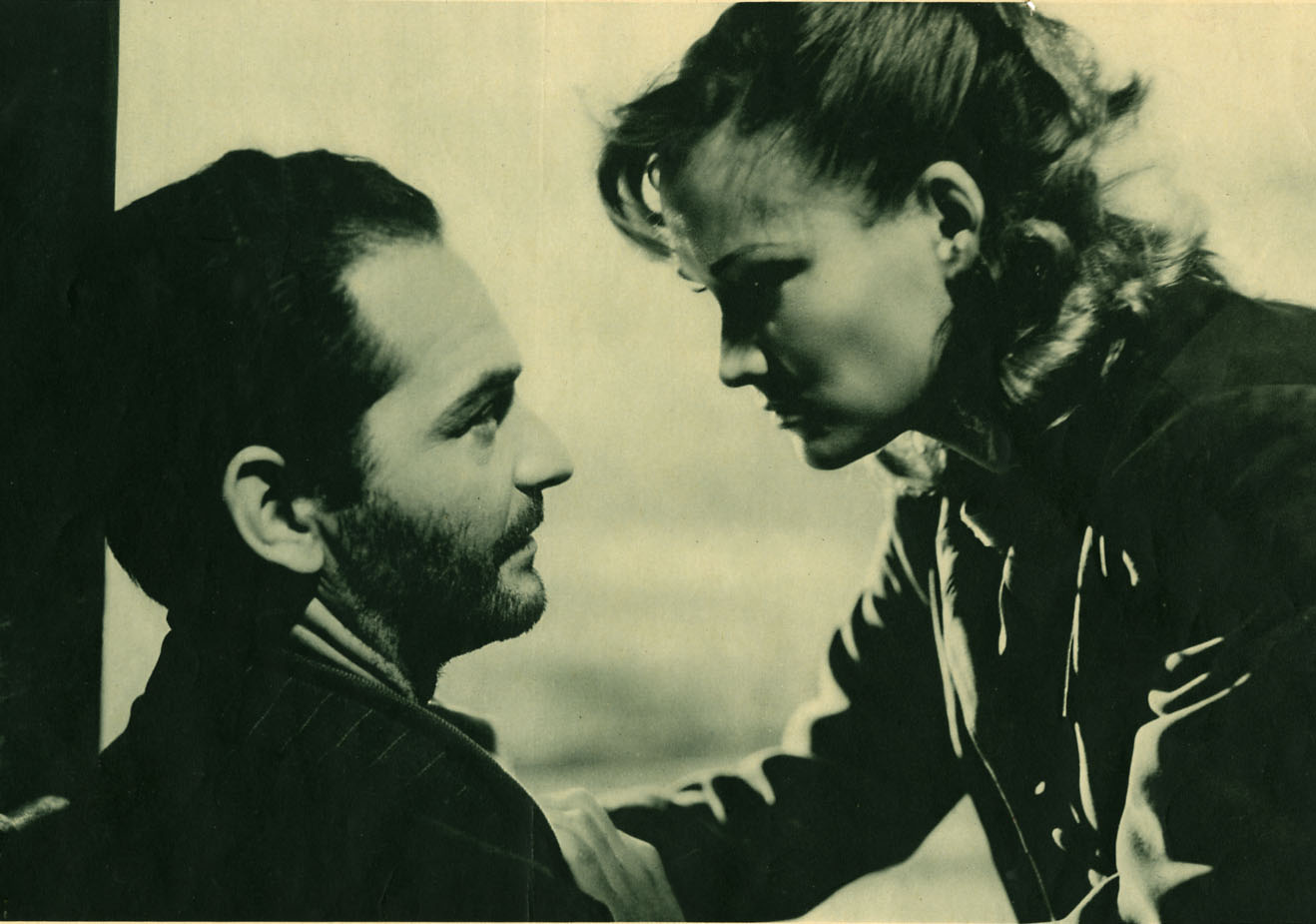
- Andrea Checchi and Constance Dowling in Stormbound (1950)
- Born: July 24, 1920; New York City, U.S.
- Died: October 28, 1969 (aged 49); Los Angeles, California, U.S.
- Resting place: Holy Cross Cemetery, Culver City
- Years active: 1944–1955
- Spouse: Ivan Tors (m. 1955)
- Children: 4
- Relatives: Doris Dowling (sister)

Constance Dowling (July 24, 1920 – October 28, 1969) was an American model turned actress of the 1940s and 1950s.

== Early life and career ==
Born in New York City, Dowling was a model and chorus girl before moving to California in 1943. She had two brothers, Richard Dowling and Robert Smith Dowling, and was the elder sister of actress Doris Dowling. She attended Wadleigh High School for Girls in New York City.

Dowling was a dancer at the Paradise nightclub in New York City, a job that she obtained by lying about her age to her employer and lying about the job to her mother.

== Stage ==
Prior to her move to Hollywood, she appeared in several Broadway productions, including Quiet City, Liliom, Panama Hattie (with sister Doris), Hold On To Your Hats, and The Strings, My Lord, Are False.

== Film ==
Dowling—promoted by press agents of producer Samuel Goldwyn as three-dimensional ("she can sing, she can dance and she can act")—began her screen career appearing in Up in Arms (1944) for Samuel Goldwyn. At the time, newspaper columnist Sheilah Graham reported that Danny Kaye "was hoping for a big movie name to star opposite him ... but boss Sam Goldwyn thinks otherwise and has signed" Dowling. In the same year, she appeared opposite Nelson Eddy in Knickerbocker Holiday,

In 1946, newspaper columnist Hedda Hopper reported that Dowling had signed a long-term contract with Eagle-Lion Films. Soon after having appeared in The Well-Groomed Bride (1946) and Black Angel (1946), she was loaned to Columbia Pictures to appear in Boston Blackie and the Law.

Dowling lived in Italy in 1947 through 1950 and appeared in several Italian films. Dowling returned to Hollywood in the 1950s and landed a part in the sci-fi film Gog, her last film.

== Personal life ==
Dowling had been involved in a long affair with married director Elia Kazan in New York. He couldn't bring himself to leave his wife and the affair ended when Dowling went to Hollywood under contract to Goldwyn. She was later linked with the famous Italian poet and novelist Cesare Pavese who committed suicide in 1950 after a lifelong depression aggravated, at one point, by having been rejected by Dowling who, in Pavese's poetry, is often linked to spring ("face of springtime"). One of his last poems is entitled "Death will come and she'll have your eyes".

In 1955, Dowling married film producer Ivan Tors, writer and producer of her last film. (Another source, published two years earlier, refers to Dowling and Tors as "honeymooning.") She then retired from acting, going on to have three sons and a foster child with Tors: Steven, David, Peter and foster son Alfred Ndwego of Kenya. (An obituary listed Ndwego as an adopted son rather than a foster son and spelled his last name Ndewga.)

In early 1964, Dowling introduced John C. Lilly to LSD for the first time.

== Death ==
On October 28, 1969, Dowling died at the age of 49 of a heart attack at UCLA Medical Center. Her burial was at the Holy Cross Cemetery in Culver City, California.

== Filmography ==
Year	Title	Role	Other notes
1944	Up in Arms	Nurse Lt. Mary Morgan	
1944	Knickerbocker Holiday	Tina Tienhoven	
1946	The Well Groomed Bride	Rita Sloane	
1946	Black Angel	Mavis Marlowe	
1946	Boston Blackie and the Law	Dinah Moran	Alternative title: Blackie and the Law
1947	Blind Spot	Evelyn Green	
1947	The Flame	Helen Anderson	
1948	Mad About Opera	Margaret Jones	Alternative title: Follie per l'opera
1949	City of Pain	Lubitza	Alternative title: La città dolente
1949	Addio Mimí!	Student	Alternative title: Her Wonderful Lie
1949	Una Voce nel tuo Cuore	Dolly	Alternative title: A Voice in your Heart
1950	My Beautiful Daughter	Lilly	
1951	Nash Airflyte Theatre		Episode: "Pearls Are a Nuisance"
1951	Pulitzer Prize Playhouse		Episode: "The Haunted House"
1951	Duello Senza Onore	Olga	Alternative title: Duel Without Honor
1951	The Adventures of Ellery Queen		1 episode
1951	Cosmopolitan Theatre		Episode: "Mr. Pratt and the Triple Horror Bill"
1951	La Strada finisce sul fiume	Barbara	Alternative title: Stormbound
1951–1952	Lights Out	Adele Bryan	2 episodes
1953–1954	City Detective	Karen / Sheila / Blonde Mrs. Nato	2 episodes
1954	Gog	Joanna Merritt	
1955	Fireside Theater	Betty	Episode: "Cheese Champion", (final film role)
