= Holiday Hotel (TV series) =

- Directed by: Peston Wood
- Starring: Edward Everett Horton; Lenore Lonergan; Don Ameche
- Music by: Bernie Green
- Composer: Gordon Jenkins
- Country of origin: United States

Production
- Producers: Carl Schullinger; Monte Proser; Edgar Peterson; Felix Jackson

Original release
- Network: ABC
- Release: March 23, 1950 – 1951

Holiday Hotel is an American television musical revue that was broadcast on ABC from March 23, 1950, until June 28, 1951 or October 4, 1951.

== Premise ==
A fictitious hotel on Park Avenue was the setting for this musical variety program, in which a "beleaguered manager" tried to "keep the bizarre tenants and guests under control." Each episode usually began with a comedy skit, after which the scene shifted to the hotel's ballroom, where the episode's guest stars entertained and musical production numbers occurred.

== Personnel ==
Edward Everett Horton was the initial star of Holiday Hotel, and Lenore Lonergan portrayed the telephone operator. During the show's summer hiatus in 1950, Don Ameche signed to replace Horton as the hotel's manager, effective with the program's return to the air on September 14, 1950. Bill Harrington and Betty Brewer were singers, and June Graham and Don Saddler were dancers. Other regulars included Walter Dare Wahl, Dorothy Greener, Florence Halop, Joshua Shelley, the Charles Tate Dancers, and Don Craig's Chorus. Guest stars included Vicki Cummings.

== Production ==
Carl Schullinger, Monte Proser, Edgar Peterson, and Felix Jackson were producers, and Peston Wood was the director. Bernie Green led the orchestra, and Gordon Jenkins wrote the music. Packard Motors was the only sponsor initially. On March 24, 1951, Arrow Shirts became a sponsor, with the companies alternating weeks. In late May 1950, Packard considered canceling the series, but the trade publication Billboard reported, "the fact that the program has become much stronger in recent weeks may work in its favor". The half-hour show was broadcast initially at 9:30 p.m. Eastern Time on Thursdays. In September 1950 it was moved to 9 p.m. E. T. on Thursdays. Holiday Hotel was replaced by Don Ameche Playhouse, which was also known as Don's Musical Playhouse.

== Lawsuit ==
On July 3, 1950, New York Supreme Court Justice Henry Clay Greenberg denied an application from Holiday Hotel of Swartswood, New Jersey, for an order to stop broadcasting of Holiday Hotel over WJZ-TV. The hotel had said that it had lost return customers after those people had watched the program. The justice said that the hotel needed to supply "clear and convincing proof" that use of the show's name was an intentional effort to mislead or deceive people. In contrast, he pointed out that the defendants (the show's sponsor, its advertising agency, and the network) had offered proof that the hotel's rights had not been violated.

== Critical reception ==
A review in The New York Times began by describing Holiday Hotel as "A show on which nobody seems very certain of what they are supposed to do next." Critic Jack Gould continued by writing that the show had no point of view and had "been put together with an amateurish casualness". In contrast, he found production of the program to be "lavish and eye-appealing", and he complimented the singing of Brewer and Harrington.

Billboard rated the show's musical components as "considerably better than the plot half". It complemented Brewer as "an appealing and fetching singer" but otherwise found little to like about the program, saying that it "starts out with a promising premise and runs down-hill in high gear, winding up out of gas as a helter-skelter bore".
