= The Rains of Ranchipur =

1955 film

- Original movie poster
- Directed by: Jean Negulesco
- Screenplay by: Merle Miller
- Based on: The Rains Came; 1937 novel by Louis Bromfield
- Produced by: Frank Ross
- Starring: Lana Turner; Richard Burton; Fred MacMurray; Joan Caulfield; Michael Rennie
- Cinematography: Milton R. Krasner
- Edited by: Dorothy Spencer
- Music by: Hugo Friedhofer
- Distributed by: 20th Century Fox
- Release date: December 14, 1955 (U.S.)
- Running time: 104 minutes
- Country: United States
- Language: English
- Budget: $2.9 million
- Box office: $2.6 million (US/Canada) $3.12 million (Overseas)

The Rains of Ranchipur is a 1955 American drama and disaster film made by 20th Century Fox. It was directed by Jean Negulesco and produced by Frank Ross from a screenplay by Merle Miller, based on the 1937 novel The Rains Came by Louis Bromfield. The music score was by Hugo Friedhofer and the cinematography by Milton Krasner.

The film stars Lana Turner, Richard Burton, Fred MacMurray, Joan Caulfield and Michael Rennie with Eugenie Leontovich.

Made in DeLuxe Color, Cinemascope, and four-track stereophonic sound, the film is a remake of the black-and-white film The Rains Came (1939), also made by Fox, directed by Clarence Brown and starring Tyrone Power and Myrna Loy. However, the 1955 film changes the novel's ending.

== Plot ==
In India to purchase some horses, British aristocrat Lord Esketh (Rennie) and his wife Edwina (Turner) come to the town of Ranchipur at the invitation of the elderly Maharani (Leontovich). Their marriage is an unhappy one, and Lord Esketh announces his intention to return to England and begin divorce proceedings. The spoiled, insensitive and notoriously promiscuous Edwina (she took a lover on their honeymoon) scoffs at this.

She renews in Ranchipur an acquaintance with an old friend and former lover, Tom Ransome (MacMurray), once a brilliant engineer, now a dissolute alcoholic. She also meets and attempts to seduce a distinguished Hindu physician, Dr. Rama Safti (Burton), a decent man who is the elderly Maharani's personal choice to succeed her someday.

At the end of the reception welcoming Lord and Lady Esketh to Ranchipur, the Maharani, who prepared for Edwina's arrival by reading newspaper clippings, sees that she has already begun to seduce Safti and confronts her. She is unworthy of her protégé, the Maharani says, telling Edwina about Safti's life. He is a very wise man, but “not experienced in matters of the heart.” The Maharani warns Edwina that for Ranchipur, she will do what is necessary.

Safti at first resists, but ultimately succumbs to Edwina's charms and falls hopelessly in love with her. Lord Esketh becomes aware of this, and when Safti saves him after he is mauled by a wounded tiger, he asks Safti about Edwina. Safti admits his love and Lord Esketh, now sympathetic toward this good man's plight, describes their marriage in blunt terms. Safti says he already knows about Edwina's past; he forgives anything she has done.

When Safti and Edwina talk about this, she finally confesses that her attraction to him has grown into something “so much more” that it frightens her. Safti believes that she can grow and change. Edwina says it isn't possible. Everything about it is wrong.

Meanwhile, Fern Simon (Caulfield) has returned home after graduating from the University of Iowa. The daughter of missionaries, she grew up in Ranchipur watching Ransome from afar. Her dreams of going back to teacher's college for graduate study are fading because they cannot afford it. At the reception, she diffidently asks Ransome for a loan of $1,000. He points out that this would wreck her reputation in Ranchipur, and moved by her disappointment, he agrees to help her get back to school somehow.

It has been raining off and on, but it begins in earnest, now, and continues through the film until the end.

Fern runs away from home and turns up soaking wet in Ransome's bungalow. She is thrilled with her plan—to ruin her reputation so her mother will have to let her go away to school, even though nothing will have happened because she will sleep on the sofa. He tells her she must go home immediately, bundles her into a raincoat—and kisses her. He apologizes and tells her the truth about himself: a disillusioned idealist who grew sick of the postwar world and hid in Ranchipur and the bottle. She meekly goes home.

At a party, Ransome, drunk and angry, warns Edwina to stay away from Safti, a friend whom he admires. Off-camera, the Maharani has ordered Edwina to leave the palace and Ranchipur. Safti says he will go with her.

Suddenly, Ranchipur is ravaged by a two-fold natural disaster: a series of earthquakes that shatter the dam and many buildings, and the ensuing flood, exacerbated by pouring rain, which wipes out buildings and bridges. After the first tremors, Safti runs for the hospital, leaving Edwina in a frenzy, partly caused by the fact that she is sick. Ransome takes her home to care for her. In the morning, Ranchipur is a lake, dotted with ruins, and it still rains. Debris blocks the narrows downriver, and plague spreads in the flooded areas.

Ransome's home is above the flood. A skiff pulls up to the porch. It is Fern, exhausted, cold and drenched. She has been out all night trying to get to him. Ransome settles her to rest and gently promises that he will not leave Ranchipur ever. He takes Edwina to the mission to Mrs. Smiley. In her delirium, and believing (correctly) that she may be dying, Edwina begs to have a message sent to Dr. Safti. It is delivered to Lord Esketh by mistake, and he begs Dr. Safti to go, admitting that he loves Edwina and always has. Dr. Safti is so busy saving lives that he cannot go.

An explosion echoes through the town: The blockage has been exploded by dynamite, causing the flood waters to recede. At the mission, Dr. Safti figures out that it was Ransome who risked his life to save the people of Ranchipur.

Shafti comes to Edwina at last. She is shaken by his statement that he would not have come to her, even if he had known she was dying, because of all the people depending on him for their lives. And when he talks of how much work there will be rebuilding Ranchipur, she realizes that his heart is there.

Leaving at last, Edwina tries to explain to the Maharani that her love for Safti has become true, so much so that she will make the sacrifice of leaving him for his own good. The Maharani refuses to accept this and taunts Edwina. Edwina warns the Maharani that someday there will be a woman she can't stop.

Safti comes to say goodbye, and tells her that she has given him a great gift, the knowledge that a man cannot live without love. In return, he tells her of the qualities he cherishes in her. They kiss gently.

She drives away from Ranchipur with her husband, wiping a tear from her cheek.

== Cast ==
- Lana Turner as Lady Esketh
- Richard Burton as Dr. Rama Safti
- Fred MacMurray as Tom Ransome
- Michael Rennie as Lord Esketh
- Joan Caulfield as Fern Simon
- Eugenie Leontovich as the Maharani
- Gladys Hurlbut as Mrs. Simon
- Madge Kennedy as Mrs. Smiley
- Carlo Rizzo as Mr. Adoani
- Argentina Brunetti as Mrs. Adoani
- John Banner as Oriental Dancer

== Production ==
The film was a remake of The Rains Came (1939), which had been co-written by Philip Dunne. Dunne later wrote about the remake:

All I ever contributed to the remake was the title: The Rains of Ranchipur. The writer and producer, both friends of mine, tactlessly, unkindly and repeatedly informed me that their script was infinitely superior to the one Julien Josephson and I had written, which they dismissed as too old fashioned and corny for our purposes. They decided not to use any of it, and in fact didn't. Unfortunately for them, in the process they eliminated the most important event of all, the naughty lady's death, thereby violating the very essence of author Bromfield's original design. They turned a noble tragedy, corny or not, into a mere romantic interlude and thus achieved what they deserved: a resounding flop.

The film was updated to include Great Britain's crown colonies which completely removed the gross exaggeration of the Indian middle class. Dr. Rama Safti (Burton) is transformed into the hero of the film. It also lessened the missionaries in the story.

=== Casting ===
20th Century–Fox borrowed Lana Turner from Metro-Goldwyn-Mayer. Joan Caulfield would not star in a film until Cattle King (1962). Fred MacMurray was cast in visually rich cinematic sequences as Tom Ransome.

Richard Burton, Michael Rennie, Eugenie Leontovich, Gladys Hurlbut, Madge Kennedy, Carlo Rizzo, Argentina Brunetti, and John Banner round out the cast. Martha Crawford Cantarini worked on the film doing stunts.

=== Score ===
Hugo Friedhofer was hired to compose the film's score. He didn't understand the need to change the name of the remake from its original name. The theme was on the album Musical Themes of Hollywood U.S.A. (October 1957) with Jack Shaindlin conducting Symphony Of The Air on Roulette Records (R–25023).

== Reception ==
=== Release ===
The Rains of Ranchipur made $2.6 million domestically and $5.72 million worldwide.

=== Home media ===
The Rains of Ranchipur was released on Blu-ray on November 13, 2012, by Twilight Time.

=== Critical response ===
Henry Ward of The Pittsburgh Press wrote: "The movie may be somewhat short on drama and life like portrayals, but it more than makes up for this deflect with one of the most terrifying thundering disasters we have in many a monsoon."

The New York Times wrote: "Time and Twentieth Century-Fox do not appear to have worked wonders for Mr. Bromfield's work. It is still largely a romantic saga strikingly over-shadowed by its authentic Pakistani locales and an explosively shattering climactic earthquake and flood photographed in excellent color. And these spectacles are eminently enhanced by the wide-screen vistas of CinemaScope."

Film scholar Richard Dyer has argued that The Rains of Ranchipur, like a number of other contemporary (post-WWII; and post-Colonial) films, are orientalist, besides "ultra-colonialist" and "white supremacist", and that the function of those movies is to "attempt to recapture the supposed scrutiny of an inequitable past".

== See also ==
- List of American films of 1955
