= Emmy Brady Rogers =

American pianist

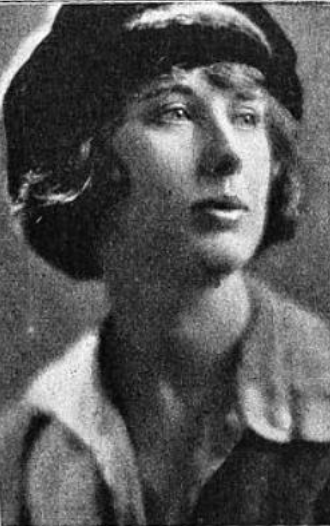
- Emmy Brady (later Rogers), from a 1927 publication
- Born: Emma Brady; October 6, 1897; Hoosick Falls, New York, U.S.
- Died: September 8, 1985 (aged 87); Aspen, Colorado, U.S.
- Occupations: Pianist, music educator, music critic, composer

Emma "Emmy" Cumine Brady Rogers (October 6, 1897 – September 8, 1985) was an American pianist, music educator, composer, and music critic at the Rocky Mountain News.

== Early life and education ==
Emma Brady was born in Hoosick Falls, New York, to her English parents. Emma's father Joshua Henry Brady was an engineer and inventor. He died three months after Emma's birth. Her mother Agnes H. Brady-Rhames was a music teacher. Her brother Charles Henry Brady was an Episcopal minister, Her brother Joshua Wilson Brady was a cartoonist and a Catholic priest. Her other brother William Veirs Brady was a civil engineer.

Brady graduated from Northwestern University, and earned a Master of Music degree from the Chicago Musical College. She also had a degree in Music Education from the Colorado State College of Education. She also studied with Alexander Raab, Joseph Lhevinne, Artur Schnabel, and Arne Oldberg. She also studied composition with Nadia Boulanger.

== Career ==
Brady was a "Chicago pianist" and piano teacher as a young woman. She taught piano at Chadron State Normal College in Nebraska beginning in 1931, and later at the Lamont School of Music in Denver. She performed with the Denver Civic Orchestra and played on radio programs.

Rogers became a music critic and composer. She played her own composition, "Platte Valley", with the Colorado State College of Education symphony in 1953, and with the Fort Collins Civic Symphony in 1956. Works by Rogers were included in a concert featuring works by Colorado composers, as part of the Kennedy Center's Bicentennial programming in 1976.

== Writings ==
=== Compositions ===
- "New World for Nellie" (1961, words by Rowland Emmet)
- "Sleeping Beauty in Flowerland" (1966)
- The Little Rocket Who Lost His Way (1968, a children's opera, libretto and music by Rogers)
- "Platte Valley"
- "Mrs. Peregrine and the Yak"
- "The Fairy Lake"
- "Hushsong"
- "Sea Wrack"
- "Nocturne"

=== Articles and reviews ===
- "Eisenberg Outstanding as Soloist of Brilliant Symphony Program" (1950)
- "Merrill Delights in Red Rocks FInal Concert" (1950)
- "Speeches Added to Ariadne" (1954)
- "Ballet Dancers Thrill Red Rocks Audience" (1955)

== Personal life and legacy ==
Brady married Frank E. Rogers. She was a widow when she died in 1985, at the age of 87, at a nursing home in Aspen, Colorado. There is a collection of her papers in special collections at the Denver Public Library.
