= Charles Coburn =

American film, theater actor (1877–1961)

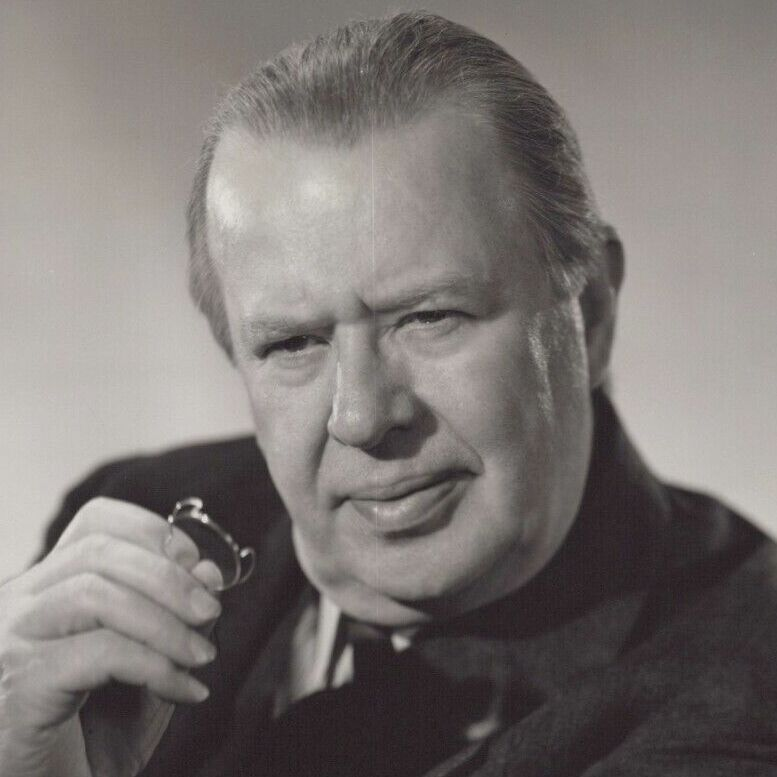
- Coburn in 1939
- Born: June 19, 1877; Macon, Georgia, U.S.
- Died: August 30, 1961 (aged 84); New York City, U.S.
- Resting place: Bonaventure Cemetery, (near Savannah, Georgia)
- Occupation: Actor
- Years active: 1901–1960
- Political party: Republican
- Spouses: Ivah Wills Coburn (m. 1906; died 1937) Winifred Natzka (m. 1959) (died 2017)
- Children: 7

Charles Douville Coburn (June 19, 1877 – August 30, 1961) was an American actor and theatrical producer. He was nominated for a Best Supporting Actor Academy Award three times – for The Devil and Miss Jones (1941), The More the Merrier (1943) and The Green Years (1946) – winning for his performance in The More the Merrier. He was honored with a star on the Hollywood Walk of Fame (in Hollywood, Los Angeles, California) in 1960 for his contribution to the film industry.

== Biography ==
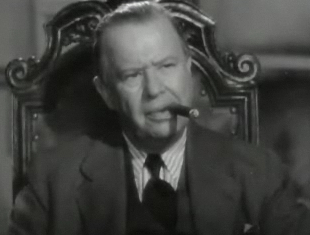
Charles Coburn in Road to Singapore (1940)

Coburn was born in Macon, Georgia, the son of Scots-Irish Americans Emma Louise Sprigman and Moses Douville Coburn.

Growing up in Savannah, he started out at age 14 doing odd jobs at the local Savannah Theater, handing out programs, ushering, or being the doorman. By age 17 or 18, he was the theater manager. He later became an actor, making his debut on Broadway in 1901. Coburn formed an acting company with actress Ivah Wills in 1905. They married in 1906. In addition to managing the company, the couple performed frequently on Broadway.

After his wife's death in 1937, Coburn relocated to Los Angeles, California, and began film work. He was nominated three times for an Academy Award for Best Supporting Actor - The Devil and Miss Jones in 1941, The More the Merrier in 1943, and The Green Years in 1946 - winning for his role as Benjamin Dingle in The More the Merrier. Other notable film credits include Of Human Hearts (1938), The Lady Eve (1941), Kings Row (1942), The Constant Nymph (1943), Heaven Can Wait (1943), Wilson (1944), Impact (1949), The Paradine Case (1947), Everybody Does It (1950), Has Anybody Seen My Gal (1952), Monkey Business (1952), Gentlemen Prefer Blondes (1953), and John Paul Jones (1959). He usually played comedic parts, but his roles in Kings Row and Wilson showed his dramatic versatility.

For his contributions to motion pictures, in 1960, Coburn was honored with a star on the Hollywood Walk of Fame at 6268 Hollywood Boulevard.

== Political activity ==
Born and raised in Georgia, Coburn was a member of the White Citizens' Council, which was part of a network of racist states' rights groups known as the Citizens' Councils. These groups were white-supremacist, opposed improving the conditions and civil rights of African-Americans and were known for their opposition to the Civil Rights movement.

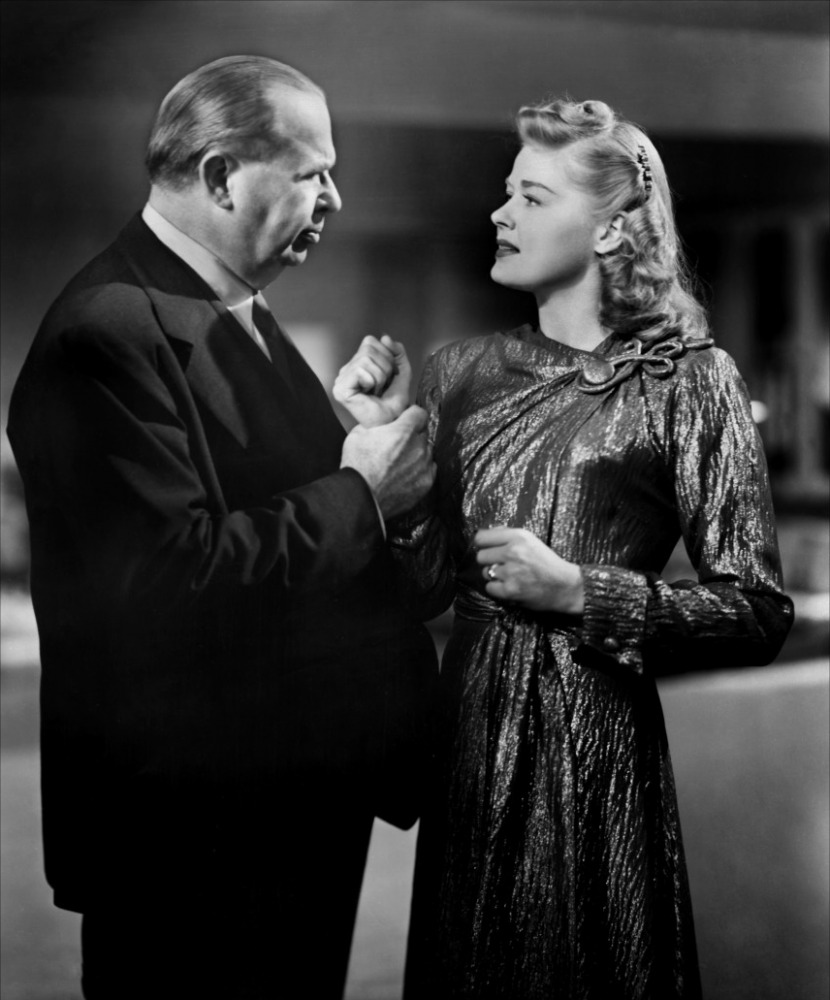
Coburn with Helen Walker in Impact (1949)

In the 1940s, Coburn served as vice president of the Motion Picture Alliance for the Preservation of American Ideals, a group opposed to leftist infiltration and proselytization in Hollywood during the Cold War.

A staunch Republican, Coburn supported Thomas Dewey in the 1944 United States presidential election.

== Personal life ==
Coburn married Ivah Wills on January 29, 1906, in Atlanta, Georgia. They had six children. They were married until her death in 1937.

In the 1940s, Coburn made his home at the National Arts Club in New York City. His late wife's mother lived there with him.

Coburn married Winifred Natzka on June 30, 1959, in Los Angeles. She was the widow of the New Zealand bass opera singer Oscar Natzka. They had one child, a daughter.

Coburn died of a heart attack on August 30, 1961, at age 84 in New York City. He was interred at Bonaventure Cemetery in Savannah. Winifried Natzka survived him by over 55 years, dying in January 2017 at age 98.

== Complete filmography ==
Year	Film	Role	Director	Notes
1933	Boss Tweed	Boss Tweed		A short.
1935	The People's Enemy	Judge Hays	Crane Wilbur	
1938	Of Human Hearts	Dr. Charles Shingle	Clarence Brown	
1938	Vivacious Lady	Mr. Morgan	George Stevens	
1938	Yellow Jack	Dr. Finlay	George B. Seitz	
1938	Lord Jeff	Captain Briggs	Sam Wood	
1939	Idiot's Delight	Dr. Hugo Waldersee	Clarence Brown	
1939	Made for Each Other	Judge Joseph M. Doolittle	John Cromwell	
1939	The Story of Alexander Graham Bell	Gardner Hubbard	Irving Cummings	
1939	Bachelor Mother	J. B. Merlin	Garson Kanin	
1939	Stanley and Livingstone	Lord Tyce	Otto Brower (safari sequences)	
1939	In Name Only	Mr. Walker	John Cromwell	
1940	Road to Singapore	Joshua Mallon IV	Victor Schertzinger	
1940	Edison, the Man	General Powell	Clarence Brown	
1940	Florian	Dr. Johannes Hofer	John E. Burch (assistant)	
1940	The Captain Is a Lady	Captain Abe Peabody	Robert B. Sinclair	
1940	Three Faces West	Dr. Karl Braun	Bernard Vorhaus	
1941	The Lady Eve	'Colonel' Harrington	Preston Sturges	
1941	The Devil and Miss Jones	Merrick	Sam Wood	Nominated - Academy Award for Best Supporting Actor
1941	Our Wife	Professor Drake	John M. Stahl	
1941	Unexpected Uncle	Seton Mansley aka Alfred Crane	Peter Godfrey	
1941	H. M. Pulham, Esq.	Mr. Pulham Sr.	King Vidor	
1942	Kings Row	Dr. Henry Gordon	Sam Wood	
1942	In This Our Life	William Fitzroy	John Huston	
1942	George Washington Slept Here	Uncle Stanley J. Menninger	William Keighley	
1943	Forever and a Day	Sir William (scenes cut)	[1]	
1943	The More the Merrier	Benjamin Dingle	George Stevens	Winner - Academy Award for Best Supporting Actor
1943	The Constant Nymph	Charles Creighton	Edmund Goulding	
1943	Heaven Can Wait	Hugo Van Cleve	Ernst Lubitsch	
1943	Princess O'Rourke	Holman - Maria's Uncle	Norman Krasna	
1943	My Kingdom for a Cook	Rudyard Morley	Richard Wallace	
1944	Knickerbocker Holiday	Peter Stuyvesant	Harry Joe Brown	
1944	Wilson	Professor Henry Holmes	Henry King	
1944	The Impatient Years	William Smith	Irving Cummings	
1944	Together Again	Jonathan Crandall Sr	Charles Vidor	
1945	A Royal Scandal	Chancellor Nicolai Iiyitch	Ernst Lubitsch	
1945	Rhapsody in Blue	Max Dreyfus	Irving Rapper	
1945	Over 21	Robert Drexel Gow	Charles Vidor	
1945	Shady Lady	Col. John Appleby	George Waggner	
1946	Colonel Effingham's Raid	Col. Will Seaborn Effingham	Irving Pichel	
1946	The Green Years	Alexander Gow	Victor Saville	Nominated - Academy Award for Best Supporting Actor
1947	Lured	Inspector Harley Temple	Douglas Sirk	
1947	The Paradine Case	Sir Simon Flaquer	Alfred Hitchcock	
1948	B.F.'s Daughter	B.F. Fulton	Robert Z. Leonard	
1948	Green Grass of Wyoming	Beaver Greenway	Louis King	
1949	Impact	Lt. Tom Quincy	Arthur Lubin	
1949	Yes Sir That's My Baby	Professor Jason Hartley	George Sherman	
1949	The Gal Who Took the West	Gen. Michael O'Hara	Frederick de Cordova	
1949	The Doctor and the Girl	Dr. John Corday	Curtis Bernhardt	
1949	Everybody Does It	Major Blair	Edmund Goulding	
1950	Louisa	Abel Burnside	Alexander Hall	
1950	Peggy	Professor 'Brooks' Brookfield	Frederick De Cordova	
1950	Mr. Music	Alex Conway	Richard Haydn	
1951	The Highwayman	Lord Walters	Lesley Selander	
1952	Has Anybody Seen My Gal	Samuel Fulton / John Smith	Douglas Sirk	
1952	Monkey Business	Mr. Oliver Oxley	Howard Hawks	
1953	Trouble Along the Way	Father Burke	Michael Curtiz	
1953	Gentlemen Prefer Blondes	Sir Francis 'Piggy' Beekman	Howard Hawks	
1954	The Rocket Man	Mayor Ed Johnson	Oscar Rudolph	
1954	The Long Wait	Gardiner	Victor Saville	
1954	Country Doctor			
1955	How to Be Very, Very Popular	Dr. Tweed	Nunnally Johnson	
1956	The Power and the Prize	Guy Eliot	Henry Koster	
1956	Around the World in 80 Days	a Hong Kong steamship company clerk	Michael Anderson	
1957	Town on Trial	Dr. John Fenner	John Guillermin	
1957	How to Murder a Rich Uncle	Uncle George	Nigel Patrick	
1957	The Story of Mankind	Hippocrates	Irwin Allen	
1959	The Remarkable Mr. Pennypacker	Grampa Pennypacker	Henry Levin	
1959	A Stranger in My Arms	Vance Beasley	Helmut Kautner	
1959	John Paul Jones	Benjamin Franklin	John Farrow	
1960	Pepe	Himself	George Sidney	

== Radio appearances ==
Year	Program	Episode/source
1946	Academy Award	“The Devil and Miss Jones”
1949	Duffy's Tavern	“Card Games”
1950	Duffy's Tavern	“Charles Coburn Plays Santa Claus”

== See also ==
- List of actors with Academy Award nominations
