= A Lady Takes a Chance =

1943 film directed by William A. Seiter

- Theatrical release poster
- Directed by: William A. Seiter
- Screenplay by: Robert Ardrey
- Story by: Jo Swerling
- Produced by: Frank Ross
- Starring: Jean Arthur; John Wayne; Charles Winninger; Phil Silvers
- Cinematography: Frank Redman
- Edited by: Theron Warth
- Music by: Roy Webb
- Production company: Frank Ross Productions
- Distributed by: RKO Radio Pictures
- Release date: September 15, 1943
- Running time: 86 minutes
- Country: United States
- Language: English
- Box office: $2.5 million (U.S. rentals)

A Lady Takes a Chance is a 1943 American romantic comedy film directed by William A. Seiter and starring Jean Arthur and John Wayne. Written by Robert Ardrey and based on a story by Jo Swerling, the film is about a New York working girl who travels to the American West on a bus tour and meets and falls in love with a handsome rodeo cowboy. The film was produced for RKO Radio Pictures by Frank Ross, who was Arthur's husband at the time. The supporting cast features Phil Silvers, Hans Conried, Charles Winninger and Mary Field.

== Plot ==
Three of her suitors protest when Molly J. Truesdale, on a whim, boards a bus from New York City to discover the American West. Molly attends a rodeo, where a bucking bronco tosses rider Duke Hudkins right into her lap. Duke buys her a beer and Molly brings him luck while gambling, but his friend Waco warns her that Duke is not right for her. Whenever Duke warms to her charms, Molly panics and shies away. Duke escorts Molly to various places and events until she learns that her tour bus has left without her. Her pride prevents her from accepting help from Duke and Waco, so she plans to hitchhike, but in the dead of night she meekly accepts a ride to the next bus depot from them.

The three camp outdoors overnight. The cowboys are comfortable but Molly is not, so she takes a horse blanket from Duke's horse Sammy. The next day, Duke is incensed when Sammy catches pneumonia. Molly makes one last-ditch attempt to snare Duke by preparing an elegant dinner, but Duke is reluctant. He insists that he will not sacrifice his freedom for love. Molly feels defeated and returns to New York and her waiting suitors, who are astounded when Duke suddenly appears to claim her. Together, they take the same tour bus back to the West.

== Cast ==
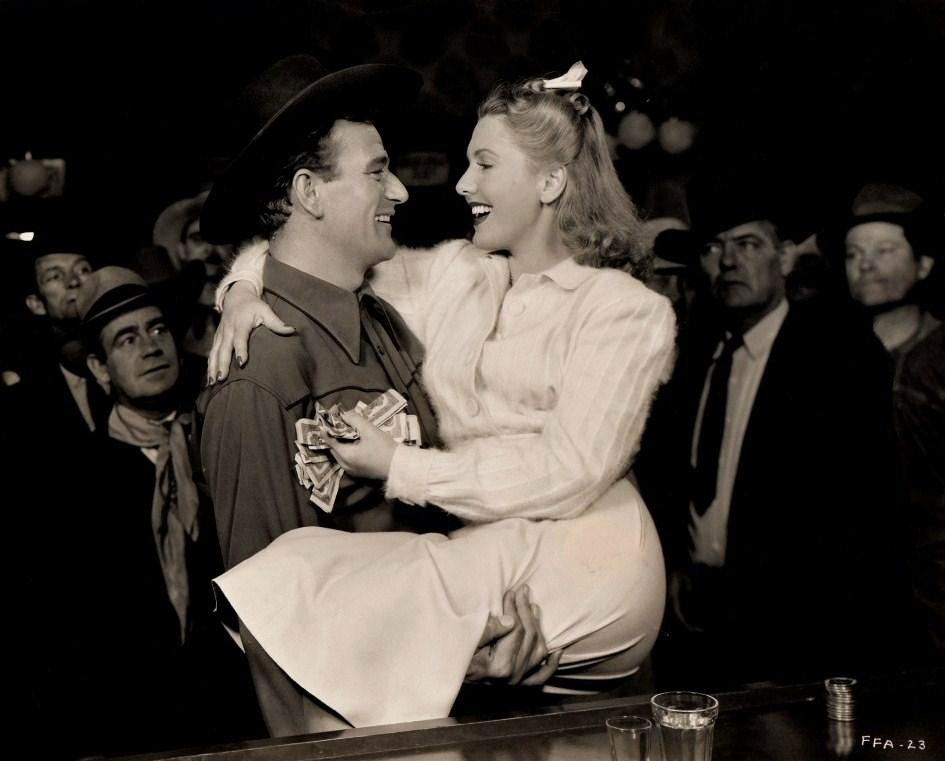
John Wayne and Jean Arthur in A Lady Takes a Chance

- Jean Arthur as Molly J. Truesdale
- John Wayne as Duke Hudkins
- Charles Winninger as Waco
- Phil Silvers as Smiley Lambert, bus tour director
- Mary Field as Florrie Bendix
- Don Costello as Drunk
- John Philliber as Storekeeper
- Grady Sutton as Malcolm Scott, suitor
- Grant Withers as Bob Hastings, suitor
- Hans Conried as Gregg Stone, suitor
- Jean Stevens as "Jitterbug"
- Ariel Heath as Flossie
- Sugar Geise as Linda Belle
- Joan Blair as Lilly
- Tom Fadden as Mullen
- Cy Kendall as Gambling Boss
- Dorcas McKim as Beggar Woman (uncredited)

== Reception ==
In a contemporary review for The New York Times, critic Theodore Strauss remarked that screenwriter Robert Ardrey "managed to brighten up an old formula until it looks almost brand new" and wrote: "If 'A Lady Takes a Chance' is quite continuously amusing, it is largely because of Miss Arthur's pert little ways, her prim hesitations at the wrong times, her uncloying coyness. Quite gradually she has become one of Hollywood's delightful comediennes. Mr. Wayne, with his muscles and slow drawl, makes a sturdy partner in this romantic duet. ... Put down 'A Lady Takes a Chance' as a plain, ordinary good time—which is what it sets out to be. What more can you ask?"

The Film Daily's review was positive: "Smart, clever romantic comedy should prove a box-office wow. Every moment of it is vastly entertaining and amusing beyond the ordinary. John Wayne turns in a far better job than one would have expected of him. One wouldn't be going overboard in saying it was his best work yet ... [Seiter] has brought out the fine qualities of the script masterfully. He has truly made A Lady Takes a Chance delicious entertainment."

Red Kann of Motion Picture Daily wrote: "If this is not on the riot side, it makes an unchallenged substitute. That's how delicious a comedy A Lady Takes a Chance proves itself to be ... On the side of performance, far and away of course is Miss Arthur. If your reviewer knew a better word for excellent, he'd use it. John Wayne has never done a better job within this knowledge ... No question whatever about this one. RKO has a hit on its hands."

The film accrued $2,500,000 at the box office, earning a profit of $582,000.
