= The More the Merrier =

1943 film by George Stevens

- Theatrical release poster
- Directed by: George Stevens
- Screenplay by: Robert Russell; Frank Ross; Richard Flournoy; Lewis R. Foster
- Story by: Robert Russell; Frank Ross
- Based on: Two's a Crowd screenplay by Garson Kanin (uncredited)
- Produced by: George Stevens
- Starring: Jean Arthur; Joel McCrea; Charles Coburn
- Cinematography: Ted Tetzlaff
- Edited by: Otto Meyer
- Music by: Leigh Harline
- Production company: Columbia Pictures
- Distributed by: Columbia Pictures
- Release date: May 13, 1943
- Running time: 104 minutes
- Country: United States
- Language: English
- Budget: $878,000
- Box office: $1.8 million (US rentals)

The More the Merrier is a 1943 American romantic comedy film produced and directed by George Stevens, and starring Jean Arthur, Joel McCrea, and Charles Coburn. The film's script—from Two's a Crowd, an original screenplay by Garson Kanin (uncredited)—was written by Robert Russell, Frank Ross, (Note: Frank Ross was Jean Arthur's husband at the time.) Richard Flournoy, and Lewis R. Foster. Set in Washington, D.C., the film presents a comic look at the housing shortage during World War II.

The film received six nominations at the 16th Academy Awards, among them Best Picture, Best Director for Stevens, Best Actress for Arthur, Best Writing (Original Motion Picture Story), and Best Writing (Screenplay). Coburn won Best Supporting Actor.

The film was remade in 1966 as Walk, Don't Run, starring Cary Grant, Samantha Eggar, and Jim Hutton. The setting was changed to Tokyo, which had experienced housing shortages due to the 1964 Summer Olympics.

== Plot ==
Retired millionaire Benjamin Dingle arrives in Washington, D.C., as an adviser on the housing shortage, two days early and finds that his hotel suite will not be available for two days. There are no other rooms available at the hotel, nor at any other hotel in town. He sees a classified ad for a roommate and talks the reluctant young woman, Connie Milligan, into letting him sublet half of her apartment. The next morning, after Connie leaves for work, Dingle meets Sergeant Joe Carter, who is interested in a room to stay for a week while waiting to be shipped overseas. Dingle rents him half of his half.

When Connie discovers the new arrangement, she angrily orders both men to leave, but is persuaded to relent because she has already spent the pair's rent. Joe and Connie soon develop a mutual attraction, though she is engaged to bureaucrat Charles J. Pendergast. Connie's mother married for love, not security, and Connie is determined not to repeat that mistake. Dingle seeks out Pendergast at a business luncheon the following day and decides that Joe would be a better match for Connie.

Joe and Connie talk about his past romances.

One day, Dingle chances on Connie's diary and reads aloud from it to Joe, including her comments about Joe. Dingle is caught by Connie, who again demands they both leave the next day. Dingle takes full blame for the incident, and retreats to his now-available hotel room. Joe gives Connie a traveling bag as an apology gift, and she allows him to stay until he departs for Africa in two days.

Joe asks Connie out to dinner that night; she is initially reluctant but decides she will accept his invitation if Pendergast does not call her by 8:00pm. At 8:00, Joe and Connie prepare to leave, but her teenage neighbor seeks her advice and delays her, and Pendergast then arrives downstairs. As Connie and Pendergast leave together, Joe spies on the couple from his window with binoculars. When the neighbor asks what he is doing, Joe flippantly tells him he is a Japanese spy.

Dingle calls Joe to meet him for dinner at a restaurant, where they run into Connie and Pendergast. Playing Cupid, Dingle invites Pendergast to his suite to discuss the housing shortage, so that Joe and Connie can be alone together. Later, Joe walks Connie home. The two share their romantic pasts and end up kissing on the front steps. Inside, a sleepless Joe confesses through his bedroom wall that he loves her. She tells him she feels the same way, but refuses to marry him, as they will soon be forced apart when he leaves for Africa.

Joe and Connie are interrupted by the arrival of two FBI agents, who have been tipped off that Joe is a Japanese spy. Joe and Connie are taken to FBI headquarters. They assert that Dingle can vouch for Joe's identity and innocence. Dingle arrives, bringing Pendergast. During questioning, Pendergast is shocked to learn that Joe and Connie share the same address. When they ask Dingle to tell Pendergast that their living arrangement is purely innocent, he denies knowing them.

Outside the station, Dingle says he lied to protect his reputation. Taking a taxi home, they all discuss what to do to avoid a scandal. Connie is angry that Pendergast only cares about his career and returns his ring. When another passenger in the shared cab turns out to be a reporter, Pendergast runs after him to try to stop him from writing about his fiancée sharing an apartment with Joe.

Dingle assures Connie that if she marries Joe, the crisis will be averted, and they can file for a quick annulment afterwards. With 26 hours until Joe leaves for Africa, they follow his advice and fly to South Carolina to wed, where a license can be more quickly obtained than in D.C. Returning home, Connie allows Joe to spend his final night in her apartment. As Dingle had foreseen, Connie's attraction to Joe may yet overcome her misgivings; this is facilitated by Dingle having arranged for the removal of the wall between their two bedrooms. Outside, Dingle changes the nameplate on the apartment door to read "Mr. and Mrs. Sgt. Carter".

== Cast ==
- Jean Arthur as Constance Milligan
- Joel McCrea as Joe Carter
- Charles Coburn as Benjamin Dingle
- Richard Gaines as Charles J. Pendergast
- Bruce Bennett as FBI Agent Evans
- Frank Sully as FBI Agent Pike
- Don Douglas as FBI Agent Hardy
- Clyde Fillmore as Senator Noonan
- Stanley Clements as Morton Rodakiewicz
- Henry Roquemore as Washington Sun reporter (uncredited)
- Grady Sutton as diner server (uncredited)

== Production ==
Jean Arthur got the ball rolling on The More The Merrier, paying playwright and writer Garson Kanin $25,000 to adapt his short story "Two's a Crowd" into a screenplay. She hoped to take the role of Connie and serve out her contract with Columbia Studios, which had become irksome due to her deteriorating relationship with studio boss Harry Cohn. Kanin co-wrote the script with Robert Russell and Frank Ross, Arthur's husband. Arthur also brought director George Stevens (with whom she had recently worked on 1942's The Talk of the Town) and co-star Joel McCrea to the project.

Principal photography took place between September 11 and December 19, 1942, with additional "inserts" filmed in late January 1943.

Stevens, known as a perfectionist, filmed many takes of each scene and shot from multiple angles. McCrea recalled that studio boss Cohn approached him during production, saying, "What's that son of a bitch Stevens doing, making all that film? He used more exposed film in one picture than in any five pictures I've ever made."

Stevens was working under a three-film contract at Columbia Studios, and completed the terms of his contract with The More the Merrier. He had previously shot two Cary Grant vehicles at Columbia—the melodrama Penny Serenade (1941) and the comedy-drama The Talk of the Town (1942). Less than a month after finishing work on The More the Merrier, he traveled to North Africa with the Army's combat photography unit. The More the Merrier was Stevens' last comedy, as he turned to drama and Westerns after the war.

In early drafts, The More The Merrier was titled Two's a Crowd. Other titles considered included Washington Story; Full Steam Ahead; Come One, Come All; and Merry-Go-Round, which actually tested best with audiences. Washington officials, though, objected to a title and plot elements that suggested "frivolity on the part of Washington workers". The More the Merrier was finally approved as the title.

McCrea was exhausted after already shooting three films in 1942, and signed on to The More the Merrier only at Arthur's request. The pair had a working relationship dating back more than a decade, having met on pre-Code romantic melodrama The Silver Horde (1930). McCrea was initially suspicious that the studio was willing to cast him as Joe Carter, feeling that if it were a good part, they would have pursued Grant or Gary Cooper, but the role later became his own favorite of his comic performances.

== Reception ==
=== Critical response ===
Contemporary reviews were broadly positive. Bosley Crowther of The New York Times enjoyed The More the Merrier, calling the film "as warm and refreshing a ray of sunshine as we've had in a very late Spring". He praised all three leads, the writers, and the director, singling out Coburn as "the comical crux of the film" who "handles the job in fine fettle".

Variety called it "a sparkling and effervescing piece of entertainment".

Harrison's Reports wrote, "Excellent entertainment! George Stevens' masterful direction, and the fine acting of Jean Arthur, Joel McCrea, and Charles Coburn make this one of the brightest and gayest comedies to have come out of Hollywood in many a season."

David Lardner of The New Yorker wrote, "As is the case with a lot of madcap comedies, this one tends to fall apart somewhat toward the end, when all the accumulated mixups are supposed to be resolved without a complete sacrifice of logic, but by no means are. As long as these mixups are purely being established, however, and nobody's worrying about clearing them up, everything is fine."

Time Out Film Guide noted, "Despite a belated drift towards sentimentality, this remains a refreshingly intimate movie."

In The Nation in 1943, critic James Agee wrote, "George Stevens's last film as a civilian ... is partly nice and partly disappointing. The chiseling, cringing sex and claustrophobia of war-torn Washington might have delivered a really original, really native comedy, and the types set up to carry this comedy are not bad in conception; they are spoiled in the execution."

TV Guide characterized the film as "[a] delightful and effervescent comedy marked with terrific performances" and praises Coburn as "nothing short of superb, stealing scene after scene with astonishing ease".

On the review aggregator website Rotten Tomatoes, the film holds an approval rating of 100% based on 19 reviews, with an average rating of 8.1/10.

=== Accolades ===
| Award | Year | Category | Recipient(s) | Result | Ref. |
|---|---|---|---|---|---|
| Academy Awards | 1944 | Best Picture | George Stevens | Nominated | |
| Academy Awards | 1944 | Best Director | George Stevens | Nominated | |
| Academy Awards | 1944 | Best Actress in a Leading Role | Jean Arthur | Nominated | |
| Academy Awards | 1944 | Best Supporting Actor | Charles Coburn | Won | |
| Academy Awards | 1944 | Best Writing, Screenplay | Robert Russell, Frank Ross, Richard Flournoy, and Lewis R. Foster | Nominated | |
| Academy Awards | 1944 | Best Writing, Original Motion Picture Story | Robert Russell and Frank Ross | Nominated | |
| New York Film Critics Circle Awards | 1944 | Best Director | George Stevens | Won | |

== Home media ==
The film was released on Region 1 DVD.
