= Henry Eichheim =

American composer

Henry Eichheim (January 3, 1870 – August 22, 1942) was an American composer, conductor, violinist, organologist, and ethnomusicologist. He is best known as one of the first American composers to combine the sound of indigenous Asian instruments with western orchestral colors.

== Life ==
He was born in Chicago, where he studied at the Chicago Musical College. He later went to Boston to play with the Boston Symphony Orchestra. After about 1912 he became more interested in conducting and composition than in violin performance; he was an early promoter of the works of contemporary French composers, particularly Debussy, Ravel and Gabriel Fauré, in the United States.

Following some trips to east Asia, including Korea, Japan, and China, he began to study the music of those cultures, and as a result began to use both the instruments from east Asia and Indonesia in his compositions, as well as some of the rhythmic and melodic elements of the indigenous music. He moved to Santa Barbara, California in 1922, although he continued to travel widely. On two of his trips–to Bali, and India—he went with Leopold Stokowski, a friend of his.

After Eichheim's death, the University of California, Santa Barbara inherited his collection of papers, photographs and musical instruments.

== Works ==
Some of his better-known compositions include Oriental Impressions (1919–1922), which contains transcriptions of Japanese, Korean and Thai melodies; Java (1929), and Bali (1931), which use instruments from the gamelan ensembles of those two islands; and The Moon, My Shadow and I (1926), a setting of poems by Li Bai.

He also composed a number of settings of poems of William Butler Yeats.

== References and further reading ==
- Dolores Hsu: "Henry Eichheim", Grove Music Online ed. L. Macy (Accessed March 3, 2005), (subscription access)
