= 16th Academy Awards =

- Official pamphlet cover
- Date: March 2, 1944
- Site: Grauman's Chinese Theatre; Hollywood, Los Angeles, California
- Hosted by: Jack Benny

Highlights
- Best Picture: Casablanca
- Most awards: The Song of Bernadette (4)
- Most nominations: The Song of Bernadette (12)

The 16th Academy Awards were held on March 2, 1944, to honor the films of 1943. This was the first Oscar ceremony held at a large public venue, Grauman's Chinese Theatre, and the first ceremony without a banquet as part of the festivities. The ceremony was broadcast locally on KFWB, and internationally by CBS Radio via shortwave. Jack Benny hosted the event, which lasted one hour and 42 minutes. This was the first ceremony to welcome admissions from the general public.

For the first time, winners for Best Supporting Actor and Best Supporting Actress were awarded full-size statuettes, instead of smaller-sized awards mounted on a plaque. This was the last year until 2009 to have 10 nominations for Best Picture; The Ox-Bow Incident is, as of 2025, the last film to be nominated solely in that category.

For Whom the Bell Tolls was the third film to receive nominations in all four acting categories. This was the first year in which each acting category had at least one nominee from a color film.

The Tom and Jerry cartoon series won its first Oscar this year for The Yankee Doodle Mouse; it would go on to win another six Oscars, including three in a row over the next three years, from a total of 13 nominations.

== Winners and nominees ==
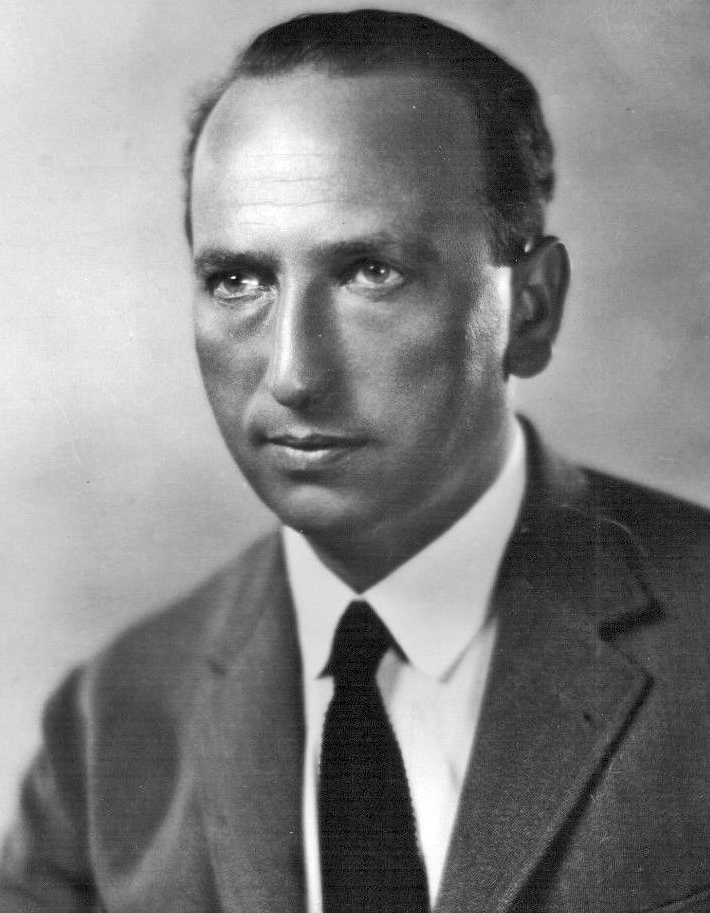
Michael Curtiz, Best Director winner

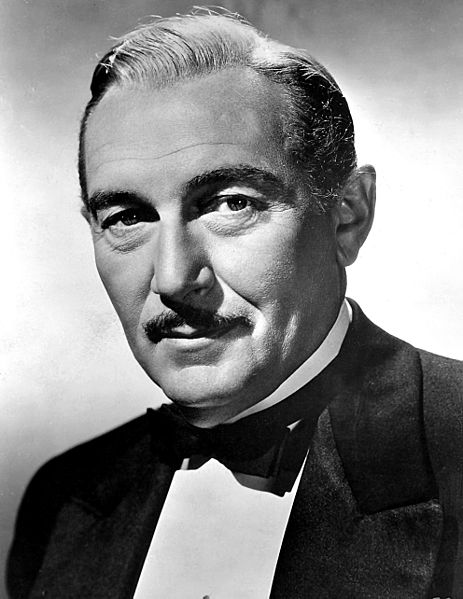
Paul Lukas, Best Actor winner

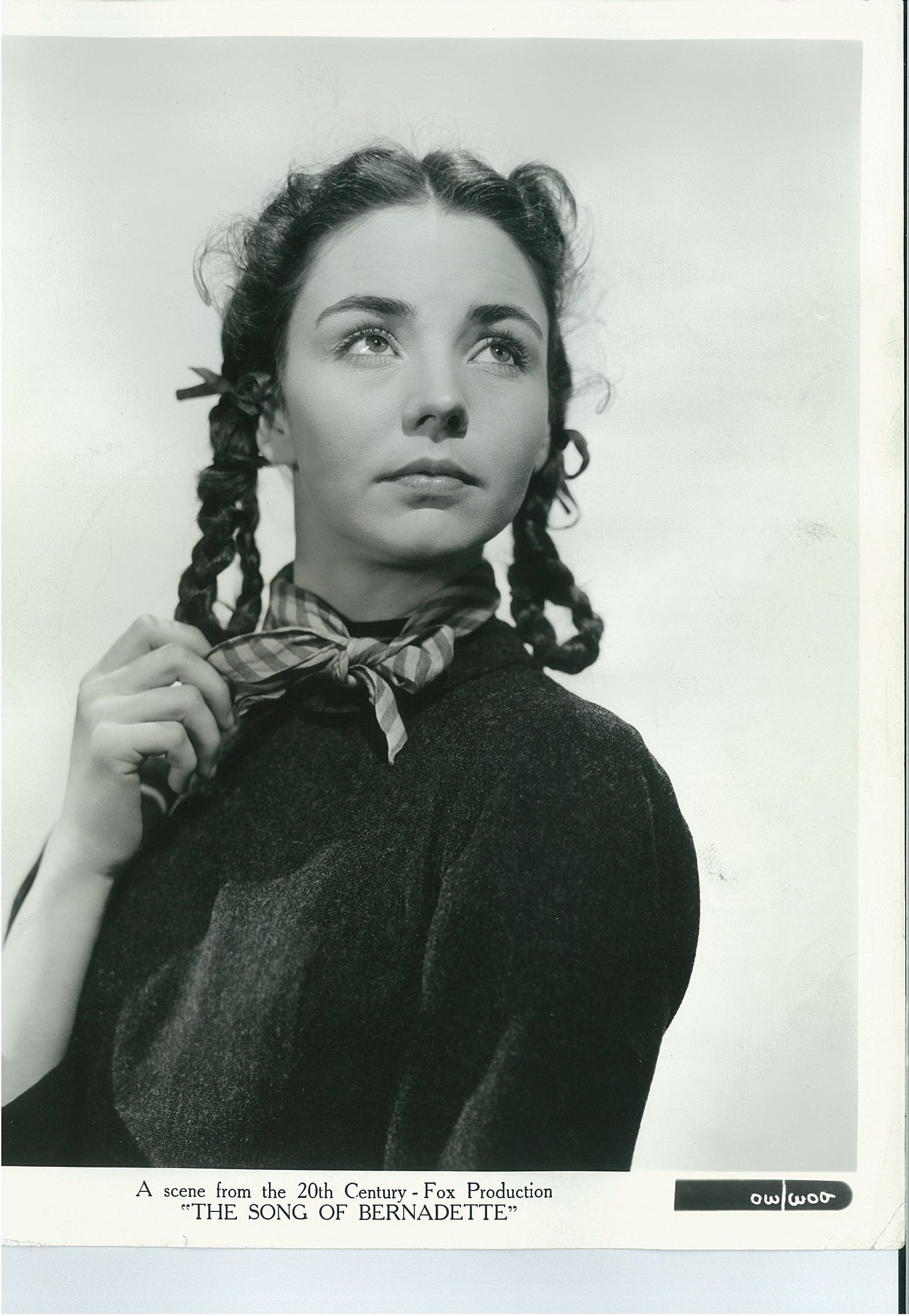
Jennifer Jones, Best Actress winner

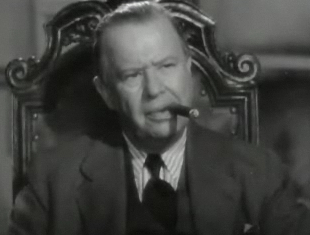
Charles Coburn, Best Supporting Actor winner

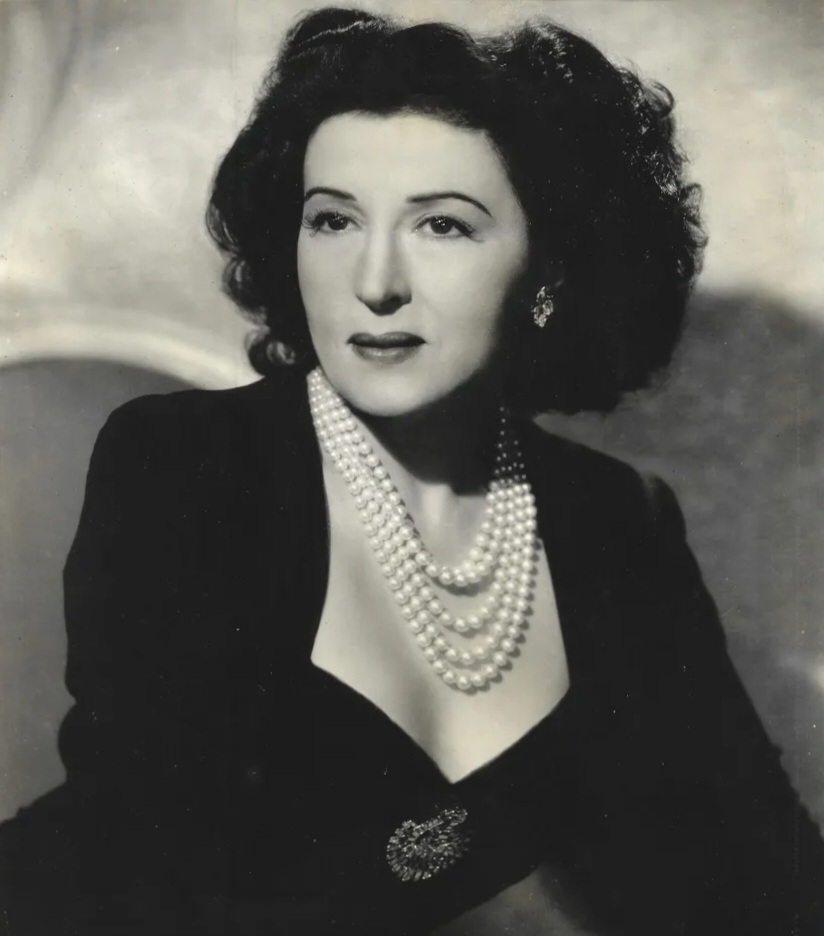
Katina Paxinou, Best Supporting Actress winner

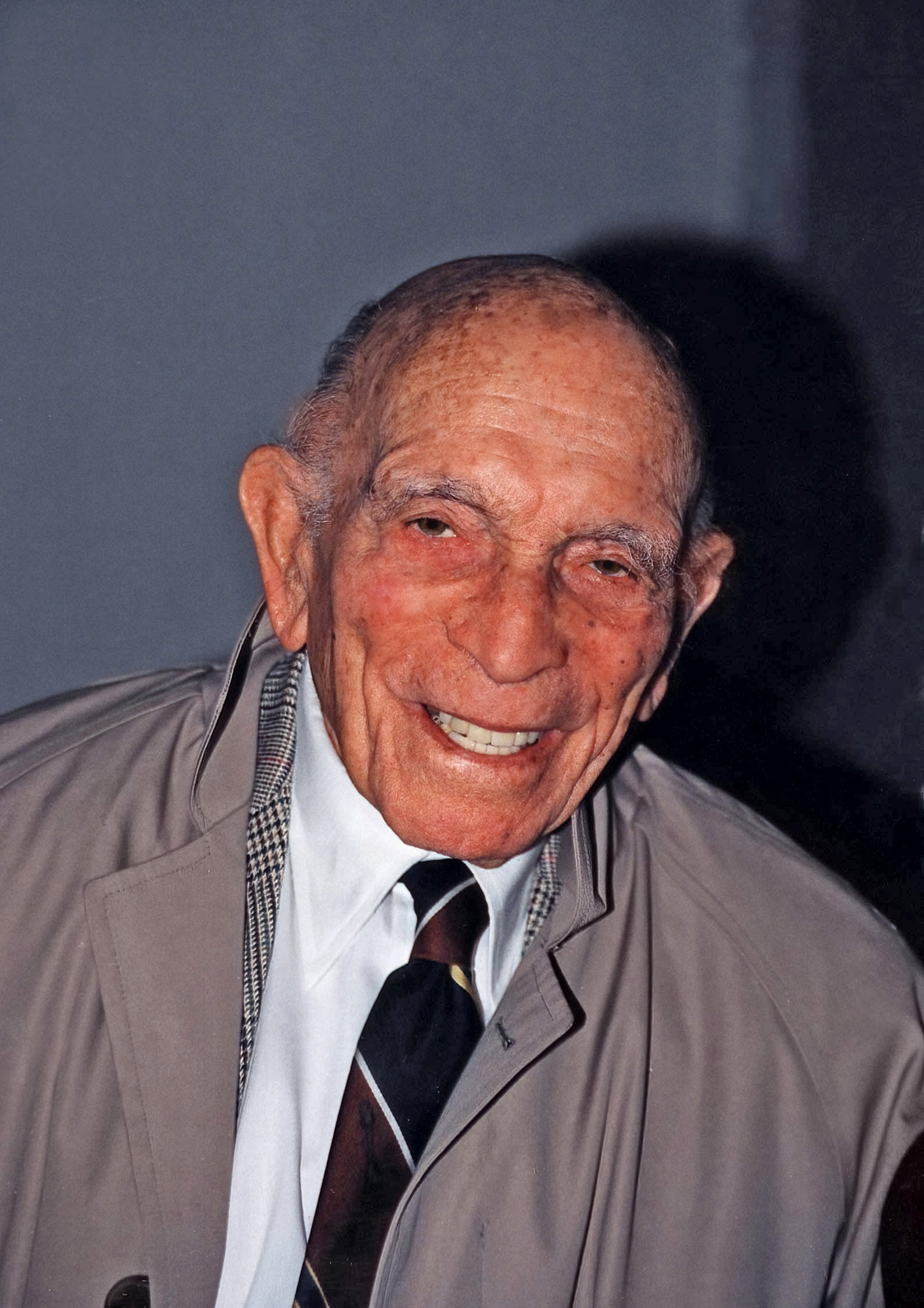
Julius J. Epstein, Best Screenplay co-winner

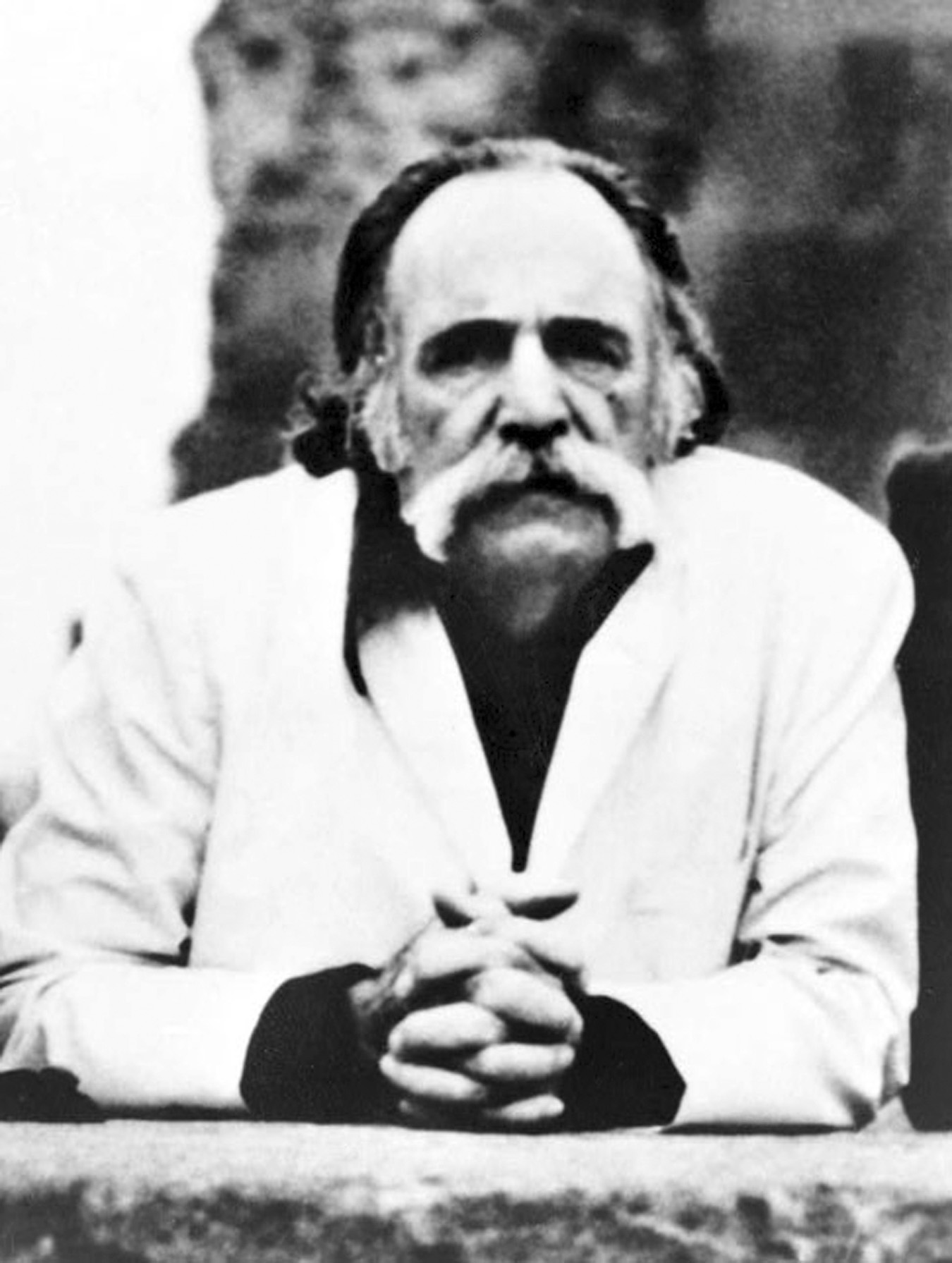
William Saroyan, Best Original Motion Picture Story winner

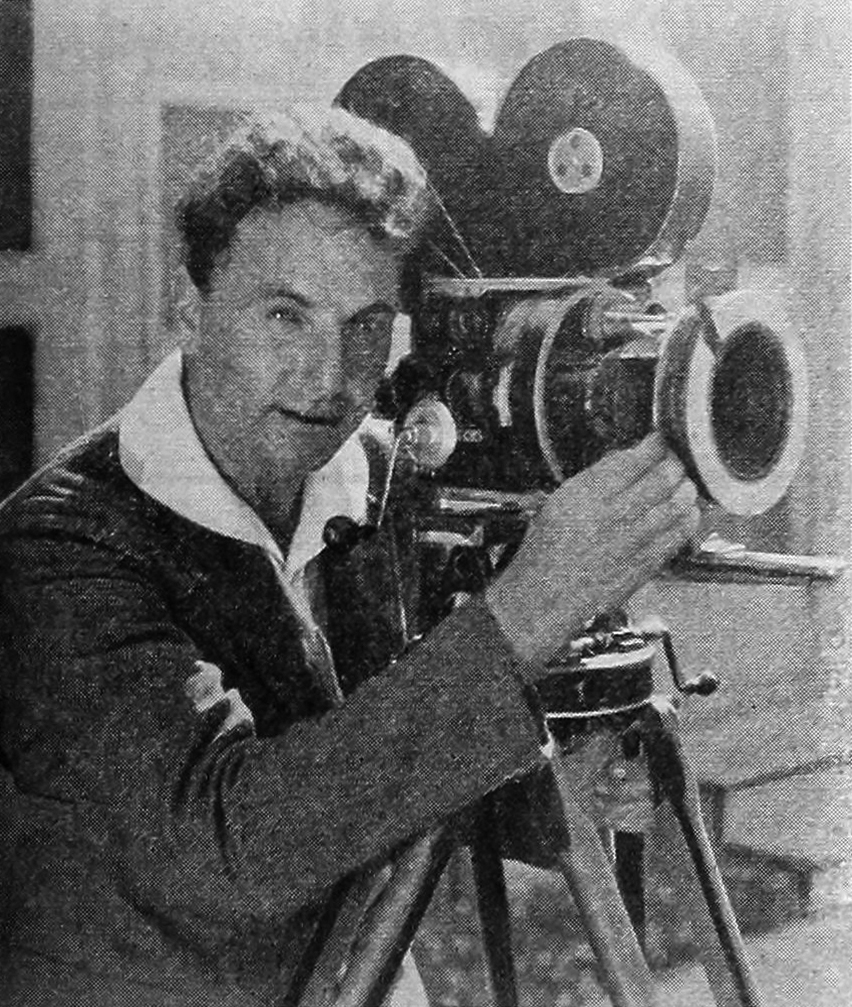
Hal Mohr, Best Cinematography, Color co-winner

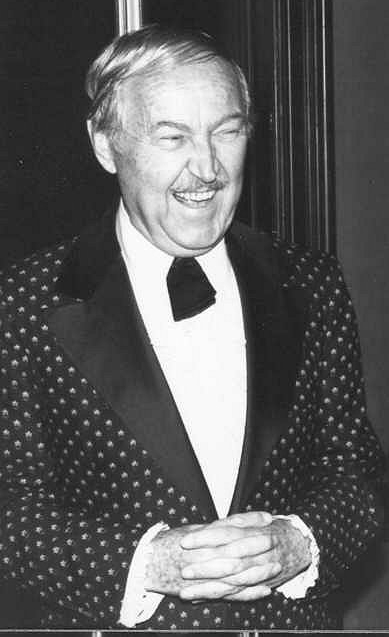
George Pal, Honorary Academy Award recipient

=== Awards ===
Nominees were announced on February 6, 1944. Winners are listed first and highlighted in boldface.

| **Outstanding Motion Picture**: **Casablanca – Hal B. Wallis for Warner Bros.**; For Whom the Bell Tolls – Sam Wood for Paramount; Heaven Can Wait – Ernst Lubitsch for 20th Century Fox; The Human Comedy – Clarence Brown for Metro-Goldwyn-Mayer; In Which We Serve – Noël Coward for Two Cities Films; Madame Curie – Sidney Franklin for Metro-Goldwyn-Mayer; The More the Merrier – George Stevens for Columbia; The Ox-Bow Incident – Lamar Trotti for 20th Century Fox; The Song of Bernadette – William Perlberg for 20th Century Fox; Watch on the Rhine – Hal B. Wallis for Warner Bros. | **Best Directing**: **Michael Curtiz – Casablanca**; Ernst Lubitsch – Heaven Can Wait; Clarence Brown – The Human Comedy; George Stevens – The More the Merrier; Henry King – The Song of Bernadette |
| **Best Actor**: **Paul Lukas – Watch on the Rhine as Kurt Muller**; Humphrey Bogart – Casablanca as Rick Blaine; Gary Cooper – For Whom the Bell Tolls as Robert Jordan; Walter Pidgeon – Madame Curie as Pierre Curie; Mickey Rooney – The Human Comedy as Homer Macauley | **Best Actress**: **Jennifer Jones – The Song of Bernadette as Bernadette Soubirous**; Jean Arthur – The More the Merrier as Constance Milligan; Ingrid Bergman – For Whom the Bell Tolls as María; Joan Fontaine – The Constant Nymph as Tessa Sanger; Greer Garson – Madame Curie as Marie Curie |
| **Best Actor in a Supporting Role**: **Charles Coburn – The More the Merrier as Benjamin Dingle**; Charles Bickford – The Song of Bernadette as Abbé Dominique Peyramale; J. Carrol Naish – Sahara as Giuseppe; Claude Rains – Casablanca as Captain Louis Renault; Akim Tamiroff – For Whom the Bell Tolls as Pablo | **Best Actress in a Supporting Role**: **Katina Paxinou – For Whom the Bell Tolls as Pilar**; Gladys Cooper – The Song of Bernadette as Marie Therese Vauzou; Paulette Goddard – So Proudly We Hail! as Lt. Joan O'Doul; Anne Revere – The Song of Bernadette as Louise Casterot Soubirous; Lucile Watson – Watch on the Rhine as Fanny Farrelly |
| **Best Writing (Original Motion Picture Story)**: **The Human Comedy – William Saroyan**; Action in the North Atlantic – Guy Gilpatric; Destination Tokyo – Steve Fisher; The More the Merrier – Robert Russell and Frank Ross; Shadow of a Doubt – Gordon McDonell | **Best Writing (Original Screenplay)**: **Princess O'Rourke – Norman Krasna**; Air Force – Dudley Nichols; In Which We Serve – Noël Coward; The North Star – Lillian Hellman; So Proudly We Hail! – Allan Scott |
| **Best Writing (Screenplay)**: **Casablanca – Julius J. Epstein, Philip G. Epstein, and Howard E. Koch, based on Everybody Comes to Rick's by Murray Burnett and Joan Alison**; Holy Matrimony – Nunnally Johnson, based on Buried Alive by Arnold Bennett; The More the Merrier – Richard Flournoy, Lewis R. Foster, Frank Ross, and Robert Russell, based on a story by Frank Ross and Robert Russell; The Song of Bernadette – George Seaton, based on the novel by Franz Werfel; Watch on the Rhine – Dashiell Hammett, based on the play by Lillian Hellman | **Best Documentary (Feature)**: **Desert Victory – British Ministry of Information**; Baptism of Fire – United States Army; The Battle of Russia – United States Department of War, Special Service Division; Report from the Aleutians – United States Army Pictorial Service; War Department Report – United States Office of Strategic Services, Field Photographic Bureau |
| **Best Documentary (Short Subject)**: **December 7th – John Ford and United States Navy**; Children of Mars – RKO Radio; Plan for Destruction – Metro-Goldwyn-Mayer; Swedes in America – United States Office of War Information, Overseas Motion Picture Bureau; To the People of the United States – Walter Wanger; Tomorrow We Fly – United States Navy Bureau of Aeronautics; Youth in Crisis – The March of Time | **Best Short Subject (One-Reel)**: **Amphibious Fighters – Grantland Rice**; Cavalcade of Dance – Gordon Hollingshead; Champions Carry On – Edmund Reek; Hollywood in Uniform – Ralph Staub; Seeing Hands – Pete Smith |
| **Best Short Subject (Two-Reel)**: **Heavenly Music – Jerry Bresler and Sam Coslow**; Letter to a Hero – Frederic Ullman Jr.; Mardi Gras – Walter MacEwen; Women at War – Gordon Hollingshead | **Best Short Subject (Cartoon)**: **The Yankee Doodle Mouse – Fred Quimby**; The 500 Hats of Bartholomew Cubbins – George Pal; The Dizzy Acrobat – Walter Lantz; Greetings, Bait! – Leon Schlesinger; Imagination – Dave Fleischer; Reason and Emotion – Walt Disney |
| **Best Music (Music Score of a Dramatic or Comedy Picture)**: **The Song of Bernadette – Alfred Newman**; The Amazing Mrs. Holliday – Hans J. Salter and Frank Skinner; Casablanca – Max Steiner; Commandos Strike at Dawn – Louis Gruenberg and Morris Stoloff; The Fallen Sparrow – C. Bakaleinikoff and Roy Webb; For Whom the Bell Tolls – Victor Young; Hangmen Also Die! – Hanns Eisler; Hi Diddle Diddle – Philip Boutelje; In Old Oklahoma – Walter Scharf; Johnny Come Lately – Leigh Harline; The Kansan – Gerard Carbonara; Lady of Burlesque – Arthur Lange; Madame Curie – Herbert Stothart; The Moon and Sixpence – Dimitri Tiomkin; The North Star – Aaron Copland; Victory Through Air Power – Edward H. Plumb, Paul J. Smith, and Oliver Wallace | **Best Music (Scoring of a Musical Picture)**: **This Is the Army – Ray Heindorf**; Coney Island – Alfred Newman; Hit Parade of 1943 – Walter Scharf; Phantom of the Opera – Edward Ward; Saludos Amigos – Edward H. Plumb, Paul J. Smith, and Charles Wolcott; The Sky's the Limit – Leigh Harline; Something to Shout About – Morris Stoloff; Stage Door Canteen – Frederic E. Rich; Star Spangled Rhythm – Robert Emmett Dolan; Thousands Cheer – Herbert Stothart |
| **Best Music (Song)**: **"You'll Never Know" from Hello, Frisco, Hello – Music by Harry Warren; Lyrics by Mack Gordon**; "A Change of Heart" from Hit Parade of 1943 – Music by Jule Styne; Lyrics by Harold Adamson; "Happiness is a Thing Called Joe" from Cabin in the Sky – Music by Harold Arlen; Lyrics by E. Y. Harburg; "My Shining Hour" from The Sky's the Limit – Music by Harold Arlen; Lyrics by Johnny Mercer; "Saludos Amigos" from Saludos Amigos – Music by Charles Wolcott; Lyrics by Ned Washington; "Say a Pray'r for the Boys Over There" from Hers to Hold – Music by Jimmy McHugh; Lyrics by Herb Magidson; "That Old Black Magic" from Star Spangled Rhythm – Music by Harold Arlen; Lyrics by Johnny Mercer; "They're Either Too Young or Too Old" from Thank Your Lucky Stars – Music by Arthur Schwartz; Lyrics by Frank Loesser; "We Mustn't Say Goodbye" from Stage Door Canteen – Music by James V. Monaco; Lyrics by Al Dubin; "You'd Be So Nice to Come Home To" from Something to Shout About – Music and Lyrics by Cole Porter | **Best Sound Recording**: **This Land Is Mine – Stephen Dunn**; Hangmen Also Die! – Jack Whitney; In Old Oklahoma – Daniel J. Bloomberg; Madame Curie – Douglas Shearer; The North Star – Thomas T. Moulton; Phantom of the Opera – Bernard B. Brown; Riding High – Loren L. Ryder; Sahara – John P. Livadary; Saludos Amigos – C. O. Slyfield; So This Is Washington – J. L. Fields; The Song of Bernadette – E. H. Hansen; This Is the Army – Nathan Levinson |
| **Best Art Direction (Black-and-White)**: **The Song of Bernadette – Art Direction: James Basevi and William S. Darling; Interior Decoration: Thomas Little**; Five Graves to Cairo – Art Direction: Hans Dreier and Ernst Fegté; Interior Decoration: Bertram Granger; Flight for Freedom – Art Direction: Albert S. D'Agostino and Carroll Clark; Interior Decoration: Darrell Silvera and Harley Miller; Madame Curie – Art Direction: Cedric Gibbons and Paul Groesse; Interior Decoration: Edwin B. Willis and Hugh Hunt; Mission to Moscow – Art Direction: Carl Jules Weyl; Interior Decoration: George James Hopkins; The North Star – Art Direction: Perry Ferguson; Interior Decoration: Howard Bristol | **Best Art Direction (Color)**: **Phantom of the Opera – Art Direction: Alexander Golitzen and John B. Goodman; Interior Decoration: Russell A. Gausman and Ira S. Webb**; For Whom the Bell Tolls – Art Direction: Hans Dreier and Haldane Douglas; Interior Decoration: Bertram Granger; The Gang's All Here – Art Direction: James Basevi and Joseph C. Wright; Interior Decoration: Thomas Little; This Is the Army – Art Direction: John Hughes and Lt. John Koenig; Interior Decoration: George James Hopkins; Thousands Cheer – Art Direction: Cedric Gibbons and Daniel B. Cathcart; Interior Decoration: Edwin B. Willis and Jacques Mersereau |
| **Best Cinematography (Black-and-White)**: **The Song of Bernadette – Arthur C. Miller**; Air Force – James Wong Howe, Elmer Dyer and Charles A. Marshall; Casablanca – Arthur Edeson; Corvette K-225 – Tony Gaudio; Five Graves to Cairo – John F. Seitz; The Human Comedy – Harry Stradling; Madame Curie – Joseph Ruttenberg; The North Star – James Wong Howe; Sahara – Rudolph Maté; So Proudly We Hail! – Charles Lang | **Best Cinematography (Color)**: **Phantom of the Opera – Hal Mohr and W. Howard Greene**; For Whom the Bell Tolls – Ray Rennahan; Heaven Can Wait – Edward Cronjager; Hello, Frisco, Hello – Charles G. Clarke and Allen Davey; Lassie Come Home – Leonard Smith; Thousands Cheer – George J. Folsey |
| **Best Film Editing**: **Air Force – George Amy**; Casablanca – Owen Marks; Five Graves to Cairo – Doane Harrison; For Whom the Bell Tolls – Sherman Todd and John F. Link Sr.; The Song of Bernadette – Barbara McLean | **Best Special Effects**: **Crash Dive – Photographic Effects: Fred Sersen; Sound Effects: Roger Heman**; Air Force – Photographic Effects: Hans F. Koenekamp and Rex Wimpy; Sound Effects: Nathan Levinson; Bombardier – Photographic Effects: Vernon L. Walker; Sound Effects James G. Stewart and Roy Granville; The North Star – Photographic Effects: Clarence Slifer and Ray Binger; Sound Effects: Thomas T. Moulton; So Proudly We Hail! – Photographic Effects: Farciot Edouart and Gordon Jennings; Sound Effects: George Dutton; Stand By for Action – Photographic Effects: A. Arnold Gillespie and Donald Jahraus; Sound Effects: Michael Steinore |

=== Special Award ===
- To George Pal for the development of novel methods and techniques in the production of short subjects known as Puppetoons.

=== Irving G. Thalberg Memorial Award ===
- Hal B. Wallis

== Presenters and performers ==
=== Presenters ===
- Donald Crisp (Presenter: Best Supporting Actor)
- Howard Estabrook (Presenter: Documentary Awards)
- Sidney Franklin (Presenter: Outstanding Motion Picture)
- Y. Frank Freeman (Presenter: Best Film Editing, Best Sound Recording, Best Special Effects and the Scientific & Technical Awards)
- Greer Garson (Presenter: Best Actress)
- James Hilton (Presenter: Writing Awards)
- Carole Landis (Presenter: Best Art Direction)
- George Murphy (Presenter: Best Actor)
- Rosalind Russell (Presenter: Best Cinematography)
- Mark Sandrich (Presenter: Best Director)
- Dinah Shore (Presenter: Music Awards)
- Walter Wanger (Presenter: Short Subject Awards and the Honorary Award)
- Teresa Wright (Presenter: Best Supporting Actress)
- Darryl F. Zanuck (Presenter: Irving G. Thalberg Memorial Award)

=== Performers ===
- Edgar Bergen & Charlie McCarthy
- Ray Bolger
- Susanna Foster
- Mitzi Gerber
- Lena Horne
- Betty Hutton
- Kay Kyser & His Band
- Red Skelton

== Multiple nominations and awards ==
Films with multiple nominations
| Nominations | Film |
|---|---|
| 12 | The Song of Bernadette |
| 9 | For Whom the Bell Tolls |
| 8 | Casablanca |
| 7 | Madame Curie |
| 6 | The More the Merrier |
| 6 | The North Star |
| 5 | The Human Comedy |
| 4 | Air Force |
| 4 | Phantom of the Opera |
| 4 | So Proudly We Hail! |
| 4 | Watch on the Rhine |
| 3 | Five Graves to Cairo |
| 3 | Heaven Can Wait |
| 3 | Sahara |
| 3 | Saludos Amigos |
| 3 | This Is the Army |
| 3 | Thousands Cheer |
| 2 | Hangmen Also Die! |
| 2 | Hello, Frisco, Hello |
| 2 | Hit Parade of 1943 |
| 2 | In Old Oklahoma |
| 2 | In Which We Serve |
| 2 | The Sky's the Limit |
| 2 | Something to Shout About |
| 2 | Stage Door Canteen |
| 2 | Star Spangled Rhythm |

Films with multiple awards
| Awards | Film |
|---|---|
| 4 | The Song of Bernadette |
| 3 | Casablanca |
| 2 | Phantom of the Opera |

== See also ==
- 1st Golden Globe Awards
- 1943 in film
