= December 7th (film) =

1943 film by Gregg Toland and John Ford

- Unreleased 82-minute version
- Directed by: Gregg Toland; John Ford
- Written by: Gregg Toland, John Ford, Samuel G. Engel, et al. (uncredited)
- Produced by: United States Navy
- Starring: Walter Huston; Dana Andrews; Harry Davenport
- Narrated by: Carleton Young
- Cinematography: Gregg Toland
- Edited by: Robert Parrish
- Music by: Alfred Newman
- Distributed by: Office of War Information
- Release date: 1943
- Running time: 32 minutes (censored version, which won an Academy Award in 1944); 82 minutes (original, unreleased version)
- Country: United States
- Language: English

December 7th is a 1943 propaganda documentary film produced by the US Navy and directed by Gregg Toland and John Ford, about the December 7, 1941 attack on Pearl Harbor, the event which sparked the Pacific War and American involvement in World War II. Toland was also the film's cinematographer and co-writer. The original version of this film, with a running time of 82 minutes, was not released but was retained by the National Archives. An edited version of 32 minutes length, which removed a long introductory segment and a shorter epilogue, was given limited release to specific audiences but won the Academy Award for Best Documentary (Short Subject) in 1944. This is the only film Toland ever worked on for which he received a director credit.

== Plot summaries ==
=== 32-minute version ===
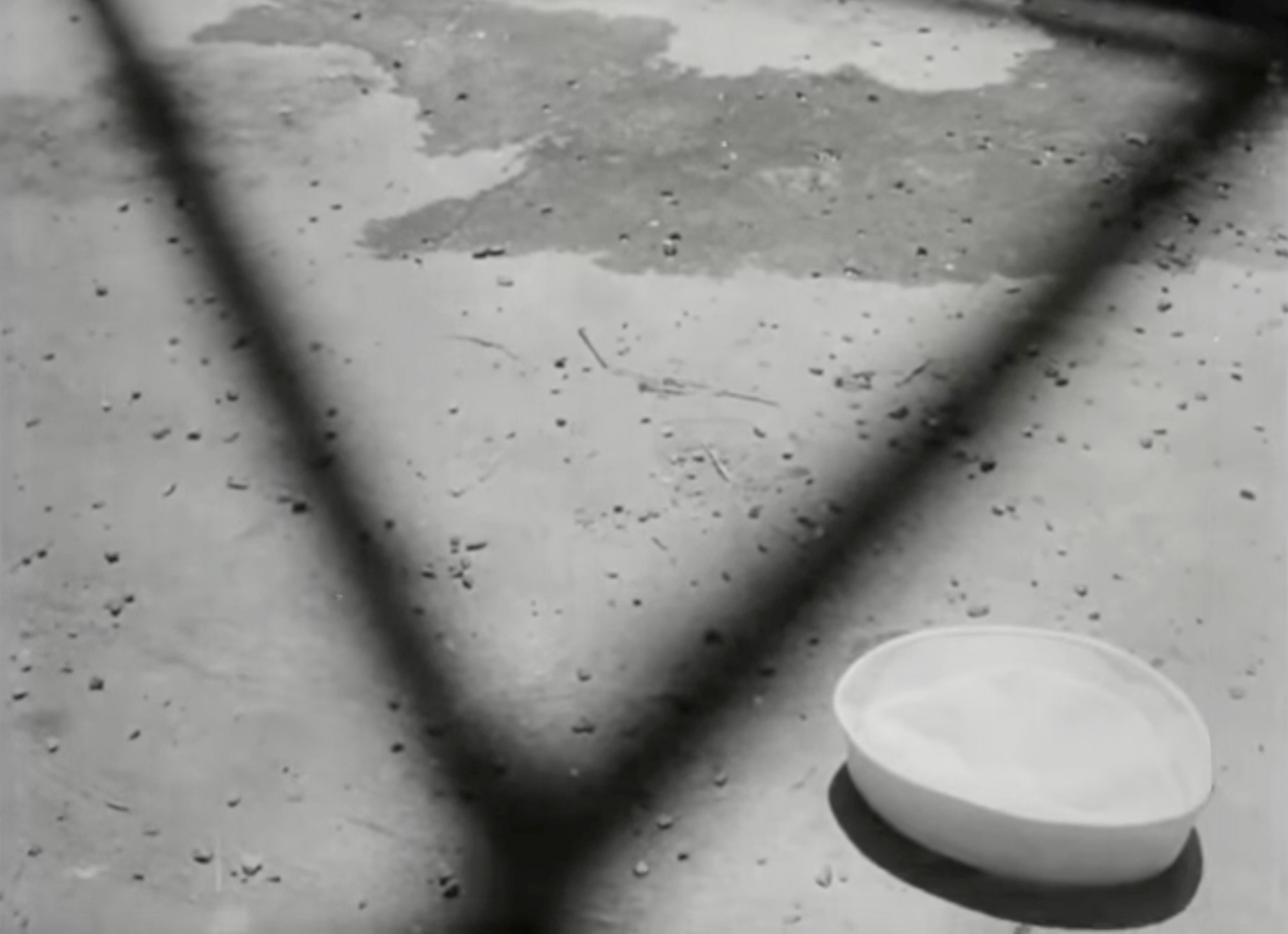
Scene from the opening of December 7th

Opening shots show the wreck of USS Arizona and a destroyed B17 bomber, followed by a shot of a damaged aircraft hangar. Two metal beams cast a V (for "Victory")-shaped shadow over what appears to be a large blood stain, as well as an American seaman's cap. These shots are followed by excerpts of memos from Secretary of War Henry Stimson and Secretary of the Navy Frank Knox, each endorsing the project of making a film about the attack. The "V" shadow is still superimposed over each memo.

The narrative begins with shots of Oahu while a narrator announces that it is "early Sunday [December 7, 1941] on the island of Oahu" where a figure of Uncle Sam is shown sleeping on a lounge chair in a Hawaiian house. The city of Honolulu is also described as "unsuspecting" and asleep. Soldiers and sailors are shown on guard against sabotage or domestic threats but not against invasion from abroad. Airplanes at Hickham Field and ships at Pearl Harbor are shown at rest, while other soldiers and sailors are shown at work, playing ball, and at a Sunday field mass. A Private Joseph Lockard, at the aircraft warning system, detects a fleet of airplanes approaching, but he is assured by an officer that they are probably American planes returning from a training mission. Shortly after, Japanese planes begin to fly over the island from different directions while in Washington, D.C. Japanese envoys discuss peace with Secretary of State Cordell Hull.

Recreated shots depict Japanese airplanes attacking, along with shots of buildings, ships, and personnel being destroyed, while servicemen return fire from guns and battleships. The attack ends by 9:45 a.m., described as "one hour and fifty minutes of perfidy." Emphasis is placed in the narration on the heroism of the American defenders and on Japanese losses, including the capture of two-man submarines. Tribute is also paid to the American lives lost. Several dead servicemen "announce" their names and home towns as a picture of each and shots of their families are shown. The dead represent a range of American geographic locations and ethnicities, but each is voiced by the same actor because "We are all alike. We are all Americans." A memorial service follows, accompanied by the song "My Country 'Tis of Thee." followed by a bugle playing "Taps."

The last ten minutes of this version focus on countering Japanese propaganda and displaying American preparations for reprisal and war. A map of Japan superimposed with depictions of several large radio transmitter towers accompanies what purports to be a victory broadcast by Japanese Prime Minister Tojo, spoken in English in a harsh, grossly stereotypical Japanese accent. The narrator gently rebuts Tojo's claims with "actual facts," such as how some ships that were supposedly destroyed are already being salvaged and repaired. The narrator also notes the influx of U.S. personnel and materiel from the mainland and how America's military buildup in immediately preceding years has enabled Hawaii to still claim to be "the greatest military and naval fortress in the world." Civil defense measures, starting with a proclamation of martial law on the islands by Territorial Governor Joseph Poindexter, are also displayed, although some parts of images are blacked out and marked "Censored." Children (the large majority of whom are of Asian or Pacific heritage) are shown participating in air raid drills and donning gas masks. The narrator explains that parents have cooperated because "this war is a war of survival, a people's war." Noting that the attack had served to "further complicate the already complex life of the Japanese in Hawaii," the narrator refers to images of Japanese merchants and others covering up Japanese-language signs or replacing them with patriotic names in English, while Japanese language schools and Shinto temples have been closed. The narrator ends by promising "Mr. Tojo" that "all they who take the sword shall perish by the sword."

=== 82-minute version ===
The short version of December 7th, as described above, was cut down by John Ford and film editor Robert Parrish from the longer film completed under Gregg Toland's direction. Toland's version included a long prologue, consisting of a staged argument between "Uncle Sam" (Walter Huston) and "Mr. C" (Harry Davenport), who refers to himself as Uncle Sam's "conscience." The middle portion, depicting the attack and its aftermath, is largely the same as in the shorter version, although a few shots have been cut. There is also a final epilogue in the longer version, depicting a conversation between the ghost of a U.S. Navy sailor (Dana Andrews) and the ghost of a dead soldier from World War I (Paul Hurst). This summary concentrates on the prologue and epilogue.

==== Prologue ====
After an opening with the same shots as in the shorter version—of damage from the Japanese attack and of the memos from Secretaries Stimson and Knox—the film begins with shots of the Hawaiian landscape. The day is marked as December 6, the day before the attack. We next see Uncle Sam ("U.S." played by Walter Huston) in a house on a hilltop in Honolulu, dictating a letter to a "Miss Kim" for a recipient named "Jonathan." Uncle Sam extols the physical beauty of this "heaven," claiming that he is going to take his shoes off and relax. He is interrupted, though, by the appearance of Mr. C (Henry Davenport). Miss Kim is dismissed, and two resume the friendly quarrels they've had since the writing of the U.S. Constitution. Mr. C claims that he has come to "go over the books" for the year 1941 since "there's some balancing to be done."

Mr. C asserts that U.S. has not been himself lately, but that Mr. C's own "still small voice" has been able to reach Uncle Sam in previous times of trouble. He suggests that they discuss "Hawaii," asking what U.S. knows about sugarcane and pineapples. Accompanied by montages of workers harvesting and processing these commodities, U.S. launches into extended discussion and praise of the importance of these crops to Hawaii and how they've allowed for the transformation of Honolulu into a modern city, with schools, museums, libraries, and houses of worship "representing all denominations." He especially singles out the "Big Five" sugar companies--"the backbone, the nerve center, the brain of the Territory . . . held together by blood ties and interlocking directorates."

Mr. C, though, points out that U.S. forgot to mention how the success of those crops depended on labor imported from abroad and especially from Japan. A montage of buildings and signs in Japanese, accompanied by increasingly dissonant and fast-paced music, illustrates the growth of the economic and cultural impact of these workers and their growing families. U.S. counters that of 157,000 Japanese Americans in Hawaii, some 120,000 are U.S. citizens and refers to a statement of loyalty to America by the head of the Oahu Citizens Committee for Civil Defense, Dr. Shunzo Sakamaki (portrayed onscreen by an actor), followed by shots of Japanese American school children reciting the Pledge of Allegiance and singing "God Bless America."

Mr. C, however, dismisses such patriotic spirit as "hyphenated," noting that many of these children also attend Japanese language schools, where they learn "Japanese loyalties, culture, and morals." A clip is shown of children in such a classroom speaking Japanese and singing the Japanese song "Hotaru no Hikari" (which is set to the tune of "Auld Lang Syne"). Mr. C invokes further suspicion of Japanese culture in reference to "their so-called religion, Shintoism" because of its veneration of ancestors and especially of Emperor Hirohito as a descendant of the gods. Mr. C further overrides Uncle Sam's invocation of freedom of religion. Although he claims not to "sort out who's loyal and disloyal," he goes on to note the number of parents who apply for their American-born children to receive dual citizenship with Japan.

On a different note, Mr C points to possible espionage being conducted by the Japanese Consulate in Hawaii, illustrated by staged scenes of the Japanese Consul receiving classified information, followed by a montage of Japanese Americans engaged in ordinary daily activities but implicitly gathering such information. The Consul is also visited by a German Nazi official as part of the Axis alliance, who remarks on how the Germans were able to "get" an American destroyer due to overheard information revealed in casual conversations in Honolulu. Mr C states that Washington is well-aware of such espionage but goes on to rebuke Uncle Sam for trying not to offend Japan and for not providing President Roosevelt and Secretaries Stimson and Knox "with good-sized clubs to back up their words with action." Mr. C warns U.S. that the Japanese will sometime "blow that bastion of liberty and military might behind which you sleep so easily into smithereens." Uncle Sam replies that "it can't happen here" because of the distance between Hawaii and Japan, but Mr. C claims that information is still being gathered, patiently and "bit by bit," to relay to the Japanese military, with shots of Japanese engaged in more overt espionage. Even shots of Japanese families listening to long-range radio broadcasts from Japan, however, are supposed to be evidence of an attitude of "Tokyo, I love you."

Uncle Sam once more dismisses Mr. C's concerns, pointing to the physical beauty of the islands and to the "people of many tongues and many lands living side-by-side." A montage follows of close-ups of Hawaiian women of identifying their different origins in various lands, including Japan, described by U.S. as "a melting pot . . . in which everything melts," followed by more shots appealing to the islands as a tourist destination. Mr. C replies, "It's amazing how much you can see, with your head buried in the sand" and leaves. Uncle Sam settles down to sleep but has uneasy dreams in a mixed montage of some previously seen shots with images of war, Hirohito, Hitler, and Mussolini. The second section, depicting the December 7 attack itself follows, largely the same as in the short, Oscar-winning version of the documentary.

==== Epilogue ====
The third and final section of the complete version is the shortest. Following the narrator's promise that "all they who take the sword shall perish by the sword," an American sailor (Dana Andrews) appears, stating "So that's the story of Pearl Harbor . . . It's all true because I know, I was there." The dead sailor turns to walk through a military cemetery and is joined by the ghost of an American soldier (Paul Hurst) killed in World War I. They note how other soldiers from other American conflicts are buried in the cemetery. The sailor holds out hope for a future without war after this one is over, while the soldier remains skeptical. The film concludes with a narrator naming countries in the Allied powers as the camera tracks across their various flags, ending with an airplane writing a giant V against the sky.

== Cast ==
- Walter Huston as Uncle Sam (addressed as 'U.S.')
- Harry Davenport as Mr. 'C', Uncle Sam's conscience
- Dana Andrews as Ghost of US Sailor Killed at Pearl Harbor
- Paul Hurst as World War I Ghost Soldier

== Development and censorship ==
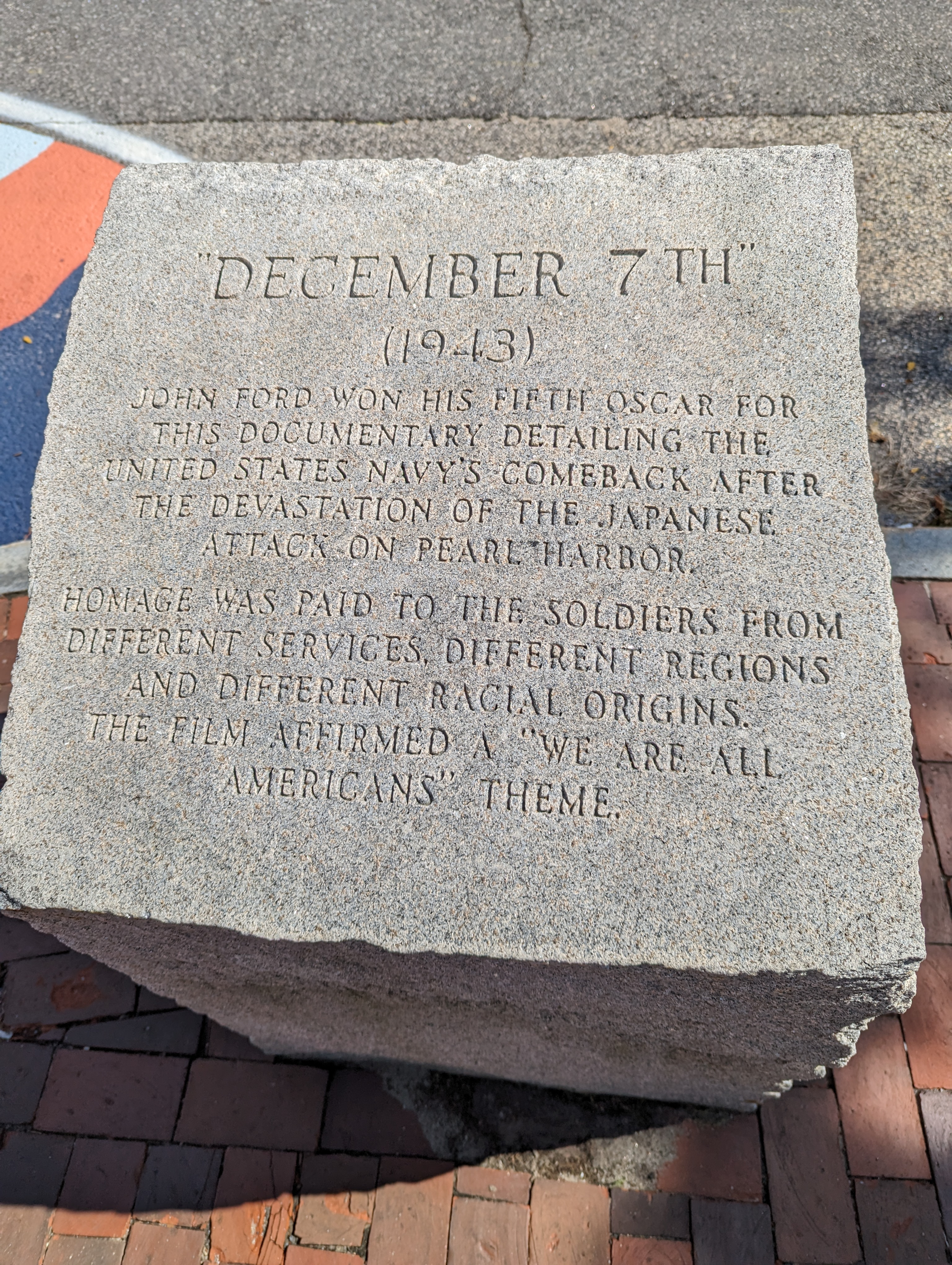
Stone inscription for December 7th at Ford's statue in Portland, Maine.

John Ford had been an established director in Hollywood for years, when in 1934 he was commissioned as an officer in the U.S. Naval Reserve. By 1939 he had established the Navy's Field Photographic Branch, which would eventually become a unit under the control of the Office of Coordinator of Information (OCI). In 1942, that office would become the Office of Strategic Services (OSS), the forerunner of the Central Intelligence Agency (CIA), under the command of William J. ("Wild Bill") Donovan. By the autumn of 1941, Ford had recruited other talent from the motion picture industry to work in his unit, including cinematographer Gregg Toland and editor Robert Parrish.

in early 1942, with the U.S. now actively engaged in World War II, both Secretary of War Stimson and Secretary of the Navy Knox had called for a film about the attack on Pearl Harbor and its immediate aftermath, each suggesting a three-part structure dealing with conditions in Hawaii before the attack, depictions of the attack itself, and the resulting American response. By February 1942, about two months after the attack on Pearl Harbor and the Hawaiian airfields, Ford and Toland had started filming scenes of salvage, repair, rebuilding, and the fortification of Oahu and Honolulu. Called away to film other military operations, in particular the Doolittle Raid on Tokyo and the Battle of Midway, Ford left Toland in charge of the project that would become December 7th. Before leaving, Ford had already worked on drafts of a script with writers Laurence Stallings and Frank Wead, as well as apparently the Private Lovett who had first detected unidentified aircraft approaching island on December 7. In Ford's absence, Toland and his crew took the project in somewhat different directions from those proposed by Stimson and Knox.

Because of the surprise nature of the Japanese attack, there was not a great deal of actual documentary footage that could be used for the film project. Toland and his crew returned to Twentieth Century Fox studios in Hollywood in July 1942 and continued to shoot additional scenes and edit the film until February 1943. Most of the depiction of the attack itself relied on footage shot after the fact in Hawaii or, especially, recreated on the studio lot with the use of miniatures and other special effects. By October 1942, Toland had been rewriting the script along with screenwriter Samuel Engel and shooting the prologue scenes with Walter Huston and Henry Davenport. During this time, Ford had already completed his own documentary short The Battle of Midway, which would go on to win its own Academy Award for Documentary Short Subject at the 1943 awards ceremony. Film scholar Lea Jacobs argues that the structure of Ford's documentary influenced segments of Toland's film.

In October 1942, despite objections from Donovan and others, Navy Undersecretary James Forrestall invited Lowell Mellett, head of the Bureau of Motion Pictures in the Office of War Information (OWI) to review an early rough cut of December 7th. Mellett recommended against release of the film, arguing that such an important factual event should not be presented as what was largely a work of fiction. Toland, however, continued to film scenes staged at the studio lot, augmented by special effects work. The film was completed by February 1943, when it underwent a second round of review in Washington, with Ford present. The military officers reviewing the film and Navy Secretary Knox all recommended substantial cuts to the film, based on the film's length, the "philosophical" nature of the prologue and epilogue, and some factual inaccuracies.

Ford and Toland began revising the completed film in March 1943. In consultation with screenwriter James McGuinness and editor Robert Parrish, Toland and Ford eliminated the fictional prologue and epilogue and made some adjustments to the depiction of the attack and its immediate aftermath, resulting by May in the 32 minute version. Even so, Mellett and others continued to object to wide release of the film. By June, though, Ford and Donovan arranged for this version to be viewed by selected military and civilian workers with security clearance. A bit later, Ford was able to obtain permission for a special viewing of the film by members of the Motion Picture Academy in order to make it eligible for an Oscar nomination like the one given to The Battle of Midway. The original 82 minute version was placed with the National Archives, and it was finally released some fifty years after the Japanese attack.

== Awards ==
The short version of December 7 received an Oscar at the 16th Academy Awards in 1944 for Best Documentary Short Subject. The other nominated documentaries were: Children of Mars, Plan for Destruction, Swedes in America, To the People of the United States, Tomorrow We Fly, and Youth in Crisis.

== See also ==
- List of Allied propaganda films of World War II
