= Undercover (OSS training film) =

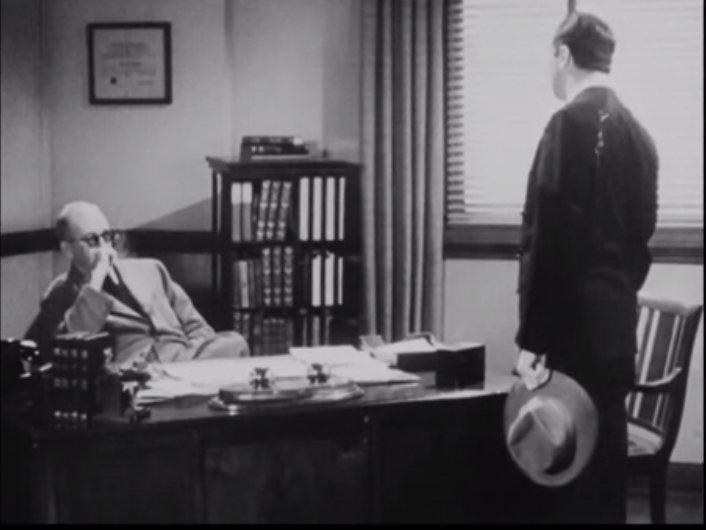
- OSS officer "Baldwin" (John Ford) meets overconfident trainee "Charlie"
- Directed by: John Ford (uncredited)
- Edited by: Robert Parrish (uncredited)
- Distributed by: Field Photographic Unit, Office of Strategic Services
- Release date: 1943
- Running time: 61 minutes
- Country: United States
- Language: English

Undercover, also known as Undercover: How to Operate Behind Enemy Lines and How to Operate Behind Enemy Lines, is a 1943 Office of Strategic Services training film, directed by and featuring John Ford. It was edited by Ford's longtime collaborator Robert Parrish.

Undercover was Ford's only sound film acting role, and was the first film ever produced by an intelligence service to train its agents. The film, which is in the public domain, is now widely available online since it was declassified after the war, and it often goes unmentioned in Ford filmographies.

== Background ==
Ford was commissioned a lieutenant commander in the U.S. Naval Reserves in 1934, and in 1940 he began bringing together thirty other experienced filmmakers in a Naval Reserve unit. He reported for active duty in September 1941.

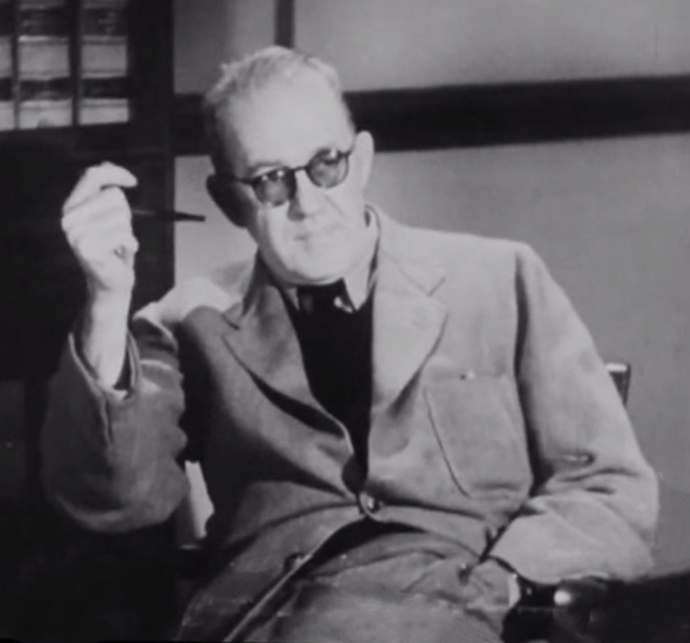
John Ford in Undercover

Although he remained officially assigned to the Navy, in October 1941, Ford's unit became part of the Office of Coordinator of Information, the OSS's predecessor. After the OSS was established in 1942, the unit became the OSS Field Photographic Branch. (The OSS was dismantled after the war and was succeeded by the Central Intelligence Agency.)

Ford initially was assigned to make documentary films for release to the public. Among them were The Battle of Midway, and December 7th: The Movie, both of which won the Academy Award for Best Documentary Feature. The two films, like Undercover, were edited by Robert Parrish, who had worked with Ford on Young Mr. Lincoln (1939), The Grapes of Wrath (1940) and other films. The Field Photographic Branch was later tasked with documenting OSS wartime activities and producing training films for its personnel. Hundreds of OSS training films were produced, and were an integral part of the curriculum for agents before being sent into the field.

Ford's OSS training films instructed OSS agents in equipment and techniques they would be using in the field. Among them were Training Group (1942) and The Mole (1943), both of which, like Undercover, were declassified after the war and are in the public domain.

== The film ==
Undercover: How to Operate Behind Enemy Lines

Undercover is a docudrama that dramatizes the experiences of OSS agents to teach them the right and wrong way of comporting themselves in the field. It is structured as a film within a film.

Introduced by Colonel Henson L. Robinson, chief of the OSS Division of Schools and Training, it begins by giving examples of agents discovered because of carelessness, and goes on to describe proper agent attitude, the importance of study, and methods of infiltrating enemy territory.

Most of the film tells the story of two recruits, one of whom is an overconfident agent known as "Student Charlie" and the other is "Student Al", a studious, careful agent. Germany is the obvious target of their activities but is not mentioned by name, with locales referred to as "Enemytown" and "The Capital". While Al carefully prepares, Charlie does not. As a result, Al winds up smoothly adapting to his assignment while Charlie gets into serious trouble.

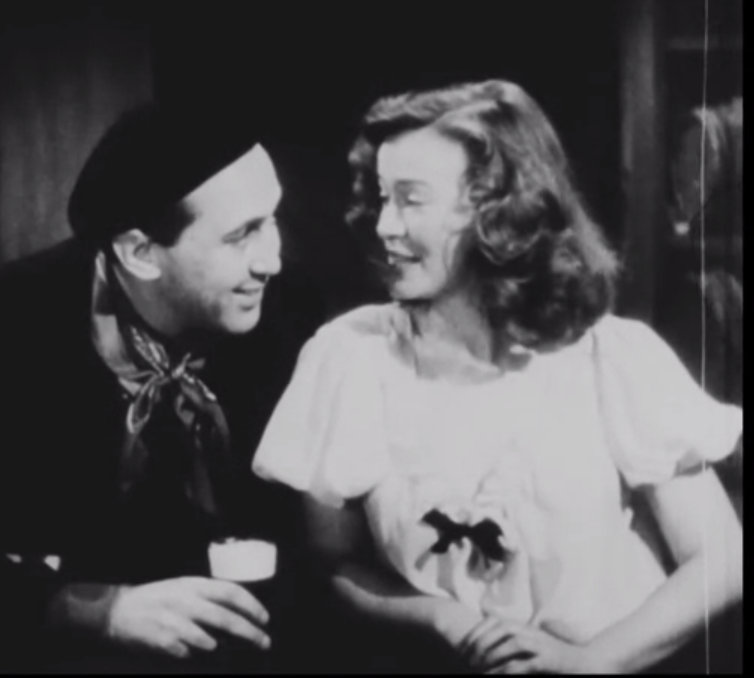
Agent Charlie unwisely flirts with a jealous sailor's girlfriend

None of the actors or crew members involved in the film received on-screen credit, and one Ford biography says that most of the roles were performed by "mediocre actors". One notable performer is Victor Varconi, a Hungarian actor and silent film star, who played a Gestapo interrogator. Ford is easily identifiable as "J.P. Baldwin, Attorney at Law", the civilian cover of an OSS officer, puffing on a pipe and with a large handkerchief in his breast pocket. In her book The Westerns and War Films of John Ford, author Sue Matheson says that "watching the film, it is difficult to determine where Ford the director and Ford the OSS man begin and end." His character stresses the importance of teamwork, which is important to film crews as well as OSS operatives.

Though produced for educational purposes, the film has creative touches not often seen in military training films, with attention paid to camera angles and movement. Scenes are crosscut to move the story along.

Vice Admiral John D. Bulkeley said in an interview after the war that Ford "went through the whole monkey business" portraying an OSS agent under civilian cover, and that "he loved to do that."

== Recent showings ==
The film has been shown on Turner Classic Movies and was made available on Netflix in 2017, and is available online as a public domain film at the Internet Archive and other sites.
