= 1943 Academy Awards =

1943 Academy Awards may refer to:

- 15th Academy Awards, the Academy Awards ceremony that took place in 1943
- 16th Academy Awards, the 1944 ceremony honoring the best in film for 1943
