= 1944 Academy Awards =

1944 Academy Awards may refer to:

- 16th Academy Awards, the Academy Awards ceremony that took place in 1944
- 17th Academy Awards, the 1945 ceremony honoring the best in film for 1944
