= Mississippi Blues (film) =

1983 film by Robert Parrish and Bertrand Tavernier

- Directed by: Bertrand Tavernier; Robert Parrish
- Produced by: William Ferris
- Cinematography: Pierre-William Glenn
- Edited by: Ariane Boeglin
- Release date: 1983
- Running time: 96 minutes
- Country: France

Mississippi Blues is a 1983 French documentary film directed by Bertrand Tavernier and Robert Parrish.

== Synopsis ==
The documentary explores the musical heritage of the American South, with a focus on black musicians. The film takes viewers to various locations, including William Faulkner's home, black churches, and sharecroppers' shacks, showcasing the region's boogie-woogie, gospel, and blues music. It features music and interviews including a man's instructions on finding, catching, and cooking possum. The film also examines themes of religion and African American political activity.

== Production ==
It was filmed in Oxford, Mississippi in 1982, after Tavernier concluded work on Coup de Torchon, an adaptation of Jim Thompson's 1964 novel Pop. 1280. Tavernier was inspired to examine the inspiration of the characters in the works.

=== Release ===
The film was screened at the Locarno Film Festival in 2003 and during the Cannes Classics section at the 2023 Cannes Film Festival.

== Reception ==
In a review for the Los Angeles Times, film critic Kevin Thomas praises the film for its "laid-back" and "astutely observed portrayal" of small-town life and for skillfully blending nostalgia with an unflinching look at poverty. He commends cinematographer Pierre-William Glenn's work and concluds that the film leaves viewers with a wry sense that the challenges of poverty and inequality will endure for generations.

Janet Maslin of The New York Times highlights that the film "contains an abundance of jubilant music" and vibrant local characters. She notes that the film's strength lies in its "sheer personality," with occasional insights from experts. She concludes that the documentary "manages to be both serious and quaint in equal measure" with "an easy spontaneity and good cheer."

== See also ==
- Judy Peiser, filmmaker whose work includes Mississippi Delta Blues, a 1974 documentary film
