= Yale vs. Harvard =

1927 film

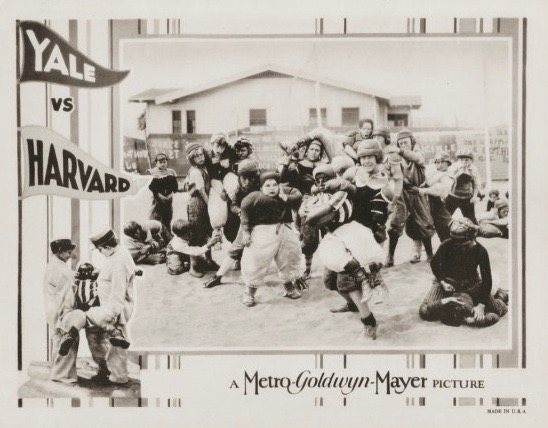
- Lobby card
- Directed by: Robert F. McGowan
- Written by: H. M. Walker
- Produced by: Hal Roach
- Cinematography: Art Lloyd
- Edited by: Richard C. Currier
- Distributed by: MGM
- Release date: September 24, 1927
- Running time: 20 minutes
- Country: United States
- Language: Silent with English intertitles

Yale vs. Harvard is a 1927 Our Gang short silent comedy film, the 64th in the series, directed by Robert F. McGowan. It is considered lost, as it was destroyed in the 1965 MGM vault fire.

== Cast ==
=== The Gang ===
- Joe Cobb as Joe
- Jackie Condon as Jackie
- Jean Darling as Jean
- Allen Hoskins as Farina
- Jannie Hoskins as Mango
- Bobby Hutchins as Wheezer
- Jay R. Smith as Jay
- Harry Spear as Harry
- Johnny Aber as Our Gang member
- Paul Toien as Our Gang member
- Pete the Pup as himself

=== Additional cast ===
- Godfrey "Duffy" Craig as Rival Gang member
- Robert Parrish as Rival Gang member
- Carl Busch as Undetermined role
- Robert Cruzon as Undetermined role
- Martha Sleeper as Undetermined role

== See also ==
- Our Gang filmography
