= That Justice Be Done =

1946 film directed by George Stevens

- Directed by: George Stevens
- Produced by: Ray Kellogg
- Narrated by: Irving Pichel
- Edited by: Robert Parrish
- Distributed by: Office of War Information
- Release date: 1945
- Running time: 10minutes
- Country: United States
- Language: English

That Justice Be Done (full film)

That Justice Be Done was a one-reel American propaganda film directed by George Stevens and made in 1945 by the Office of War Information for the US Chief of Counsel at Nuremberg and the War Crimes Office of the Judge Advocate General's Corps.

== Content ==
The film opens with a shot of the Jefferson Memorial and a voice over of Thomas Jefferson declaring his opposition to all forms of tyranny, then slowly fades to footage of Adolf Hitler making a speech soon dubbed into English "We have the right to do anything which benefits the German race, including complete expulsion of inferior peoples." The camera then moves to the crowds of people shouting "Sieg heil" and the soundtrack continues over pictures of war crimes.

The narrator describes how the various classes of war criminals, traitors, and people who committed specific acts are dealt with, then moves on to the major Nazi war criminals. The narrator states that we cannot torture or poison them like they did to their victims, but must uphold a higher standard of justice, exemplified by George Washington. The film states that 1945 must be the year of not only Germany's military defeat but also that of a trial and therefore a public exposure and repudiation of the ideas of Nazism itself.

== Cast ==
- William J. Donovan as Self(as Gen. William J. Donovan)
- Hans Frank as Self - Minister of Justice(as Dr. Hans Frank)
- Adolf Hitler as Self(archive footage)
- Robert Jackson as Self(archive footage)
- Vidkun Quisling as Self
- Jack H. Taylor as Self(as Lt. Jack H. Taylor)
- Harry S. Truman as Self(archive footage)
- John M. Weir as Self(as Brig. Gen. John M. Weir)

== See also ==
- List of Allied propaganda films of World War II
- The Nuremberg Trials - a 1947 Soviet propaganda film about the Nuremberg Trials
