= Madame Curie (film) =

1943 American film by Mervyn LeRoy

- Theatrical release poster
- Directed by: Mervyn LeRoy
- Written by: Aldous Huxley (uncredited); Paul Osborn; Hans Rameau; Walter Reisch
- Based on: Madame Curie; 1938 novel by Ève Curie
- Produced by: Sidney Franklin
- Starring: Greer Garson; Walter Pidgeon; Henry Travers
- Cinematography: Joseph Ruttenberg
- Edited by: Harold F. Kress
- Music by: Herbert Stothart; William Axt
- Production company: Metro-Goldwyn-Mayer
- Distributed by: Loew's Inc.
- Release date: December 15, 1943
- Running time: 124 minutes
- Country: United States
- Language: English
- Budget: $1,938,000
- Box office: $4,610,000

Madame Curie is a 1943 American biographical film made by Metro-Goldwyn-Mayer. The film was directed by Mervyn LeRoy and produced by Sidney Franklin from a screenplay by Paul Osborn, Paul H. Rameau, and Aldous Huxley (uncredited), adapted from the biography by Ève Curie. It stars Greer Garson, Walter Pidgeon, with supporting performances by Robert Walker, Henry Travers, and Albert Bassermann.

The film tells the story of Polish-French physicist Marie Curie in 1890s Paris as she begins to share a laboratory with her future husband Pierre Curie.

This was the third of eight onscreen pairings with Pidgeon and Garson.

In several versions, much of the scientific aspects of the film were cut or removed entirely. Turner Classic Movies has shown it unedited at 124 minutes.

== Plot ==
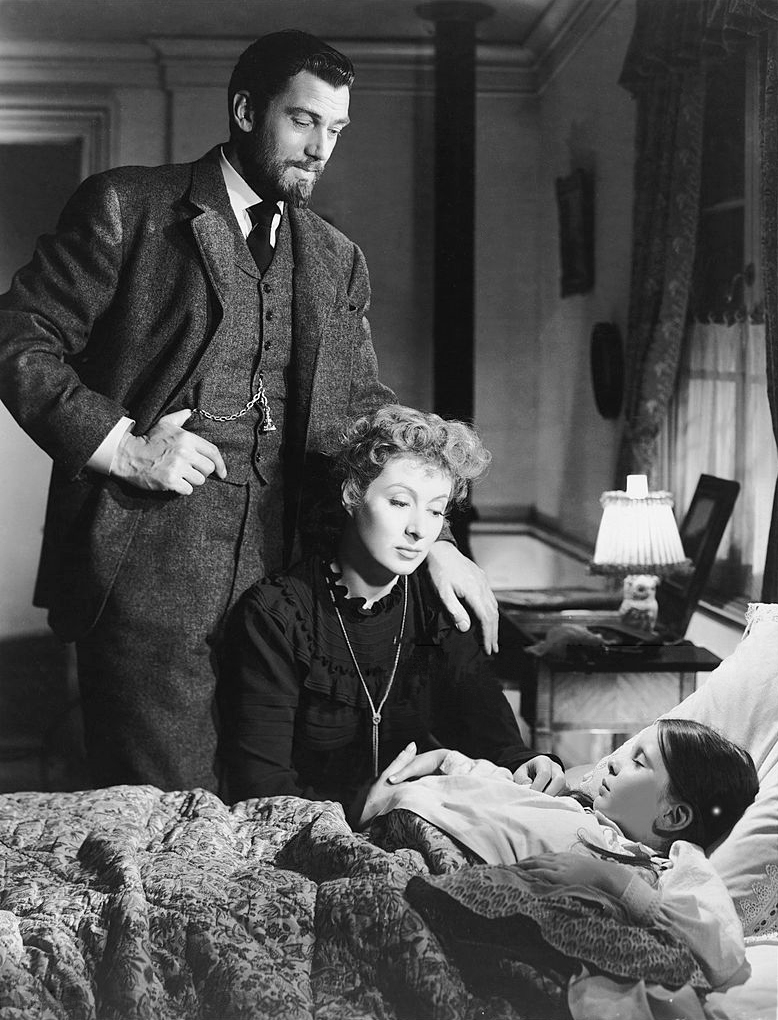
Walter Pidgeon, Greer Garson and Margaret O'Brien in Madame Curie

Marie Skłodowska is a poor, idealistic student living in Paris and studying at the Sorbonne. She neglects her health and one day faints during class. Her tutor, Prof. Perot is sympathetic and, finding that she has no friends or family in Paris, invites her to a soirée his wife is throwing for a "few friends" (primarily professors and their wives). Among the many guests is physicist Pierre Curie, an extremely shy and absentminded man completely devoted to his work. He allows Marie to share his lab and finds that she is a gifted scientist. Appalled that she plans on returning to Poland to teach after graduation rather than devoting her life to further study, he takes her to visit his family in their country home. Marie and Pierre both tend to concentrate on science to the extent that they don't realize until the last minute they have fallen in love. Even when Pierre asks Marie to be his wife, he does so in terms of reason, logic and chemistry.

Fascinated by a demonstration she saw as an undergraduate, of a pitchblende rock that seems to generate enough energy to take small photographs, Marie decides to make the rock's energy the subject of her doctoral study. The measurements she takes don't seem to add up, and she decides there must be a third radioactive element in the rock in addition to the two she knows are in it. In the midst of discussing this, she discloses offhandedly to Pierre's family that she is pregnant.

The physics department at the Sorbonne refuses to fund their research without more proof of the element's existence, but allows them to use a dilapidated old shed across the courtyard from the physics building. In spite of its disadvantages, they import eight tons of pitchblende ore and cook it down to look for the element they call radium. In spite of the inability to separate pure radium, they know something is definitely there, as Marie's hands are being burned. They hit on a tedious method of crystallization to isolate pure radium. After four years, they find only a stain on the bottom of the dish that should have held the radium. They return to the shed that night and find the dish glowing, confirming that they have isolated the radium.

Now world-famous, they go on vacation to rest after all the press conferences and the Nobel Prize. They're granted a new laboratory by the university; before its dedication, Marie shows off her new dress, inspiring Pierre to get her a set of earrings to go with it. Walking home in the rain, he absentmindedly crosses the street in front of a delivery wagon, and he is run down and killed. Marie almost loses her mind, but after the concerned Prof. Perot counsels her, she remembers Pierre's words that if one of them is gone, the other must go on working just the same. Finally, Marie gives a speech at the 25th anniversary celebration of the discovery of radium, expressing her belief that science is the path to a better world.

== Cast ==
- Greer Garson as Marie Curie
- Walter Pidgeon as Pierre Curie
- Henry Travers as Eugène Curie
- Albert Bassermann as Prof. Jean Perot
- Robert Walker as David Le Gros
- C. Aubrey Smith as Lord Kelvin
- Dame May Whitty as Madame Eugene Curie
- Victor Francen as President of University
- Elsa Bassermann as Madame Perot
- Reginald Owen as Dr. Becquerel
- Van Johnson as Reporter
- Margaret O'Brien as Irène Curie (at age 5)
- James Hilton as Narrator (voice)
- Lisa Golm as Lucille

== Production ==
Universal Studios quickly bought the rights to Ève Curie's book, with Irene Dunne in mind to play Marie. Dunne traveled to Europe and met with Ève Curie to discuss the project, but Universal sold the property to Metro-Goldwyn-Mayer a few years later. In March 1938, Anita Loos contacted Aldous Huxley, then recently moved to Hollywood, saying she would put him in touch with MGM for a writing contract. Madame Curie was originally set for production in 1941 starring Greta Garbo with George Cukor directing. MGM ultimately rejected Huxley's script for Madame Curie as "too literary," and after Garbo's success in Ninotchka, MGM wanted her to star in another romantic comedy. The project was shelved and Garbo left MGM for good in 1942.

MGM's star Joan Crawford was interested in the role Marie as she wanted to play serious characters, but her request was rejected by Mayer. The role went to Greer Garson, and Crawford cited it as a reason to leave MGM and sign to Warner Brothers.

Mervyn LeRoy replaced Albert Lewin, who was fired shortly before production began.

While the film is heavily fictionalized for dramatic purposes, the plot managed to adhere to the facts more than most biopics of the 1930s and 1940s. Madame Curie completely omits any mention of Marie's family in Paris, including her sister Bronisława, an obstetrician, with whom she was very close. There is also virtually no mention of Marie's intense devotion to politics and the liberation/independence of her native Poland.

Author James Hilton was the narrator for this film.

=== Critical response ===
Critic and writer James Agee writing in The Nation in 1944 states, "Madame Curie enlists an unusual amount of competence, patience, and commercialized sincerity in the production, which rather saddens than angers or pleases me, of the screen equivalent to Harpers' Prize "literature": safe, smooth, respectable, an epitome of all that the bourgeois likes what he calls art to be. One could use it as a model of all that is most to be regretted in Hollywood at this stage, and I thought I might." Leonard Maltin gave it three of four stars, "Despite stretches of plodding footage, bio of famed female scientist is generally excellent." Leslie Halliwell gave it one of four stars: "Dignified and rather dull biopic which well exemplifies MGM's best production style of the forties." Pauline Kael wrote: "Adapted from Eve Curie's biography of her mother, the movie is a product of simplification, distortion, and dullness of mind."

== Box office ==
According to MGM records the film earned $2,575,000 in the US and Canada and $2,035,000 elsewhere resulting in a profit of $1,086,000.

== Accolades ==
| Award | Category | Nominee(s) | Result | Ref. |
|---|---|---|---|---|
| Academy Awards | Outstanding Motion Picture | Sidney Franklin (for Metro-Goldwyn-Mayer) | Nominated | |
| Academy Awards | Best Actor | Walter Pidgeon | Nominated | |
| Academy Awards | Best Actress | Greer Garson | Nominated | |
| Academy Awards | Best Art Direction-Interior Decoration – Black-and-White | Cedric Gibbons, Paul Groesse, Edwin B. Willis and Hugh Hunt | Nominated | |
| Academy Awards | Best Cinematography – Black-and-White | Joseph Ruttenberg | Nominated | |
| Academy Awards | Best Scoring of a Dramatic or Comedy Picture | Herbert Stothart | Nominated | |
| Academy Awards | Best Sound Recording | Douglas Shearer (for Metro-Goldwyn-Mayer Studio Sound Department) | Nominated | |

Others

The film is recognized by American Film Institute in these lists:

- 2006: AFI's 100 Years...100 Cheers – #97

== In popular culture ==
Madame Curie was satirized in a 1976 episode of SCTV as Madame Blitzman (mistakenly shown on 'Monster Chiller Horror Theater') in which Frances Blitzman/Marie Curie (Andrea Martin) works alongside her husband Louis Blitzman/Pierre Curie (Eugene Levy) in creating a life-extension formula derived from radiation exposure. However, Louis suffers from painful recurring headaches which kill him eventually; at a meeting of the 'Academy of Science', an aged Frances reveals that Louis's experiments caused a plaque to grow in his brain, causing the painful headaches which killed him, and which are also affecting her.
