= The San Francisco Story =

1952 film by Robert Parrish

- Theatrical release poster
- Directed by: Robert Parrish
- Screenplay by: D.D. Beauchamp
- Based on: Vigilante; 1949 novel by Richard Summers
- Produced by: Howard Welsch
- Starring: Yvonne De Carlo; Joel McCrea
- Cinematography: John F. Seitz
- Edited by: Otto Ludwig
- Music by: Paul Dunlap; Emil Newman
- Production company: Fidelity Pictures
- Distributed by: Warner Bros. Pictures
- Release date: May 17, 1952
- Running time: 80 minutes
- Country: United States
- Language: English

The San Francisco Story is a 1952 American Western film directed by Robert Parrish and starring Joel McCrea and Yvonne De Carlo. The rough and tumble Barbary Coast of San Francisco is recreated with attention to detail, including Florence Bates as a saloon keeper Shanghaiing the unwary. Noir elements include many shadows, a discordant musical score, snappy dialogue, a disabused hero who resists the good fight, and a femme fatale. A schematic but insightful rendering of political corruption, the film is essentially about standing up to bullies.

== Plot ==
The law in San Francisco in 1856 is an ideal struggling to be established. Rick Nelson is a loner with his code of ethics, now a miner visiting his old stomping ground. He meets raven-haired beauty Adelaide McCall, who's in the buggy of corrupt political power broker Andrew Cain. Newspaper editor Jim "Captain" Martin begs his old friend Rick to rejoin his peace-keeping Vigilantes to put an end to Cain's reign of thuggery. Rick knows how easy it is to buy a judge, so he settles matters his way.

Adelaide, after failing to win Nelson over to their side, arranges to have him shanghaied to China "for his own protection". Nelson escapes from the ship and does not take kindly to this.

Martin eventually persuades Nelson to try to join Cain's outfit undercover. Cain demands a loyalty test; a jailbreak of one of his men. Nelson persuades Martin to allow the jailbreak. But as soon as both men are in the open, snipers open fire and kill the prisoner and wound Nelson.

Nelson orders Martin to print a story that he was killed to give him time to recover. Adelaide believes the story, burglarizes Cain's safe, and turns over incriminating documents to Martin. Martin has no choice but to hold her as a material witness.

When he recovers, Nelson takes the direct approach. He marches into a crowded political rally and challenges Cain to a duel. To save face, Cain must accept. The duel takes place on the beach, on horseback with shotguns. Nelson kills Cain, and Nelson's friend Shorty kills a hidden sniper. Since Martin is the new "law" in Frisco, it is up to him to decide Adelaide's future. He elects not to press charges.

== Cast ==
- Joel McCrea as Rick Nelson
- Yvonne De Carlo as Adelaide McCall
- Sidney Blackmer as Andrew Cain
- Richard Erdman as Shorty
- Florence Bates as Sadie
- Onslow Stevens as Capt. Jim Martin
- John Raven as Lessing
- O.Z. Whitehead as Alfey
- Ralph Dumke as Winfield Holbert
- Robert Foulk as Thompson
- Lane Chandler as Morton
- Tor Johnson as bartender at Sadie's (uncredited)

== Production ==
The film was based on the novel Vigilante by Richard Summers, an English professor from the University of Arizona. The novel was set in 1856 concerned the career of David C. Broderick and his fictitious mistress Hester Barton, and their involvement in the second vigilante movement.

Film rights were bought by Joel McCrea and Jacques Tourneur in early 1949, before the novel had even been published. McCrea announced he only wanted to produce, not star, and that Tourneur would direct. They hoped to set up the film at MGM and cast Ava Gardner. The novel was published in July 1949. The New York Times called it an "excellent short novel... a well-written, lusty yarn".

In March 1951 it was announced the film would be made by Fidelity Pictures starring McCrea and an "unknown" actress. Fidelity was a new company established in 1949 by producer Howard Welsch.

In July 1951 Fidelity announced the film would be one of six movies Fidelity would make for release through Warner Bros. Pictures. Yvonne de Carlo signed to co-star.

Jerome Chodorov was reported as working on the script in August. He is not credited on the final film.

Yvonne De Carlo signed to appear opposite McCrea in September 1951. She signed a two-picture deal with Fidelity and returned early from a tour she was making in Tel Aviv.

Fidelity announced the six films they would make for Warners would be budgeted between $600,000 and $700,000 and include The San Francisco Story, My Fine Feathered Friend with Dennis Morgan, Gardenia based on a story by Vera Caspary, Lela Cade, The Gentleman from Chicago by Horace McCoy, Reluctant Bride by Frederick Stephani and The Scarlet Flame, a story about Brazil's battle for independence by Emilio Tovar, to star De Carlo. Most of these films were not made.

Filming took place in late 1951. During filming, Will Jacoby, husband of cast member Florence Bates died. Bates was offered time off but she elected to continue to work.
