= The Nuremberg Trials (film) =

- Opening screen
- Directed by: Elizaveta Svilova
- Written by: Boris Gorbatov
- Produced by: Roman Karmen
- Cinematography: Roman Karmen; Boris Makaseyev; S. Semionov; V. Shtatland
- Edited by: A. Vinogradov
- Music by: A. Grana
- Distributed by: Artkino Pictures
- Release date: 24 May 1947 (U.S.)
- Running time: 58 minutes
- Country: Soviet Union
- Language: English

The Nuremberg Trials is a 1947 English-language Soviet documentary film about the trials of individual members of the former Nazi leadership after World War II. It was directed by Elizaveta Svilova, produced by Roman Karmen, and was an English-language version of the Russian-language film Суд народов ("Judgment of the Peoples" or "Judgment of the Nations").

== Content ==
Most of the film describes the Nazis' crimes in detail, particularly those committed in the Soviet Union. It claims that if not stopped, the Nazis would have "turned the whole world into a Majdanek". It also includes some elements of anti-capitalist propaganda, claiming that the real rulers of Germany were "armament kings" such as Gustav Krupp von Bohlen und Halbach. Of the Holocaust and the recovery of gold from its victims, the film accurately notes that the Nazis "even made death into a commercial enterprise."

It is noted in the film that the Soviet Union objected to the acquittal of Hans Fritzsche, Franz von Papen and Hjalmar Schacht, and to the fact that Rudolf Hess was given a sentence of life imprisonment, rather than a death sentence. The film shows the corpses of the executed Nazis, before ending with the words "Let the Nuremberg Trial be a stern warning to all warmongers. Let it serve the cause of world-wide peace – of an enduring and democratic peace" spoken while displayed on-screen.

== Depiction of the Auschwitz concentration camp ==
The film does not refer to the Auschwitz concentration camp by the German name by which it is usually known in the English-speaking world, but instead, referred to "the martyrs of Majdanek and Osventsim", using the original Polish name Oświęcim/Oswiecim.

== See also ==
- That Justice Be Done, American propaganda film about the Nuremberg Trials
- Death Mills, American propaganda film about the Nazi atrocities
- Judgment at Nuremberg, American fictionalized film account of the Judges' Trial
- List of Allied propaganda films of World War II
- List of Holocaust films

== Popular Media ==
A snippet of the audio from the documentary is used for the intro of The Intense Humming Of Evil by the Manic Street Preachers on their album The Holy Bible.
