= Robert Parrish =

American film editor (1916–1995)

- Born: Robert Reese Parrish; January 4, 1916; Columbus, Georgia, U.S.
- Died: December 4, 1995 (aged 79); Southampton, New York, U.S.
- Occupations: Editor; director; actor
- Years active: 1927–1990
- Spouse: Kathleen Thompson
- Children: 2
- Family: Helen Parrish (sister)
- Awards: Academy Award for Film Editing (1947)

Robert Reese Parrish (January 4, 1916 – December 4, 1995) was an American film editor, director and actor. He won an Academy Award for Best Film Editing for his work on Body and Soul (1947).

== Life and career ==
Born in Columbus, Georgia, Parrish was the son of Coca-Cola salesman Gordon R. Parrish and actress Laura Virginia (née Reese) Parrish. In 1924 the Parrish family relocated to Hollywood, "about 400 yards from Paramount Studios", where Robert's mom was "a card-carrying movie mother". She helped all four of her children obtain movie work. Robert and his sisters Beverly and Helen became child actors in the late 1920s.

=== Child actor ===
Parrish made his film debut in the Our Gang short Olympic Games (1927). He then appeared in the classic Sunrise: A Song of Two Humans (1927); Yale vs. Harvard (1928), another Our Gang short; Mother Machree (1928) and Four Sons (1928) from John Ford; Speedy (1928) with Harold Lloyd; Riley the Cop (1928) for Ford; The Iron Mask (1929) with Douglas Fairbanks; The Divine Lady (1929); The Racketeer (1929); Anna Christie (1930) with Greta Garbo; the anti-war film All Quiet on the Western Front (1930); The Big Trail (1930) with John Wayne; Up the River (1930) for Ford; The Right to Love (1930) with Ruth Chatterton; and Charles Chaplin's City Lights (1931) (as one of the peashooting newsboys who torments Chaplin's "Little Tramp" character).

Parrish worked steadily through the 1930s, landing roles (most of them uncredited) in Scandal Sheet (1931); I Take This Woman (1931); Forbidden (1932) for Frank Capra; The Miracle Man (1932); Scandal for Sale (1932); This Day and Age (1932) for Cecil B. de Mille; Doctor Bull (1933), Judge Priest (1934), The Whole Town's Talking (1935), and The Informer (1935) for Ford; The Crusades (1935) for de Mille; Steamboat Round the Bend (1935) and The Prisoner of Shark Island (1936) for Ford; Shipmates Forever (1936); One in a Million (1936) and Thin Ice (1937) with Sonia Henie; History Is Made at Night (1937) for Frank Borzage; Thrill of a Lifetime (1938); Having Wonderful Time (1938); Mr. Doodle Kicks Off (1938); and Dramatic School (1938).

=== Editor ===
As a young actor, Parrish was encouraged by John Ford to work behind the scenes, and first gained experience as an editing apprentice on The Informer. Parrish was Ford's assistant editor for Mary of Scotland (1936), and obtained additional sound and editing jobs on Stagecoach (1939), Young Mr Lincoln (1939), Drums Along the Mohawk (1939), The Grapes of Wrath (1940), The Long Voyage Home (1940), and Tobacco Road (1941).

Both Ford and Parrish served in the U.S. Navy during World War II, and together they produced documentary and training films, including The Battle of Midway (1942), How to Operate Behind Enemy Lines (1943), German Industrial Manpower (1943), and December 7th: The Movie (1943). Parrish also edited George Stevens' That Justice Be Done (1945) and The Nazi Plan (1945).

After Parrish was discharged from the Navy, he co-edited with Francis Lyon the Robert Rossen-directed boxing drama Body and Soul (1947). Parrish and Lyon received an Academy Award for their work.

Parrish went on to edit A Double Life (1947) for George Cukor, No Minor Vices (1948) for Lewis Milestone, and Caught (1949) for Max Ophüls.

Parrish's second Academy Award nomination, shared with Al Clark, was for the political drama directed by Rossen, All the King's Men (1949). In the first versions done by Al Clark, the film was poorly received by preview audiences and studio executives. Parrish discovered that a "montage approach" was much more effective, with arbitrary cuts made a set time before and after each important action. The film became a box-office success and won the Academy Award for Best Picture.

Parrish also edited No Sad Songs for Me (1950) and A Woman of Distinction (1950), as well as the documentary film Of Men and Music (1951).

=== Director ===
Parrish made his directorial debut with the revenge drama Cry Danger (1951). He followed it with The Mob (1951); and The San Francisco Story (1952), with Joel McCrea.

Parrish replaced Phil Karlson on Assignment: Paris (1952) and did some uncredited work on The Lusty Men (1952). He directed My Pal Gus (1952) and Rough Shoot (1953).

The Purple Plain (1954) was nominated for the Award for Best British Film at the 8th British Academy Film Awards. Next, he directed Lucy Gallant (1955), Fire Down Below (1957), Saddle the Wind (1958), and The Wonderful Country (1959).

He directed an episode of the TV series Johnny Staccato, "The Poet's Touch", as well as three Twilight Zone episodes: "One for the Angels", "A Stop at Willoughby", and "The Mighty Casey".

Parrish returned to features with In the French Style (1963). He followed it with Up from the Beach (1965) and The Bobo (1967) with Peter Sellers. He directed some of Sellers' scenes in the James Bond parody Casino Royale (1967); he is credited among its five directors.

Parrish also directed Duffy (1968), Doppelgänger (1969), A Town Called Bastard (1971) and The Marseille Contract (1974).

=== Later years ===
In his final film work, Parrish co-directed and co-wrote (his only screenwriting credit) with Bertrand Tavernier the documentary Mississippi Blues (1983) and had a small acting role in the TV movie, Blue Bayou (1990).

In his later years, he devoted time to writing memoirs of his many decades in the movie industry. In 1995, film historian Kevin Brownlow wrote of Parrish's first memoir, Growing Up in Hollywood (1976):

His stories about these pictures were marvellous in themselves, and he often came at them sideways, so not only the punchline but the situation took you by surprise. We all entreated him to write them down and in 1976 he did so, producing one of the most enchanting – and hilarious – books about the picture business ever written.

Summing up Parrish's career, Allen Grant Richards commented, "Other than his excellent editing work and early directing, Parrish may be most remembered as storyteller from his two books of Hollywood memoirs." His second memoir, Hollywood Doesn't Live Here Anymore, was published in 1988.

Robert Parrish died on December 4, 1995, in Southampton, New York. He was 79.

== Selected filmography ==
=== Director ===
- Cry Danger (1951)
- The Mob (1951)
- The San Francisco Story (1952)
- Assignment – Paris! (1952)
- My Pal Gus (1952)
- Rough Shoot (1953)
- The Purple Plain (1954)
- Lucy Gallant (1955)
- Fire Down Below (1957)
- Saddle the Wind (1958)
- The Wonderful Country (1959)
- In the French Style (1963)
- Up from the Beach (1965)
- Casino Royale (1967)
- The Bobo (1967)
- Duffy (1968)
- Doppelgänger (1969)
- A Town Called Bastard (1971)
- The Marseille Contract (1974)
- Mississippi Blues (1983)

=== Editor ===
- The Battle of Midway (1942)
- How to Operate Behind Enemy Lines (1943)
- German Industrial Manpower (1943)
- December 7th (film) (1943)
- That Justice Be Done (1945)
- The Nazi Plan (1945)
- A Double Life (1947)
- Body and Soul (1947; with Francis D. Lyon)
- No Minor Vices (1948)
- All the King's Men (1949; with Al Clark)
- Caught (1949)
- No Sad Songs for Me (1950; with W. Lyon)
- Of Men and Music (1951)

== Autobiographies ==
- Growing Up in Hollywood. New York: Harcourt, Brace, Jovanovich. 1976. ISBN 0-586-04859-6. OCLC 1659633.
- Hollywood Doesn't Live Here Anymore. Boston: Little, Brown. 1988. ISBN 0-316-69255-7. OCLC 16901046.
