= Saddle the Wind =

1958 film

- Theatrical Film Poster
- Directed by: Robert Parrish
- Written by: Rod Serling
- Starring: Robert Taylor; John Cassavetes; Julie London; Donald Crisp
- Cinematography: George J. Folsey
- Edited by: John McSweeney, Jr.
- Music by: Elmer Bernstein
- Production company: Metro-Goldwyn-Mayer
- Distributed by: Metro-Goldwyn-Mayer
- Release date: March 5, 1958
- Running time: 84 minutes
- Country: United States
- Language: English
- Budget: $1,479,000
- Box office: $1,075,000

Saddle the Wind is a 1958 American Western film directed by Robert Parrish, written by Rod Serling, produced by Armand Deutsch, and starring Robert Taylor, Julie London and John Cassavetes. The picture was filmed in Metrocolor and CinemaScope. The title song was written by Jay Livingston and Ray Evans, and sung by Julie London.

== Plot ==
Retired gunslinger and former Confederate soldier Steve Sinclair is living as a rancher in a small western community. He collaborates with the main landowner Dennis Deneen, from whom he rents the ranch, to preserve communal stability.

His quiet life is disrupted by the appearance of his emotionally unstable younger brother Tony and Tony's beautiful girlfriend Joan. Tony has also brought back with him a new beautiful handmade six gun with a filed down trigger. He goes out into the yard to show off his quick draw skills with his other prize possession. The scene ends with Tony finally shooting an image of himself in a pool of water.

An old rival of Steve's, gunman Larry Venables, also arrives on the scene looking for Steve. Gun crazy Tony challenges Venables to draw on him. When a reluctant but belligerent Venables gets distracted Tony kills him. His success goes to his head and he gets drunk, ignoring Joan. Steve is mad about the shooting and tells his younger brother that Venable was one of the faster gunfighters he ever knew, and that he got lucky.

A new problem arises with the arrival of Clay Ellison, a farmer who plans to fence off a strip of land he inherited from his deceased father. The land is currently grazed by cattle and is part of the open range. Ellison has plans to grow wheat on the land and plans to put up barbed wire to keep the cattle off the property. Tony attempts to drive off Ellison, but Steve intervenes.

Ellison appeals to Deneen, who agrees to defend Ellison's legal rights to the land. However Tony murders Ellison when he attempts to buy provisions in town. Deneen breaks his ties with the Sinclairs. Steve intends to leave the ranch, but Tony tries to take over. Steve drives him off, but Tony confronts Deneen and attempts to kill him. Both are wounded in the gunfight. Deneen's men agree to let Steve find Tony if he puts on his guns which he has not worn in years. Tony has fled into the hills. When Steve finds him, Tony shoots himself echoing the earlier scene of shooting himself in the pool of water. Steve tells the wounded Deneen his brother is dead. Deneen persuades him to stay on at the ranch.

== Cast ==
- Robert Taylor as Steve Sinclair
- John Cassavetes as Tony Sinclair
- Julie London as Joan Blake
- Royal Dano as Clay Ellison
- Charles McGraw as Larry Venables
- Donald Crisp as Dennis Deneen
- Richard Erdman as Dallas Hanson
- Douglas Spencer as Hemp Scribner
- Ray Teal as Brick Larson
- Irene Tedrow as Mrs. Mary Ellison (uncredited)

== Production ==
The film was shot on location in the Rocky Mountains in Colorado.

== Release ==
The film opened in 36 cities in the Far-West-Denver exchange area on March 5, 1958.

=== Box office ===
According to MGM records, the film made $1,005,000 in the U.S. and Canada and $1,075,000 in other markets, resulting in a loss of $308,000.
