= The Marseille Contract =

- Directed by: Robert Parrish
- Written by: Judd Bernard
- Produced by: Judd Bernard
- Starring: Michael Caine; Anthony Quinn; James Mason; Maurice Ronet; Alexandra Stewart; Maureen Kerwin; Catherine Rouvel; Marcel Bozzuffi
- Cinematography: Douglas Slocombe
- Edited by: Willy Kemplen
- Music by: Roy Budd
- Production company: Kettledrum Films
- Distributed by: American International Pictures (North America); Columbia-Warner (Europe)
- Release date: 4 September 1974 (France)
- Running time: 89 minutes
- Countries: United Kingdom; France
- Language: English

The Marseille Contract (released in the US as The Destructors) is a 1974 British thriller film directed by Robert Parrish. Its stars are Michael Caine, Anthony Quinn and James Mason.

Set in France, the story concerns an American agent attempting to bring down a French drug baron by hiring an assassin who turns out to be an old friend.

== Plot ==
Steve Ventura, the French station head of Drug Enforcement Administration, is unable to find a way to expose and arrest a drug baron named Jacques Brizzard, whose henchmen were responsible for killing one of Ventura's undercover agents in Marseille. Given that Brizzard is politically well connected to numerous affiliations, the law enforcement is finding it difficult to prove that Brizzard is involved in various crimes including murder. After several failed efforts of trying to cover an angle on Brizzard, Ventura comes to the conclusion that he couldn't take down the crime lord by the book, especially after Brizzard's henchmen make an attempt on his life, which he barely survives by evading them.

Following the incident, Ventura approaches Inspector Briac of the French Police Prefecture in Paris about the pinnacle, who reluctantly leads him to contact a hitman to assassinate Brizzard. Meeting the hitman discreetly, Ventura recognizes an old friend in John Deray, much to the surprise of both men. Accepting the contract, Deray travels to Marseille under a false identity and scouts Brizzard's villa for ways to penetrate the property, spotting a possible approach by Brizzard's daughter, Lucienne, who enjoys the lavish life and privileges which her father provides, including fast sports cars. The next morning, Deray meets with Lucienne after impressing her during a car race between the two, with Lucienne in a Porsche 911S and Deray in an Alfa Romeo Montreal, and gets a dinner invite to the villa to meet her father which he attends.

Ventura, in the meantime, decides to cancel the contract and have Deray arrested under false charges after a change of heart, which exposes Deray as Brizzard runs a background check on him to which he admits to being a killer for hire, albeit unemployed at the time. Brizzard tests him by hiring him to kill an informant, and Deray does not hesitate. Brizzard eventually hires Deray as a full-time employee which he uses as a cover until he could find the right moment to take him out, and is assigned to be a courier at a change of hands. But, Deray barely makes it out of the scene alive at the rendezvous when the party he was supposed to meet at the change of hands turn out to be undercover policemen who attempt to arrest Deray over possession of illegal substance which was planted on him on the orders of Brizzard, immediately coming to the conclusion he was double crossed.

Successfully evading armed forces of both the police and Brizzard's killers, Deray meets with Ventura to brief him about the drugs shipping to Marseille from Turkey and Brizzard is the one buying them all which he had heard earlier when eavesdropping on the crime lord's telephone calls. Both men head to the meet where they discover that Inspector Briac was directly involved with Brizzard and was planning to betray and kill him in order to take all the drugs for himself and sell them to other buyers and frame Deray for it. A firefight ensues and all three parties shoot each other, except for Brizzard who drives away, and Ventura at whose feet Deray dies due to a fatal bullet wound. Outraged, Ventura heads to the political fundraiser Brizzard is hosting, discreetly shoots him without letting anyone notice and departs.

== Cast ==
- Michael Caine as John Deray
- Anthony Quinn as Steve Ventura
- James Mason as Jacques Brizzard
- Maurice Ronet as Inspector Briac
- Alexandra Stewart as Rita
- Maureen Kerwin as Lucienne Brizard
- Catherine Rouvel as Brizard's mistress
- Marcel Bozzuffi as Calmet
- Patrick Floersheim as Kovakian
- André Oumansky as Marsac
- Georges Beller as Minierini
- Jean-Louis Fortuit as Fortuit
- Jerry Brouer as Kurt
- Georges Lycan as Henri
- Pierre Koulak as Wilson
- Pierre Salinger as Williams
- Billy Kearns as Billy Kearns
- Hella Petri as The Countess
- Vernon Dobtcheff as Lazar
- Gib Grossac as Fournier
- Barbara Sommers as Sally
- Martine Kelly as Janet
- Dyanik Zurakowska as The Girl
- Jean Bouchaud as Rouget
- Bob Lerick as 1st Man at Airfield
- Jacques Chevalier as 2nd Man at Airfield
- Jack Jourdain as 3rd Man at Airfield
- Robert Rondo as Matthews
- John Rico as The Informer
- Charles Millot as The Butler
- Charles Marosi as The Coroner
- Brookes Poole as Kevin Matthews
- Dominique Gilles as The Helicopter Pilot
- Georges Pellegrin as Pellegrin
- Edward Marcus as Fargas
