= Letter to a Hero =

1943 film

- Produced by: Frederic Ullman Jr.
- Distributed by: RKO Pictures
- Release date: 1943
- Running time: 20 minutes
- Country: United States
- Language: English

Letter to a Hero is a 1943 American short documentary film produced by Frederic Ullman Jr. It was nominated for an Academy Award at the 16th Academy Awards for Best Short Subject (Two-Reel).
