= Plan for Destruction =

1943 film

- Directed by: Edward Cahn
- Written by: Karl Kamb; John C. Higgins
- Narrated by: Lewis Stone
- Cinematography: Jackson Rose
- Edited by: Harry Komer
- Music by: Nathaniel Shilkret
- Distributed by: MGM
- Release date: April 22, 1943
- Running time: 22 minutes
- Country: United States
- Language: English

Plan for Destruction is a 1943 American short propaganda film directed by Edward Cahn. It looks at the Geopolitik ideas of the ex-World War I professor, General Karl Haushofer, who is portrayed as the head of a huge organisation for gathering information of strategic value and the mastermind behind Adolf Hitler's wars and plans to enslave the world. The film was nominated for an Academy Award for Best Documentary Short.

== Cast ==
- Lewis Stone as himself - Commentator
- Frank Reicher as Karl Ernst Haushofer
- George Lynn as Rudolf Hess
