= Flight for Freedom =

1943 film

- Theatrical release poster
- Directed by: Lothar Mendes
- Written by: Jane Murfin; Oliver H. P. Garrett; S. K. Lauren
- Story by: Horace McCoy
- Produced by: David Hempstead
- Starring: Rosalind Russell; Fred MacMurray; Herbert Marshall
- Cinematography: Frank Redman; Lee Garmes
- Edited by: Roland Gross
- Music by: Roy Webb
- Distributed by: RKO
- Release date: April 2, 1943
- Running time: 102 minutes
- Country: United States
- Language: English
- Box office: $1.5 million (US rentals)

Flight for Freedom (also known as Stand By to Die) is a 1943 American drama film directed by Lothar Mendes and starring Rosalind Russell, Fred MacMurray and Herbert Marshall. Film historians and Earhart scholars consider Flight for Freedom a film à clef version of Amelia Earhart's life story, concentrating on the sensational aspects of her disappearance during her 1937 world flight. The film's ending speculated that the main character's disappearance was connected to a secret mission on behalf of the U.S. government. As a propaganda film, the Japanese characters in Flight for Freedom were portrayed as devious and evil.

== Plot ==
In the aviation establishment of the 1930s, well-known aviator Tonie Carter is fighting the prejudice against women pilots. One of her rivals, pilot Randy Britton, is attracted to her. After setting flight records flying for her former mentor, Paul Turner, Tonie embarks on a solo circumnavigation of the globe.

When her plans are made public, U.S. Navy Admiral Graves seeks to convince her to undertake a top-secret mission involving flying over Japanese-held territory in the Mandated Islands. Flying for the navy, Randy has discovered the Japanese-mandated islands have hidden military installations. When Tonie receives a classified message in Hawaii, she aborts her takeoff in order to meet Graves who asks her to turn her record-breaking flight into a spy mission.

Awaiting the repair of her aircraft, Tonie travels back to mainland United States accompanied by Paul Turner, who reveals he wants to marry her at the conclusion of the flight. Turner, however, is apprehensive about the dangers involved in her flight. One of the concerns is that Gull Island, a tiny island rendezvous in the Pacific is a daunting challenge for even the best navigator.

The U.S. Navy sends Randy Britton to join Tonie in New Guinea as her navigator. She finds out that the Japanese will be waiting for her on Gull Island. Not wanting to jeopardize Randy, her true love, Carter takes off early in the morning before he reaches the airport. She vanishes during the latter part of the world flight, triggering a massive search which proves fruitless.

== Cast ==
- Rosalind Russell as Tonie Carter
- Fred MacMurray as Randy Britton
- Herbert Marshall as Paul Turner
- Eduardo Ciannelli as Johnny Salvini
- Walter Kingsford as Admiral Graves
- Richard Loo as Mr. Yokohata (uncredited)
- Charles Lung as Flyer
- Bud McTaggart as Flyer
- Bruce Edwards as Flyer

== Production ==
A combination of live action and miniatures in Flight for Freedom was used to depict the final flight of Tonie Carter.

Flight for Freedom was produced by RKO, whose CEO, Floyd Odlum, was married to Jacqueline Cochran, one of Earhart's close friends and a renowned aviator in her own right. It was claimed to be based on a screenplay submitted by Amelia Earhart's husband, George P. Putnam. Rosalind Russell's characterization of the Earhart-like aviator shows Carter establishing a reputation as "the Lady Lindbergh" and setting numerous aviation records. Other characters are loosely drawn from real life, such as Earhart confidant and instructor Paul Mantz, as well as Fred Noonan, albeit in the role of pilot Randy Britton, played by Fred MacMurray, on loan from Paramount Pictures.

Principal photography, under the working title Stand By to Die, was completed from late-August to late-October 1942, with additional scenes shot in December, as the release was held back to coincide with the headline news surrounding the Battle of Midway. Newsreel footage was incorporated to show naval missions over the area that Tonie Carter was portrayed as having overflown.

== Reception ==
Flight for Freedom furthered a belief that Earhart was spying on the Japanese in the Pacific at the request of the Franklin Roosevelt administration. (Note: Some researchers have speculated that Earhart and Noonan were shot down by Japanese aircraft, as she was thought to be spying on Japanese territory so the United States would have a reason to search the South Seas Mandated Islands.) Bosley Crowther of The New York Times, in his contemporary review, echoed the popular notion that the film was based on the life of Amelia Earhart. His lukewarm review touched on the central theme as being provocative. His review noted: "As a movie, this 'Flight for Freedom' bumps along interminably before it lifts, mainly because it has trouble pulling out of a conventional rut. Mostly it is a routine story of one of those unsatisfactory romances, wherein a woman flier and a gentleman (also a flier) stay apart. He is a reckless, wolfish rascal; she is a steady, four-square type. While she is becoming famous he is becoming a bum. But then the Navy secretly invites her to join in a ruse upon the Japs. For one brief moment before oblivion she meekly acknowledges her love."

The Hollywood Reporter announced that the proceeds from the Hollywood premiere were given to war charities. Rosalind Russell later reprised her role in a Lux Radio Theatre broadcast on September 20, 1943, co-starring George Brent as Randy Britton.

== Awards ==
Albert S. D'Agostino, Carroll Clark, Darrell Silvera and Harley Miller were nominated for the Academy Award for Best Art Direction (Black-and-White).
