= Harley Miller =

American set decorator

- Occupation: Set decorator
- Years active: 1942-1957

Harley Miller was an American set decorator. He was nominated an Academy Award in the category Best Art Direction for the film Flight for Freedom.

== Selected filmography ==
- Flight for Freedom (1943)
