= Hugh Hunt =

American set decorator

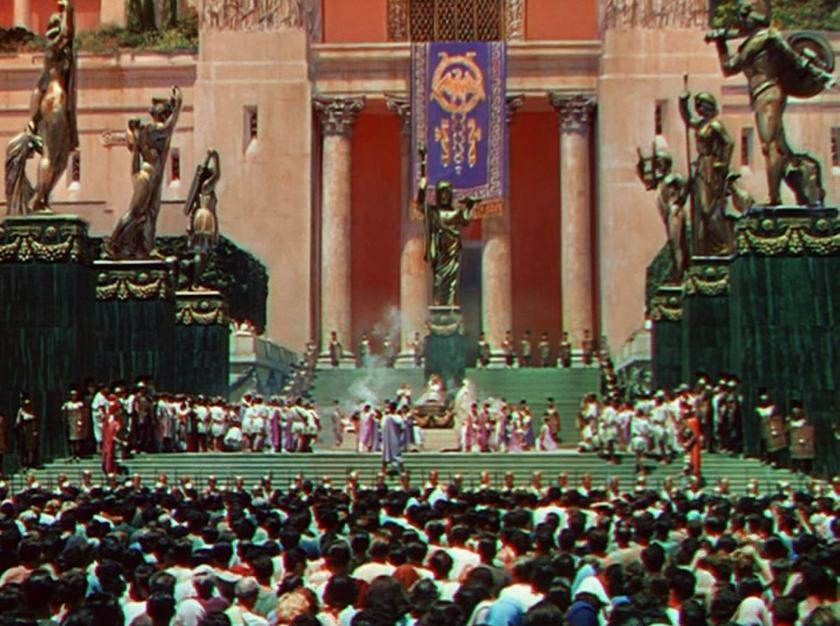
- Born: March 8, 1902; Memphis, Tennessee, USA
- Died: September 1, 1988 (aged 86)
- Occupation: Set decorator
- Years active: 1935–1970

Hugh Hunt (March 8, 1902 – September 1, 1988) was an American set decorator. He won two Academy Awards and was nominated for eleven more in the category Best Art Direction.

== Selected filmography ==
Hunt won two Academy Awards for Best Art Direction and was nominated for eleven more:

Won

- Ben-Hur (1959)
- Julius Caesar (1953)

Nominated

- Mister Buddwing (1966)
- The Unsinkable Molly Brown (1964)
- Twilight of Honor (1963)
- Mutiny on the Bounty (1962)
- Cimarron (1960)
- Raintree County (1957)
- I'll Cry Tomorrow (1955)
- Quo Vadis (1951)
- The Red Danube (1949)
- The Picture of Dorian Gray (1945)
- Madame Curie (1943)
