= The Battle of Midway (film) =

1942 documentary film by John Ford

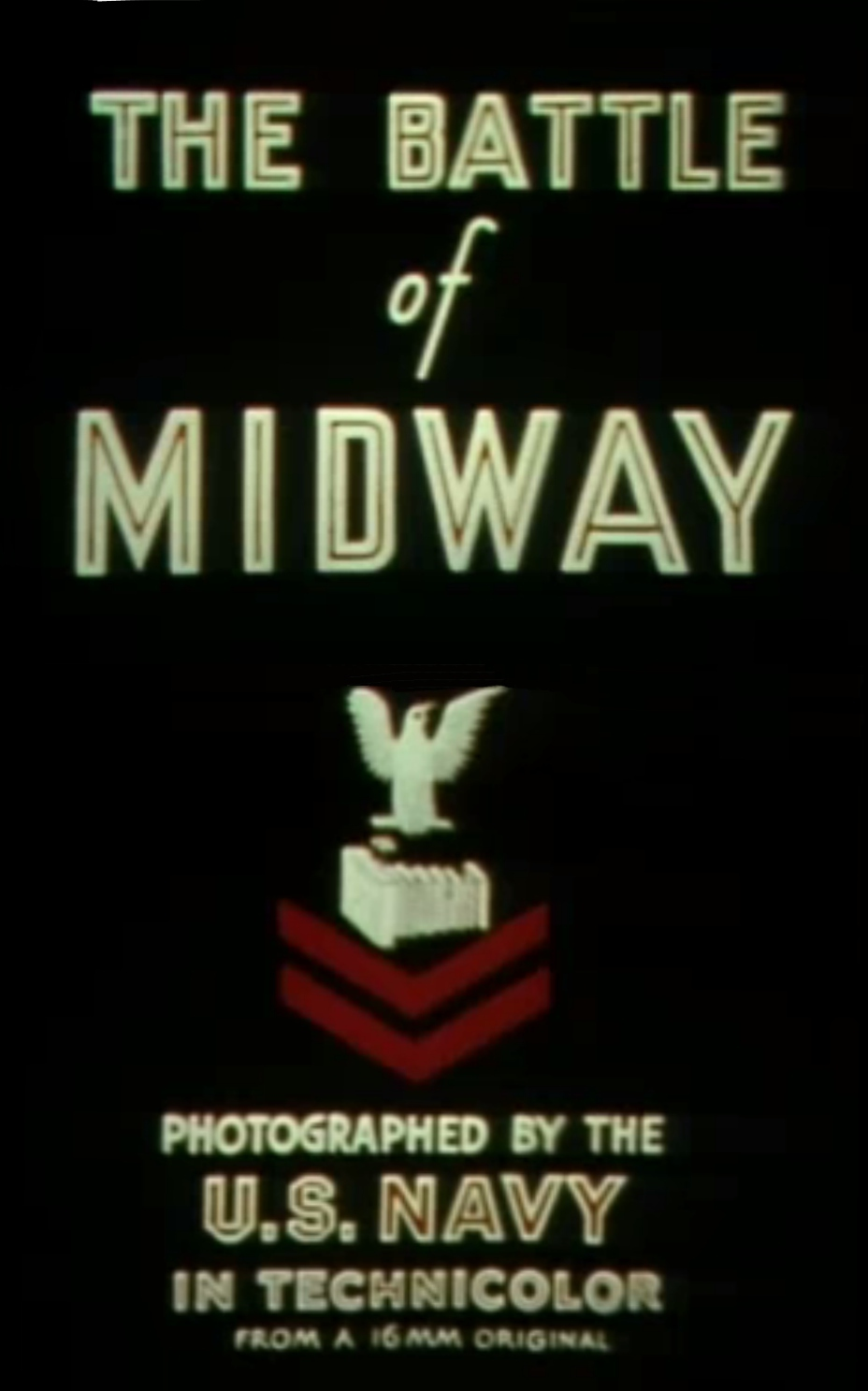
- Directed by: John Ford
- Written by: Dudley Nichols; James Kevin McGuinness
- Produced by: John Ford
- Narrated by: Donald Crisp; Henry Fonda; Jane Darwell
- Cinematography: John Ford; Jack MacKenzie; Kenneth M. Pier
- Edited by: John Ford; Robert Parrish
- Music by: Alfred Newman
- Production company: United States Navy
- Distributed by: 20th Century Fox
- Release date: September 14, 1942
- Running time: 18 minutes
- Country: USA
- Language: English

Full film

The Battle of Midway is a 1942 American short documentary film directed, co-edited and produced by John Ford. It is a montage of color footage of the Battle of Midway with voiceovers of narrators, Donald Crisp, Henry Fonda, and Jane Darwell.

The 18-minute film was distributed by 20th Century Fox, and earned one of four inaugural Academy Awards for Best Documentary in 1942.

== Plot ==
A narrator (Donald Crisp) informs the audience where Midway Island is and its strategic importance. About five minutes into the film the format changes somewhat, with more leisurely pictures of the G.I.s at work on the island, and then a female voiceover (by Jane Darwell) is introduced. It portrays a middle aged woman from Springfield, Ohio, recognizing a boy from her home town. He is Army Air Force pilot William E. "Junior" Kinney. Footage of the Kinney family back home is then introduced.

Abruptly the narrative (spoken by Henry Fonda) turns to the battle itself, with approximately five minutes dedicated to the defense of the island, the naval battle, and the immediate aftermath. A memorial service for those fallen during the battle follows, then PT boats sortieing for burials at sea.

This short ends with a series of text posters displaying various estimated Japanese losses (of four aircraft carriers, damage to or sinking of 28 other warships, and 300 aircraft destroyed).

The final poster is struck through with a large “V” for victory slashed in vivid red paint with a wide paintbrush.

== Production notes ==
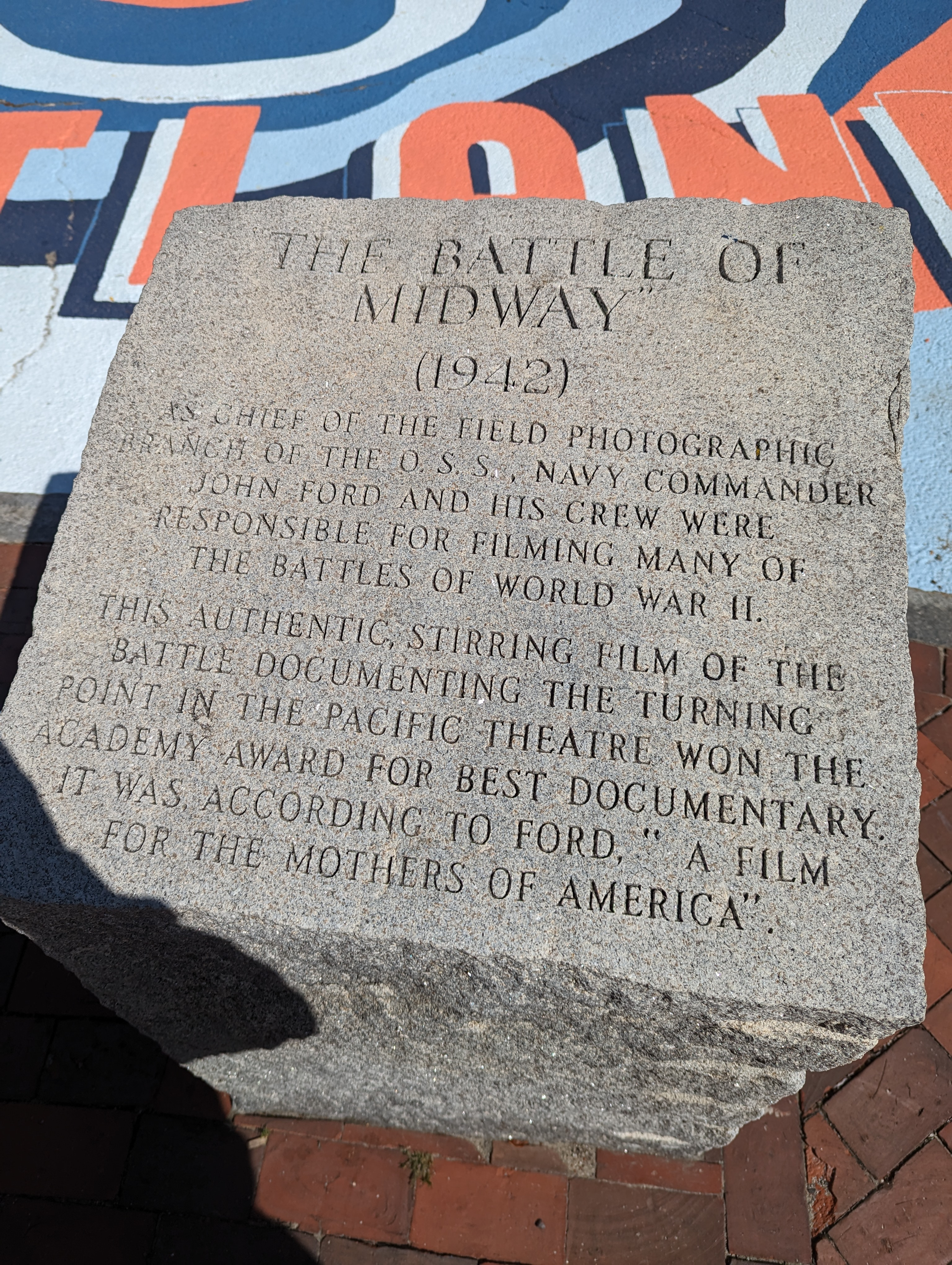
Stone inscription for The Battle of Midway at Ford's statue in Portland, Maine.

When the United States Navy sent former Oscar-winning Hollywood director Commander John Ford to Midway Island in 1942, he was assigned to photograph both for the records and for Navy intelligence assessment the work of guerrillas, saboteurs, and resistance outfits. He began by filming casual footage of the sailors and Marines on the base. Two days before the battle, he learned that the Japanese planned to attack the base and that it was preparing to defend itself.

Handheld 16mm footage of the battle was initially captured by Ford and cameraman Joseph August from the base’s power plant, located on the highest point on the island. Ford had been sent there the night before by the base commander, and was roused from his bunk there by the sounds of the battle, and started filming. Both men were wounded by enemy fire while filming the battle. Jack Mackenzie Jr. and Kenneth Pier also assisted Ford in filming.

Ford was worried that military censors would prevent the footage from being shown in public. After returning to Los Angeles, he gave the footage to Robert Parrish, who had worked with him on How Green Was My Valley, to edit in secret. Ford spliced in footage of James Roosevelt, President Franklin D. Roosevelt's son and a Marine Corps officer; when the president saw the film in the White House, he told William Leahy: "I want every mother in America to see this film", thus protecting Ford from censorship. Parrish wrote an in-depth account of the making of The Battle of Midway in his autobiography, Growing Up in Hollywood (1976).

The film runs for 18 minutes, was distributed by 20th Century Fox, and was one of four winners of the inaugural, 1942 Academy Award for Best Documentary.

Seeing men he had met and filmed die horrified Ford, who said, "I am really a coward" compared to those who fought. (Note: He had spent time with Torpedo Squadron 8, and 29 of 30 crewmen of the unit perished in the battle. In a separate, cinematic effort, Ford assembled the footage he had taken of the squadron into an eight-minute film, adding titles praising the squadron for having "written the most brilliant pages in the glowing history of our Naval Air Forces" and identifying each man as he appeared. He printed the result, Torpedo Squadron 8, to 8mm film suitable for home projectors and sent copies to the men's families.)

== Cast ==
- Donald Crisp as Main Narrator (voice)
- Henry Fonda as Narrator (voice)
- Jane Darwell as Narrator (voice)

== Preservation ==
The Academy Film Archive preserved The Battle of Midway in 2006. The film is part of the Academy War Film Collection, one of the largest collections of World War II era short films held outside government archives.

== Gallery ==
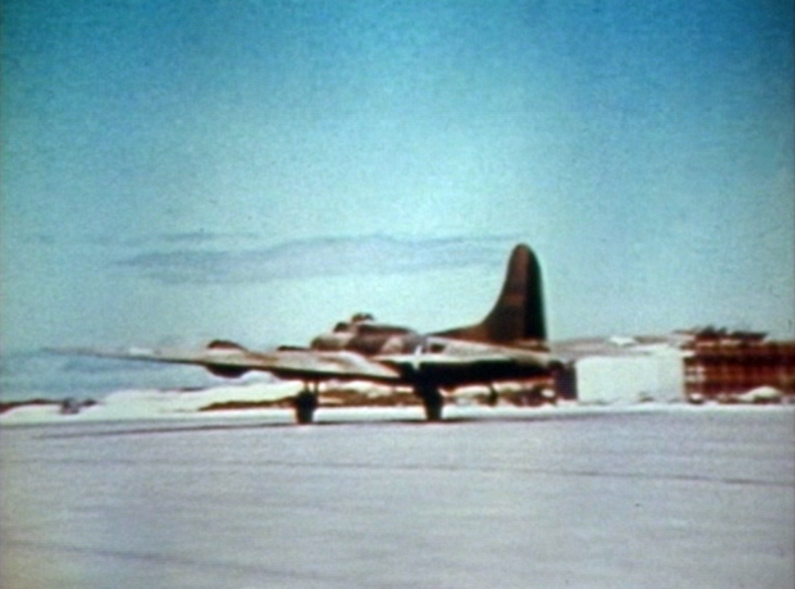
USAAF B-17E taking off

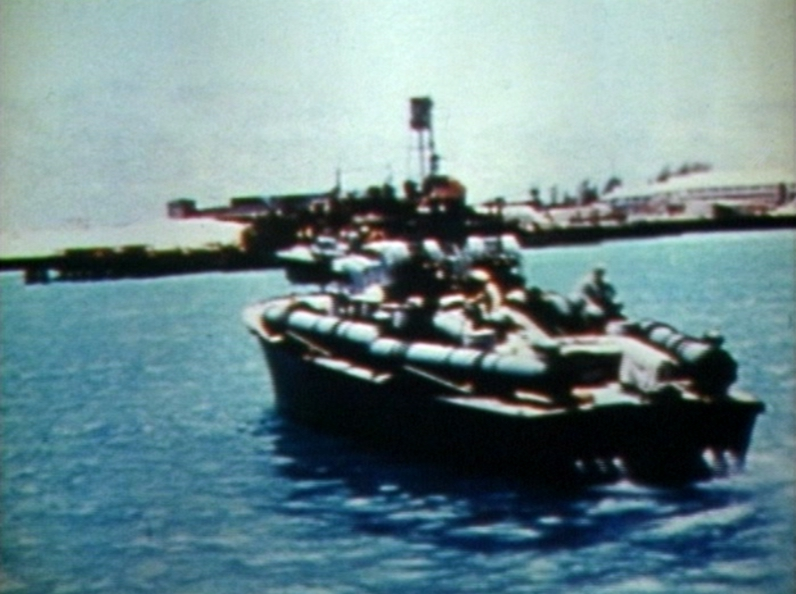
A PT boat off Sand Island

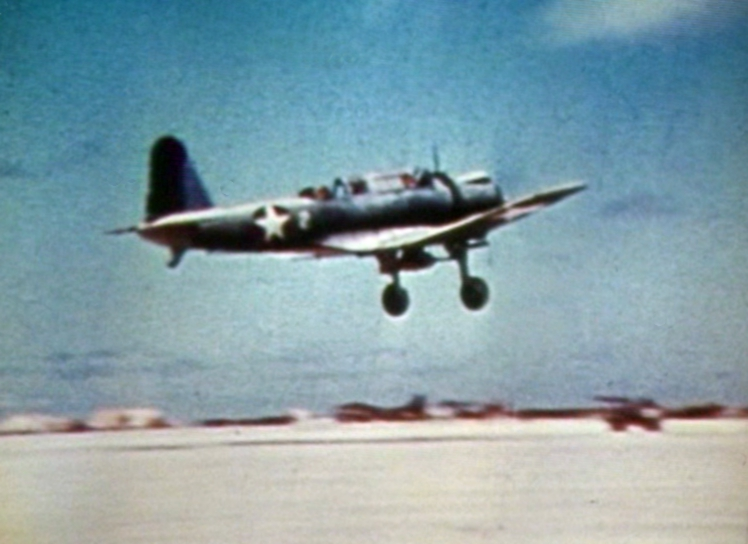
An SB2U-3 of VMSB-241 taking off

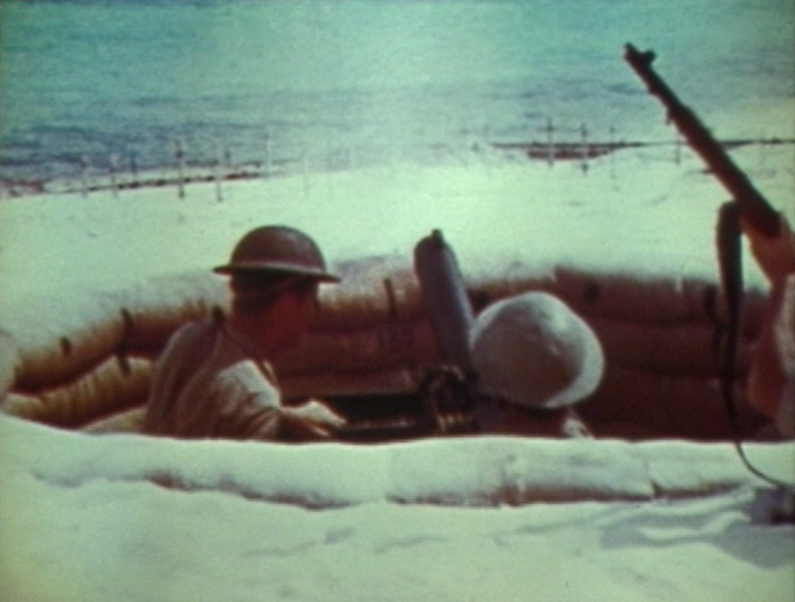
Marines firing a machine gun

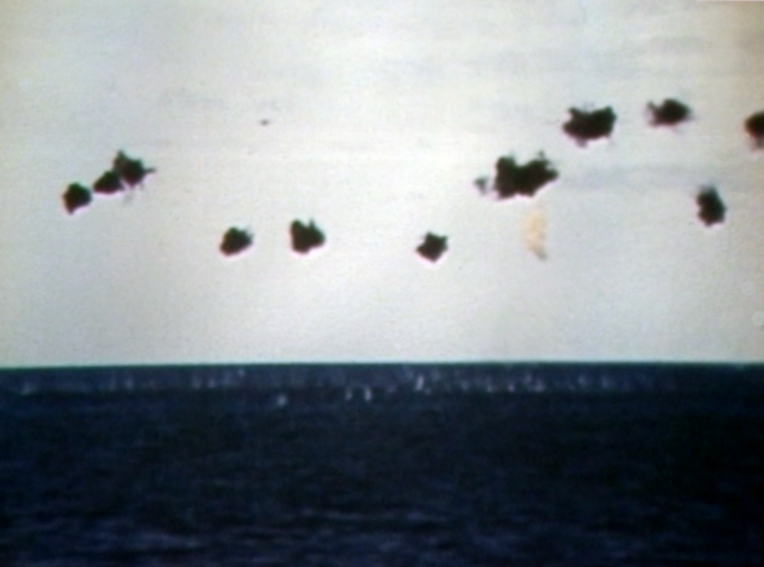
A flak barrage put up to defend against Japanese planes

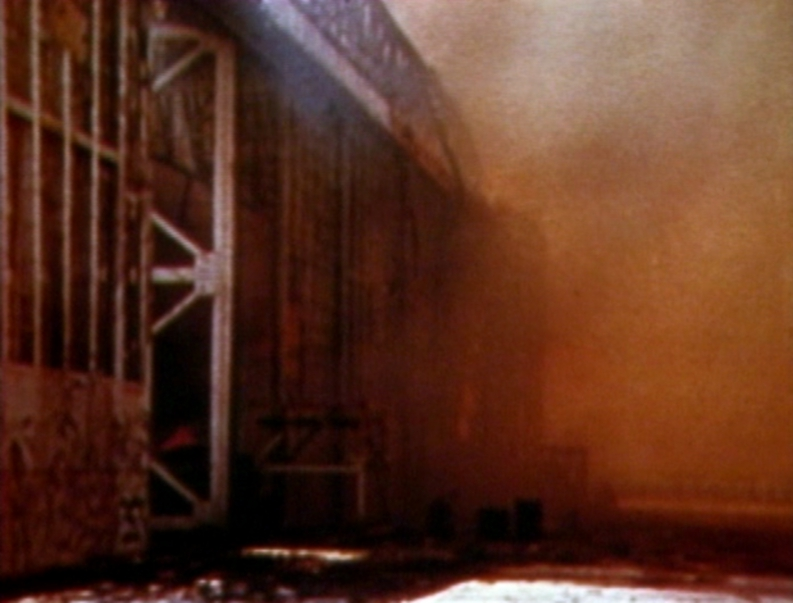
Seaplane hangar on Sand Island burning

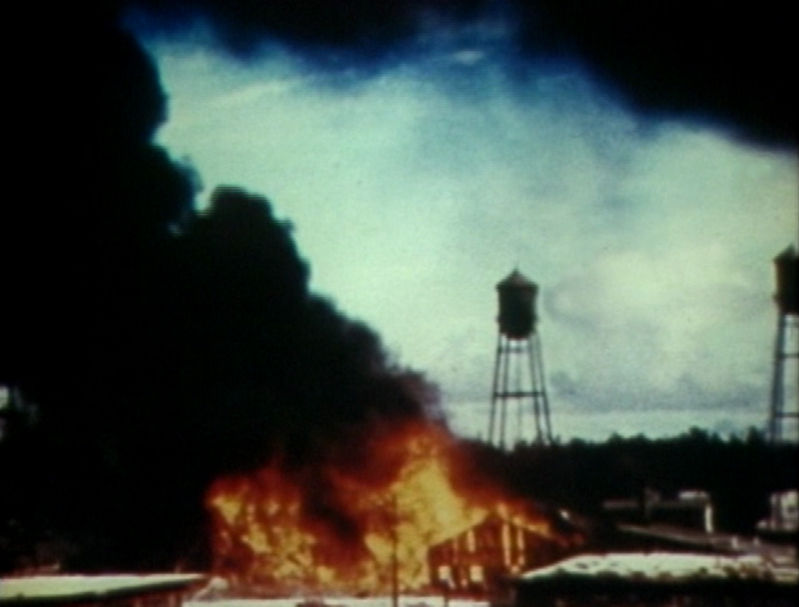
Bomb damage after the raid

== See also ==
- List of American films of 1942
- List of Allied Propaganda Films of World War 2
- Midway
