= Children of Mars =

1943 film

- Directed by: Frank Donovan
- Distributed by: RKO Radio Pictures
- Release date: 1943
- Country: United States
- Language: English

Children of Mars is a 1943 American short documentary film about child delinquency directed by Frank Donovan. It was part of RKO Pictures' documentary series This Is America. It was nominated for an Academy Award for Best Documentary Short.
