= Tomorrow We Fly =

1943 film

- Production company: Bureau of Aeronautics
- Distributed by: United States Navy
- Release date: 1943
- Running time: 21 minutes
- Country: United States
- Language: English

Tomorrow We Fly is a 1943 American short documentary film. It tells the parallel stories of building a plane and training an airman. It was nominated for an Academy Award for Best Documentary Short.
