= Swedes in America =

1943 film

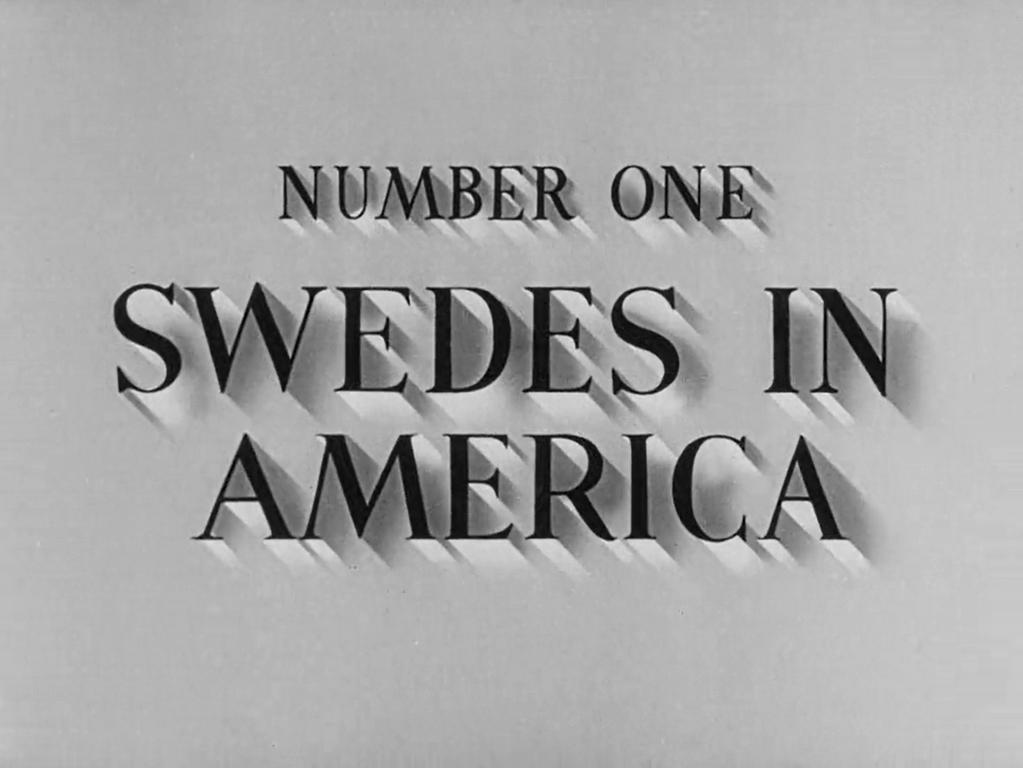
- Intertitle
- Directed by: Irving Lerner
- Narrated by: Ingrid Bergman
- Production company: United States Office of War Information
- Distributed by: United States Office of Education
- Release date: November 8, 1943
- Country: United States
- Language: English

Swedes in America is a 1943 American short documentary film directed by Irving Lerner and produced by the Overseas Motion Picture Bureau of the United States Office of War Information. It was nominated for an Academy Award for Best Documentary Short.
