= Jeff Young =

American guitarist

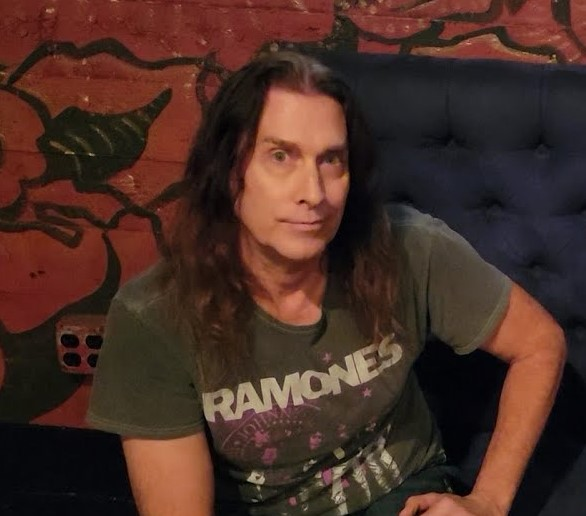
- Young in 2023

Background information
- Born: March 31, 1962 (age 64); Ann Arbor, Michigan, U.S.
- Genres: Thrash metal, heavy metal, speed metal, blues, classical
- Occupation: Guitarist
- Years active: 1986–present

Jeffrey "Jeff" Young (born March 31, 1962) is an American guitarist. He graduated from Musicians Institute in 1985, and is best known for his time with the thrash metal band Megadeth, appearing on the 1988 album So Far, So Good... So What! (Capitol Records). In 1998, Young co-wrote, produced and played on the world-fusion album Chameleon by Badi Assad. In addition to his subsequent music projects, he served as a writer for Guitar for the Practicing Musician.

He was inducted into the Metal Hall of Fame in 2025.

== Early life ==
Young was born in Ann Arbor, Michigan. In 1980, he graduated from Fairmont High School in Kettering, Ohio, and moved to Hollywood to attend The Guitar Institute of Technology in 1984. He graduated from the Institute in 1985 and began his career as a guitar teacher.

== Career ==
=== Megadeth ===
Newly hired Megadeth guitarist Jay Reynolds (of Malice) had commissioned Young, his guitar teacher, to play all of his solos on the new album, transcribe the previous Megadeth releases, and teach him everything in time for the pending tours. However, after witnessing Young transcribe Chris Poland's solos from Peace Sells... but Who's Buying? in less than 30 minutes, frontman Dave Mustaine decided instead to hire Young. Young joined the band with only two weeks left in the recording schedule and contributed half of the guitar solos and multiple electric and acoustic rhythm parts to the album.

Young's career with Megadeth was spent recording and touring in support of 1988's So Far, So Good... So What! His first performance with the band appeared in The Decline of Western Civilization Part II: The Metal Years.

In 1989, Young was fired from Megadeth due to reportedly "contemplating putting the moves on Diana" (Mustaine's fiancé) Young said he told Mustaine that this was untrue, but Mustaine fired him anyway.

=== Author and jazz & world fusion excursions ===
Following his time in Megadeth, Young wrote the Fingerprints column in Guitar for the Practicing Musician magazine. He also began intensive study of blues with guitarist Steve Hunter.

In the 1990s, Young stepped away from his career to deal with the untimely deaths of first his father and later his mother while studying music styles such as classical, flamenco, gypsy jazz.

In 1998, he resurfaced with new Brazilian musical partner and wife, Badi Assad. Together, they released Chameleon on Verve/PolyGram records. The album reached the top of the world music charts in Germany & Holland, also topping JAZZIZ magazine's Readers Poll: "Best Brazilian Albums of the Year."

Opening concerts for artists including Joe Cocker and Cassandra Wilson, as well as performances on 1999's Lilith Fair and Farm Aid 2000, Young has had songwriting collaborations with Sérgio Assad and wrote two pieces on Badi's Verde album.

In 2003, the track "Waves" from Chameleon was featured in the Michael and Kirk Douglas film It Runs in the Family.

=== Equilibrium ===
In late October 2009, his debut solo album, Equilibrium, was released after he began working on the album in 2000. Stylistically, the album features flamenco, classic, 6 & 12 steel-string guitar styles as well as the electric guitar. Equilibrium features guest performances by Debby Holiday, Twinkle, Gilli Moon, Lenine, Matt Chamberlain, Hilary Jones, Tony Franklin and Viviana Guzman.

=== Other projects ===
Young hosted the Internet radio show Music Without Boundaries on the Spreaker broadcast network.

Young has written, produced & released solo, instrumental music on the High-Tone Eleven Records label. His first, Revolutions, was released track by track with the singles, "Monsoon" – "In the Flesh" & "Slow Burn". Revolutions features performances from Tina Guo, Ric Fierrabracci, James LoMenzo, Brian Tichy, Jeff Bowders & Shane Gaalaas.

In 2022, Young reunited with former Megadeth bassist David Ellefson to form Kings of Thrash in order to perform old Megadeth songs live. The band have completed tours in North America, Australia, the UK and Europe, with one live album released. Some shows have featured fellow former Megadeth guitarist Chris Poland.

On January 22, 2025, Young was inducted into the Metal Hall of Fame, performing at the event which took place at the Grand Theater in Anaheim, California.

== Personal life ==
Young overcame testicular cancer in 2006; he was treated by Dr. Lawrence Einhorn.

== Discography ==
- 1988, Megadeth – So Far, So Good... So What!.
- 1998, Badi Assad – Chameleon
- 2003, It Runs in the Family (Soundtrack)
- 2010, Jeff Young – Equilibrium (Solo)
- 2013, Jeff Young – "Monsoon" (Solo single from Revolutions album)
- 2020, Jeff Young – "In the Flesh" (Solo single from Revolutions album)
- 2020, Jeff Young – "Slow Burn" (Solo single from Revolutions album)

Preceded by Chris Poland	Megadeth lead guitarist 1987–1989	Succeeded by Marty Friedman
