= Clarice Assad =

Brazilian-American musician (born 1978)

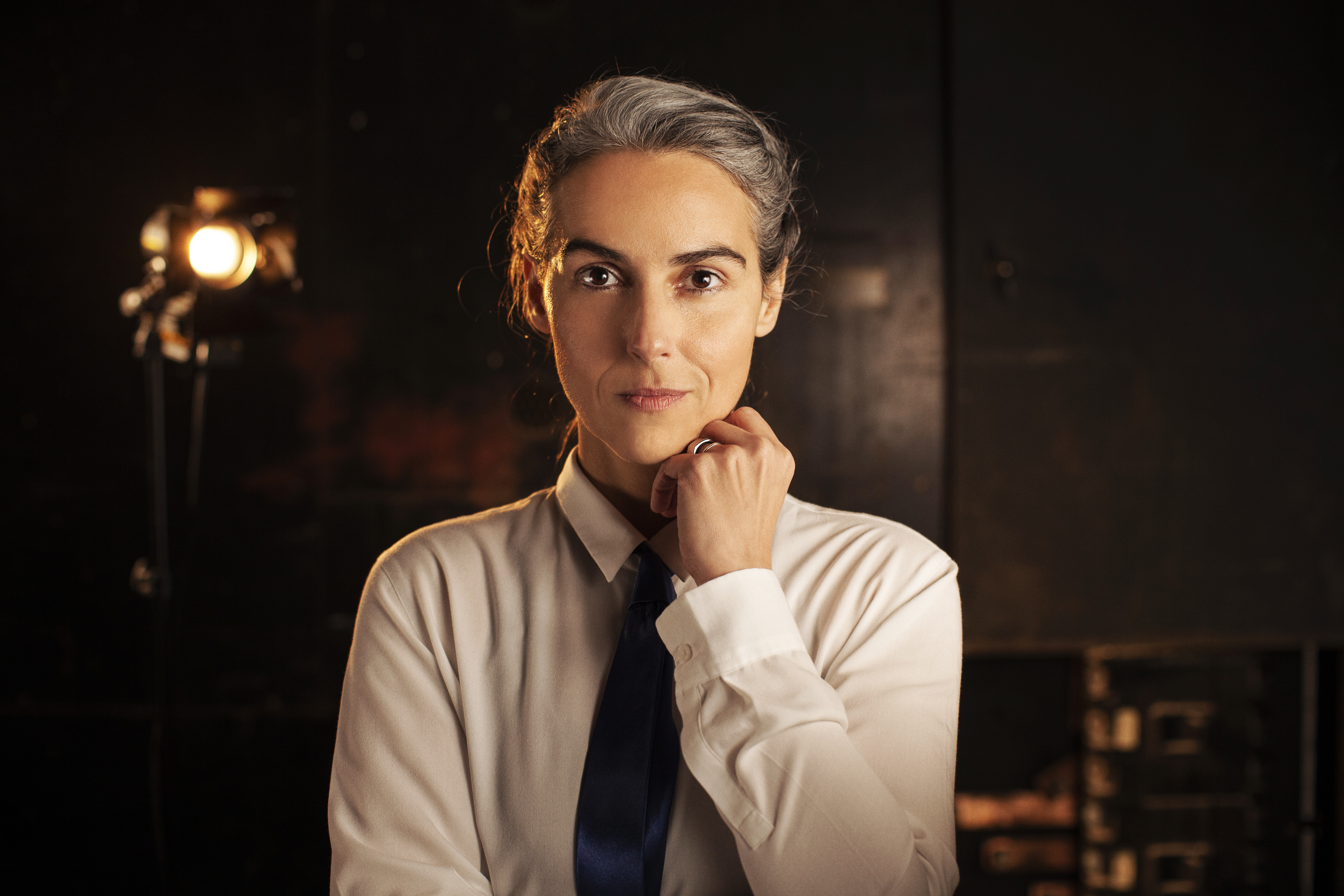

Background information
- Born: Clarice Vasconcelos da Cunha Assad Simão; February 9, 1978 (age 48); Rio de Janeiro, Brazil
- Genres: Jazz, classical, pop, world
- Occupations: Singer, composer, orchestrator, arranger
- Instruments: Piano, bass, voice
- Years active: 1996–present
- Labels: Adventure Music, Cedille
- Website: clariceassad.com

Clarice Assad (born February 9, 1978) is a Brazilian-American composer, pianist, arranger, singer, and educator from Rio de Janeiro. Her work is influenced by popular Brazilian culture, Romanticism, world music, and jazz. She comes from a musical family, which includes her father, guitarist Sergio Assad, her uncle, guitarist Odair Assad, and her aunt, singer-songwriter Badi Assad.

Assad has performed professionally since the age of seven. She holds a bachelor of music degree from Roosevelt University in Chicago and a master's degree in composition from the University of Michigan, where she studied composition with Michael Daugherty. She is a 2009 Latin Grammy and 2022 Grammy nominee.

== Early years ==
Born in Campo Grande, a suburb in the west portion of Rio de Janeiro, Brazil, Assad is the first daughter of musician Sergio Assad and school teacher Celia Maria Vasconcelos da Cunha, who named her child after the late Brazilian-Ukrainian writer Clarice Lispector. Assad began creating music at the age of six with the help of her father.

Assad was born with Ehlers–Danlos syndrome, a group of disorders that affect connective tissues, which severely limited her ability to perform with musical instruments at an early age, but the condition did not affect her voice. As a child, Assad sang numerous jingles for radio and television, as well as albums including tracks for pop star Luiz Caldas and Brazilian soul musician Hyldon. During early adolescence, as her joints became stronger, she began playing piano and became interested in jazz. The years that followed were filled with intensive training in music, piano, composition, and arrangements with Sheila Zagury, Linda Bustani, and Leandro Braga.

In 1993, Assad and her younger brother Rodrigo moved to France to live with their father, in a home he shared with his second wife and their child, Julia. Assad studied piano and improvisation privately with Natalie Fortin, a professor from Le Conservatoire national Supérieur de Paris, and benefited also from her father's mentorship, composing, and arranging of numerous pieces. This was a prolific period, though short-lived, amidst a turbulent time for Assad. Sergio Assad's wife, who had been battling cancer, died a year later at the age of 38 and Assad returned to Brazil with her brother.

In Rio de Janeiro, between 1995 and 1997, Assad performed as a pianist, arranger, and keyboardist on several musicals, including Tá na Hora by playwright Lucia Coelho, A Estrela Menina by Joaquim de Paula, and Doidas Folias by playwright and composer Tim Rescala. Though passionate about music, she struggled with the decision to pursue an academic degree, due to the limited prospects in the industry in Brazil. As she prepared to study for the entry college exams majoring in marine biology, her father, Sergio, met astrophysicist Angela Olinto, and moved to Chicago. A year later, Assad was given the opportunity to study film scoring at the Berklee College of Music, leaving Brazil in 1998.

== Career ==
=== Orchestral and chamber music ===
Assad's compositions include pieces for a variety of instruments, including smaller works for piano and guitar, as well as for large and small chamber ensembles, and orchestral works. Though the ensembles she writes are largely for classical music performances, her voice as a composer has been heavily influenced by Brazilian music, jazz, pop, and world music. Her overtures Nhanderú and Terra Brasilis, commissioned and premiered by the Orquestra Sinfônica do Estado de São Paulo are examples of her Brazilian roots, drawing on Assad's knowledge of the country's folk style and the work of fellow classical composer Heitor Villa-Lobos. Earlier works influenced by Brazilian popular culture include the concerto for guitar and orchestra, O Saci-Pererê and Brazilian Fanfare, an overture for orchestra commissioned by the Chattanooga Orchestra in 2005.

Assad first came into the national spotlight in 2004, when conductor Marin Alsop included her violin concerto with the Cabrillo Festival of Contemporary Music featuring Nadja Salerno-Sonnenberg as the soloist. The piece was recorded by Salerno-Sonnenberg and Marin Alsop leading the Colorado Symphony Orchestra and released on the NSS Music label when Assad was 26 years old. Since then, Assad has been steadily commissioned, incorporating her composing and performing. Such efforts culminated in the creation of a major work: a concerto for scat singing, piano and orchestra which she wrote for herself to perform. Scattered was premiered by the Albany Symphony under the baton of the conductor David Alan Miller, and has since been performed by many other ensembles and conductors, including the Michigan Philharmonic, Chicago Composers Orchestra and OCAM. Other works include The Disappeared, a political piece for orchestra and concert band that draws on impressions of Rufina Amaya, the sole survivor of the El Mozote massacre in 1981, during the Salvadoran Civil War, and most recently, Ad Infinitum, a percussion concerto written for Dame Evelyn Glennie involving improvisational gestural techniques—such as sound painting—for the orchestra, soloist and conductor alike.

Her music has been commissioned by many institutions, performers and orchestras including Carnegie Hall, The Boston Philharmonic Youth Orchestra, the Los Angeles Philharmonic, the Philadelphia Orchestra, the Orquestra Sinfônica do Estado de São Paulo, General Electric, the Chicago Sinfonietta, and Duo Noire. Her works have also been recorded by some of the most prominent names in the classical contemporary music scene, including cellist Yo-Yo Ma, violinist Nadja Salerno-Sonnenberg, pianist Anne-Marie McDermott and oboist Liang Wang. She has also collaborated with the Los Angeles Guitar Quartet, Turtle Island String Quartet, the Aquarelle Guitar Quartet, the Philadelphia Orchestra, Louisville Symphony Orchestra, Austin Symphony Orchestra, Vancouver Symphony Orchestra, Edmonton Symphony, as well as conductors Marin Alsop and Christoph Eschenbach, Kazuyoshi Akiyama and Carlos Miguel Prieto. She has written extensively for active members of the new music scene including the Cavatina Duo, Takács Quartet, SOLI ensemble and violinist Pekka Kuusisto.

Assad has served as composer-in-residence for KMFA, MIT, the Saint Paul Chamber Orchestra, the Albany Symphony, the Cabrillo Festival of Contemporary Music and the Boston Landmarks Orchestra. She served as the composer-in-residence for the Allentown Symphony Orchestra in 2023.

Assad's works have been published in France (Editions Lemoine), Germany (Trekel), in the United States (Virtual Artists Collective Publishing), and Brazil (Criadores do Brasil).

=== Other projects ===
Assad has contributed significantly to the growing repertoire of classical guitar, having written works ranging from solos to duos (Valsas do Rio) and quartets such as the piece Bluezilian, which has become a staple of the guitar quartet repertoire. Larger works include two concertos: O Saci-Pererê, for solo guitar and chamber orchestra, commissioned by the Harris Foundation, and Folk Tales, a concerto for two guitars and string orchestra commissioned by the Tychy Guitar Festival for the Brazil Guitar duo.

Her latest release of the album Archetypes, performed with her father Sérgio Assad and Chicago-based ensemble Third Coast Percussion, received 2022 Grammy nominations in the Best Chamber Music/Small Ensemble Performance and Best Contemporary Classical Composition categories. The collaboratively written program conjures a dozen universal archetypes through a mélange of chamber music and Latin jazz rhythms.

In 2010, Assad wrote a concerto for scat singing, piano and orchestra, named Scattered. Many other works followed in this genre, and in 2019, Assad wrote Synthetico, a work for chamber ensemble and vocal electronics. In her continuing explorations with expanding the sonic palette of the voice, both acoustically and through electronic means, Assad also engages audiences directly to immerse themselves in the music. Her 2019 work, É Gol!, which was inspired by the legendary female Brazilian soccer player Marta Vieira da Silva, is scored for full orchestra and features active participation by audience members singing, performing body percussion movements, and making sound effects.

Assad's first work for the stage was a soundtrack written for a 2001 adaptation of Argentinian playwright Carlos Mathus's play La Lección de Anatomía, originally published in the 1970s. Directed by an original cast member, Antonio Leiva, the space received mixed reviews but garnered the composer favorable mentions from the acclaimed theater critic Bárbara Heliodora. Following a hiatus of over a decade, Assad resumed writing for the stage in 2010, when choreographer Kristi Spessard invited her—then in residency at Mabou Mines—to compose the score to her piece Essentials of Flor.

Recent works include the ballets Iara (2018), and Sin Fronteras (2017), Opera das Pedras (libretto by Denise Milan, 2010) and collaborations with librettist Niloufar Talebi (The Disinherited) and playwright E.M. Lewis (The Crossing). Strongly shaped by a conscious drive towards narrative, her works wear its influences well, feeling inspired rather than derivative.

Assad has worked with numerous youth groups through residency programs, often culminating in performances involving large ensembles and orchestras. Most notable are Assad's partnerships with ZUMIX in East Boston and the Boston Landmarks Orchestra; partnerships between the Michigan Philharmonic with WRCJ-FM Detroit public radio and the Detroit School of Arts; as well as the collaboration with Girls INC. and the Albany Symphony that resulted in a pop piece based on Sojourner Truth's speech "Ain't I a Woman". Assad's projects tend on focus on social impact programs that involve empowering young women.

On November 20, 2022, trumpetist Mary Elizabeth will debut Assad's new concerto for Trumpet and Orchestra, Bohemian Queen, with the Chicago Youth Symphony Orchestra.

=== Arranger ===
Assad was the featured composer for the 2008–2009 season at the New Century Chamber Orchestra, where she worked as the orchestra's primary arranger and orchestrator for a decade.

Upon graduating from the University of Michigan, Assad moved to New York City to experience the exploding music scene, freelancing as a composer and arranger while trying to build a career as pianist and singer. During her New York years (2005–2015), Assad worked as the featured composer for the New Century Chamber Orchestra, as well as serving as the orchestra's primary arranger from 2007 to 2017, contributing vastly to the addition of new works for strings, by orchestrating and transcribing over twenty five major works from the symphonic repertoire, including Mussorgsky's Pictures at an Exhibition, Richard Strauss's Dance of the Seven Veils from the opera Salome, and George Gershwin's An American in Paris.

Assad's orchestrations are similar to composers such as Maurice Ravel and Nicolai Rimsky-Korsakov, while retaining a personal, unique fingerprint.

=== Performer ===
Hailed by the LA Times as a "dazzling soloist," Assad is an accomplished singer and pianist and appears frequently with orchestras and chamber music ensembles, performing her original works or arrangements of classical, Brazilian, jazz, and contemporary music.

In 2010, Assad began performing more frequently, and eventually founded the international ensemble Off the Cliff, an energetic and daring four-piece ensemble of internationally accomplished musicians.

Notable performances include the Savannah Music Festival, Moab and the Mendocino Music Festival. Included amongst the venues and series where Off the Cliff has appeared on are Jazz at Lincoln Center in New York City and Doha, Qatar, The Stone, Cal Performances in San Francisco, and Sesc São Paulo in Brazil. Special guest artists have included Japanese singer Hiromi Suda, Swiss-American singer Beat Kaestli, clarinetist Derek Bermel, mandolinist Mike Marshall, Paquito D'Rivera and the group Choro Famoso.

=== Educator ===
Assad takes the immersive experience outside of the concert hall with the accessible VOXploration, which she created in 2015. The award-winning education program offers a creative and accessible approach to music education through interactive experiences. In an era where digital interaction is part of the daily routine, the class encourages participants to utilize their bodies and voices as musical instruments in spontaneous music creation, songwriting, and improvisation. It has been curated for participants of any age or musical background and has been presented worldwide.

== Awards in composition ==
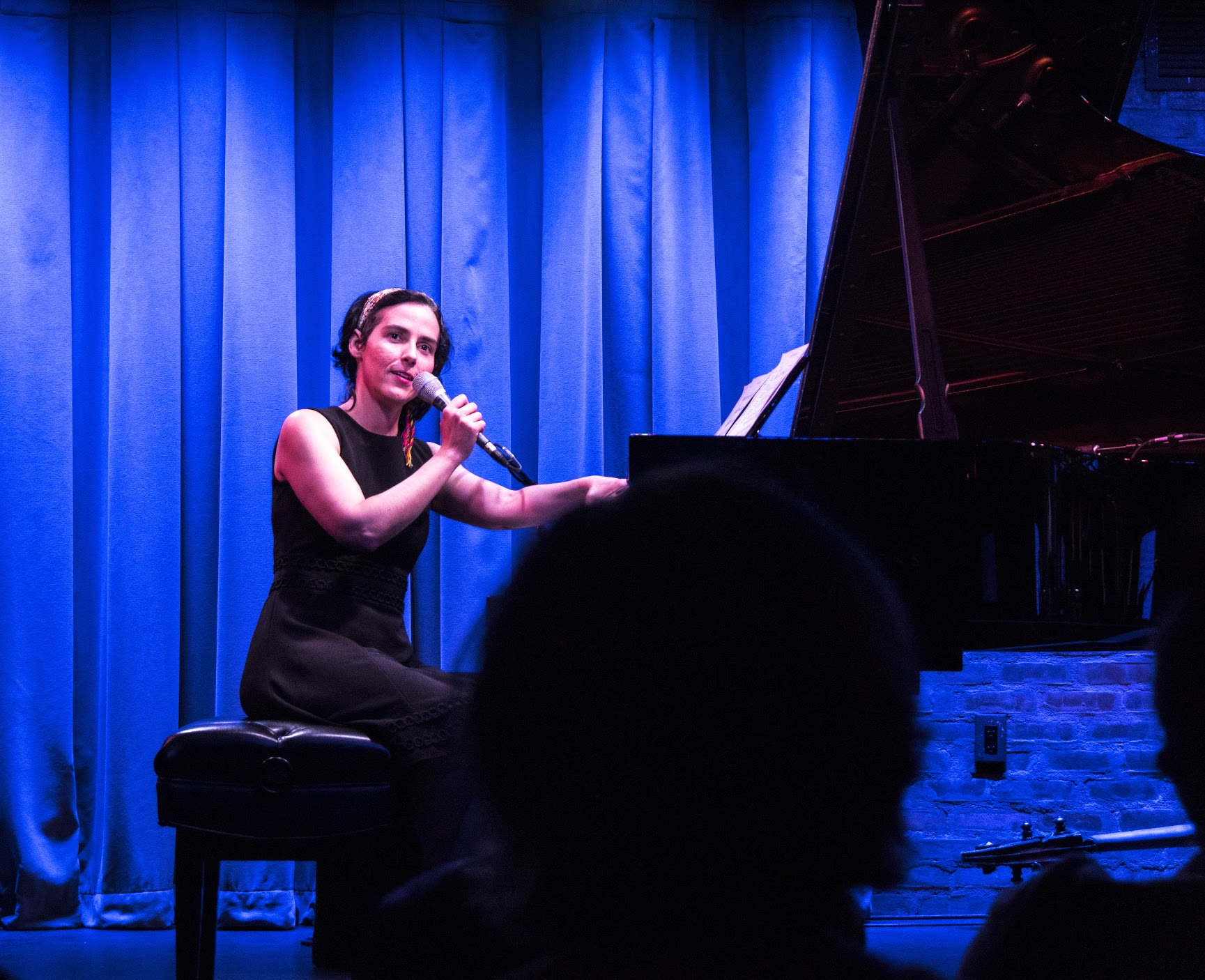
Assad performing at the New York Festival of Song

Assad is one of Assad is among eight artists honored with the 2025 Meier Achievement Awards, she is also the recipient of the American Composers Forum National Composition Competition (2016), the McKnight Visiting Composer Award (2015), the New Music Alive Partnership program (League of American Orchestras, 2014–2015), the Van Lier Fellowship (2010), Latin Grammy nomination for best contemporary composition (2009), the Aaron Copland Award (2007), the Morton Gould Young Composer Award (2006), All Songs Considered - NPR (2004), the Franklin Honor Society Award (2001), and the Samuel Ostrowsky Humanities Award (2001).

== Discography ==
- Invitation: Introducing Clarice Assad (2004)
- Love, All That It Is (NSS Music, 2008)
- Home (Adventure Music, 2011)
- Imaginarium (Adventure Music, 2014)
- Clarice Assad & Friends: Live at the Deer Head Inn (Deer Head Inn, 2016)
- Reliquia (Adventure Music, 2016)
- Archetypes Third Coast Percussion, Clarice Assad, Sérgio Assad (Cedille Records, 2021)
- Window To The World: A Tribute to Milton Nascimento: Clarice Assad, Johan Dynnesen, Francesco Calì and Jesper Bodilsen (Vectordisc Records, 2022)

=== Recorded works ===
List of recorded compositions
Album Title	Album Details	Title of recorded work(s)	Release date
HEARTH	Artists: Miró Quartet; Label: PENTATONE; Instrumentation: String Quartet	In Dulce Jubilo (Arrangement)	11/28/2025
CLARICE	Artists: Clarice Assad & Harumi Rhodes; Label: Elusive Disc; Instrumentation: Voice, piano, and violin	Constellation / Luminous	10/08/2025
RIVER OF FIRE	Artists: The Cavatina Duo & Pacifica Quartet; Label: Cedille Records; Instrumentation: Flute, Guitar, and String Quartet	Four Scenes *Uma Mesma Outra Lenda	03/14/2025
The Book of Spells	Artists: The Merian Ensemble; Label: Navona Records; Instrumentation: Small Chamber Ensemble/Solo Harp	The Book of Spells/ Solais	08/02/2024
Storyteller: Contemporary Concertos for Trumpet	Artists: Mary Elizabeth Bowden, Chicago Youth Symphony Orchestra, Allen Tinkham; Label: Cedille Records; Instrumentation: String Orchestra, Trumpet	Bohemian Queen	06/14/2024
Manuscripts Don't Burn	Artists: Inna Faliks; Label: Sono Luminus; Instrumentation: Piano and Narration	Godai, The Hero	05/17/2024
Takacs, Assad, Labro (1st Prize Winner: Global Music Awards)	Artists: Takacs String Quartet, Clarice Assad and Julien Labro; Label: Yarlung Records; Instrumentation: String quartet, piano and voice	Clash, Constellation	03/08/2024
Soul of Brazil	Artists: Delgani Quartet and Clarice Assad; Label: Avie Records; Instrumentation: String quartet, piano and voice	Glith	10/13/2023
Love at Last	Artists: Lara Downes, piano; Label: Pentatone; Instrumentation: Solo Violin and Piano	A World of Change	04/21/2023
Symmetria Pario Creation	Artists: Pekka Kuusisto, violin; Joonas Ahonen, piano; Label: Yarlung Records; Instrumentation: Solo Violin and Piano	Symmetries	04/14/2023
This Is America: An Anthology 2020-2021	Artists: Johnny Gandelsman & Clarice Assad; Label: In a Circle Records; Instrumentation: Solo Violin and Voices	O	05/13/2022
Identidade	Artists: Andrea Gonzáles Caballero, Amalia Tortajada; Label: Instrumentation: Guitar and Flute	Tríptico	2021
Candombe!	Artists: Sicarú; Label: Instrumentation: Guitar Octet	De Norte A Sul	2021
Archetypes	Artists: Clarice Assad, Sergio Assad, [Third Coast Percussion], Label: Cedille Records; Instrumentation: Percussion, Guitar, Piano and Vocals	Rebel, Hero, Caregiver, Jester	2021
Project W: Works by Diverse Women Composers	Artists: Clarice Assad, Jessie Montgomery, Reena Esmail, Jennifer Higdon, Mei-Ann Chen, Chicago Sinfonietta; Label: Cedille Records; Instrumentation: Symphonic Orchestra	Sin Fronteras	2019
Ascent	Artists: Matthew Lipman & Henry Kramer; Label: Cedille Records; Instrumentation: Viola, piano	METAMORFOSE	2019
Night Triptych	Artists: Duo Noire; Label: New Focus Recordings; Instrumentation: two guitars	Hocus Pocus	2018
Sephardic Journey	Artists: Cavatina Duo; Label: Cedille Records; Instrumentation: flute, guitar and string quartet	Sephardic Suite	2016
Four Aces Guitar Quartet	Artists: Four Aces Guitar Quartet; Label: Cedille Antarctica Records; Instrumentation: 4 guitars	Danzas	2016
La Valse	Artists: Will Duchon, piano; Label: Independent release; Instrumentation: solo piano transcription by Will Duchon	Slow Waltz	2015
Eterna	Artists: De Stefano, Fortino; Label: Dotguitar SRL; Instrumentation: 2 guitars	Brasileirinhas | Mercador de Sonhos	2015
Ondulando	Artists: Duo Eterna; Label: Dotguitar SRL; Instrumentation: solo guitar	The Last Song	2015
Collage	Artists: Beat Kaestli; Label: Independent	Comme En Plein Rêve; (Clarice Assad/Antoine Loyer)	2014
From A to Z	Artists: Nadja Salerno-Sonnenberg & The New Century Chamber Orchestra; Label: NSS Music; Instrumentation: solo violin and string orchestra	Dreamscapes	2014
Viva Brasil	Artists: Odair Assad, Sergio Assad, Joseph Gramley, Yo-Yo Ma, Kathryn Stott; Label: Sony Music Masterworks; Instrumentation: 2 guitars, piano, percussion and violoncello	The Lat Song | Suite Back To Our Roots	2012
The Balkan Project	Artists: Cavatina Duo; Label: Cedille Records; Instrumentation: flute and guitar	Three Balkan Dances	2010
Originis, Live from Brazil	Artists: Nadja Salerno-Sonnenberg, violin | Sergio & Odair Assad; Label: NSS Music; Instrumentation: 2 guitars and violin	Three Sketches	2009
Chasing Light	Artists: The San Francisco Guitar Quartet; Label: Independent release; Instrumentation: 4 guitars	Bluezilian	2009
Together	Artists: The New Century Chamber Orchestra; Label: Nss Music; Instrumentation: string orchestra	Impressions, Suite For Chamber Orchestra	2009
Spirit of Brazil	Artists: Aquarelle Guitar Quartet; Label: Chandos Records; Instrumentation: 4 guitars	Danças Nativas; Bluezilian	2009
Jardim Abandonado	Artists: Sergio & Odair Assad; Label: Nonesuch Records; Instrumentation: 2 guitars	Valsas do Rio	2008
Brazil	Artists: LA Guitar Quartet; Label: Telarc Records; Instrumentation: 4 guitars	Bluezilian	2007
Yo-Yo Ma & Friends	Artists: Yo-Yo Ma	Família; Sergio & Clarice Assad	2008
Brasileirinhas	Artists: Sheila Zagury, piano; Daniela Spielmann, saxophone; Label: Independent; piano and guitar arrangement; Originally scored for mandolin orchestra	Song for my father	2007
Concertos in D Major	Artists: Nadja Salerno-Sonnenberg, violin; Marin Alsop, conductor; Colorado Symphony Orchestra; Label: NSS Music; Instrumentation: *violin and orchestra	Violin Concerto	2005
Xeque-Mate	Artists: Boris Gaquere, guitar; Odair Assad, guitar; Label: Vgo Recordings; Instrumentation: 2 guitars	Valsas do Rio	2003
Velho Retrato	Artists: Sergio Assad, guitar; Gabrielle Mirabassi; Label: EGEA; Instrumentation: guitar and clarinet	Flutuante	1999

=== Arrangements & Guest Appearances ===
List of guest appearances on albums
Title	Album details
Payin' My Dues (Tracks: (4. Cai Dentro, by Baden Powell and Paulo César Pinheiro )	Release date: January 20, 2023; Label: Jazz Hang Records; Clarice Assad: Vocals; Jay Lawrence And The Platinum Jazz Orchestra
Transparent (Tracks: All Tracks)	Release date: September 25, 2020; Label: Music For Dreams; Clarice Assad: Arrangements.; Ole Theill and Kenneth Knudsen: Artists
O cinema que o sol não apaga (Track: Cantilena Alada)	Release date: June 1, 2018; Label: Rocinante discos; Clarice Assad: 4 part vocal overdub; Thiago Amud: Artist
Bandzilla rises (Track 13: Tip for a toreador)	Release date: November 18, 2016; Label: Bandzilla Records; Clarice Assad: Scat singing; Richard Niles: Composer & producer
MIL COISAS (Track 3: Quis Acreditar)	Release date: 2014; Label: Independent; Clarice Assad: Arranger; Clara Valente: Singer-Songwriter
QUERELAS DO BRASIL ( All Tracks)	Release date: 2014; Label: GHA Records; Clarice Assad: Arranger, piano & vocals; Carolina Assad: Singer
The Elkcloner ( Track 5: Have you seen my baby?)	Release date: July 9, 2012; Label: EMI MUSIC; Clarice Assad: Piano, scat singing; Filip Mitrovic: Composer & Producer
The Music of Astor Piazzola ( Three Piazzolla etudes)	Release date: 2010; Label: (Bridge Records); Clarice Assad: Arranger; Cavatina Duo: Artists
Merry, A Holiday Journey (Nadja Salerno-Sonnenberg & Friends)	Release date: 2006; Label: (NSS Music); Clarice Assad: Arranger, singer.
WONDERLAND: Badi Assad (Tracks: 2,4,7 & 11.)	Release date: 2005; Label: (Deutsche Grammophon); Clarice Assad: Arranger; Badi Assad: Artist
VERDE: Badi Assad (Track: Viola, meu bem)	Release date: 2004; Label: (Universal Classics); Clarice Assad: Arranger; Badi Assad: Artist

== Interviews ==
- Breaking Barriers at Ravinia highlights women composers- Chicago Tribune
- Indicados ao Grammy 2022, Clarice e Sérgio Assad aliam a paixão pela arte e o carinho de família em composições reconhecidas mundo afora- Revista 29 HORAS
- A família de virtuoses do piano e violão que pôs o Brasil no Grammy - Revista VEJA
- Clarice Assad radio interview on UEL, Londrina. Modos de Vida - Comportamento e Cultura
- Dreamscapes Q&A with Clarice Assad – SoundAdvice.
- Chicago Sinfonietta Commissions CLARICE ASSAD's SIN FRONTERAS Preview – Insights to Assad and her Work.
- SONiC Composer Spotlight – Clarice Assad – SoundAdvice.
- University of Chicago Presents: An interview with Clarice Assad
- ABODE MAGAZINE: From Brazil to Carnegie Hall to Doha (p. 106-107)
- REVISTA 29 HORAS: DNA Musical
- The Portfolio Composer: Ep 8-Clarice Assad on the Endless Possibilities of New Music and Letting Go
- 1TrackPodcast: Season 2, Episode 3.
- Composer Clarice Assad was born and raised in Brazil, but has spent the last few decades in the United States. When she's asked where home is, she says, "The Americas."
- Brazilian and classical music merge in performance from Clarice Assad and two Houston ensembles.
