= Chameleon (Badi Assad album) =

Studio album by Badi Assad
- Released: 1998
- Label: i.e. music/PolyGram

Badi Assad chronology
Echoes of Brazil (1997)	Chameleon (1998)	Nowhere (2002)

Chameleon is an album by the Brazilian musician Badi Assad, released in 1998. Assad sang in Portuguese and English. The album was an international success.

== Production ==
Chameleon was produced in part by Assad. Jeff Young played guitar and Viviana Guzmán played flute. Lee Ritenour produced "Waves"; "Ponta de Areia" is a cover of the Milton Nascimento song. Chameleon also included a cover of George Harrison's "While My Guitar Gently Weeps". Assad used llama hooves as part of a large number of percussive instruments.

== Critical reception ==
Professional ratings
Review scores
Source	Rating
AllMusic	4.5/5 stars
The Evening Post	1/5 stars
MusicHound World: The Essential Album Guide	4/5 stars

The Vancouver Sun wrote that "the singer-guitarist blends lyricless vocal performances, songs sung in Portuguese and English and her own rich acoustic guitar with tasteful arrangements that incorporate string trios, percussion and didgeridoo." The Herald thought that the album "isn't entirely consistent but her invention, sensuality and air of mystery should prime an audience for future adventures."

The Toronto Star concluded that "the Brazilian singer/composer/guitarist/vocalist/marimba player blends pop, Flamenco and neo-jazz in a cheerful kaleidoscope of moods that amounts to little more than happy songs and instrumental dexterity despite exotic backing combos and incendiary hype." The Evening Post panned the album, writing: "A mixture of pop, jazz and Latin sounds, and infused with New Age themes that sound banal, Assad delivers an album that you are likely to hear when next you visit the health food store."

AllMusic wrote that the "delicate, expressive vocals and flamenco-tinged, acoustic guitar phrases are simply beautiful."

== Track listing ==
No.	Title	Length
1.	"Rhythms of the World"
2.	"Butterfly"
3.	"Waves"
4.	"Ai Que Saudade d'ocê"
5.	"Naked"
6.	"Naio Naio"
7.	"Rain Trance"
8.	"Waterfall"
9.	"Dolphins in the Blue Mist"
10.	"Ponta de Areia"
11.	"While My Guitar Gently Weeps"
12.	"Flowing ... into Formlessness"
