= Angela Olinto =

American physicist and professor

Angela Villela Olinto
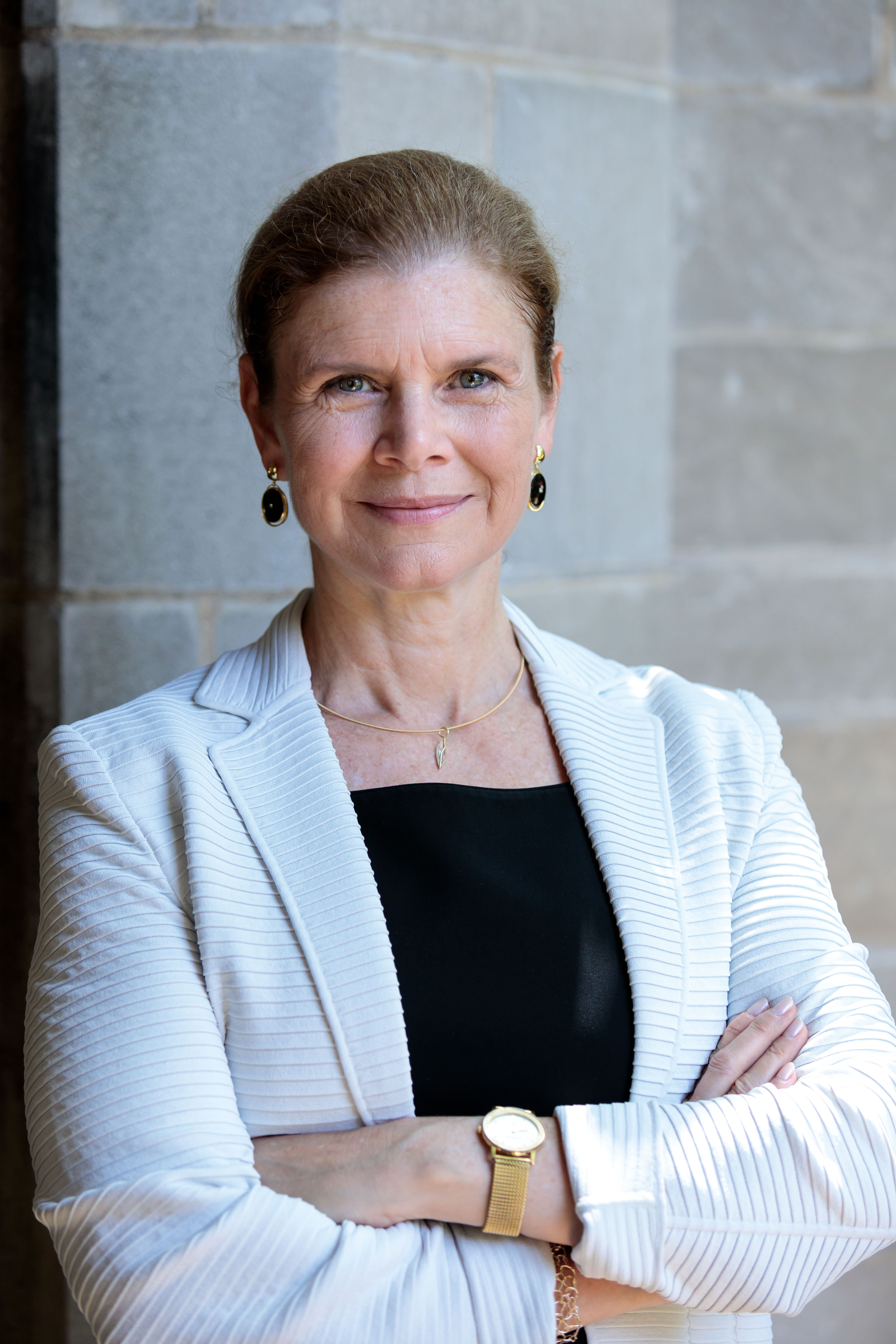
- Born: July 19, 1961 (age 65); Boston, Massachusetts, U.S.
- Education: Pontifical Catholic University of Rio de Janeiro (BS); Massachusetts Institute of Technology (PhD)
- Occupations: Astroparticle physicist; provost; professor
- Spouse: Sérgio Assad
- Awards: Fellow, National Academy of Sciences; Fellow, American Academy of Arts and Sciences; Fellow, Brazilian Academy of Sciences; Commander, Order of Rio Branco
- Scientific career
- Fields: Astrophysics
- Institutions: University of Chicago; Columbia University
- Thesis: The astrophysics of strange matter (1987)

Angela Villela Olinto (born July 19, 1961) is an American and Brazilian astroparticle physicist who is the Provost of Columbia University and Lewis Morris Rutherfurd Professor of Astronomy and Professor of Physics. Previously, she served as the Albert A. Michelson Distinguished Service Professor at the University of Chicago as well as the dean of the Physical Sciences Division. Her current work is focused on understanding the origin of high-energy cosmic rays, gamma rays, and neutrinos.

== Early life and education ==
Olinto was born in Boston, Massachusetts, during her father's graduate studies at the Massachusetts Institute of Technology. The family moved back to Rio de Janeiro, Brazil, when she was a toddler. She lived in Rio and Brasilia and received her bachelor's degree in physics from Pontifical Catholic University of Rio de Janeiro in 1981. As she was finishing her undergraduate studies, she became ill with what was later diagnosed as polymyositis. She pursued graduate studies at the Massachusetts Institute of Technology and received a Doctor of Philosophy in Physics in 1987.

== Career ==
After her Ph.D., Olinto joined the Fermilab Theoretical Astrophysics Group as a postdoc. From Fermilab, Olinto moved to the University of Chicago where she became the first tenured woman in the Department of Astronomy and Astrophysics. She also has an appointment at the Enrico Fermi Institute and the Kavli Institute for Cosmological Physics at the University of Chicago. She served as chair of the Department of Astronomy and Astrophysics from 2003 to 2006 and again from 2012 to 2017. In 2006, she received the Chair d'Excellence Award from the Agence Nationale de la Recherche and served as visiting professor in the Laboratoire d'AstroParticule et Cosmologie (APC). In 2018, she became the first female dean of the Physical Sciences Division at the University of Chicago. Olinto has given over 500 lectures worldwide and published over 250 papers. On April 1, 2024, she joined Columbia University as provost and is the Lewis Morris Rutherfurd Professor of Astronomy and Professor of Physics.

== Research ==
Throughout Olinto's career, she has made theoretical and experimental contributions to astroparticle physics, including contributions to the study of the structure of neutron stars, inflationary theory, the origin and evolution of cosmic magnetic fields, the nature of dark matter, and the origin of the highest energy cosmic particles: cosmic rays, gamma-rays, and neutrinos.

Olinto emerged as a leader of the science behind the 3,000 km^{2} Pierre Auger Observatory in Malargue, Argentina, built and operated by a 19-country collaboration. Her group pioneered in depth studies of the physics and astrophysics of ultra-high energy cosmic ray (UHECR) including the propagation and neutrino production of UHE nuclei and acceleration models based on newborn pulsars.

Starting in 2012, Olinto served as the United States principal investigator of JEM-EUSO (Extreme Universe Space Observatory on-board of the Japanese Experiment Module of the International Space Station) mission—an international collaboration involving 16 countries to discover the origin of the highest energy cosmic rays.

Olinto is the principal investigator of EUSO-SPB (Extreme Universe Space Observatory on a Super Pressure Balloon), a series of NASA super-pressure balloon missions. EUSO-SPB1 flew in April 2017 with a Fluorescence Telescope developed for JEM-EUSO. EUSO-SPB2 combines a more sensitive Fluorescence Telescope and a novel Cherenkov Telescope designed to search for up-going tau showers produced by astrophysical tau neutrinos. EUSO-SPB2 had a short flight from Wānaka, New Zealand, during the Spring 2023 campaign.

Starting in 2017, Olinto serves as principal investigator for POEMMA (Probe of Extreme Multi-Messenger Astrophysics), providing the conceptual design for the NASA space mission. The study was presented to the Astronomy and Astrophysics 2020 Decadal Survey. EUSO-SPB2 is a pathfinder for the POEMMA mission. The next project on the POEMMA development path is the POEMMA-Balloon with Radio (PBR), which is under construction to fly in a NASA superpressure balloon in 2027.

== Awards and honors ==
- Commendor of the Order of Rio Branco, Brasil 2022
- Elected to the National Academy of Sciences in 2021.
- Elected to the American Academy of Arts and Sciences in 2021.
- Elected to the Academia Brasileira de Ciências in 2021.
- Albert A. Michelson Distinguished Service Professor in the Department of Astronomy and Astrophysics and the College, The University of Chicago. (2017)
- Faculty Award for Excellence in Graduate Teaching and Mentoring, The University of Chicago. (2014-2015)
- Homer J. Livingston Professor in the Department of Astronomy and Astrophysics and the College, The University of Chicago. (2013–2016)
- Hess Lecturer of the 33rd International Cosmic Ray Conference. (2013)
- Elected Fellow of the American Association for the Advancement of Science. (2012)
- Awarded the Llewellyn John and Harriet Manchester Quantrell Award for Excellence in Undergraduate Teaching, The University of Chicago (2011)
- Awarded Chaire d'Excellence of the French Agence Nationale de la Recherche. (2006)
- Speaker Award of the Particles and Nuclei International Conference (PANIC 05). (2005)
- Convocation Speaker for the 478th Convocation at the University of Chicago. (2004)
- Elected Fellow of the American Physical Society. (2001)
- Awarded the Arthur H. Compton Lecturer, Enrico Fermi Institute, The University of Chicago. (1991)

== Personal life ==
Olinto is married to classical guitarist Sérgio Assad.
