= Music of Los Angeles =

Overview of music traditions in Los Angeles, California, United States

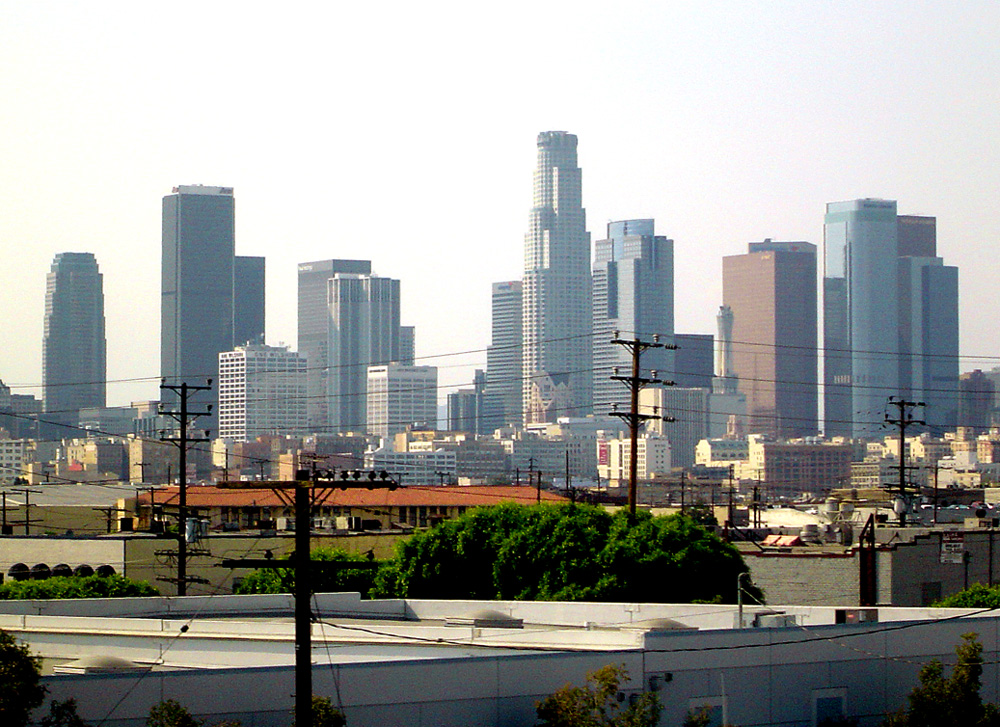
Los Angeles, California

As well as being one of the most important cities in the world in the film industry, Los Angeles, California, is also one of the most important places in the world for the recorded music industry. Many landmarks in Los Angeles – such as Capitol Records, whose headquarters resembles a stack of albums – are representative of this. A&M Records long occupied a studio off Sunset Boulevard built by Charlie Chaplin (who wrote the music for his own films). The Warner Bros. built a major recording business in addition to their film business.

== History ==
=== 1930s and 1940s ===
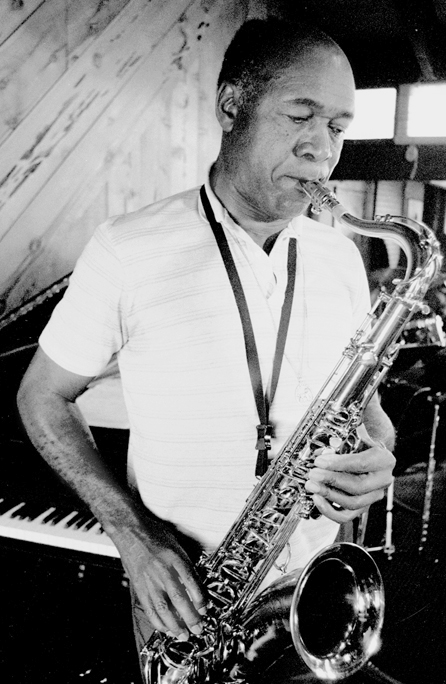
Buddy Collette

During the 1930s and 1940s Los Angeles had a vibrant African-American musical community even when it was relatively small: a number of musical artists congregated around Central Avenue, and the community produced a number of great talents, including Charles Mingus, Buddy Collette, Gerald Wilson, but in the 1950s it disappeared.

=== 1950s ===
In the 1950s Ritchie Valens was a rock and roll pioneer and a forefather of the Chicano rock movement. Valens' recording career lasted eight months, as it abruptly ended when he died in a plane crash.

=== 1960s ===
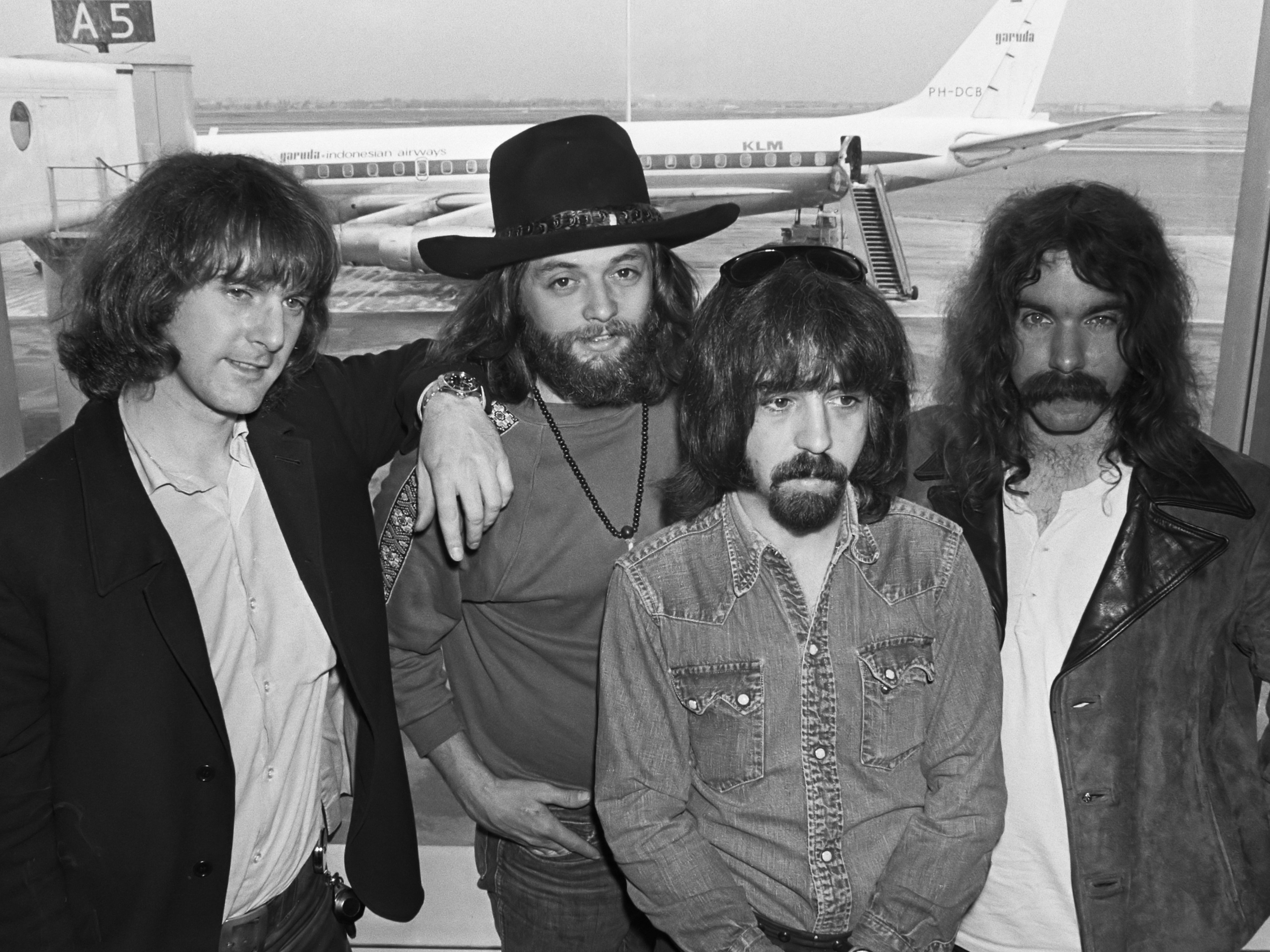
The Byrds

In the 1960s the Sunset Strip became a breeding ground for bands like The Byrds, Buffalo Springfield, Spirit, Love and The Doors. The Beach Boys were founded in nearby Hawthorne.

=== 1970s ===
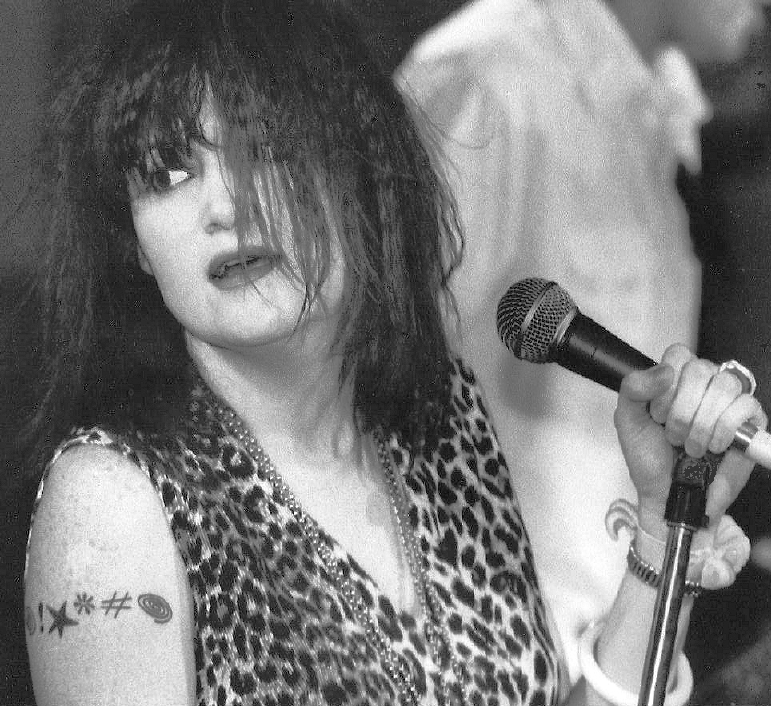
Exene Cervenka, summer 1986

In the 1970s, bands such as Toto were some of the most 'heard' bands on radio; as most of the musicians in the band were well known session musicians.

There was a sizable punk rock movement in the 1970s which spawned the hardcore punk movement featuring bands like X, Black Flag and Wasted Youth. Los Angeles' original late 1970s punk scene received less press attention than their counterparts in New York or London, but it included cult bands the Screamers, the Germs, the Weirdos, the Dils, the Bags, 45 Grave (founded by Paul B. Cutler), Nervous Gender, and X. There were also funk and R&B bands such as The Brothers Johnson, Rose Royce, The Whispers and The Sylvers.

There was also an East LA music scene that spawned bands like War, Los Lobos, The Plugz, and Los Illegals among many others.

=== 1980s ===
In the 1980s, the Paisley Underground movement was native to Los Angeles in rock music. In hard rock has come out of Los Angeles since the 1980s, including hard rockers Van Halen from nearby Pasadena; Guns N' Roses whose debut Appetite for Destruction is the best selling debut album in history; glam metal/hair metal bands like Mötley Crüe and Ratt; thrash metal acts like Metallica, Slayer, Megadeth, Suicidal Tendencies, Dark Angel and Agent Steel. In the early 1990s, many of the biggest alternative rock/metal bands such as Tool, Jane's Addiction, Rage Against the Machine and Red Hot Chili Peppers hailed from the Los Angeles area.

=== 1990s ===
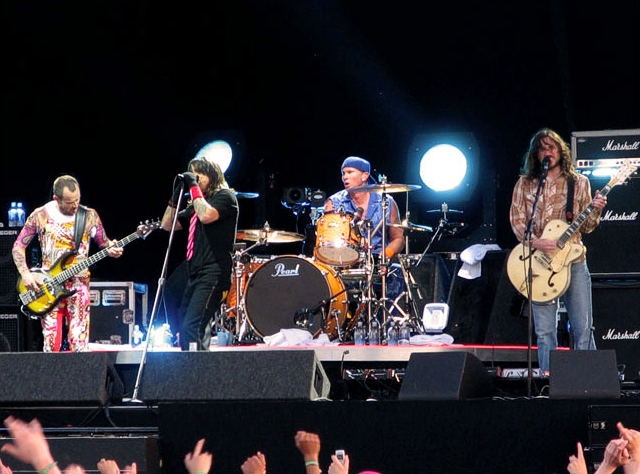
Red Hot Chili Peppers

In the mid-1990s, Los Angeles' contribution to rock music continued with artists such as Stone Temple Pilots, Elliott Smith, Beck, Weezer and Sublime of Long Beach. Hollywood Ca. made significant contributions to Alternative music in the mid-1990s with artists such as Incubus, Cool for August, and the Offspring. Also in the early to late 1990's west Coast hip-hop was making gains amongst young people with artists such as Ice-T, Coolio, Warren G, Kurupt, DJ Quik, Dr. Dre, Snoop Dogg, Eazy-E and Ice Cube amongst others.. At the end of the 1990s, the nu metal band Linkin Park was formed in Agoura, and was named after Lincoln Park in Santa Monica, near their recording studio. In addition,

In the late 1990s, indie rock artists such as Eels also rose to fame.

=== After 2000 ===
In the new millennium, the city retains its importance as a center of live rock music, rap, and of the music industry. After 2000, LA based noise rock acts like Liars, Health and No Age became famous worldwide (mainly Europe and America) touring bands. The Game became one of the most prominent voices in modern hip-hop, rising to prominence internationally in part due to a feud with New York's famous rapper 50 Cent.

The L.A. indie scene currently rides the wave through neighborhoods like Hollywood, Koreatown, Los Feliz, Silver Lake, and Echo Park, which have given rise to such bands as Silversun Pickups, Weaving the Fate, Moving Units, Rilo Kiley, Earlimart, Autolux, Scarling., Giant Drag, Icebird, Best Coast, and Local Natives. The venue The Smell became a prominent spot after 2000 where many new avant garde indie rock acts like Abe Vigoda, Anavan, Ancestors, BARR, Foot Village, Carla Bozulich, Captain Ahab, David Scott Stone, Health, Laco$te, Lavender Diamond, The Mae Shi, Mika Miko, Nite Jewel, Mellowdrone, No Age, Silver Daggers, Thrones, and Upsilon Acrux started their careersscene music subgenre developing in Los Angeles out of the emo subculture.

The rave scene and electronic music have become extremely popular in Los Angeles in the late 2000s and 2010s. Particularly house music, dubstep and drum and bass, which have all developed very strong scenes in Los Angeles. The Electric Daisy Carnival festival, which is an electronic dance music festival and had an attendance of over 185,000 people over a two-day weekend is the largest dance music festival in North America and one of the largest in the world. Other festivals such as Together As One, Monster Massive, Nocturnal and Hard Fest have had attendances of 50,000+ to 125,000+, Which makes Los Angeles the most popular location for rave in North America.

==== In the 2010s ====
In 2010, Echo Park Rising emerged as an impromptu street fair celebrating the artists, musicians and businesses of the Echo Park neighborhood, creating an open environment for the enjoyment of live music, independent art, and local business. The festival hosts multiple official stages and activities throughout the weekend located on the main routes of Sunset Blvd, Glendale Blvd, Alvarado Avenue, Echo Park Avenue, as well as informal shows at local venues and establishments. It has since been named Best Music Festival by LA Weekly. Echo Park Rising is presented by the Echo Park Chamber of Commerce and programming is curated by Spaceland Presents.

==== 2020s ====
Katseye, a girl group which debuted in 2024, is based in Los Angeles. The group was formed through the 2023 reality competition series Dream Academy, a collaboration between Hybe and Geffen Records. With members from the United States, Switzerland, the Philippines and South Korea, it has been described as a global girl group, blending stylistic traits of Western pop with the presentation attributed to K-pop.

==== Los Angeles Women's Music Festival ====
The Los Angeles Women's Music Festival was a summer music festival that featured exclusively female solo artists and female-led bands. The official theme of the festival was Females on Fire. The event took place on Saturday, August 25, 2007.

Los Angeles based female musicians Gayle Day, Miria (singer), Gilli Moon and Toni Koch, in partnership with Warrior Girl Music, SheJay, and Adventure Art Entertainment, produced the first women's music festival in Los Angeles. Inspired by Lilith Fair and held at Woodley Park, home of WorldFest (LA), Los Angeles' largest Earth Day festival, the Los Angeles Women's Music Festival was an eco-music-fest featuring over 65 bands on 5 solar-powered stages, offering vegan, vegetarian and organic refreshments, and featuring pet adoptions, and was attended by over 2500 people. The Los Angeles Women's Music Festival also donated a percentage of proceeds to Los Angeles animal rescue groups. The festival was started in 2007 as an annual festival but was on hiatus during 2008 and was scheduled to return in 2009, although the latter event never materialized. As of 2015, it is on indefinite hiatus due to financial challenges.

Some of the performers at the festival included:

- Klymaxx
- Sophie B. Hawkins
- BETTY (band)
- Patrice Pike
- SONiA of Disappear Fear
- Janet Robin
- Los Abandoned
- Gayle Day
- Gilli Moon
- Miria (singer)
- Kristy Hanson

== Historic music venues ==
=== Within the city proper ===
- Los Angeles Music Center
- The Hollywood Bowl
- The Greek Theater
- The Wiltern

=== Within the megacity ===
- The Forum in Inglewood, California
- The Majestic Ventura Theatre in Ventura, California

== See also ==
- Culture of Los Angeles
- Arts and culture of Los Angeles
- History of Los Angeles, California
- List of bands from Los Angeles
- Los Angeles Master Chorale
- Los Angeles Opera
- Music of California
- Rhythm and Blues
- Smooth Jazz
- West Coast hip hop
- Chicano rap
