= Cynthia Clarey =

American operatic singer (born 1949)

- Born: April 25, 1949 (age 77); Smithfield, Virginia, U.S.
- Occupations: Opera singer (soprano, mezzo-soprano), educator

Cynthia Clarey (born April 25, 1949) is an American operatic singer and educator. In opera, she has sung both soprano and mezzo-soprano roles and is often associated with the role of Carmen.

== Early life ==
Clarey was born in Smithfield, Virginia. At the age of ten she moved with her family to Rocky Mount, North Carolina. As a child, Clarey sang in choirs for her school and the family's church.

=== Education ===
After graduating from high school in 1966, Clarey went to Howard University in Washington, D.C. to study music. She earned her bachelor of music degree in 1970. Clarey then enrolled at the Juilliard School in New York City. She initially intended to pursue a career in musical theater, not opera, leading to Clarey walking out of a master class with opera singer Maria Callas when questioned on the matter. Despite this conflict with the school faculty, Clarey continued at the school and earned a postgraduate diploma in 1972.

== Career ==
=== Opera ===
Clarey made her debut with the American Opera Center singing the role of Pamina in Mozart's Magic Flute. She worked professionally as a chorister in New York City for a time, singing for shows like Carmina Burana and the Alvin Ailey Dance Company's Revelations. In these early years as an African-American performer, Clarey recalls incidents of racial prejudice, including a time when a director wanted to remove a black chorister from a scene because "she did not look authentic to Mozart."

Clarey then moved to Binghamton, New York and joined the Tri-Cities Opera Company. This is where Clarey first sang the character of "Carmen, a Gypsy Girl" in Georges Bizet's opera Carmen. Carmen became a signature role for Clarey, and she went on to perform it across the United States and globally.

In 1984 Clarey made her European operatic debut singing in L'incoronazione di Poppea at the Glyndebourne Festival. Two years later, she returned to Glyndenbourne in Porgy and Bess as Serena. Clarey later spoke of the challenging nature of this role. She expressed respect and admiration for early African-American opera singer Ruby Elzy, who originated the role in 1935 with a demanding weekly performance schedule. "Serena's music is so difficult to sing," Clarey said, "and when you have to act the role too it's overwhelming. ... I can't imagine having to do a role and an opera this difficult, and then have to perform in them eight times a week".

Clarey is featured on a recording of the Glyndenbourne cast of Porgy and Bess, with Simon Rattle conducting the London Philharmonic. This 1989 release was nominated for a Grammy Award and is considered one of the best classically oriented recordings of the opera.

Clarey also performed with the Royal Opera House in London, the Opéra-Comique (Paris), the Deutsche Oper Berlin, the Bayerische Staatsoper (Bavarian State Opera, Munich), the Teatro Municipale (Reggio Emilia), the Teatro Real (Madrid), the Theatro Municipal (Rio de Janeiro), the Teatro Nacional de Sao Carlos, the Toronto Opera and the CAPAB Opera (Cape Town). She has performed for numerous opera festivals including the Wexford Festival Opera, the Aix-en-Provence Festival and the Bregenz Festival.

=== Concert performance ===
In addition to opera, Clarey has established herself as a concert performer. She has sung with major orchestras such as the Chicago Symphony, the BBC Symphony Orchestra, the Boston Symphony, the Toronto Symphony, the Royal Scottish National Orchestra, the Berlin Philharmonic, the Vienna Philharmonic, the Los Angeles Philharmonic, and the New York Philharmonic.

As her voice matured with age, Clarey found that her vocal range had dropped "about an octave." After quitting singing for a bit, she moved to Chicago and discovered cabaret. She began performing in the cabaret style, saying, "Opera is more technically difficult for a singer, but cabaret is up close and personal. There’s nowhere to hide! ... It really feels like home".

=== Music education ===
Clarey joined the Roosevelt University faculty in 2008, teaching voice and performance at the Chicago College of Performing Arts there. She has also been a guest professor at Indiana University Bloomington.
