= Gayle Day =

Gayle Davidson is British, Los Angeles-based, singer-songwriter. She is also one of the co-producers and directors of the Los Angeles Women's Music Festival.

== Overview ==
Day has released two albums, Freedom Paradise and Beautiful Dangerous, and placed music on numerous television programmes including most recently The Hills. She is also a co-founder of LaLa Music. and runs the Day/Lee Show with fellow expatriate Eileen Lee.

In 2007, Gayle and Miria, with Gilli Moon's Warrior Girl Music, co-produced the Los Angeles Women's Music Festival, the first festival of its kind in the Los Angeles area.

In addition to being a producer and performer at the first Los Angeles Women's Music Festival, Day was pregnant during the Festival, and gave birth to a daughter in May 2008.
