= Sérgio Assad =

Brazilian guitarist, composer, and arranger

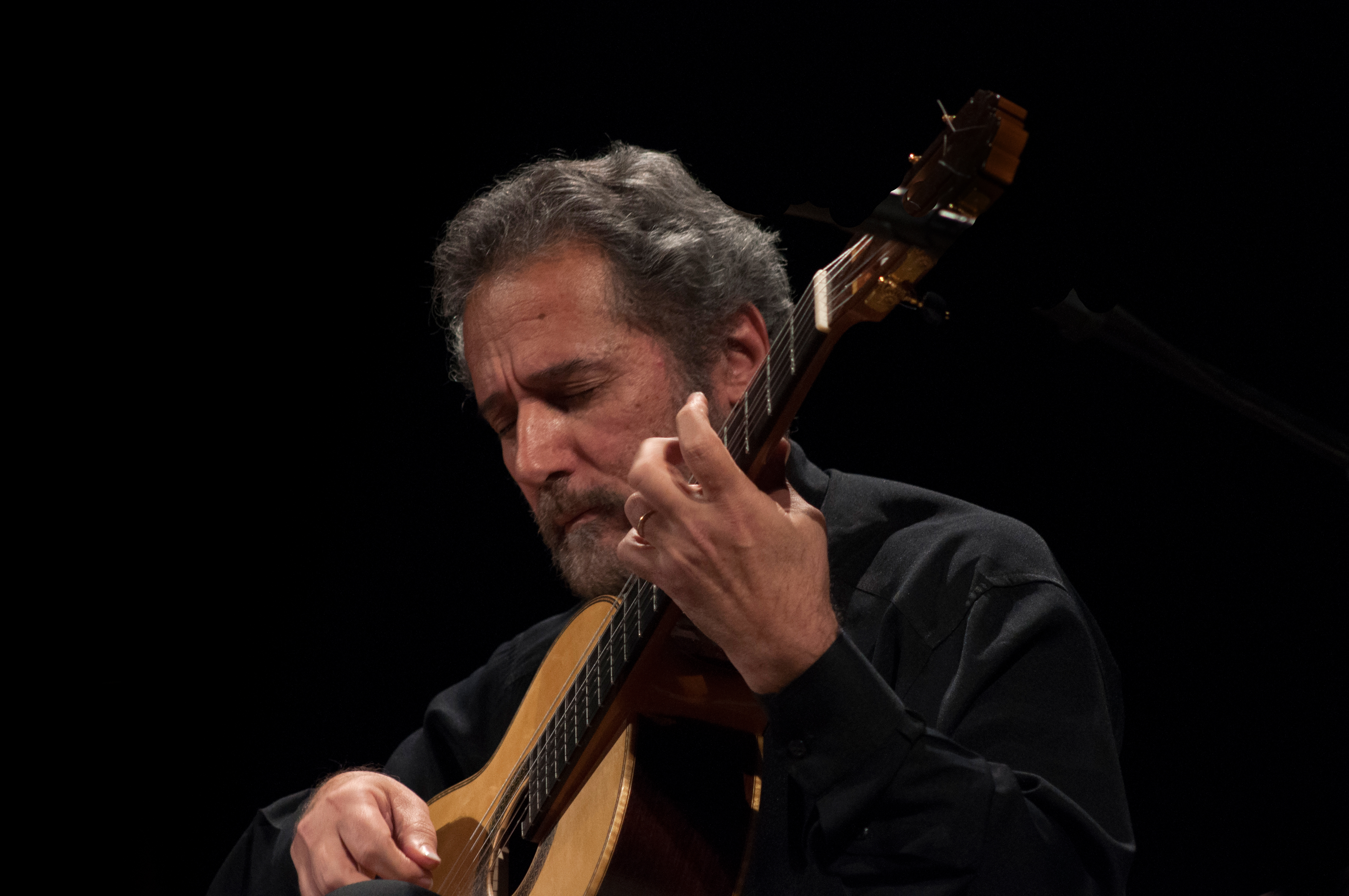
- Assad performing in July 2012

Background information
- Born: 26 December 1952 (age 73); Mococa, Brazil
- Genres: Classical
- Occupations: Guitarist, composer, arranger, teacher
- Instrument: Guitar
- Years active: fl. ca. 1966–present
- Label: Nonesuch/Elektra Records
- Website: https://assadbrothers.com

Sérgio Assad (born 26 December 1952) is a Brazilian guitarist, composer, and arranger who often performs with his brother, Odair, in the guitar duo Sérgio and Odair Assad, commonly referred to as the Assad Brothers or Duo Assad. Their younger sister Badi is also a guitarist. Assad is the father of composer/singer/pianist Clarice Assad. He is married to Angela Olinto.

== Biography ==
Born into a musical family in Mococa, São Paulo, Brazil, Assad began creating music for the guitar not long after he began playing the instrument. He learned Brazilian folk melodies from his father. By age 14, he was arranging and writing original compositions for the guitar duo he had formed with his brother, Odair. At the age of 17, he and Odair began their studies under the best known classical guitar teacher in Brazil at the time, Monina Tavora, a former disciple of Andrés Segovia. Sergio later went on to study conducting and composition at the Escola Nacional de Música in Rio de Janeiro, and worked privately with Brazilian composition teacher, Esther Scliar. He is the spouse of the physicist Angela Olinto.

== Arrangements ==
Over the last twenty years Assad has concentrated most of his efforts on building a repertoire for the guitar duo. He has extended the possibilities of the two-guitar combination through his arrangements of Latin American music by composers such as Piazzolla, Villa-Lobos, and Ginastera as well as Baroque to Modern music by Scarlatti, Rameau, Soler, Bach, Mompou, Ravel, Debussy, and Gershwin among others. He has completed over 300 arrangements for different chamber music settings arrangements for Gidon Kremer, Dawn Upshaw, Yo Yo Ma, Nadja Salerno-Sonnenberg, TrioConBrio, Iwao Furusawa, Paquito D'Rivera, Turtle Island String Quartet, L.A. Quartet, Luciana Souza, and Vancouver Cantata Singers.

== Composition ==
As a composer Assad has completed more than fifty works for guitar, many of which have become standards in the guitar repertoire. His "Aquarelle" for solo guitar was chosen as the required contemporary work for the 2002 Guitar Foundation of America Competition in Miami. In 2007, he wrote the set piece for the 2008 Guitar Foundation of America Competition named "Valsa de Outono". Assad's orchestral compositions include the ballet "Scarecrow", the concerto "Mikis" for guitar and strings, "Fantasia Carioca" for two guitars which he and Odair premiered with the Saint Paul Chamber Orchestra in 1998, "Interchange", a concerto for guitar quartet and orchestra premiered by the Los Angeles Guitar Quartet with the San Antonio Symphony in 2009, the concerto "Originis" for violin, guitar duo, and orchestra recorded live with the Orquestra Sinfônica do Estado de São Paulo, and the concerto "Phases" for guitar duo and orchestra premiered in 2011 by the Seattle Symphony Orchestra with the Assad Brothers as soloists.

== Teaching ==
Assad has taught master classes in conservatories, universities, and music schools in the US, Europe, Latin America, Japan, and Australia. From 1994 to 1996, he taught at the Conservatoire Royal de Musique in Mons, near Brussels, and from 2003 to 2006 at the Chicago College of Performing Arts at Roosevelt University. He is currently on faculty at the San Francisco Conservatory of Music.

== Collaborations ==
The Assad Brothers have collaborated in performance and recordings with classical artists Gidon Kremer, Yo-Yo Ma, Dawn Upshaw, Nadja Salerno-Sonnenberg, the Turtle island Quartet and Paquito D’Rivera. The collaboration with Salerno-Sonnenberg inspired Sergio to write the triple concerto "Originis" for violin, two guitars and chamber orchestra. This piece celebrates the respective Italian and Brazilian roots of Nadja Salerno-Sonnenberg and the Assad Duo and has been performed with the New Jersey Symphony Orchestra, Seattle Symphony, and the Saint Paul Chamber Orchestra among others and recorded live in São Paulo, Brazil with the Orquestra Sinfônica do Estado de São Paulo. This recording has been released by Allegro Classical in 2009.

== Awards ==
- 2022 - "Anido's Portrait" - Latin Grammy Award for Best Contemporary Classical Composition, recorded by Berta Rojas on Album "Legado" (Latin Grammy Award for Best Classical Album)
- 2021 - "Archetypes" Grammy nominations for Best Chamber Music/Small Ensemble Performance; Best Contemporary Classical Composition; and Best Engineered Album - collaboration with Clarice Assad and the Third Coast Percussion
- 2012 - Honorary Degree - Doctor of Music - University of Arizona
- 2010 - "Interchange", a concerto for guitar quartet and orchestra, was nominated for the Best Classical Contemporary Composition at the 11th Latin Grammy Awards.
- 2010 - "Maracaípe", a piece for guitar duo, was nominated for the Best Classical Contemporary Composition at the 11th Latin Grammy Awards.
- 2008 - His compositions for two guitars, "Tahhiyya Li Ossoulina", received a Latin Grammy award as best contemporary composition.
- 2002 - The album "Sérgio and Odair Assad Play Piazzolla" received a Latin Grammy award for best Tango album.
- 1973 – Winner of Competition for young soloists – the Brazilian Symphony Orchestra.
- 1979 - Winner of The Rostrum for Young Interpreters in The International Music Competition of Bratislava (former Czechoslovakia)

== List of works ==
- Três Cenas Brasileiras (1984) Two guitars (Éditions Henry Lemoine) Pinote, Vitoria Regia, Recife dos corais (Nonesuch 1984)
- Suite Brasileira (1986) Two guitars (Ascap) Baião, Canção e Samba (Nonesuch 1988)
- Aquarelle (1986) Solo guitar (Editions Henry Lemoine) Divertimento, Valseana, Preludio e Toccatina (mandatory piece for the GFA competition 2002)
- Children's Cradle (1992) Solo guitar (Sergio Assad Music) Berceuse, Dreams, Morning’s Rag (recorded by Ricardo Cobo)
- Saga dos Migrantes Two guitars (Sergio Assad Music) Retirantes, Trem da Ilusâo, Metropolis, Saudades, Dança Antagonica (Nonesuch 1992)
- Giornata a Nettuno (1993) Guitar ensemble (Vogt&Fritz, Germany)
- Fantasia Carioca (1994) Solo guitar (Sergio Assad Music)
- Suite “Summer Garden” (1994) Two guitars (Gendai Magazine) Opening, Summer Garden, Farewell, The Friends, Unbalanced, Train of Thoughts, First Encounter, The Old Man, Walk on a Bridge, The Morgue, Invitation, The Well, Water Frenzy, Watermelon, Helping Hands, Rain Storm, Remembrance, A search, Dreams, Passage, Butterflies (GHA, Sony Classics)
- Winter Impressions (1996) Flute, Viola and Guitar (Edition Henry Lemoine) The Frozen Garden, Blue Solitude, Fire Place (composed for TrioConBrio, dedicated to Andrea Foerderreuther, recorded on "Impressions", Koch Discover International). Premiered at Nuertingen International Guitar Festival 1996 by TrioConBrio.
- Círculo Mágico (1997) Flute and Guitar (E.H Lemoine, France)
- Uarekena (1997) Guitar Quartet (E.Lemoine)
- Fantasia Carioca bis (1998) two guitars and chamber orchestra (Ascap) premiered in 1998 with the Saint Paul Orchestra conducted by John Adams
- Sonata (1999) solo guitar (Gendai Magazine) Allegro Moderato, Andante, Presto ( recorded by Shin-Ichi Fukuda)
- Jobiniana n 1 (1986) Two guitars (Edition H Lemoine, France)
- Jobiniana n 2 (1988) Flute and guitar( (E. HL.)
- Jobiniana n 3 (1996) Solo guitar (E.HL) (rec by Shin Ichi Fukuda)
- Jobiniana n 4 (2001) Cello and guitar (rec by Shin Ichi Fukuda)
- Espantalho (Ballet) (1998) Chamber Orchestra (Sergio Assad Music) premiered by the Municipal Symphony Orchestra of São Paulo, Brazil
- Mikis Concerto Fantasia) (1999) Solo guitar and String Orchestra (premiered in Athens by Costas Cotsiolis and the Athenian String Orchestra) Allegro, Andante, Vivace
- The Chase (1996) Two guitars (Nonesuch)
- Pieces for violin and two guitars (1996) (Nonesuch) Andalucia Fantasy on Dark Eyes Istambul (Awakening, Turkish Dance) Tatras Gypsy Songs Vardar's Boat Variations on Django's Nuages.
- Pieces for Clarinet and Guitar (1998) (Egea, Italy) Un abbraccio a Joao Menino Grumari Violetas Azuis Champ Velho Retrato Hopscotch Mangabeira Angela
- Campusca (1996) Two guitars (Sergio Assad Music)
- Eterna (1996) Two guitars (Sergio Assad Music)
- Menino (2003) Cello and two guitars. (rec by Yo Yo Ma Sony)
- Menino (2003) Flute, viola and guitar (rec by trio con brio)
- Three Greek letters (2000) Solo guitar (Editions Henry Lemoine) Psi Pi Sigma
- Concerto Originis (2001) Triple concerto for violin, two guitar and chamber Orchestra. ( premiered with the Ssint Paul Orchestra)
- 3 Divertimentos (2002) Solo guitar (GSP) Abaete Arpoador Parati
- 5 World Dances (2002) Guitar and string quartet (Sergio Assad Music) Middle Eastern, Celtic, African, Balkan, Latin American
- Eli's Portrait (2004) Solo guitar (Sergio Assad Music)
- Itaipava (2006) Flute, violin, clarinet, cello, piano (Sergio Assad Music)
- Tahhiyya Li Ossoulina (2006) Two guitars (Sergio Assad Music)
- Trois Brésiliens à Saint Paul (2007) Guitar ensemble (Sergio Assad Music) Le naïf, La joyeuse, Le reveur, Rencontre a Tricastin
- Piatã (2007) Choir and two guitars (Sergio Assad Music)
- Alvorada Tropical (2007) 4 Guitars (commissioned by the EOS guitar Quartet)
- Sinceridade (2007) 4 guitars (written for Maogani Guitar Quartet)
- Interchange (2008) Concerto for Four Guitars and Orchestra (Editions Doberman) (commissioned by the San Antonio Guitar Festival. Written for the LAGQ) Sephardic Passage Gypsy Slopes, Pacific Overlook, Forroblues Detour, Crossings
- Valsa de Outono (2008) for solo guitar (commissioned by the GFA in San Francisco, CA; Editions Doberman)
- Familia (2008) Song for the Assad Family (written for the album songs of joy and peace by YoYo Ma)
- 6 Brevidades (2009) for solo guitar (Written for Odair Assad; Editions Doberman) Tarde, Chuva, Feliz, Ginga, Cantiga, Saltitante
- Maracaípe (2009) for two Guitars (commissioned by Chia Teng/ Theresa Lee. Written for Sue Wang Duo) Wistful Rider Crab walk
- The Enchanted Island (2009) for Guitar Trio (commissioned by Manuel Barrueco and The Beijing Guitar Duo)
- Suite “Back to Our Roots” (2010) with Clarice Assad For voice, piano, guitar and sazouki Leaving Hope Nostalgia Happiness
- Suite Brasileira II (2010) for Guitar Trio (commissioned by Andrew Zohn and Columbus State University, GA)
- Phases (2010) Concerto for two guitars and Orchestra (premiered with the Seattle Symphony in January 2011) Recollections Old Portrait Ressurgence
- Central do Brasil (2010) for guitar and string quartet (written for Jose Paulo Becker and the Quarteto Radames Ganattali)
- Impressiones Ibéricas (2011) for solo guitar (commissioned by Raphael Aguirre) Asturiana, Catalana, Andaluza,
- Sandy's Portrait (2012) for solo guitar (dedicated to Sandy Boltom)
- Concerto Popular do Rio (2013) for guitar and orchestra (dedicated to Pablo Villegas)
- Kindergarten (2013) for guitar trio (dedicated to the Mobius Trio)
- Alphalt Jungle (2013) for percussion ensemble.
- Suite Brasileira III(2014) for solo guitar.(dedicated to Thomas Viloteau)
- Suite Brasileira IV (2015) for solo guitar (dedicated to Paulo Martelli)
- Suite Brasileira V (2015) for solo guitar (dedicated to Alec O'Leary)
- Homage a Julian Arcas (2015) for solo guitar
- Imbricatta (2015) for solo guitar (dedicated to Marc Teicholz)
- Anido's Portrait (2015) for solo guitar (commissioned by Berta Rojas)
- Sonhos e Memorias (2016) for English Horn and Orchestra.
- Sun Wukong's Toccata (2016) for solo guitar (dedicated to Sue Meng)
- Shadows and Light (2016)for solo guitar (dedicated to David Tanenbaum)
- Variaciones sobre un estudio de F. Sor (2016) for solo guitar
- Suite One Week in Rio (2016) for guitar duo (dedicated to Woch&Guzik Duo)
- Variations on a Lullaby (2016) for two guitars and voice. (dedicated to the One Great City Duo)
- One 4 All 4 one (2016) For four guitars ( dedicated to the Quatuor Eclisses)
- David's Portrait (2017) for solo guitar (dedicated to David Russell)
- Yesterday's Tomorrow (2017) for Choir and Guitar Quartet.
- Quadros do Brasil (2017) Concerto for Cello and Orchestra. (dedicated to YoYo Ma)
- The Walls (2018) for guitar and guitar orchestra. (Commissioned by Bill Kanengiser and by Thomas Offermann on behalf of the "Bonner Meisterkonzerte Klassische Gitarre (BMKG)". Premiered in Bonn on April 22, 2018 on the occasion of the 25th anniversary of the BMKG with Aniello Desiderio (guitar), Thomas Offermann (conductor) and the ensemble of the HMT Rostock and the International Guitar Academy Berlin. Dedicated to Bill Kanengiser and Aniello Desiderio.)
- 12 Coloquial Preludes for solo guitar (2018) (dedicated to Ricardo Gallen)
- Seikilos Epitaph's Fantasy for solo guitar (2018) (dedicated to Thanos Mitsalas)

== Discography ==
- Latino America, recorded with the Armorial Orchestra (1974) Continental 1-035-404-006.
- International Rostrum of Young Performers (1979) Opus 9110041/2. 2-LP set including various performers. Assads play Domenico Scarlatti, Villa-Lobos and ? Petit.
- Complete Villa-Lobos works for solo guitar (1978) Kuarup Discos KLP 003/4
- Os Choros de Camera (1980) Kuarup MKCD-002. Sergio plays Choro No. 1.
- Musica Nova do Brasil (solo recording by Sérgio) (1981) Funarte/Promemus MMB 81.022. This CD can be heard at Funarte's web site.
- Marlos Nobre/Yanomani (1983) EMI-Odeon 31 C 0634422921
- Gnattali, Rodrigo, Piazzolla (1984, CD released in 1983) GHA #126021
- Latin American Music for Two Guitars (1985, re-released 1993) Nonesuch/Elektra 79116
- Concert at the "Y" (February 3, 1983) Free cassette distributed to subscribers of Guitar Review. Recorded live at the YMCA, New York City, NY.
- Alma Brasileira (recorded November, 1987, Kruiskerk, Bergum, The Netherlands, re-released 1993) Nonesuch/Elektra 79179
- Violões: Projeto Memoria Brasileira (1989) Crescente CR 0009 (Brazil). The Duo plays Egberto Gismonti's Baião Malandro on this live album.
- Two Concertos for Two Guitars (1991) GHA #126018
- Play Rameau/Scarlatti/Couperin/Bach (1993) Nonesuch/Elektra #79292
- Natsu no Niwa Suite (1994) GHA #126029
- Dawn Upshaw White Moon: Songs to Morpheus (1995) Nonesuch/Elektra 79364. The Assads are on tracks 3, 6, and 12.
- Saga Dos Migrantes (1996) Nonesuch/Elektra 79365.
- Gidon Kremer El Tango (1997) Nonesuch/Elektra 79462. the music of Ástor Piazzolla. The duo accompanies on tracks 1 and 10.
- Yo Yo Ma Soul of the Tango (1997) Sony Classical/SME SK 63122.; the Assads play Piazzolla's Tango Suite.
- Fuga y misterio (1998) GHA #126027. NOTE: This album is by Odair Assad. Odair, Sérgio, cellist Edmond Carlier, and violinist Fernando Suarez Paz play works by Piazzolla, ? Lucky, and Gnattali.
- Velho Retrato (1999) EGEA Edizioni Discografiche SCA 068. NOTE: This is an album of duets between Sérgio and Gabrielle Mirabassi (clarinet). All compositions are by Sérgio except one by his daughter Clarice.
- Nadja Salerno-Sonnenberg Sérgio and Odair Assad (2000) Nonesuch/Elektra 79505.
- Sérgio and Odair Assad Play Piazzolla (2001) Nonesuch/Elektra 79632.
- Concierto de Volos - Concierto de Aranjuez - Serenade opus 50 (2002) GHA 126.025. NOTE: This album is of the Orquestra de Cordoba, conducted by Leo Brouwer. Odair is the soloist on Malcolm Arnold's Serenade opus 50.
- Yo Yo Ma Obrigado, Brazil (2003) Sony Classical/SME SK 89935; the Assads play on Sérgio's arrangement of the Villa-Lobos tune "A Lenda do Caboclo" and on Sérgio's piece "Menino".
- Yo Yo Ma Obrigado, Brazil Live in Concert (2004) Sony Classical/SME SK 90970.; the Assads play on seven of the 14 tracks.
- Live in Brussels (2004) GHA 126.055. Features compositions by Bittencourt, Carlos Gardel, Juan Carlos Cobián, Astor Piazzolla, Egberto Gismonti, Pixinguinha, Charlie Chaplin.
- Three Double Concertos (2000) GHA 126.046. NOTE: Sérgio and Odair are the soloists on Edino Krieger's "Concierto para dois violóes e cordas."
- Sérgio and Odair Assad and their Family: A Brazilian Songbook (2005) GHA 126.058.
- Jardim Abandonado (2008) Nonesuch/Elektra 79971
- Originis (2009) NSS Music CD-NSS-07. NOTE: Recorded live in São Paulo with the Orquestra Sinfonica de São Paulo with Nadja Salerno-Sonnenberg.

== Reviews ==
“They aren’t just soloists but a two-man, multi voice band of soloists who play instinctively well together, with consistent rhythmic intuition and soul.” - The Los Angeles Times

“The Brazilian-born Assad brothers…perform with almost telepathic unity” – The Boston Globe

“… the best two-guitar team in existence, maybe even in history… no amount of anticipation could have prepared me for the Brazilian brothers’ daringly flexible, eerily unanimous ensemble playing – it was as if they could see inside each other's heads.” - The Washington Post

“Throughout the concert, the brothers played as one… This was two persons, four hands, one mind.” – Seattle Post-Intelligencer

“A kind of wizardry lies within the playing of Sergio and Odair Assad… they produce a supple, flawless unified sound.” – The New York Times

“…Sergio and Odair, two of the finest guitarists on the planet.” – Journal Sentinel

“…it’s not hard to imagine that acoustic guitar music, when in the hands of masters like Sergio and Odair Assad, is a musical window into the heart.”- The New Jersey Star- Ledger

“Because they have been performing together for most of their lives, and because they play from memory, there is a lively interaction between them that creates the impression that they are improvising like a couple of virtuosic, perhaps even telepathic, jazz players” – The New York Times

== See also ==
- Latin Grammy Awards
