= Miria (singer) =

American singer-songwriter

Miria is a Los Angeles-based singer-songwriter. She is also one of the co-producers and directors of the Los Angeles Women's Music Festival.

== Overview ==
Los Angeles based singer-songwriter Miria has released the album, Under the Surface and several singles. Her song Break Your Heart, from her album, won second place in the DBSA Facing Us 2008 Song Contest, Her song, Lullabye of Mars, won second place at the 2004 Mars Society Roget de Lisle song contest.

In 2007 Miria and Gayle Day, with Gilli Moon's Warrior Girl Music, co-produced the Los Angeles Women's Music Festival, the first festival of its kind in the Los Angeles area.

== Trivia ==
In addition to being a singer-songwriter, Miria is also a UI/UX Designer and former employee of the Free Software Foundation. She also performed at the Car Talk anniversary show as a member of the Museum School Cheerleaders.
