= Chicago College of Performing Arts =

Division of Roosevelt University in Illinois, US

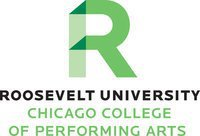
- Logo for Chicago College of Performing Arts; (Roosevelt University)
- Former names: College of Performing Arts; Chicago Musical College; Chicago Academy of Music
- Type: Conservatory
- Parent institution: Roosevelt University
- Location: 42.054°N 88.04°W
- Website: www.roosevelt.edu/colleges/ccpa

The Chicago College of Performing Arts is the performing arts college of Roosevelt University in Chicago, Illinois, United States. It comprises three conservatories: the Music Conservatory, the Interdisciplinary Conservatory, and the Theatre Conservatory.

Nearly 600 students come from more than 40 states and 25 countries to study at the college. Its faculty consists primarily of world class professional actors, directors, performers, and musicians, including nearly 30 members of the Chicago Symphony Orchestra and the Lyric Opera of Chicago (half of whom are principals) and theatre performers with credits from Broadway to Chicago and the West Coast.

== History ==
Chicago Musical College was founded in 1867, less than four decades after the city of Chicago was incorporated. It has given over a hundred years of uninterrupted service to music and music education and has played an important role in the development of the cultural life of the Midwest.

In 1865, after initial efforts to establish a college of music, the Chicago Conservatorium of Music was founded, with Florenz Ziegfeld, Sr. as its director. (Ziegfeld Sr. was the father of Florenz, Jr., who is better known as a successful and trail-blazing Broadway impresario.)

Two years later, in 1867, Ziegfeld established his own Chicago Academy of Music, the fourth conservatory in America. In 1871, the conservatory moved to a new building which was destroyed only a few weeks later by the Great Chicago Fire; despite the conflagration, the College was again up and running by the end of the year.

In 1872, the school changed its name to Chicago Musical College; over 900 students were enrolled in that year. A Normal Teachers' Institute was added to the school's offerings. Tuition in those far-off days cost an average of one dollar per lesson. Four years later the State of Illinois accredited the College as a degree granting institution of higher learning. A Preparatory Division was opened which established branches throughout the city.

Rudolph Ganz joined Chicago Musical College's faculty in 1900 and, except for a brief hiatus in the 1920s, remained associated with the school until his death in 1972. In 1917, the school offered a master of music degree, and seven years later the school became a charter member of the National Association of Schools of Music.

By 1925, the college moved into its own eleven-story building at 64 E. Van Buren Street. One hundred and twenty-five names appeared on the faculty roster for that year, and the school opened three dormitory floors for students. In 1936, the school was admitted as a full member to the North Central Association of Colleges and Secondary Schools, the only independent music college in the Midwest to enjoy such status. By 1947 the college was offering doctorates in fine arts and music education.

In 1954, the school merged with Roosevelt University's School of Music which was founded in 1945. The name "Chicago Musical College" was retained for the new college which was created by the union of the two schools. All operations moved to join the University in the now national landmark Auditorium Building at 430 South Michigan Avenue in Chicago's Loop. The building houses one of the finest auditoriums in the world, in addition to the Rudolph Ganz Memorial Recital Hall.

In the fall of 1997, Roosevelt established a College of Performing Arts which joined Chicago Musical College and the Theater Program under one administrative unit. In 2000, under the leadership of new dean James Gandre, the name was changed to Chicago College of Performing Arts. Rudy Marcozzi acted as Interim Dean during the 2008-2009 school year until Henry Fogel, the former President of the Chicago Symphony, assumed the post of dean of the college in the Fall of 2009. Linda Berna is the associate dean/director of the Music Conservatory, and Ray Frewen is the associate dean/director of the Theatre Conservatory. In July 2023, Dr. Kevin Hampton was appointed Dean of the conservatory.

== Ganz Hall ==
Ganz Hall was originally conceived as a banquet hall for the Auditorium Hotel after the building had already been constructed in 1890. Louis Sullivan, the architect of the building, was faced with trying to build a new large space within the world's largest mixed-use high-rise building. The only area available for constructing a room for banqueting was above the Auditorium Theatre.

The two primary innovations of the project were to design a special support system for a two-story structure and bring about a refined space capable of formal dining. First, Sullivan worked closely with his partner and structural engineer, Dankmar Adler, to develop a system of iron trusses. The entire frame of the building was constructed to span across the top of the Theatre similar to the long spans of bridge design. This was the first innovation of the project.

The Banquet Hall, entered from the seventh floor of the hotel, is a fine example of the refinement of the ornamentation, the second innovation. Sullivan used a unique and distinctive system of ornamentation such as carved wood panels and capitals, stenciled wall patterns, elaborate plaster work, gilded lighting fixtures, and the use of Michigan birch and gold leaf - all of which made the interior striking. A young apprentice working for Sullivan, Frank Lloyd Wright, had obtained much responsibility at the time and designed some of the ornament.

The ornament is quite intricate and well-developed. The columns are large tapered-over scaled piers with rounded corners from which the ornament "appears" from the grain of the wood. The piers were a modern expression of the time because Sullivan stripped away all the traditional Victorian details in lieu of a simple oversized design.

== Alterations ==
Around 1912, the Banquet Hall was used as a Masonic Lodge. The Masons made several alterations. The musicians' gallery at the north end of the hall was removed. A balcony was installed at the rear of the hall. They also sealed the center pair of doors, removed three of the stained glass windows, and painted the remaining windows black. The stencils were painted over and acoustical tiles were applied to the face of the beams.

In 1956, Chicago Musical College of Roosevelt University obtained the Hall. Many of the Masons' alterations were eliminated and the Hall was restored and converted to a recital hall. Under the direction of architect Crombie Taylor, the goal of restoring the room as closely as possible to the original ornamentation while providing an attractive hall for music recitals was begun. A stage and fixed theatre seating were installed to achieve this function. The majority of stencil patterns were recovered. Today, reproductions of the stencils remain on the back wall and in one of the arches as originally designed by Sullivan. However, some of the work that was planned, such as the stenciling on the beams and walls, and installing the ornamental light fixtures, was not completed at that time.

In 1980, architect John Vinci completed a project that helped control the environmental effects on the hall. A new roof and exterior wall system were installed along with new windows and skylights. Water that had been seeping into the Hall was eliminated. This was the beginning of keeping the Hall intact without further damage.

Work continues to restore the hall to its former splendor and provide adequately for use of the space as a recital hall. In 2001, the paintings lining the walls were removed and restored at the Art Institute of Chicago. In the fall of 2002 the "electroliers" were recreated and installed, as well as a new HVAC system.

== Faculty ==
The faculty consists of many musicians from the Chicago Symphony Orchestra and the Chicago Lyric Opera, as well as other musicians from around the world. Current instrumental faculty include: Tanya Carey, Richard Hirschl, Teng Li (principal violist of the Chicago Symphony), Russell Rolen (co-founder of Spektral Quartet), John Sharp (principal cellist of the Chicago Symphony), An Tran (classical guitar), and Paul Wertico. Voice and opera faculty include Dr. Dana Brown, Scott Gilmore, Allan Glassman, Bruce Hall, Jonita Lattimore, and Thomas Studebaker. Faculty of the composition program have included Stacy Garrop, Kyong Mee Choi, and Daron Hagen.

Notable former faculty include: Shmuel Ashkenasi, Nicole Cabell, Robert Chen (concertmaster of the Chicago Symphony), Cynthia Clarey, Dale Clevenger (former principal horn of the Chicago Symphony), Vadim Gluzman, Judith Haddon, Michael Holmes, Vadim Karpinos (percussionist in the Chicago Symphony Orchestra), Ed Harrison (timpanist of the Lyric Opera of Chicago), Eugene Izotov (former principal oboe of the Chicago Symphony), Samuel Ramey, David Schrader, Richard Stillwell, Wendy Warner, and Liu Yang.

== Notable alumni ==
- Anthony Braxton: musician and composer
- Eddie Harris: jazz musician, saxophonist
- Ramsey Lewis: jazz musician, host of Legends of Jazz and The Ramsey Lewis Morning Show, WNUA radio
- Danitra Vance: comedian (The Second City, Saturday Night Live) and actress
- Amy Beth Kirsten: composer
- Filip Mitrovic: composer
- Clarice Assad: composer, pianist
- Tony Alcantar: actor
- Merle Dandridge: actress
  - Television: Greenleaf, Sons of Anarchy, The Night Shift
  - Broadway: Once on This Island (2017 Revival), Tarzan, Spamalot, Jesus Christ Superstar, Aida, Rent
- James Romney: musical theatre performer
  - Broadway: Harry Potter and the Cursed Child
- Courtney Reed: musical theatre performer
  - Broadway: ALADDIN
- Damon Gillespie: musical theatre performer
  - Television: Rise, Inside Amy Schumer
  - Broadway: ALADDIN, NEWSIES
- Major Attaway: musical theatre performer
  - Broadway: ALADDIN
- J. Michael Finley: musical theatre performer
  - Film: I Can Only Imagine
  - Broadway: Les Miserables, The Book of Mormon
  - West End (London, UK): The Book of Mormon
- Angela Grovey: musical theatre performer
  - National Tour: Newsies
- Parvesh Cheena: actor
- Barbara Zahora: actress
