= Gilli Moon =

American singer-songwriter

- Also known as: Fleur Flem
- Born: Milan, Italy
- Origin: Sydney, New South Wales, Australia
- Genres: Musical theatre
- Occupations: Musician; Songwriter; Artist Entrepreneur; Author; producer
- Labels: Warrior Girl Music

Gilli Moon, is an Italian-born, Australian-raised, Los Angeles-based singer-songwriter, record producer. She is the co-founder and president of Songsalive!, a song writing organisation, and one of the co-producers of the Los Angeles Women's Music Festival.

== Biography ==
Moon has released seven studio albums, Girl in the Moon (1998), temperamental angel (2001), which includes bass player Christopher Maloney, Woman (2003), which includes a slow arrangement of INXS' Need You Tonight, extraOrdinary life (2005), the Stillness (2010) Skillz (2009), with artist and poet Jeff Walker. Moon had married Walker in August 2007. She has released a remix album, angel remixes (2002) and a compilation album, Refresh (2018). She was as a featured guest performer on guitarist, Jeff Young's debut solo album, Equilibrium.

In 2003 Moon toured as stage manager and performer with Eric Idle, and is mentioned in his book, The Greedy Bastard Tour, based on his blog of that tour. In 2006 she was interviewed by Newsweek Magazine (International Edition) as a pioneer in using the Internet to help her artistic success.

In 2007 Moon's company, Warrior Girl Music, along with Gayle Day and Miria, co-produced Females on Fire or the Los Angeles Women's Music Festival, the first of its kind in that area. Moon also released a various artists album, Females on Fire featuring 100 Female Artists. In 2011 her advice on music business was included in the Music Connection magazine article, 70 Monster Tips! Best Expert Advice.

In 2015 Moon paired up with Paulina Logan to write the song, "For the Moon," which was used in an episode of Girl Makes Indie Movie.

== Discography ==
=== Songs in film ===
- "Obsession" Film (2012) Seventh Dream Ventures (prod co) – song: For The Moon by Paulina Logan and gilli moon
- "Surviving in L.A" Film Trailer (2012) Abbie O'Neill (writer/director) – Song: Be by gilli moon
- "When Love Comes Home" – Feature Film (2010)/ Erica Lynne Owens director – song Sorry co-written with Paulina Logan
- "You Belong to Me" – Feature Film, Pig In The Python Productions (2010) – song "I Think Of Him"
- "Leading Ladies" – Feature Film, Leo Rising Productions (2010) – song "Home" by gilli moon and Jeff Dean
- "Dear Me – A Blogger’s Tale – Feature Film, written and directed by Steve Weiss Smith (2009) – songs "Be","Evolution" and "Naked"
- "Love is Love" Short Film – Evolution/gillimoon from "extraOrdinary life" (US release 2008/9)
- "End of Blue" – various songs from "Woman album" (U.S Release 2002)
- "Bloodshot" – song: Why Do You Love Me Still/gilli moon (U.S Theatrical Release. In Production)
- "The Healer's Son" – songs: Naked Remix/gilli moon; All Because of Love/gilli moon, Franck Bensoussan, Jeffrey Bethuy Dean; The Edge/gilli moon, Franck Bensoussan; Touch Me/gilli moon (U.S Theatrical Release July 2002)
- "I Just Draw" short film, by Paul Power (2000), a Sundance Film Festival contender – - song: A Little Bit Better/gilli moon, Tom Deluca
- "Whisky, Riddles and dandelion Wine" – produced and directed by David Straus (2000). Broadcast in Latin/Pan America – - song: Too Much/gilli moon
- "Asphalt Junkie" (U.S Release – Film 1998) – - song: So Nice/gilli moon, James Marcey

=== Songs in television ===
- MTV's "True Life" – Hollywood
- Invasion Iowa – Spike TV
- Dr. 90210 – E! Network – various instrumental cues
- Famous, with Keanu Reeves – various instrumental cues
- Lassie's Pet Vet – various instrumental cues
- "South of Nowhere" TV show – Nickelodeon 2006 – "Secret of My Heart" and "Bliss", written by gilli moon and Tom Deluca.
- "That's Life" – song: A Little Bit Better/gilli moon, Tom Deluca (U.S Network Television – CBS January 2001)
- "Rip Girls" (U.S – Disney Channel 22 April 2000) Produced by Martha Coolidge – song: A Little Bit Better/gilli moon, Tom Deluca
- "The Cut" (U.S – MTV 1999)
- "Cupid" – "You Belong To Me"/vocals (U.S – ABC TV 1999)

=== Songs in other media ===
- Telecom Italia – Bye Is Such a Lonely Word

=== Recordings ===
- "Refresh" CD – gilli moon (Warrior Girl Music 2018)
- "the stillness" CD – gilli moon (Warrior Girl Music 2010)
- "Skillz" CD – J.Walker & gilli moon (Divine Nine Productions 2009)
- "extraordinary life" enhanced CD – gilli moon (Warrior Girl Music 2005)
- "Females on Fire" CD compilation 1, 2 and 3 (Warrior Girl Music 2005-8)
- "The Unmaking of Me" EP – Jeff Young. gilli moon, guest vocals (2004)
- "Woman" CD – gilli moon (Warrior Girl Music 2002)
- "Spirits of Love" CD – Nocy. gilli moon co-wrote and performed 2 songs (2001)
- "The Angel Remixes" EP – "Temperamental Angel" and "Naked" Dance remixes – gilli moon (Warrior Girl Music 2001)
- "temperamental angel" CD – gilli moon (Warrior Girl Music 2000)
- "Perfect Wordz" CD – Jessica Christ (tribe Records 2000)
- "Lust" CD – feature track "You Belong to Me"/vocals (CD – Drama! Music 1998)
- "Girl in the Moon" CD – gilli moon (CD Indigo Moon Records 1998)
- "All for Sale" – featuring gilli moon on "Surrender"/Greg Robinson (GR Productions 1996)
- Songsalive! CDs 1, 2, 3, 4, 5 & 6- gilli moon produced Cds and has one song featured on each (CDs Indigo Moon Records/Warrior Girl Music 1998 – 2002)
- "Shamballa" – Shamballa. gilli moon lead vocals and co-wrote 1 song (E.P – Class Entertainment 1995)

=== Recordings with other artists ===
- Kevin Hovey band – song "Bye Is Such a Lonely Word"
- Paulina Logan "Wallflower" – songs "Sorry" and "For the Moon"
- Holly Light "Forgiveness Road" – songs "Hurricane", Sentimental I Presume", "Love Ya"
- Nocy "Spirits of Love" – songs "Sweet Holy Man," No Bossa Nova" (Independent, USA 2001)
- Jessica Christ – songs "Feel" and "Questions" (Tribe Records, 2000)
- Erikah Karst – song "Bliss" (Mercury/Universal), Holland / David Kershenbaum, producer 1999)
- Rhonda Stisi – songs "Beside Me", "This Life We Live" (Indigo Moon Records 1998)
- Shamballa – song "Reach Out" (E.P – Class Entertainment 1995)

=== Production credits ===
- gilli moon – "the stillness" (Warrior Girl Music 2010) Producer
- Mark Stortvedt – "The Kingdom of God" 2010 / Producer
- David Babich – yet untitled 2011 / Producer
- Jeff Walker & gilli moon – "Skillz" (2009) / Producer
- Paulina Logan – "Wallflower" (2007) / Producer
- Holly Light – "Forgiveness Road" (2007) / Producer
- gilli moon – "extraOrdinary life" (Warrior Girl Music 2005) Producer
- Dina Gathe – "Bother Me" (Soundstruck 2005) Producer
- "Females on Fire" Cd Compilation 1, 2, 3 and Art Of Men Cd Compilation (Warrior Girl Music 2005–09) Executive Producer
- gilli moon – "Woman" (Warrior Girl Music 2002) Producer
- Ari Inkilainen "Women in Blue Elements" (Warrior Girl Music 2002) Executive Producer
- gilli moon – "temperamental angel" (Warrior Girl Music 2000) Producer
- Rhonda Stisi – "Under The Covers" (Kiley Records 1999) Co-Producer
- gilli moon – "Girl in the Moon" (CD Indigo Moon Records 1998) Producer
- Songsalive! CD Samplers 1, 2, 3, 4, 5, 6, 7 (Warrior Girl Music 1998–2002) Executive Producer
- Rhonda Stisi – "Rhonda Stisi" (Indigo Moon Records 1998) Producer
- Shamballa – "Shamballa" co-producer (E.P – Class Entertainment 1995) Associate Producer

=== Songs in video ===
- "Days in November" – Music video – gilli moon 2010
- "The Stillness" – Music video – gilli moon 2010
- "I'm Alive" – Music video – gilli moon 2010
- "Undone" – Music video – gilli moon 2005
- "Shine" – Music video – Laguna Public School, Australia 2004
- "Woman" Music video – gilli moon 2003
- "temperamental angel" Music video – gilli moon 2001
- "Feel For You" Music video – gilli moon 1998
- "The Great North Road" (Australia Release – Film 1997)

=== Songs in theatre ===
- "Matreya" – Hollywood – National Heritage Project 2009
- "Commedia Dell' Arte" – Wollombi Valley Artists 2002
- "Lips" – written and directed by Chris Kerby (National Tour, Australia and Great Britain 1997)
- "Alliance Concert" – Class Entertainment (Sydney 1995)
- "Success" the musical – Warrior Girl Music – in development
