= Filip Mitrovic =

- Born: 1 April 1979 (age 47)
- Genres: Film score; contemporary classical music; pop
- Occupation: Music Composer
- Label: EMI Music

Filip Mitrovic is a Serbian-American composer and producer from Los Angeles, California. In 2012, he was nominated for Daytime Emmy Award in the category Outstanding Achievement in Music Direction and Composition for a Drama Series, and in 2015, Mitrovic was nominated for Latin Grammy Award for Album of the Year. Mitrovic's music was premiered at Carnegie Hall in 2010. In 2025, Mitrovic gave a TEDx Talk in his hometown of Belgrade, Serbia, where he outlined his approach to the creative process.

== Early life ==
Mitrovic was born in Belgrade, Serbia. Since his father was a musician and producer as well, Mitrovic grew up surrounded by music. He began playing guitar at age 8 and was soon immersed in the musical world. In 2000, Mitrovic took advantage of a full scholarship at Chicago College of Performing Arts in Chicago, Illinois, to study Music Composition & Orchestration. After graduating, Mitrovic moved to New York City to work for the film music collective tomandandy, where he contributed his original music to many Hollywood blockbusters and TV commercials. He apprenticed under Angelo Badalamenti.

== Film & TV Scoring career ==
After venturing out on his own, Mitrovic collaborated with Jon Batiste and The Blue Man Group to create the opening credits theme music for George Lopez's blockbuster Spare Parts (Lionsgate), starring Marisa Tomei and Jamie Lee Curtis. He then created the main titles theme music for Netflix original series Four Seasons in Havana. These two engagements led Mitrovic to scoring numerous films and TV shows, including the Hollywood feature Manhattan Undying (Paramount Pictures), Donald Glover's Guava Island documentary series about Cuban prodigy musicians, and Marija Stojnic's Speak So I Can See You (Doc Fortnight, Museum of Modern Art, NYC).

== Tuney ==
In 2019, Mitrovic co-founded Tuney, a platform that patented sonic branding at scale. In 2020, the company joined MuckerLab, a startup accelerator in Santa Monica.

== Ear Candy Shop ==
In 2015, Filip Mitrovic and Antony Demekhin founded Ear Candy Shop, a boutique music production house for advertising, providing music for TV campaigns. Clients include Coca-Cola, Maker's Mark, Facebook, Hennessy, American Eagle and others. He collaborated with Teddy Swims on an ad campaign for Piedmont Healthcare and with Michael Kiwanuka on Coca-Cola's spot for the 2024 Summer Olympics.

== Dark Bardo ==
In 2021, Mitrovic partnered up with producer Andy Baldwin to create Dark Bardo, a music production duo inspired by a mysterious package from an anonymous sender that contained a plastic sheriff's badge, a Cuban cigar, and a copy of Illusions: The Adventures of a Reluctant Messiah, a novel by Richard Bach. The debut came out in 2023, featuring the artists Shungudzo and Nini Fabi (Haerts) and it was featured on Apple Music's homepage as "Best New Release".

== Films ==
Year	Title	Role	Notes
2025	Meduza	Music Composer	
2025	Wanderlust / Izlet	Music Composer	
2023	Sweet Sorrow / Zal	Music Composer	
2022	An Intense Flare Of Light	Music Composer	Rhode Island International Film Festival
2022	Trail of the Beast / Trag Divljaci	Music Composer	
2022	De viaje con los Derbez (Amazon Prime)	Main Titles Theme Music Producer	
2020	Nun of Your Business	Music Composer	ZagrebDox Audience Award Winner
2019	Speak So I Can See You	Original Music "Arhiva" Composer	Museum of Modern Art, IDFA
2019	Guava Island (Amazon Prime)	Music Composer, Kids Segment	
2019	Love Cuts / Rezi	Music Composer	Evolution Mallorca International Film Festival Best Feature Film Winner
2017	Four Seasons in Havana (NETFLIX)	Main Titles Theme Music Composer, Producer	Platino Awards Best TV Miniseries Winner
2017	Emerald City (NBC)	Trailer Music Composer	
2016	Manhattan Undying (Paramount Pictures)	Music Composer	
2016	Wonderwell	Assistant to Angelo Badalamenti	
2015	Spare Parts (Lionsgate)	Main Titles Theme Music Composer, Producer	
2014	Moonshiners (National Geographic)	Music Composer	
2013	America's Book of Secrets (History Channel)	Music Composer	
2012	Moonshiners (Discovery Channel)	Music Composer	
2011	Ancient Aliens (History Channel)	Music Composer	
2011	One Life To Live (ABC USA)	Music Composer	Daytime Emmy Award Nominee, Outstanding Achievement in Music Direction and Composition for a Drama Series
2008	The Echo (Image Entertainment)	Additional Music Composer	
2008	Sleep Dealer	Additional Music Composer	
