= Badi Assad =

Brazilian jazz/worldbeat musician

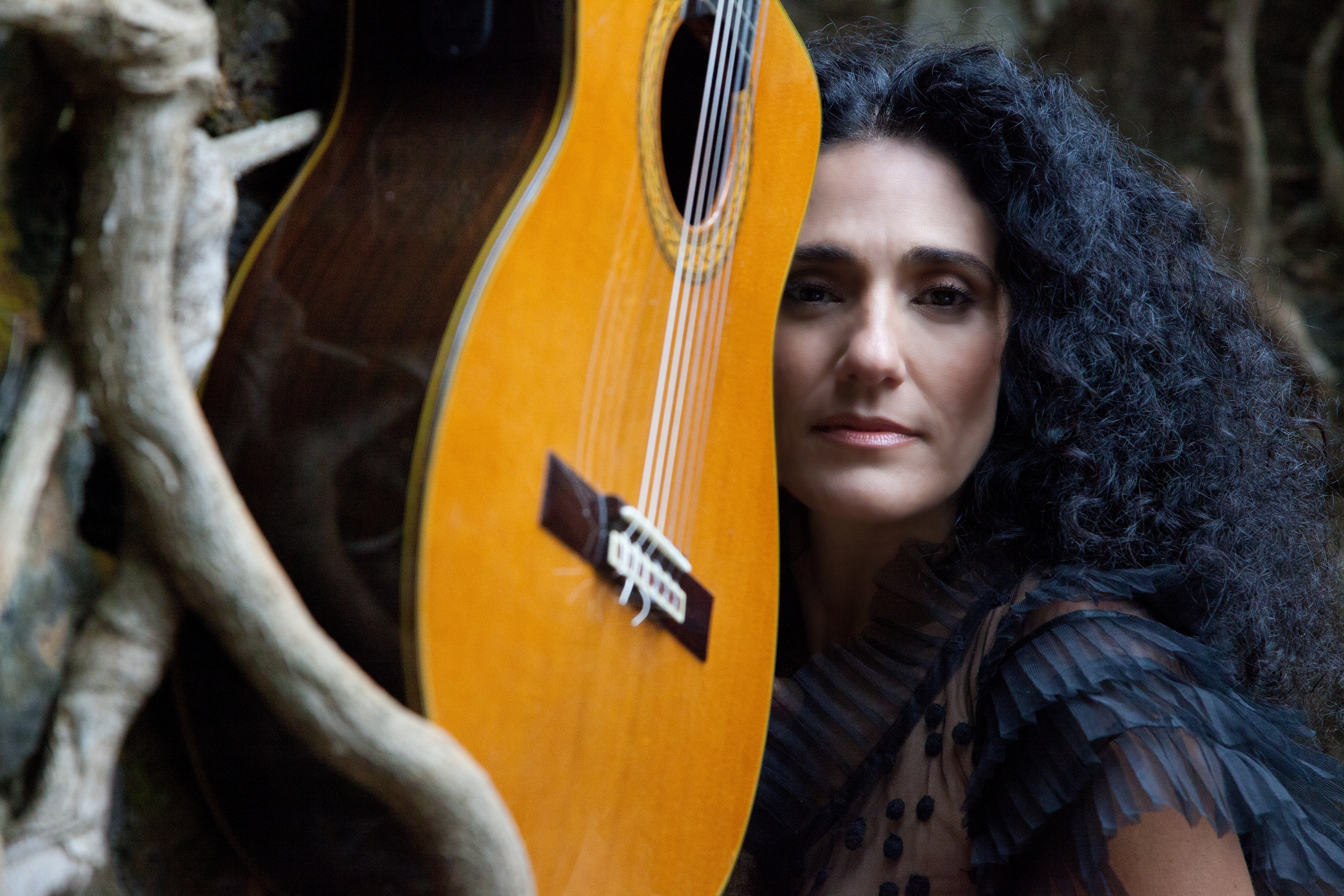

Background information
- Born: 23 December 1966 (age 59); São João da Boa Vista, São Paulo, Brazil
- Genres: Jazz, world
- Occupations: Singer, musician, composer
- Instruments: Guitar, vocals
- Years active: 1980s–present
- Labels: Chesky, Quatro Ventos
- Website: badiassad.com/en

Badi Assad (born 23 December 1966) is a Brazilian singer, composer and guitarist in the jazz and worldbeat genres.

== Early life and education ==
Assad was born in São João da Boa Vista in the state of São Paulo, but lived in Rio de Janeiro until she was twelve. Her father, Jorge Assad, of Lebanese descent, plays bandolim (mandolin), and her two older brothers are the classical guitarists Sérgio Assad and Odair Assad of Duo Assad.

== Career ==
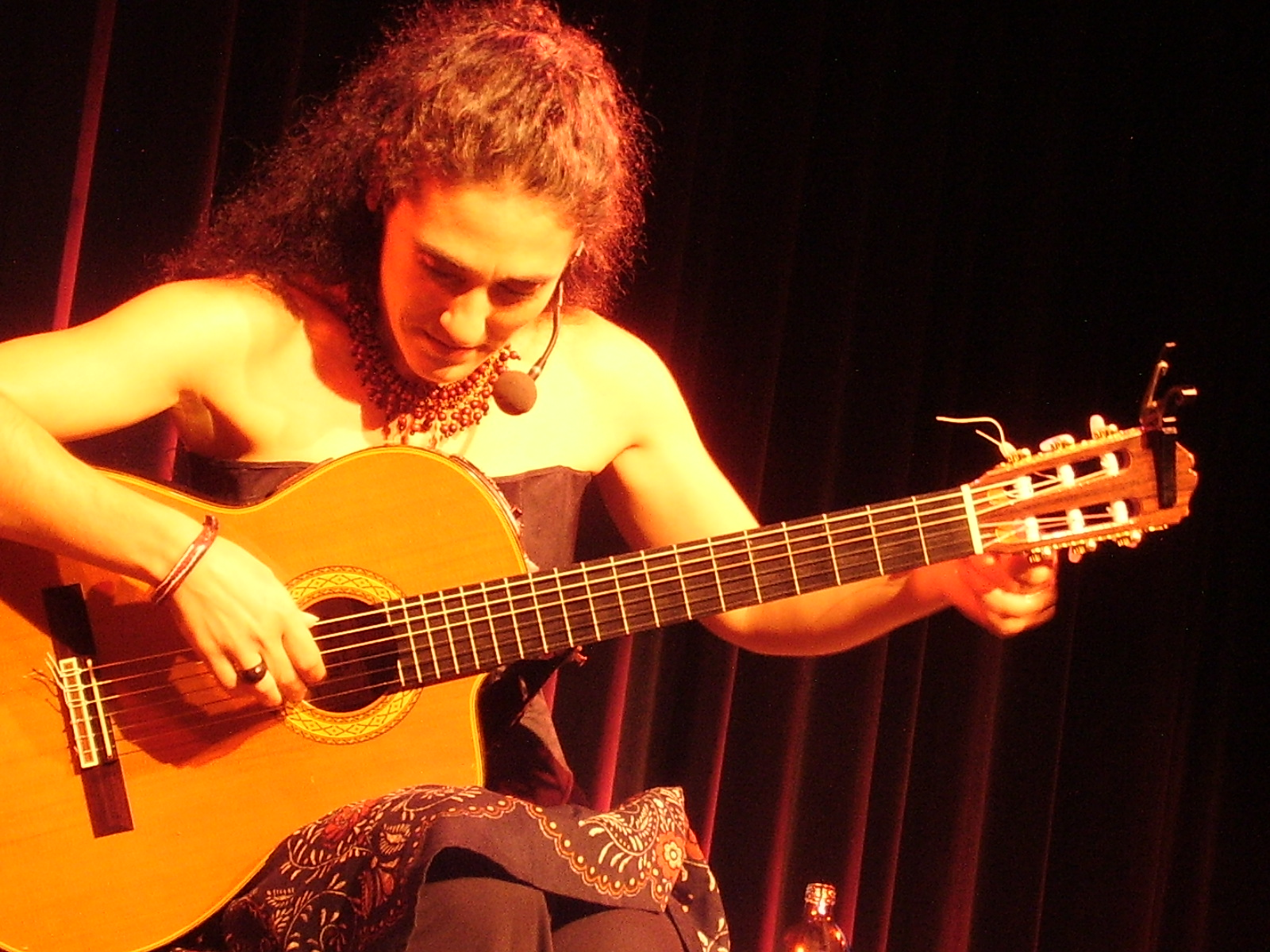
Assad in 2006

Assad studied classical guitar at the University of Rio de Janeiro and won the Young Instrumentalists Contest ("Concurso Jovens Instrumentistas for Young Musicians") in Rio de Janeiro in 1984. In 1986, she joined the Guitar Orchestra of Rio de Janeiro, headed by guitarist Turíbio Santos as conductor. In 1987, she was named "Best Brazilian Guitarist" of the International Heitor Villa-Lobos Festival. By 1987 she had played in Europe, Israel and Brazil with guitarist Françoise-Emmanuelle Denis under the name Duo Romantique. In 1988 she wrote Antagonismus, a solo performance in which she worked as guitarist, singer, actress and dancer.

She released her first solo album, Dança dos Tons, in 1988. In 1989 she was selected out of two hundred women to perform as one of two vocalists in the play Mulheres de Hollanda, a musical written by Tatiana Cobbett, based on the works of Chico Buarque de Holanda. Assad has also been featured in the Heineken Concerts in 1992 with Raul de Souza and Heraldo do Monte, and in 1993 with Rafael Rabello, Dori Caymmi and Marisa Monte.

In 1994, she became associated with Chesky Records and recorded the album Solo, followed in 1995 with Rhythms, which won Guitar Player magazine's readers' poll for Best Classical Album of the Year. Assad, who sings in English and Portuguese, was voted Best Acoustic Fingerstyle Guitarist by the editors of Guitar Player in 1995. In 1998 she released Chameleon. Her appearance on the French night-time talk show Canal+ was seen by over two million viewers. In July 1998, she played Europe's most renowned summer festivals sharing the stage with such artists as Cassandra Wilson, Joe Cocker, Maria Joao and fellow Brazilians Chico Cesar, Marisa Monte, and Gilberto Gil. The single, "Waves", landed in Spain's Top 10 for many weeks and was included in the soundtrack of the 2003 film It Runs in the Family.

Owing to a motor disability called Focal dystonia, she was unable to play between 1998 and 2001, but she made a complete recovery and released a collaborative album with her former husband Jeff Young in 2002 called Nowhere, and 3 Guitars the following year for the Chesky label with jazz guitarists Larry Coryell and John Abercrombie.

In 2004 she signed with the acclaimed German label Deutsche Grammophon, releasing two albums: Verde (2004) and Wonderland (2006). Assad loves to re-create songs. In Verde, she brought a bossa-nova style to "One" by U2 and a tango "Bachelorette" by Björk. For Wonderland, she brought songs by Eurythmics, Vangelis, and Tori Amos into her world music style. Wonderland was selected among Britain's BBC 100 best CDs.

In 2005 she released an album and DVD with her family: Sergio e Odair Assad and Their Family – Um Momento De Puro Amor. In 2010 Badi released her first DVD, Badi Assad, which she and her husband Dimitri Vakros co-produced. It was directed by Assad's nephew Rodrigo Assad (son of Sérgio Assad). This DVD displays her live performance experimentation. In the same year she was featured performer (actress/singer) in the opera-musical Opera das Pedras, in São Paulo, Brasil, directed by Denise Milan and Lee Breuer. In 2011 she started a new project with her brothers Sérgio and Odair and their daughters Clarice and Carolina, as a quintet. They have been touring the world.

Assad was voted one of the best guitarists in the world by Guitar Player magazine. She has worked with Bobby McFerrin, Yo-Yo Ma, Sarah McLachlan, Seu Jorge, and Naná Vasconcelos. She has performed in some of the most prestigious international festivals such as Montreal Jazz Festival, North Sea Jazz Festival in the Netherlands as well as in such theater venues as L'Opera de Paris, Metropolitan Museum of Art in New York, Palais de Beaux-Arts de Bruxelles, and the Greek Theatre in Los Angeles. She has also appeared in Farm Aid and Lilith Fair.

In 2012 Assad made her first trip to India at the invitation of the Brazilian Embassy; it was a side event of the visit of the Brazilian President Dilma Rousseff to represent Brazil at the IV BRICS Summit, an event that brings together the major emerging economies of the world. She also performed with the Ballet Teatro Castro Alves at the Venice Biennale. In November she released her first independent and authorial album Amor e Outras Manias Crônicas through her own label Quatro Ventos. APCA (São Paulo Association of Art Clinics) – one of the most important awards in Brazil since 1972 – recently awarded her for her work in songwriting and composition. The same evening the Brazilian Marisa Monte also graced the same stage.

In 2013 Assad released Between Love and Luck in U.S. and her song "Pega no Coco" won the first prize as the Best World Music in the U.S. Songwriting Competition. In 2014, she was invited to be the co-curator of the New York Guitar Festival and committed to compose the soundtrack for the Chinese silent film The Goddess, playing it live at Merkin Hall in New York. Jon Pareles of The New York Times said Assad "arrived with a headset microphone and an electric guitar (which could simulate acoustic-guitar tones) that had a drumstick under the strings, lifting them away from the frets. The first sounds she played...were sliding pitches suggesting a koto; soon she was plucking and tapping ethereal chords on both sides of the drumstick and then cooing, in a voice like affectionate baby talk, about innocence and mysticism...She continued with Brazilian pop songs transformed by her imaginative virtuosity, moving from gauzy delicacy to vigorous propulsion, from dreaming to dancing and back."

== Discography ==
- Danca do Tons (Crescente Produções, 1989)
- Solo (Chesky, 1994)
- Rhythms (Chesky, 1995)
- Echoes of Brazil (Chesky, 1997)
- Chameleon (PolyGram, 1998)
- Nowhere with Jeff Young (Watersounds, 2002)
- Danca das Ondas (Gha, 2003)
- Three Guitars with John Abercrombie and Larry Coryell (Chesky, 2003)
- Verde (Edge, 2004)
- Wonderland (Edge, 2006)
- Between Love and Luck (Quatro Ventos, 2013)
- Love and Other Manias (O-tone, 2014)
- Hatched (Quatro Ventos, 2015)
- Around the World (Ropeadope, 2020)

== Concerts on video ==
- Three Guitars – The Paris Concert 2004 with Larry Coryell and John Abercrombie (Inakustik, 2005)
- Badi Assad (Flowfish, 2012)

== Film scores ==
- Children of the Amazon by Denise Zmekhol (2008) with Naná Vasconcelos
