= Viviana Guzmán =

Chilean flutist (born 1964)

Vivana Guzman
- Born: August 20, 1964 (age 62); Concepcion, Chile
- Occupations: flutist, composer
- Years active: 1990–present

Viviana Guzmán (born August 20, 1964) is a Chilean professional flutist, composer, dancer and poet, who performs over 80 concerts a year, and has played in 122 countries. She has been described by The New York Times as "an imaginative artist". It has also been said of her that "Guzmán may be the first flutist since her teacher Jean-Pierre Rampal, to be able to establish a sustaining solo career." She coaches for the Peninsula Youth Orchestra and teaches at the University of California, Santa Cruz.

== Early life and education ==
Born in Concepcion, Chile, Guzmán came to the United States as a child in order to get medical treatment for displaced hips, and now lives near San Francisco, California. By the age of 15, she played as a soloist with orchestra, studied with Jean-Pierre Rampal and was featured on NBC's nationally televised John Denver music special. Guzmán has also studied with Albert Tipton, James Galway, and Julius Baker.

Guzmán attended Rice University on fellowship, first with an emphasis on medicine; subsequently, she chose music as her career path and attended the Juilliard School on scholarship. Guzmán gave her New York recital debut at the Carnegie Hall Recital Hall.

A winner of the 1991 Young Artists Auditions of Artists International, she won numerous other First Prizes in competitions including the New York Flute Club Competition; Five Towns Music and Arts Foundation and the Performers of Connecticut Young Artists Competition. She was also a recipient of the Lincoln Center Scholarship; Institute of Hispanic culture Award; Shepherd Award; Immanuel Olshan Award; Hirsch Award; Phillips Foundation Award; and the Ruth Burr Award.

== Career ==
She has appeared as a soloist with orchestras in Wisconsin, Vermont, and Houston; the Khabarovsk Chamber Orchestra (Khabarovsk, Russia), Filarmonica de Santiago (Santiago, Chile), Great Falls Symphony (Great Falls, Montana, U.S.), Diablo Symphony (Walnut Creek, California, U.S.), Irving Symphony (Irving, Texas, U.S.), Palo Alto Chamber Orchestra, San Jose Chamber Orchestra, and in New York City's Alice Tully Hall, Carnegie Hall and Avery Fisher Hall. As an orchestral musician, she has played with the Texas Opera Theatre Orchestra, Mikhail Baryshnikov's White Oak Dance Project, and in the Broadway musical, "Sunset Boulevard" with Glenn Close. As a member of the Houston Grand Opera, she accompanied Plácido Domingo, and with the New World Symphony in Miami she played under Michael Tilson Thomas.

Guzmán has been heard on NPR's Morning Edition and Great Performances, West Coast Live, PBS, as well as on WNYC New York, KUSC in Los Angeles, KPFA, and KDFC in San Francisco, among others. On television, she has appeared in the United States and Latin America including Good Day New York, Good Morning Arizona, Good Morning Houston, Sabado Gigante, Datebook San Jose, and BayTV in San Francisco. The premiere of her music video was aired on television internationally in 31 countries on Univision and Arts Showcase Network. She has been featured on the cover of Latina Style (2003) and profiled in Cosmopolitan (Español) magazine (July 2003). Her many recording credits include the album Afterplay by Brian Kelly (2008).

Currently, Guzmán performs as a soloist with orchestra, as a solo artist, and with the quartets, "Viviana & DIVAS LATINAS" and "Festival of Four". She combines dance, including bellydancing, into some of her performances.

== Discography ==
- Telemann Flute Fantasies 1996
- Planet Flute 1997
- Danza de Amor (with Festival of Four) in 2000
- Serenity 2001 National Geographic Compilation Album
- Mostly Tango 2002
- Argentine Music 2006
- Meditations For Flute 2007
- Traveling Sonata 2013

== Publications ==
- Contributing author, entry in Greatest Inventions of the Last 2,000 Years, by John Brockman (Simon & Schuster, 2000).
- Love Soliloquies, Viviana Guzmán (Syren Press, 2002).
