= Screen Souvenirs =

1932 film

- Film poster
- Distributed by: Paramount Pictures
- Release date: 1932
- Country: United States
- Language: English

Screen Souvenirs is a 1932 American short film. At the 5th Academy Awards, held in 1932, it was nominated for an Academy Award for Best Short Subject (Novelty).
