= C.W. Shumway & Sons =

Foundry in Batavia, Illinois, US

Coordinates: 41°50′52.31″N 88°18′30.74″W

C.W. Shumway & Sons was a foundry operational in Batavia, Illinois, from 1872 to 2002. It produced metal castings for various industrial uses and for awards, including the Emmy Award, Academy Awards, and the Vince Lombardi Trophy. The company was closed in 2002 due to changing market demands. At the time of its closure, it was one of the oldest foundries in the United States.

== History ==
Founded in 1872, the company was founded by Charles W. Shumway in response to a need for castings due to the destruction of the Great Chicago Fire the year before. After taking on A.N. Merrill as a partner, who then soon retired, he soon partnered with Charles Osgood to form the Osgood and Shumway Foundry Co.. Over the years, various partners joined and left the company, and the company took its final name in 1904 after his second son joined the family.

The first products that the company made were exclusively of iron, including iron pillars for buildings. In 1895, it started producing castings for furnaces, water heaters, sewing machines, and other kinds of machines. By 1920, the company diversified into making ventilators, chimney clean-out doors, grates, and other products.

In 2002, the foundry was closed due to changing trends in the market, including the increased use of precision casting. The foundry's buildings were demolished in 2007.

== Major awards produced ==
From 1928 to 1982, the company cast the Oscar statuette for the Academy Awards. In 1983, R.S. Owens & Company took over casting of the award. The trophies each took between three and four weeks to produce, and weighed 8.5 pounds (3.9 kg). Additionally, the company helped to cast the Vince Lombardi Trophy, which was then finished by Tiffany & Co.
