= 1932 Academy Awards =

1932 Academy Awards may refer to:

- 5th Academy Awards, the Academy Awards ceremony that took place November 18, 1932 honoring films released between August 1, 1931, and July 31, 1932
- 6th Academy Awards, the Academy Awards ceremony that took place March 16, 1934 honoring films released between August 1, 1932, and December 31, 1933
