= Legacy Oscar =

Legacy Oscar is a term referring to an Academy Award perceived to have been given in recognition of the recipient's performances in prior films, rather than for the performance specifically nominated. The implication is that the winning performance was inferior to the recipient's prior performances and would not have won in its own right.

== Examples ==
- Best Picture for Cecil B. DeMille for The Greatest Show on Earth (1952).
- Best Actor for Jack Lemmon in Save the Tiger (1973); he defeated Al Pacino (Serpico), Marlon Brando (Last Tango in Paris) and Robert Redford (The Sting), all of which are considered among the greatest Hollywood performances
- Best Actor for Paul Newman in The Color of Money (1987)
- Best Actress for Jessica Tandy in Driving Miss Daisy (1989)
- Best Actor for Al Pacino in Scent of a Woman (1993)
- Best Actress for Kate Winslet in The Reader (2009)
- Best Actor for Gary Oldman in Darkest Hour (2018)
- Best Actress for Jessica Chastain in The Eyes of Tammy Faye (2022)
- Best Supporting Actress for Jamie Lee Curtis in Everything Everywhere All at Once (2023)
