= Waldemar Dalenogare Neto =

Brazilian film critic

- Born: Waldemar Dalenogare Neto; April 3, 1991 (age 35); Porto Alegre, Rio Grande do Sul, Brazil
- Occupations: YouTuber; film critic; university professor

YouTube information
- Channel: Dalenogare Críticas
- Years active: 2019–present
- Genres: Film criticism; Filmmaking
- Subscribers: 321 thousand
- Views: 70.5 million
- Last updated: April 8, 2026
- Website: www.dalenogare.com

Waldemar Dalenogare Neto (Porto Alegre, April 3, 1991) better known as Dalenogare, is a Brazilian film critic, researcher, historian and university professor. He was the first South American to join the Critics Choice Association, which organizes the Critics' Choice Movie Awards. He is also a member of Film Independent (where he votes for the Independent Spirit Awards), Academia Brasileira de Cinema, Online Film Critics Society (OFCS), and director of CINESOV (Center for Soviet Film Studies).

He has a doctorate in history from the Pontifical Catholic University of Rio Grande do Sul (PUCRS) and a postgraduate degree in cinema. He currently resides in the United States, where he works in a research laboratory in Boston. As of 2019, he started talking about cinema on his own YouTube channel, called Dalenogare Críticas. In June 2021 Dalenogare was responsible for discovering the earliest known mention of the term Oscar in the press, which was in journalist Relman Morin's "Cinematters" column in the "Los Angeles Evening Post-Record" on December 5, 1933.

== Award ==
- 2021 Fulbright-Capes Thesis Award, with the research The United States and Operation Condor, carried out under the guidance of Professor Helder Gordim da Silveira.
