= Popularity contest =

Contest based on amount of support

A popularity contest is a real or attributed contest in which the sole criterion for winning is how many votes one gets, such that the winner is the most liked contestant. Although the phrase is often used disparagingly to suggest that some process is improperly based on popular appeal, the term historically referred to real contests sponsored by newspapers in the late 19th century and early 20th century America. In 1914, the legality of these contests was challenged. A Kentucky appeals court ruled that popularity contests did not violate the state's lottery law.

== See also ==
- Audience award
