= R.S. Owens & Company =

American trophy manufacturing company

Coordinates: 41°58′53.49″N 87°45′35.57″W

R.S. Owens is an awards design and manufacturing company based in Chicago, Illinois, and has been in business since 1938. The company describes itself as the "world's largest manufacturer of premier awards".

The company manufactures and designs custom trophies for a worldwide market. R.S. Owens has been the exclusive supplier of the ATAS, Primetime Emmy Awards, since 1983. The company also supplies the NATAS Daytime and Sports Emmy awards. In addition, R.S. Owens supplies Emmy Awards for the International market, IATAS and selected Regional Chapter Emmy awards throughout the US.

R.S. Owens had been the official manufacturer of the Academy Award since 1982 as well as the Academy's Irving Thallberg and Scientific and Engineering awards, but lost the Oscar statuette contract to Polich Tallix in 2016.

In addition to its custom awards manufacturing, the company also offers a stock line of awards and recognition products sold through the United States PPAI and APA distribution market called R.S. Owens Elegance in Awards and Gifts, as well as to Canada through the PPPC network.

== Overview ==
The company was founded in 1938 by Owen Siegel. It currently employs about 100 employees in a 50,000-square-foot facility. Its capabilities include sculpture, custom production of steel molds and dies, custom casting, electroplating, and imprinting. According to the company, it pioneered the use of zinc in metal castings, instead of lead.^{[2]}

In 2012 the company was acquired by St Regis Crystal of Markham, Ontario Canada.

== Current awards manufactured ==
The company has manufactured the molds for the Oscar and Emmy Award trophies since 1982, after taking over from Dodge Trophy & Awards Co, which had been doing the casting since 1930. The awards weigh 8.5 pounds (3.9 kg) each; it takes between three and four weeks to manufacture each statue

In addition to the above awards, the company produces trophies for the Rock & Roll Hall of Fame, American Idol, Russian Golden Gramophone Music Award, London International Advertising Award, GMA Dove Award, Athena Leadership Award, Indy Grand Prix Cup, CMA Lifetime Achievement Award, Cotton Bowl, Sugar Bowl, and the Phil Simms All-Iron Award among others.

== Former awards ==
Before the Poker Hall of Fame was acquired by Harrah's Casino, the company was also commissioned to design an award for Poker Hall of Famers. The award was an 8-inch (200 mm) tall piece of glass with a hand of cards sandblasted at the bottom, the winner's name, and the words "Poker Hall of Fame" in a circle. The circle had a gold emblem bonded to the glass and had the Binion's Horseshoe Casino logo in it. There was a gold plated base with three gold-plated stacks of chips.
