= 5th Academy Awards =

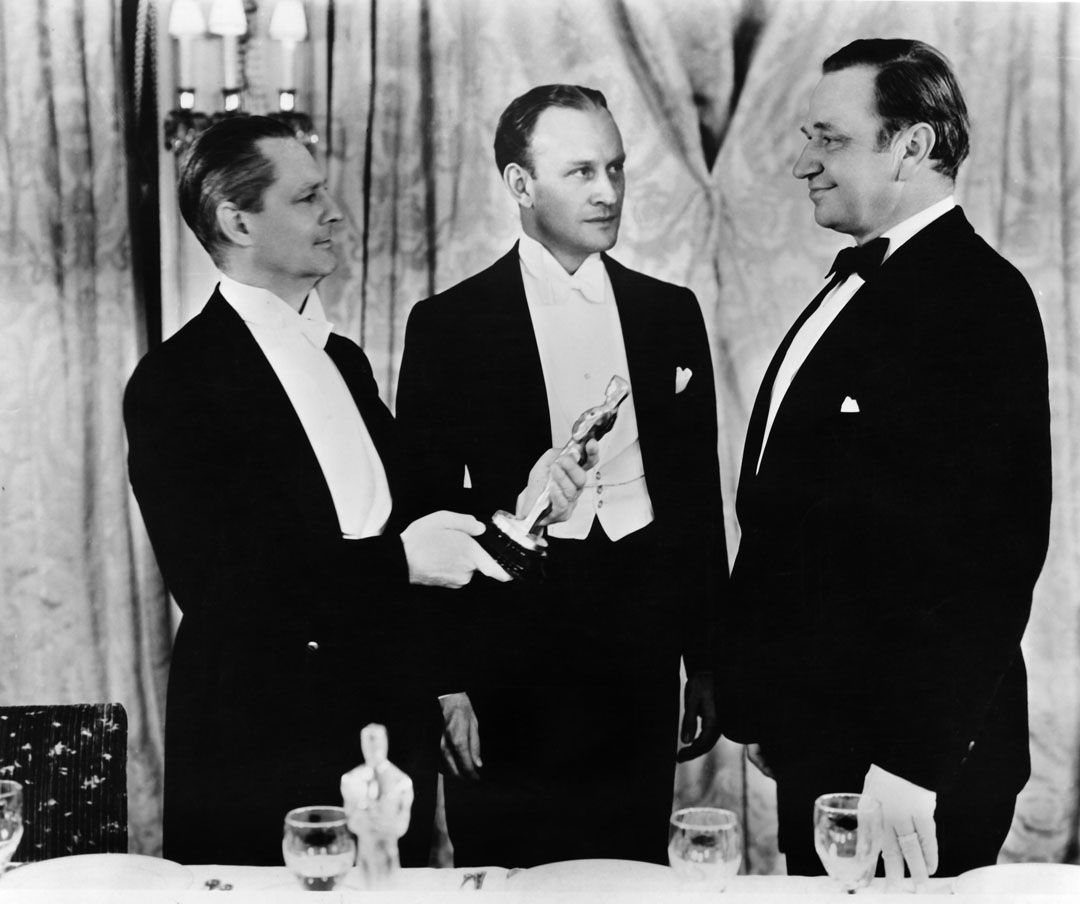
- Wallace Beery, with Lionel Barrymore and Master of Ceremonies Conrad Nagel
- Date: November 18, 1932
- Site: Ambassador Hotel; Los Angeles, California
- Hosted by: Conrad Nagel

Highlights
- Best Picture: Grand Hotel
- Most awards: Bad Girl and The Champ (2)
- Most nominations: Arrowsmith and The Champ (4)

The 5th Academy Awards were held by the Academy of Motion Picture Arts and Sciences on November 18, 1932, at the Ambassador Hotel in Los Angeles, California, hosted by Conrad Nagel. Films screened in Los Angeles between August 1, 1931, and July 31, 1932, were eligible to receive awards. Walt Disney created a short animated film for the banquet, Parade of the Award Nominees.

Grand Hotel became the only Best Picture winner to be nominated for Best Picture without being nominated in any other category. It was the second of six films to date to win Best Picture without a Best Director nomination, preceded by Wings and followed by Driving Miss Daisy, Argo, Green Book, and CODA; and the third of seven to win without a screenwriting nomination.

This was the first of three Oscars in which two films not nominated for Best Picture received more nominations than the winner (Dr. Jekyll and Mr. Hyde and The Guardsman). This happened again at the 25th and 79th Academy Awards.

This year saw the introduction of short film awards, with Best Short Subject, Cartoon winner Flowers and Trees becoming the first color film to win an Oscar.

There was a tie for Best Actor, the first event in Academy history. Fredric March had led Wallace Beery in the balloting by only one vote, and the rules (later changed) said that the leader and runner-up could both be considered winners if they were only 3 votes apart. This left the Academy short one Oscar. By winning Best Actor for The Champ, as well as starring in Grand Hotel, Wallace Beery is one of only two performers to date to appear in a Best Picture-winning film and win an acting Oscar for a different Best Picture nominee in the same year.

This was the last ceremony to date in which no film won more than two Oscars.

== Winners and nominees ==
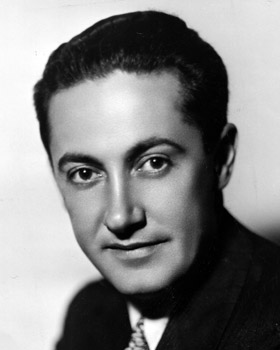
Irving Thalberg; Best Picture winner

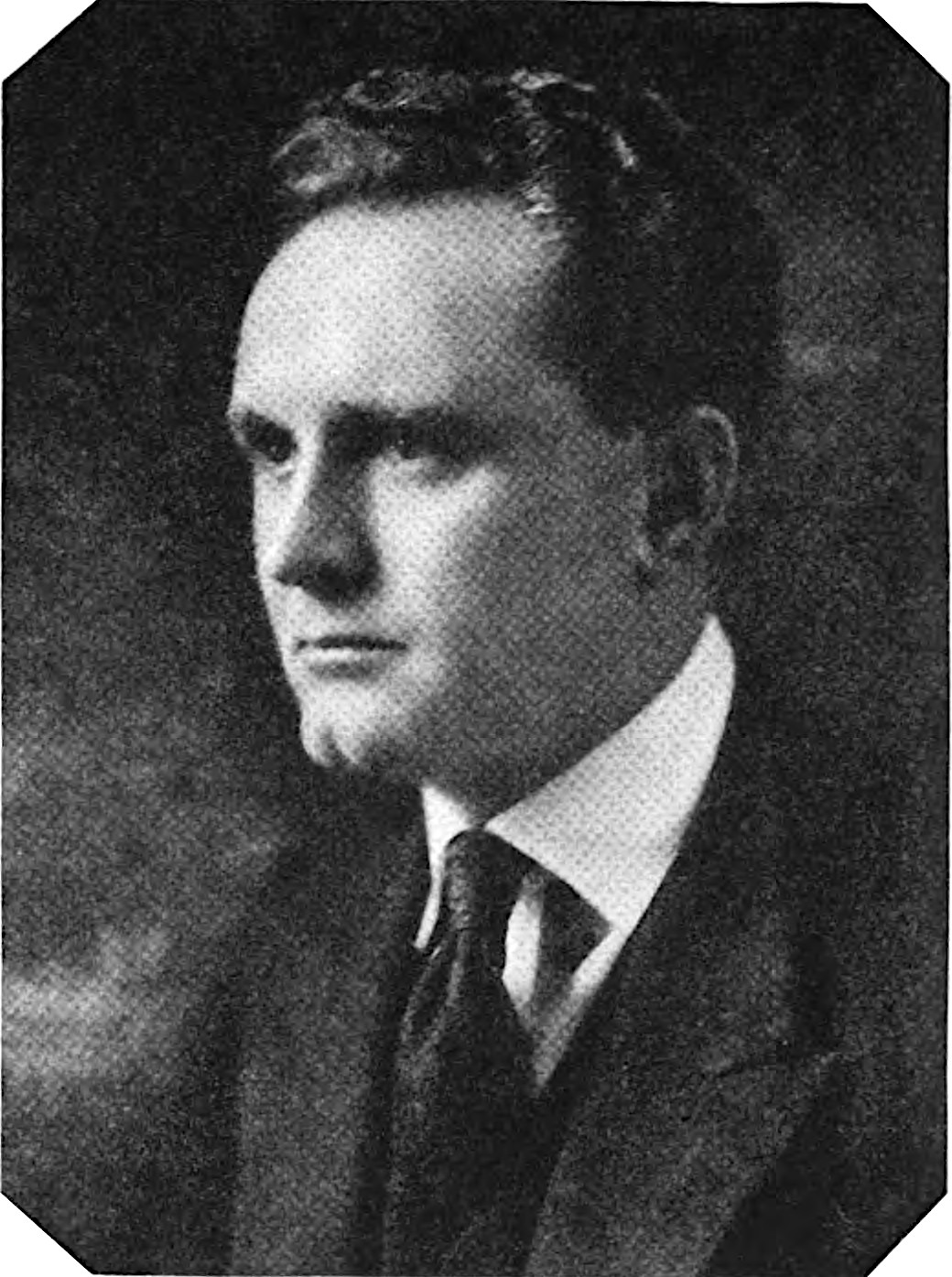
Frank Borzage; Best Director winner

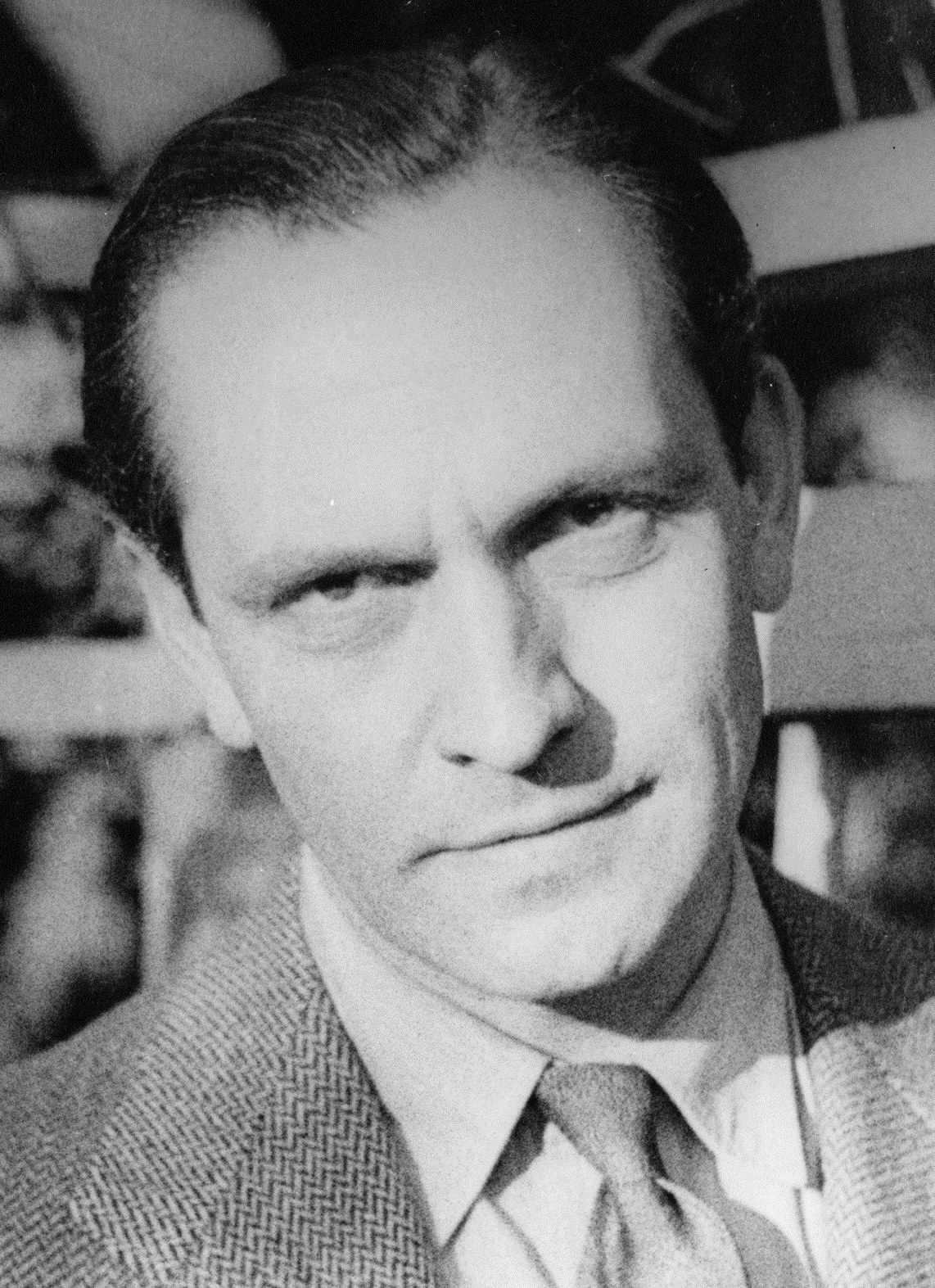
Fredric March; Best Actor co-winner

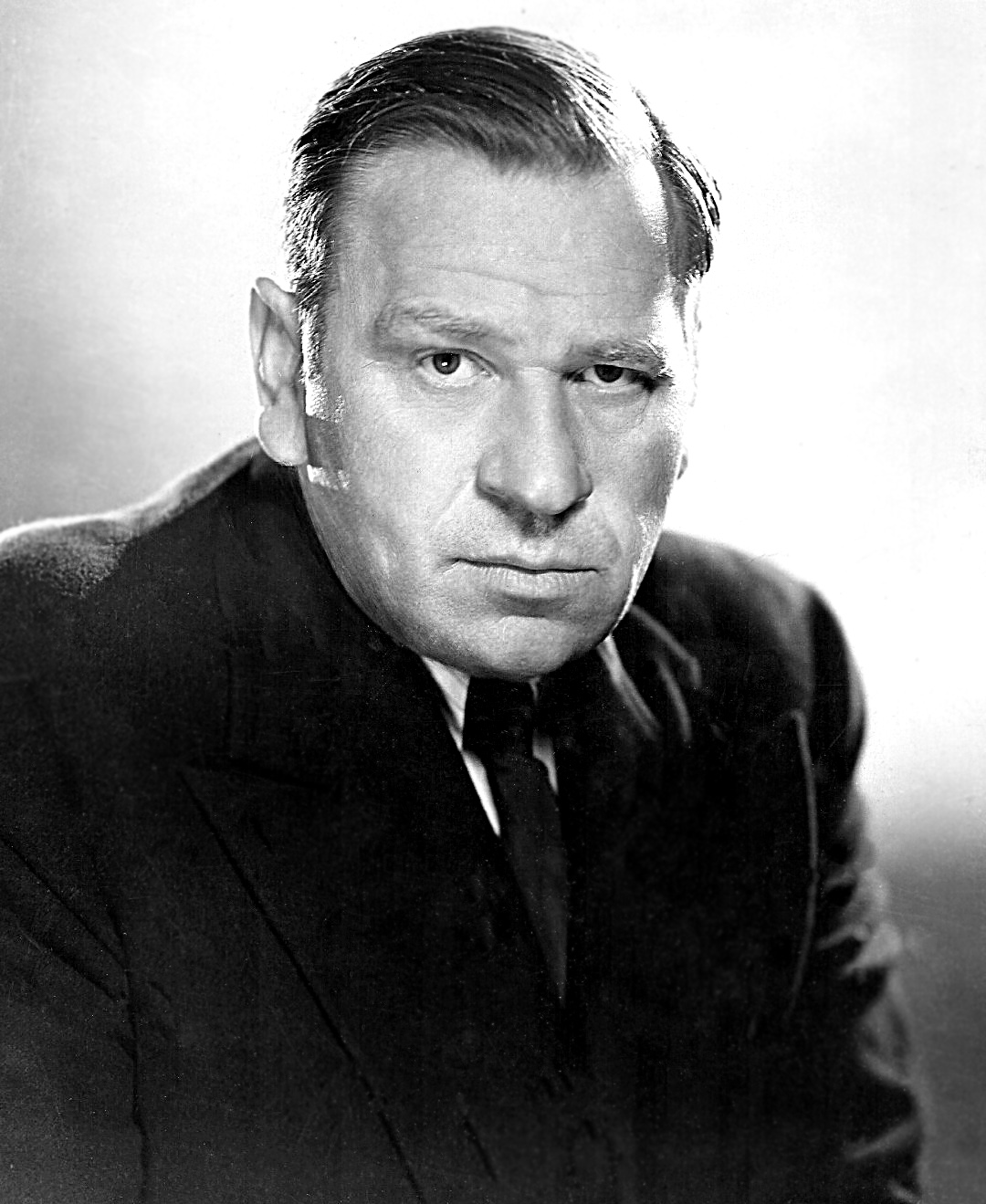
Wallace Beery; Best Actor co-winner

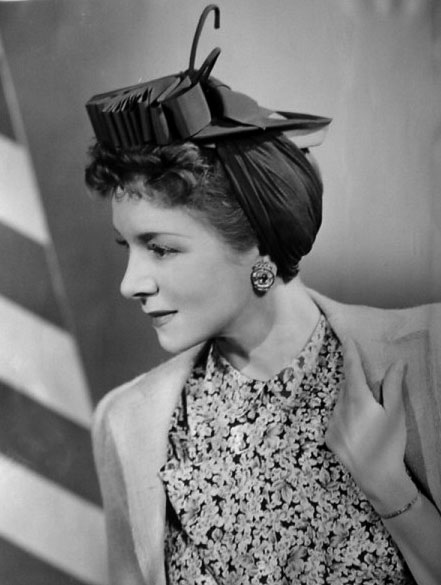
Helen Hayes; Best Actress winner

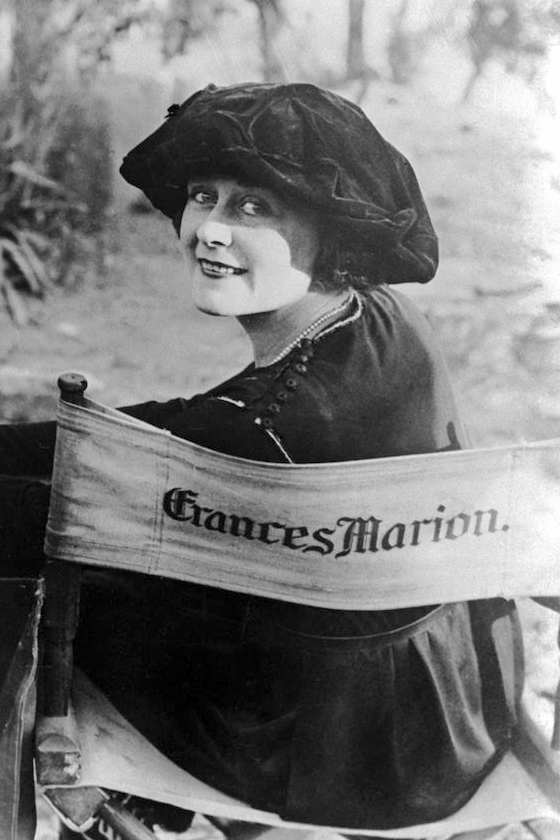
Frances Marion; Best Original Story winner

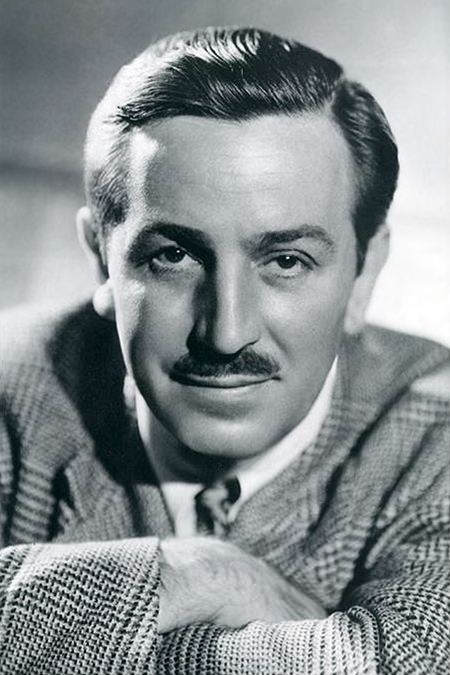
Walt Disney; Best Short Subject, Cartoon co-winner and Honorary Academy Award recipient

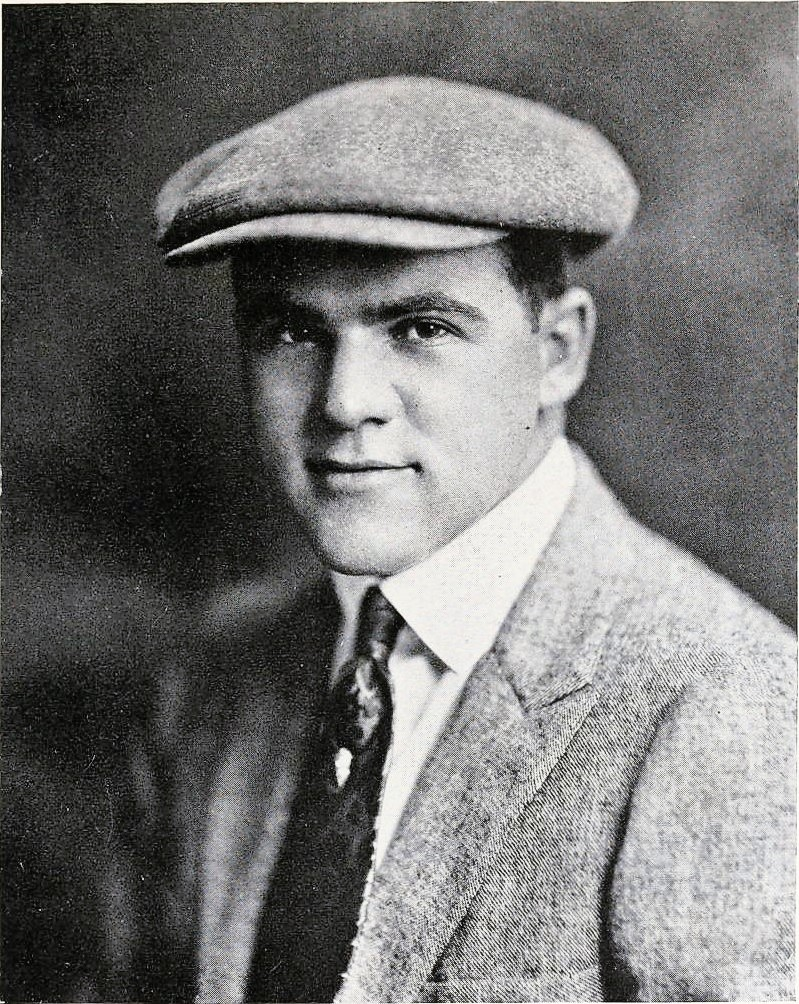
Hal Roach; Best Live Action Short Subject, Comedy winner

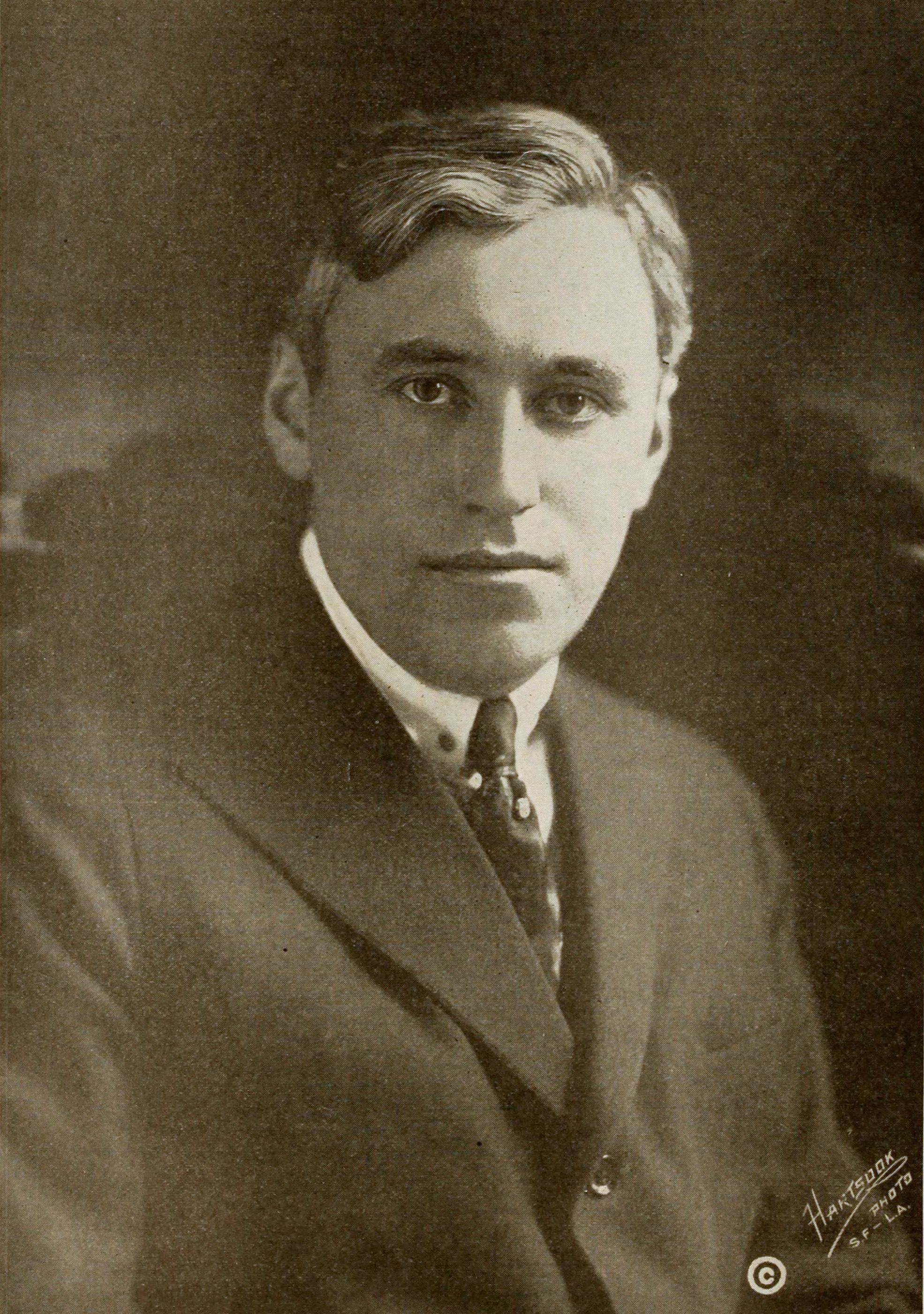
Mack Sennett; Best Live Action Short Subject, Novelty winner

=== Awards ===
Nominees were announced on October 12, 1932. Winners are listed first and highlighted in boldface.

**Outstanding Production**: **Grand Hotel** **– Irving Thalberg for Metro-Goldwyn-Mayer**; Arrowsmith – Samuel Goldwyn for Samuel Goldwyn Prod.; Bad Girl – Winfield Sheehan for Fox Film Corp.; The Champ – King Vidor for Metro-Goldwyn-Mayer; Five Star Final – Hal B. Wallis for First National; One Hour with You – Ernst Lubitsch for Paramount Publix; Shanghai Express – Adolph Zukor for Paramount Publix; The Smiling Lieutenant – Ernst Lubitsch for Paramount Publix	**Best Director**: **Frank Borzage – Bad Girl**; King Vidor – The Champ; Josef von Sternberg – Shanghai Express
**Best Actor**: **Fredric March – Dr. Jekyll and Mr. Hyde as Dr Henry Jekyll/Mr Edward Hyde**; **Wallace Beery – The Champ as Champ**; Alfred Lunt – The Guardsman as The Actor	**Best Actress**: **Helen Hayes – The Sin of Madelon Claudet as Madelon Claudet**; Marie Dressler – Emma as Emma Thatcher Smith; Lynn Fontanne – The Guardsman as The Actress
**Best Original Story**: **The Champ – Frances Marion**; Lady and Gent – Grover Jones and William Slavens McNutt; The Star Witness – Lucien Hubbard; What Price Hollywood? – Adela Rogers St. Johns and Jane Murfin	**Best Adaptation**: **Bad Girl – Edwin J. Burke, based on the novel and play by Viña Delmar**; Arrowsmith – Sidney Howard, based on the novel by Sinclair Lewis; Dr. Jekyll and Mr. Hyde – Percy Heath and Samuel Hoffenstein, based on Strange Case of Dr. Jekyll and Mr. Hyde by Robert Louis Stevenson
**Best Live Action Short Subject, Comedy**: **The Music Box – Hal Roach**; The Loud Mouth – Mack Sennett; Scratch-As-Catch-Can – RKO Radio	**Best Live Action Short Subject, Novelty**: **Wrestling Swordfish – Mack Sennett**; Screen Souvenirs – Paramount Publix; Swing High – Metro-Goldwyn-Mayer
**Best Short Subject, Cartoon**: **Flowers and Trees – Walt Disney, Walt Disney Productions, United Artists**; It's Got Me Again! – Leon Schlesinger, Warner Bros.; Mickey's Orphans – Walt Disney, Walt Disney Productions, Columbia Pictures	**Best Sound Recording**: **Paramount Publix Studio Sound Department**; MGM Studio Sound Department; RKO Radio Studio Sound Department; Warner Bros. First National Studio Sound Department
**Best Art Direction**: **Transatlantic – Gordon Wiles**; À Nous la Liberté – Lazare Meerson; Arrowsmith – Richard Day	**Best Cinematography**: **Shanghai Express – Lee Garmes**; Arrowsmith – Ray June; Dr. Jekyll and Mr. Hyde – Karl Struss

=== Special Award ===
- To Walt Disney for the creation of Mickey Mouse.

== Multiple nominations and awards ==
Films with multiple nominations
Nominations	Film
4	Arrowsmith
4	The Champ
3	Bad Girl
3	Shanghai Express
3	Dr. Jekyll and Mr. Hyde
2	The Guardsman

Films with multiple wins
Wins	Film
2	Bad Girl
2	The Champ

== See also ==
- 1931 in film
- 1932 in film
