= Strikes and Spares =

1934 American short sports film

- Film poster
- Directed by: Felix E. Feist
- Produced by: Pete Smith
- Starring: Pete Smith; Andy Varipapa
- Narrated by: Pete Smith
- Distributed by: MGM
- Release date: October 20, 1934
- Running time: 9 minutes
- Country: United States
- Language: English

Strikes and Spares is a 1934 American short sports film directed by Felix E. Feist and starring Pete Smith and Andy Varipapa. In 1934, it was nominated for an Academy Award for Best Short Subject (Novelty) at the 7th Academy Awards.

== Synopsis ==
The short begins with Andy Varipapa and an unidentified woman bowling on a two lane bowling alley. Varipapa gets in a number of strikes, as well as a 1-7-10 split, while the woman makes a spare, then a strike. Varipapa is then introduced as "the boast of Brooklyn". Then some bowling tips are presented: all ways keep your fingers dry, different ways to hold a bowling ball, how to use bowling shoes etc. Varipapa's good bowling is contrasted with that of a "beginner", a bald headed man who makes rookie mistakes and gets into humorous situations. An African-American pin boy, Sunshine, makes occasional appearances.

Varipapa shows several trick plays including using two balls, hitting diagonally arranged pins and finally rolling a ball under the legs of a troop of chorus girls.

== Cast ==
- Pete Smith as narrator (voice)
- Andy Varipapa as himself - World's Greatest Bowling Fixture
- Buster Brodie as Little Bald-Headed Man (uncredited)
- Ray Turner as Sunshine, the Pin Boy (uncredited)
