= 1938 Academy Awards =

1938 Academy Awards may refer to:

- 10th Academy Awards, the Academy Awards ceremony that took place in 1938
- 11th Academy Awards, the 1939 ceremony honoring the best in film for 1938
