= Menu (film) =

1933 film

- Directed by: Nick Grinde
- Written by: Thorne Smith
- Produced by: Pete Smith
- Starring: Pete Smith; Luis Alberni; Una Merkel
- Narrated by: Pete Smith
- Music by: William Axt
- Color process: Technicolor
- Distributed by: Metro-Goldwyn-Mayer
- Release date: September 23, 1933
- Running time: 10 minutes
- Country: United States
- Language: English

Menu is a 1933 American pre-Code short comedy film directed by Nick Grinde, produced by Pete Smith, and filmed in Technicolor. The film was nominated for an Academy Award at the 6th Academy Awards in 1933 for Best Short Subject (Novelty). This could be considered a "prequel" to the MGM short film Penny Wisdom (1937), also produced by Pete Smith.

== Plot ==
The scene opens with John Xavier Omsk drinking some bicarbonate of soda in the privacy of his office. Pete Smith, as the narrator, diagnoses John's stomach trouble as a "simple case of bad cooking." As the scene transitions to Mrs. Omsk in a disheveled kitchen, Smith's diagnosis is offered confirmation. Frustrated with her attempts to follow a cookbook on "How to Stuff a Duck", Mrs. Omsk throws down the book and beats the frozen duck, which surprisingly quacks each time it's struck.

Smith decides to help the inept Mrs. Omsk by conjuring up Bizetti, a Master Chef, to show her how to cook. Unable to work in such messy surroundings, Bizetti accepts Smith's offer to tidy up by reversing the scene back to the spotless, organized kitchen before Mrs. Omsk's culinary attempts. Smith's uncanny film-editing magic of replacing the old frozen duck with a better one surprises Mrs. Omsk and excites Bizetti, who cleans the duck, stuffs it and sews it up. As the duck cooks in the oven, Bizetti shows Mrs. Omsk how to fix her husband's favorite dessert, baked apples.

Smith then causes Bizetti to disappear, leaving Mrs. Omsk alone again in the kitchen and all prepared to satisfy her husband with an appetizing meal.

== Cast ==
- Pete Smith as Narrator (voice)
- Luis Alberni as Bizetti, the Master Chef (uncredited)
- Una Merkel as Mrs. Omsk (uncredited)
- Franklin Pangborn as John Xavier Omsk (uncredited)
