= Swing High (disambiguation) =

Swing High may refer to:

- Swing High (1930 film), American pre-Code musical
- Swing High (1932 film), American one-reel Pete Smith Specialty

== See also ==
- Swing High, Swing Low (disambiguation)
