= Audioscopiks =

1935 film

- Film poster
- Directed by: Jacob Leventhal; John Norling
- Produced by: Pete Smith
- Narrated by: Pete Smith
- Distributed by: Metro-Goldwyn-Mayer
- Release date: December 26, 1935
- Running time: 8 minutes
- Country: United States
- Language: English

Audioscopiks is a 1935 American short documentary film directed by Jacob F. Leventhal and John A. Norling. The main point of the short was to show off 3-D film technology. The film was nominated for an Academy Award at the 8th Academy Awards in 1935 for Best Short Subject (Novelty).

This was MGM's first film in 3-D, filmed using the red-green anaglyph process, with prints produced by Technicolor. Current prints appear to have faded to a crimson-cyan color, causing ghosting to occur when viewed. Audioscopiks was followed by The New Audioscopiks (1938), and by Third Dimensional Murder (1941).

== Synopsis ==
Audience members are given a lesson on how 3-Dimensional movies are made. After being taught about 3-D, patrons are then instructed to put on their 3-D glasses. They are then given a demonstration of 3-D with various objects moving towards the camera, including a ladder, a baseball being thrown and a woman on a swing. Smith narrates each short clip, most being 20 seconds or less.

== Cast ==
- Pete Smith as Narrator (voice)
