= 10th Academy Awards =

- Date: March 10, 1938
- Site: Biltmore Hotel
- Hosted by: Bob Burns

Highlights
- Best Picture: The Life of Emile Zola
- Most awards: The Life of Emile Zola (3)
- Most nominations: The Life of Emile Zola (10)

The 10th Academy Awards were held on March 10, 1938, to honor films released in 1937, at the Biltmore Hotel in Los Angeles, California and hosted by Bob Burns. Originally scheduled for March 3, 1938, the ceremony was postponed due to the Los Angeles flood of 1938.

This was the last year for two Oscars categories: Best Dance Direction, which this year saw the only nomination ever received by a Marx Brothers film (Dave Gould for "All God's Children Got Rhythm" in A Day at the Races), and Best Assistant Director.

The Life of Emile Zola was the first film to receive ten nominations and the second consecutive biographical film to win Best Picture, following the previous year's The Great Ziegfeld. Luise Rainer received the Academy Award for Best Actress for The Good Earth, earning her the distinctions of being the first actor to win two Academy Awards and the first to win consecutive acting awards, following her win for The Great Ziegfeld. Luise Rainer, who didn't think anyone could win in two consecutive years, stayed at home with her husband, playwright Clifford Odets, on the night of the ceremony. She was informed of her win by telephone, hastily dressed herself up, and rushed out the door to collect her second Oscar, which was said to have "jinxed her".

A Star Is Born was the first color film to receive a Best Picture nomination.

Walt Disney's Snow White and the Seven Dwarfs, the world's first full-length Technicolor animated feature film with sound and widely seen as one of the greatest motion pictures of all time, received only one nomination, for Best Original Score. The following year, the Academy presented Disney an Honorary Academy Award (consisting of one full-size Oscar statuette and seven miniature statuettes on a stepped base) "for creating Snow White and the Seven Dwarfs [1937], recognized as a significant screen innovation which has charmed millions and pioneered a great new entertainment field for the motion picture cartoon". This is a rare case of a film being recognized in two successive ceremonies.

This was the first year in which every film nominated for Best Picture received multiple nominations.

== Winners and nominees ==
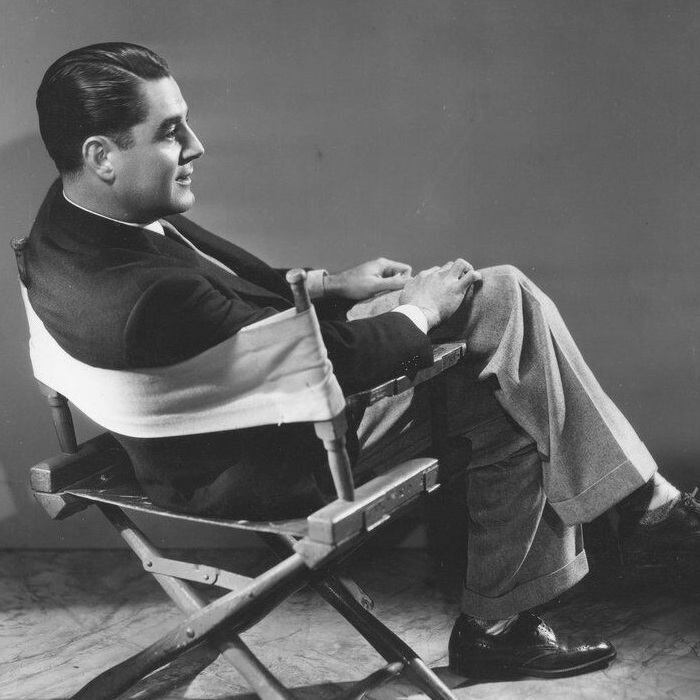
Leo McCarey, Best Director winner

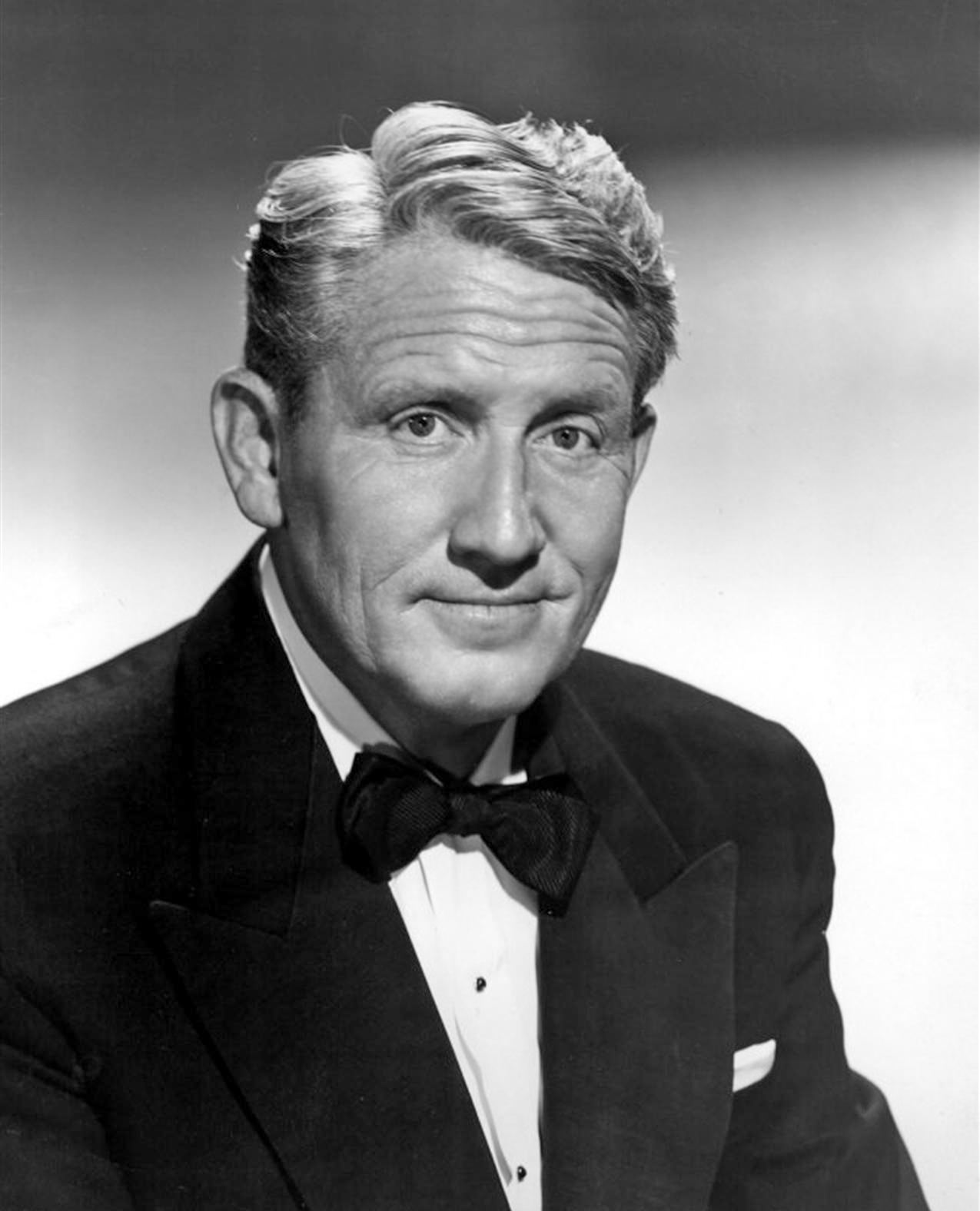
Spencer Tracy; Best Actor winner

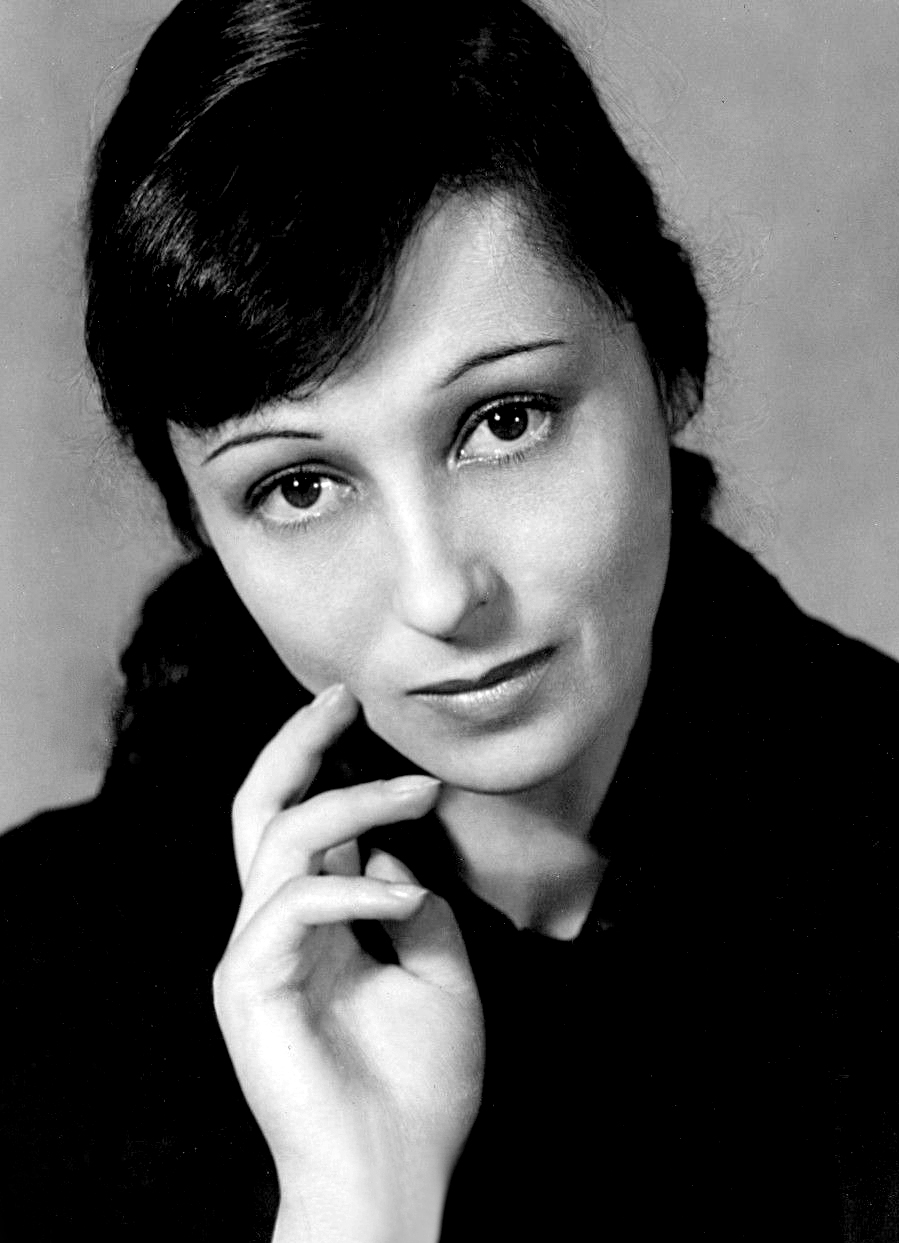
Luise Rainer; Best Actress winner

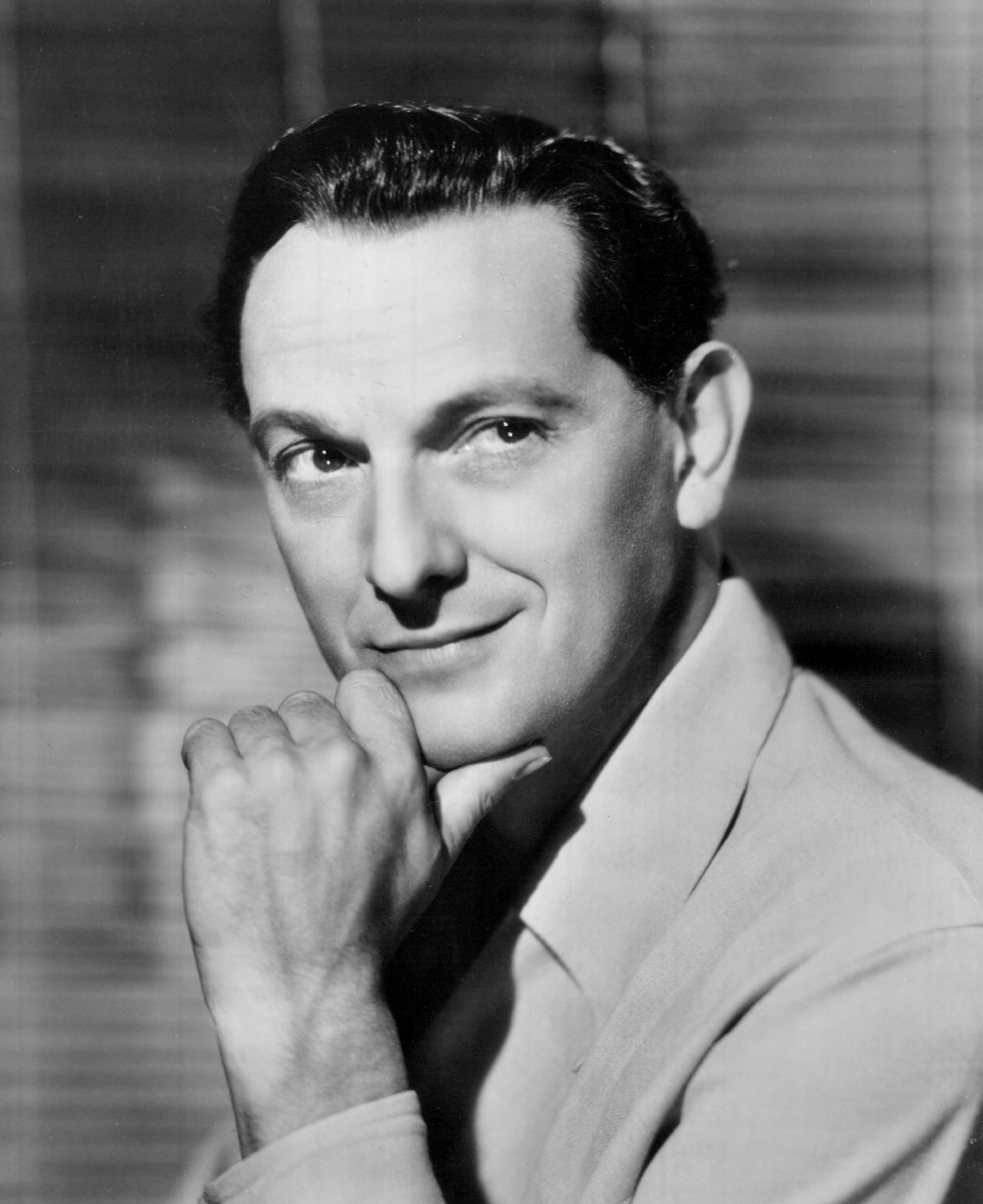
Joseph Schildkraut; Best Supporting Actor winner

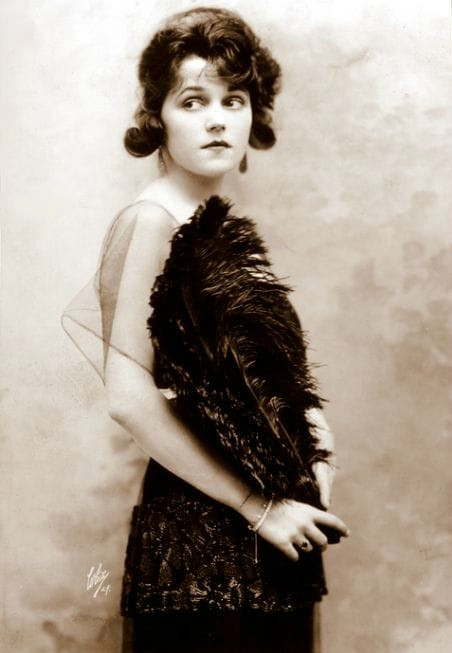
Alice Brady; Best Supporting Actress winner

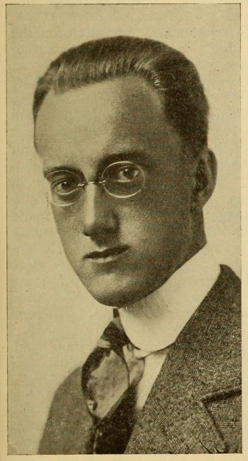
Pete Smith; Best Live Action Short Subject, Color co-winner

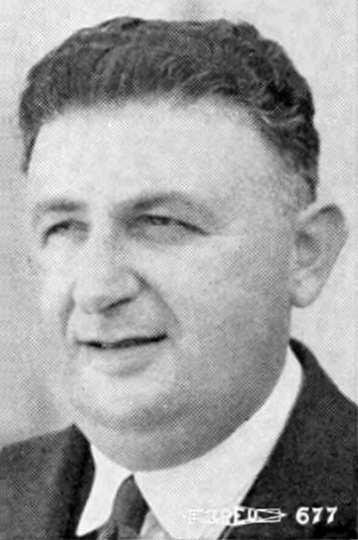
Karl Freund; Best Cinematography winner

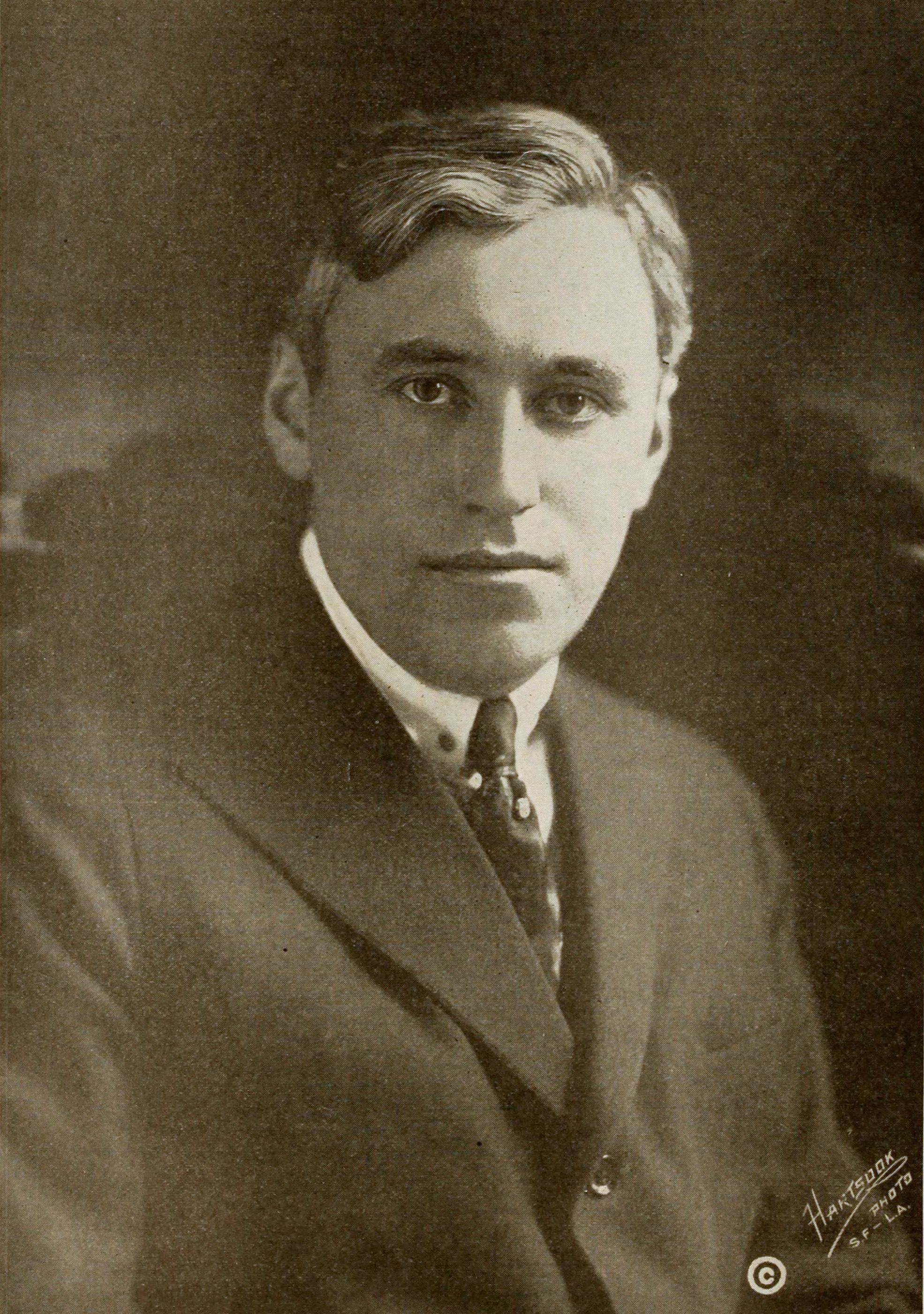
Mack Sennett; Honorary Academy Award recipient

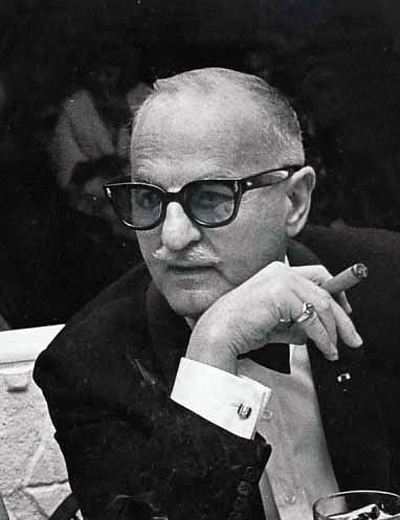
Darryl F. Zanuck; Irving G. Thalberg Memorial Award recipient

=== Awards ===
Nominations announced on February 6, 1938. Winners are listed first and highlighted in boldface.

| **Outstanding Production**: **The Life of Emile Zola** **– Henry Blanke for Warner Bros.**; The Awful Truth – Leo McCarey and Everett Riskin for Columbia; Captains Courageous – Louis D. Lighton for Metro-Goldwyn-Mayer; Dead End – Samuel Goldwyn and Merritt Hulbert for Samuel Goldwyn Prod. and United Artists; The Good Earth – Irving Thalberg and Albert Lewin for Metro-Goldwyn-Mayer; In Old Chicago – Darryl F. Zanuck and Kenneth Macgowan for 20th Century Fox; Lost Horizon – Frank Capra for Columbia; One Hundred Men and a Girl – Charles R. Rogers and Joe Pasternak for Universal; Stage Door – Pandro S. Berman for RKO Radio; A Star Is Born – David O. Selznick for Selznick International and United Artists | **Best Directing**: **Leo McCarey – The Awful Truth**; Sidney Franklin – The Good Earth; William Dieterle – The Life of Emile Zola; Gregory La Cava – Stage Door; William Wellman – A Star Is Born |
| **Best Actor**: **Spencer Tracy – Captains Courageous as Manuel Fidello**; Charles Boyer – Conquest as Napoleon Bonaparte; Fredric March – A Star Is Born as Norman Maine; Robert Montgomery – Night Must Fall as Danny; Paul Muni – The Life of Emile Zola as Émile Zola | **Best Actress**: **Luise Rainer – The Good Earth as O-Lan**; Irene Dunne – The Awful Truth as Lucy Warriner; Greta Garbo – Camille as Marguerite Gautier; Janet Gaynor – A Star Is Born as Esther Blodgett/Vicki Lester; Barbara Stanwyck – Stella Dallas as Stella Dallas |
| **Best Actor in a Supporting Role**: **Joseph Schildkraut – The Life of Emile Zola as Alfred Dreyfus**; Ralph Bellamy – The Awful Truth as Dan Leeson; Thomas Mitchell – The Hurricane as Dr. Kersaint; H. B. Warner – Lost Horizon as Chang; Roland Young – Topper as Cosmo Topper | **Best Actress in a Supporting Role**: **Alice Brady – In Old Chicago as Molly O'Leary**; Andrea Leeds – Stage Door as Kay Hamilton; Anne Shirley – Stella Dallas as Laurel Dallas; Claire Trevor – Dead End as Francey; May Whitty – Night Must Fall as Mrs Bramson |
| **Best Writing (Original Story)**: **A Star Is Born – William A. Wellman and Robert Carson**; Black Legion – Robert Lord; In Old Chicago – Niven Busch; The Life of Emile Zola – Heinz Herald and Geza Herczeg; One Hundred Men and a Girl – Hanns Kräly | **Best Writing (Screenplay)**: **The Life of Emile Zola** – **Heinz Herald, Geza Herczeg, and Norman Reilly Raine, based on Zola and His Time by Matthew Josephson**; The Awful Truth – Viña Delmar, based on the play by Arthur Richman; Captains Courageous – John Lee Mahin, Marc Connelly, and Dale Van Every, based on the novel by Rudyard Kipling; Stage Door – Morris Ryskind and Anthony Veiller, based on the play by Edna Ferber and George S. Kaufman; A Star Is Born – Alan Campbell, Robert Carson, and Dorothy Parker, based on a story by William A. Wellman and Robert Carson |
| **Best Short Subject (One-Reel)**: **The Private Life of the Gannets – Skibo Productions and Educational**; A Night at the Movies – MGM; Romance of Radium – Pete Smith and MGM | **Best Short Subject (Two-Reel)**: **Torture Money – MGM**; Deep South – RKO Radio; Should Wives Work? – RKO Radio |
| **Best Short Subject (Color)**: **Penny Wisdom – Pete Smith and MGM**; The Man Without a Country – Warner Bros.; Popular Science J-7-1 – Paramount | **Best Short Subject (Cartoon)**: **The Old Mill – Walt Disney Productions and RKO Radio**; Educated Fish – Paramount; The Little Match Girl – Charles Mintz and Columbia |
| **Best Music (Scoring)**: **One Hundred Men and a Girl – Universal Studio Music Department**; The Hurricane – Goldwyn Studio Music Department; In Old Chicago – 20th Century Fox Studio Music Department; The Life of Emile Zola – Warner Bros. Studio Music Department; Lost Horizon – Columbia Studio Music Department; Make a Wish – Principal Productions; Maytime – MGM Studio Music Department; Portia on Trial – Republic Studio Music Department; The Prisoner of Zenda – Selznick International Pictures Music Department; Quality Street – RKO Radio Studio Music Department; Snow White and the Seven Dwarfs – Walt Disney Studio Music Department; Something to Sing About – Grand National Studio Music Department; Souls at Sea – Paramount Studio Music Department; Way Out West – Hal Roach Studio Music Department | **Best Music (Song)**: **"Sweet Leilani" from Waikiki Wedding – Music and Lyrics by Harry Owens**; "Remember Me" from Mr. Dodd Takes the Air – Music by Harry Warren; Lyrics by Al Dubin; "That Old Feeling" from Walter Wanger's Vogues of 1938 – Music by Sammy Fain; Lyrics by Lew Brown; "They Can't Take That Away From Me" from Shall We Dance – Music by George Gershwin (posthumous nomination); Lyrics by Ira Gershwin; "Whispers in the Dark" from Artists and Models – Music by Frederick Hollander; Lyrics by Leo Robin |
| **Best Sound Recording**: **The Hurricane – Thomas T. Moulton**; The Girl Said No – A. E. Kaye; Hitting a New High – John Aalberg; In Old Chicago – E. H. Hansen; The Life of Emile Zola – Nathan Levinson; Lost Horizon – John P. Livadary; Maytime – Douglas Shearer; One Hundred Men and a Girl – Homer G. Tasker; Topper – Elmer A. Raguse; Wells Fargo – Loren L. Ryder | **Best Dance Direction**: **A Damsel in Distress – Hermes Pan**; Ali Baba Goes to Town – Sammy Lee; A Day at the Races – Dave Gould; Ready, Willing and Able – Bobby Connolly; Thin Ice – Harry Losee; Varsity Show – Busby Berkeley; Waikiki Wedding – LeRoy Prinz |
| **Best Assistant Director**: **In Old Chicago – Robert Webb**; Lost Horizon – C. C. Coleman Jr.; The Life of Emile Zola – Russ Saunders; Souls at Sea – Hal Walker; A Star Is Born – Eric G. Stacey | **Best Art Direction**: **Lost Horizon – Stephen Goosson**; Conquest – Cedric Gibbons and William A. Horning; A Damsel in Distress – Carroll Clark; Dead End – Richard Day; Every Day's a Holiday – Wiard Ihnen; The Life of Emile Zola – Anton Grot; Manhattan Merry-Go-Round – John Victor Mackay; The Prisoner of Zenda – Lyle R. Wheeler; Souls at Sea – Hans Dreier and Roland Anderson; Walter Wanger's Vogues of 1938 – Alexander Toluboff; Wee Willie Winkie – William S. Darling and David S. Hall; You're a Sweetheart – Jack Otterson |
| **Best Cinematography**: **The Good Earth – Karl Freund**; Dead End – Gregg Toland; Wings over Honolulu – Joseph Valentine | **Best Film Editing**: **Lost Horizon – Gene Havlick and Gene Milford**; The Awful Truth – Al Clark; Captains Courageous – Elmo Veron; The Good Earth – Basil Wrangell; One Hundred Men and a Girl – Bernard W. Burton |

=== Special awards ===
- To Mack Sennett, for his lasting contribution to the comedy technique of the screen, the basic principles of which are as important today as when they were first put into practice, the Academy presents a Special Award to that master of fun, discoverer of stars, sympathetic, kindly, understanding comedy genius - Mack Sennett.
- To Edgar Bergen for his outstanding comedy creation, Charlie McCarthy.
- To The Museum of Modern Art Film Library for its significant work in collecting films dating from 1895 to the present and for the first time making available to the public the means of studying the historical and aesthetic development of the motion picture as one of the major arts.
- To W. Howard Greene for the color photography of A Star Is Born.

=== Irving G. Thalberg Memorial Award ===
- Darryl F. Zanuck

== Multiple nominations and awards ==
Films with multiple nominations
| Nominations | Film |
|---|---|
| 10 | The Life of Emile Zola |
| 7 | Lost Horizon |
| 7 | A Star Is Born |
| 6 | The Awful Truth |
| 6 | In Old Chicago |
| 5 | The Good Earth |
| 5 | One Hundred Men and a Girl |
| 4 | Captains Courageous |
| 4 | Dead End |
| 4 | Stage Door |
| 3 | The Hurricane |
| 3 | Souls at Sea |
| 2 | Conquest |
| 2 | A Damsel in Distress |
| 2 | Maytime |
| 2 | Night Must Fall |
| 2 | The Prisoner of Zenda |
| 2 | Stella Dallas |
| 2 | Waikiki Wedding |
| 2 | Topper |
| 2 | Walter Wanger's Vogues of 1938 |

Films with multiple awards
| Awards | Film |
|---|---|
| 3 | The Life of Emile Zola |
| 2 | The Good Earth |
| 2 | In Old Chicago |
| 2 | Lost Horizon |

== See also ==
- 1937 in film
