= Tuba Atlantic =

- Film poster
- Directed by: Hallvar Witzø
- Written by: Linn-Jeanethe Kyed
- Produced by: Gudrun Austli
- Starring: David Chocron, Edvard Hægstad, Terje Ranes, Ingrid Viken
- Cinematography: Karl Erik Brøndbo
- Edited by: Vesa Happonen
- Release date: October 1, 2010
- Running time: 25 minutes
- Country: Norway
- Language: Norwegian

Tuba Atlantic is a Norwegian short film directed by Hallvar Witzø.

The film follows a 70-year-old man who has six days to live, and wants to reconcile with his brother after a lifetime of disagreement. When Inger, his local "Angel of Death" comes to help him reach happiness in his final days, he is given his opportunity.

The film was a nominee at the 84th Academy Awards in the category Best Live Action Short Film, but the nomination was rescinded a few months after the ceremony because the film had been shown on television before its theatrical release, contrary to Academy eligibility rules. The Norwegian newspaper Aftenposten reported, a few days after the Oscars award ceremony on February 26, 2012, that the producers of Tuba Atlantic who submitted the film for consideration by the Academy had checked "no" in response to the question whether the film had been shown on television. The film's director, Hallvar Witzø, told Aftenposten that the Academy had been aware of the television showing, but a spokesperson for the Academy said that the Academy had not known about it.
