= Should Wives Work? =

1937 film

- Directed by: Leslie Goodwins
- Written by: Leslie Goodwins; George Jeske
- Produced by: Bert Gilroy
- Starring: Leon Errol; Vivien Oakland
- Edited by: Les Millbrook
- Distributed by: RKO
- Release date: September 10, 1937
- Running time: 20 minutes
- Country: United States
- Language: English

Should Wives Work? is a 1937 American short comedy film directed by Leslie Goodwins. In 1937, at the 10th Academy Awards, it was nominated for an Academy Award for Best Short Subject (Two-Reel).

== Cast ==
- Leon Errol as Leon Errol
- Vivien Oakland as Mrs. Errol
- Richard Lane
- William Brisbane
- Laurette Puck
- Isabel La Mal
- Harry Bowen
