= Swing High, Swing Low =

Swing High, Swing Low may refer to:

- "Swing High, Swing Low" (song), 1937 American R&B song by Ralph Freed and Burton Lane, recorded by The Ink Spots
- Swing High, Swing Low (film), 1937 American romantic comedy drama starring Carole Lombard and Fred MacMurray
- Swing High, Swing Low (album), 1991 compilation album by American early R&B group The Ink Spots

== See also ==
- Swing High (disambiguation)
