= Amphibious Fighters =

1943 film

- Directed by: Jack Eaton
- Produced by: Jack Eaton; Grantland Rice
- Starring: Ted Husing
- Distributed by: Paramount Pictures
- Release date: 1943
- Running time: 10 minutes
- Country: United States
- Language: English

Amphibious Fighters is a 1943 short directed by Jack Eaton. In 1944, it won an Oscar for Best Short Subject (One-Reel) at the 16th Academy Awards.

== Cast ==
- Ted Husing as himself, Narrator
