= Romance of Radium =

1937 film directed by Jacques Tourneur

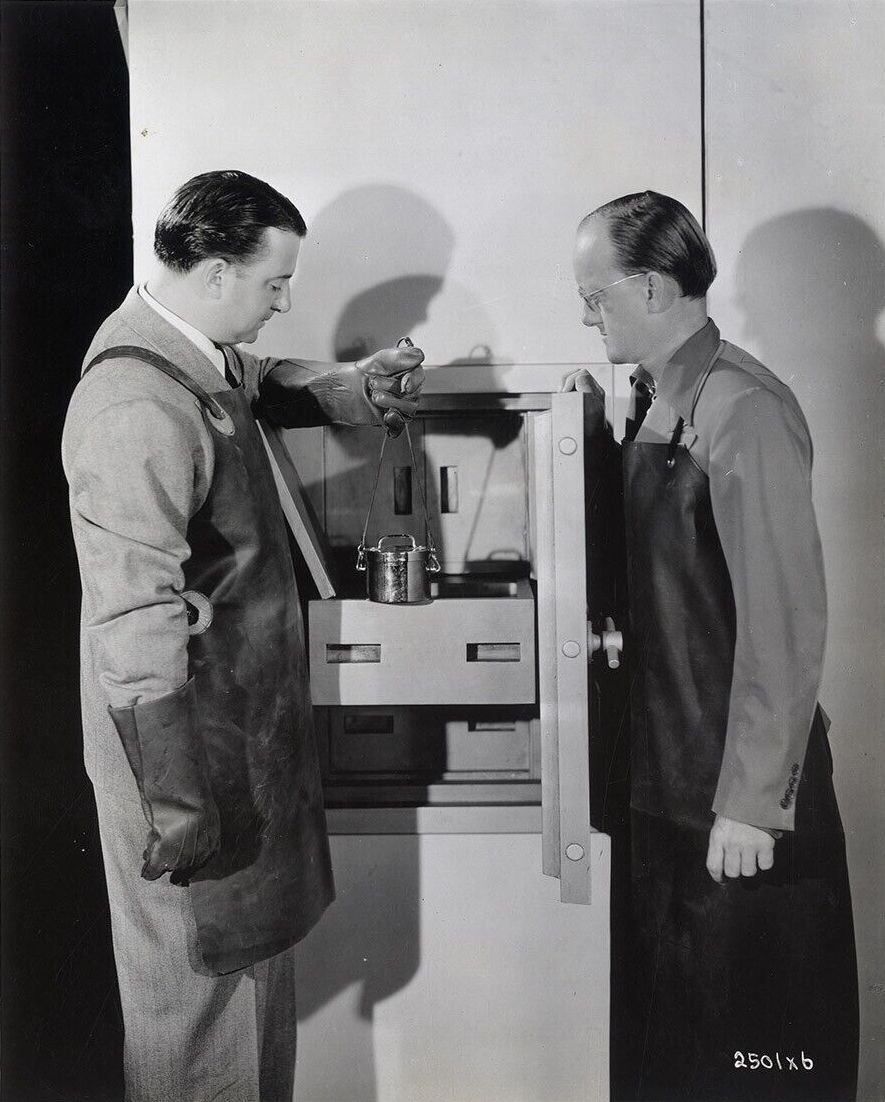
- Jacques Tourneur and Pete Smith prepare to take a platinum case of radium to be photographed by a motion picture camera for the first time in Romance of Radium
- Directed by: Jacques Tourneur
- Written by: Richard Goldstone; N. Gayle Gitterman
- Produced by: Pete Smith
- Starring: André Cheron; Eddie Hart
- Narrated by: Pete Smith
- Distributed by: Metro-Goldwyn-Mayer
- Release date: October 23, 1937
- Running time: 10 minutes
- Country: United States
- Language: English

Romance of Radium is a 1937 American short film directed by Jacques Tourneur, and released by Metro-Goldwyn-Mayer. A brief history of the chemical element, it was nominated for an Academy Award for Best Short Subject (One-Reel) at the 10th Academy Awards.

== Cast ==
- André Cheron as Henri Becquerel (uncredited)
- Eddie Hart as Photographer (uncredited)
- Pete Smith as Narrator (voice) (uncredited)
- Emmett Vogan as Pierre Curie (uncredited)
