= Seeing Hands =

1943 film

- Directed by: Gunther von Fritsch
- Written by: Joe Ansen
- Produced by: Pete Smith
- Starring: Barbara Bedford; William Bishop; Robert Frazer
- Cinematography: Lester White
- Edited by: Philip W. Anderson
- Music by: Max Terr
- Distributed by: Metro-Goldwyn-Mayer
- Release date: July 3, 1943
- Running time: 11 minutes
- Country: United States
- Language: English

Seeing Hands is a 1943 American short film. It tells the story of Benjamin Charles Helwig, who was blinded in his late teens but became a valued employee at an American World War II manufacturing plant, machining and inspecting precision parts. (Note: Seeing Hands (1943). Gunther von Fritsch, director.) Directed by Gunther von Fritsch, the film was nominated for an Academy Award at the 16th Academy Awards for Best Short Subject (One-Reel).

This short film shows how a young Benjamin Helwig was given over to a boys home in the 1930's by his mother. Remember that this was during the days of the depression in the United States. He got along well with the other boys. One day, while playing a game of stick ball (it was a poor boys version of baseball since they lacked proper equipment), he is struck in his eye by accident. After a couple of operations, the doctors were unable to save his eye. Unfortunately, he also lost eyesight in his other eye although the film does not explain quite why this happened.

One day while recuperating, his mother was visiting him trying to keep his spirits up. She brought him a model airplane which he had been so fond of and which he had always said he could put together in the dark. He adeptly put the model together, much to his mother's delight.

One day, as a young man and evidently productive citizen, he stopped by the boys home where he had spent many happy times as a child despite his circumstances, and visited his former instructor. This instructor surprised him with the gift of a guide dog.

One night shortly after the United States' entry into Work War II, two men were passing by his home and heard sounds coming from its garage and entered to see what was happening inside. There they found Benjamin working at a machine and realized he was blind but was quite the agile woodworker.

The two men turn out to be brothers who run a machine shop that makes machinery used in the war effort. They realize that Benjamin would be quite an asset, with the proper training, to their factory and Benjamin Helwig becomes a valuable worker at the company.

== Cast ==
- Barbara Bedford as Ben's Mother (uncredited)
- William Bishop as Man Pulling Lamp Cord (uncredited)
- Robert Frazer as John Downin (uncredited)
- Russell Gleason as adult Ben Helwig (uncredited)
- George 'Spanky' McFarland as "Fatty” leading initiation (uncredited)
- Pete Smith, narrator of short (uncredited)
