= Hallvar Witzø =

Norwegian film director (born 1984)

- Born: 1984 (age 40–41)
- Occupation: Film director

Hallvar Witzø (born 1984) is a Norwegian film director. Witzø grew up in the village of Leksvik in central Norway. He studied film directing at Lillehammer's Norwegian Film School, graduating in 2010.

In 2012, he was nominated for the Academy Award for Best Live Action Short Film for the film Tuba Atlantic. However, the nomination was later revoked after the Academy learned that the film was broadcast on television in 2010.
