= Light in the Window =

1952 film

- Directed by: Jean Oser
- Produced by: Boris Vermont
- Distributed by: Twentieth Century Fox
- Release date: September 1952
- Running time: 10 minutes
- Country: United States
- Language: English

Light in the Window (also known as Light in the Window: The Art of Vermeer) is a 1952 short film directed by Jean Oser. It won an Oscar in 1953 for Best Short Subject (One-Reel).
