= Boris Vermont =

American film producer and film editor

Boris Vermont (August 3, 1903, Russian Empire – June 25, 1956, New York City) was a Russian-born American film producer and film editor. He was an official of Twentieth Century-Fox Film Corporation. He is best remembered for his short film Light in the Window (1952) for which he was awarded the Academy Award for Best Live Action Short Film and was also nominated the following year for Joy of Life (1953).

== Career ==
Originally from Russia, Vermont first worked as editor of the five-minute short documentary film The Tree in a Test Tube with Stan Laurel and Oliver Hardy, directed by Charles McDonald in 1943. In 1947 he produced the first of three short films with Alaska.

For his second short film Light in the Window (1952) he was awarded the Oscar for best short film ("One Reel") at the 1953 Academy Awards. The ten-minute film, directed by Jean Oser, portrays something of the art of the Dutch baroque painter Jan Vermeer, as can be seen from the additional title The Art of Vermeer.

With his third and last short film, Vermont was again nominated for the Oscar for best short film ("One Reel") in 1952, this time for the short film Joy of Living (1953), also directed by Jean Oser, in which now under the subtitle The Art of Renoir depicts the art of the impressionist painter Pierre-Auguste Renoir.

== Personal life ==
Vermont was married to screenwriter Mildred Barish. The two had one child.
