= Jack Eaton =

American film producer (1888–1968)

- Born: June 16, 1888
- Died: December 4, 1968 (aged 80); Mystic, Connecticut
- Occupations: Film producer, film director
- Years active: 1918–1953

Jack Eaton (June 16, 1888 – December 4, 1968) was an American film producer and director. He produced 78 films between 1918 and 1953. He also directed 38 films between 1918 and 1953. He was nominated for five Academy Awards, all for Best Short Subject, winning once, in 1950, for Aquatic House Party. He died in Mystic, Connecticut. Eaton's short film White Rhapsody was preserved by the Academy Film Archive, in conjunction with the UCLA Film and Television Archive, in 2013.

== Selected filmography ==
- Amphibious Fighters (1943)
- Aquatic House Party (1949)
