= Third Dimensional Murder =

- Directed by: George Sidney
- Written by: Jerry Hoffman
- Produced by: Pete Smith
- Starring: Pete Smith; Ed Payson
- Narrated by: Pete Smith
- Cinematography: Walter Lundin (director of photography); B.C. Parker (camera operator)
- Edited by: Phillip W. Anderson
- Music by: David Snell (uncredited)
- Production company: Metro-Goldwyn-Mayer
- Distributed by: Loew's Inc.
- Release date: March 1, 1941
- Running time: 8 minutes
- Country: United States
- Language: English

Third Dimensional Murder (also known as Murder in 3-D) is a 3D short comedy film produced and narrated by Pete Smith and released by Metro-Goldwyn-Mayer in 1941. It is the last of the Audioscopiks 3D short film series, after Audioscopiks (1936) and The New Audioscopiks (1938).

== Synopsis ==
Pete Smith tells his harrowing story of one evening at midnight being alerted by a telephone call from his Aunt Tilly in distress at the old deserted Smith mansion. The man drove the two hours to the isolated mansion to find that it was haunted by various creatures after him. Smith is attacked by a witch, a skeleton, an Indian warrior, an archer, and Frankenstein's monster (Ed Payson). The latter character was specifically modeled after Boris Karloff in Son of Frankenstein. The question becomes how the man escapes and saves his aunt... if he does indeed.

== Background ==
The third and last in the Pete Smith Audioscopiks 3D series of shorts, Third Dimensional Murder used footage shot specifically for it, unlike the previous two shorts which utilized test footage shot by Jacob Leventhal and Jack Norling.

With the success of the first two shorts, Smith consulted J.M. Nikolaus in the camera department at MGM. Nikolaus went to studio manager E. J. Mannix who gave Nikolaus a budget of "about $3,000" to create a stereoscopic camera rig. After some trial and error, Nickolaus created a camera using two Bell & Howell 35mm cameras with specially matched lenses made by Bauch and Lomb. The lenses were 2¾ inches apart and were shot into prisms. George Sidney directed the short. (Sidney later directed the 3-D feature for MGM, Kiss Me Kate.)

As with the two previous Audioscopiks short films, the prints were in red-green anaglyph by Technicolor. This film opens in 2-D color, with a young woman showing how to hold the 3-D viewer. Prints for the two earlier films were also made by Technicolor to achieve the red-green anaglyph prints necessary for 3-D projection.
