= Academy Award for Best Live Action Short Film =

Film award

- Country: United States
- Presented by: Academy of Motion Picture Arts and Sciences (AMPAS)
- First award: November 18, 1932; 93 years ago (for films released during the 1931/1932 film season)
- Most recent winner: Sam A. Davis and Jack Piatt; The Singers and Alexandre Singh and Natalie Musteata; Two People Exchanging Saliva (2025)
- Website: oscars.org

The Academy Award for Best Live Action Short Film is an award presented at the annual Academy Awards ceremony. The award has existed, under numerous names, since 1957.

From 1936 until 1956 there were two separate awards, Best Short Subject, One-reel and Best Short Subject, Two-reel, referring to the running time of eligible short films: a standard reel of 35 mm film is 1000 feet, or about 11 minutes of run time. A third category "Best Short Subject, color" was used only for 1936 and 1937. From the initiation of short subject awards for 1932 until 1935 the terms were "Best Short Subject, comedy" and "Best Short Subject, novelty".

These categories were merged starting with the 1957 awards, under the name "Short Subjects, Live Action Subjects", which was used until 1970. For the next three years after that, it was known as "Short Subjects, Live Action Films". The current name for the Academy Award for Live Action Short Film was introduced in 1974.

Current Academy rules call for the award to be presented to "the individual person most directly responsible for the concept and the creative execution of the film. In the event that more than one individual has been directly and importantly involved in creative decisions, a second statuette may be awarded". The Academy defines short as being "not more than 40 minutes, including all credits". Fifteen films are shortlisted before nominations are announced.

== List of winners and nominees ==
=== 1930s ===
Year	Film	Nominees
1931–32 (5th) (Note: RKO Radio was announced as a nominee for Stout Hearts and Willing Hands in Best Short Subject (Comedy), but the nomination was disqualified and replaced with RKO's Scratch-As-Catch-Can. The reason for the disqualification is unknown.)	Comedy	
1931–32 (5th)	The Music Box	Hal Roach
1931–32 (5th)	The Loud Mouth	Mack Sennett
1931–32 (5th)	Scratch-As-Catch-Can	RKO Radio
1931–32 (5th)	Novelty	
1931–32 (5th)	Wrestling Swordfish	Mack Sennett
1931–32 (5th)	Screen Souvenirs	Paramount Publix
1931–32 (5th)	Swing High	Metro-Goldwyn-Mayer
1932–33 (6th)
1932–33 (6th)	Comedy	
1932–33 (6th)	So This Is Harris!	Louis Brock
1932–33 (6th)	Mister Mugg	Warren Doane
1932–33 (6th)	A Preferred List	Louis Brock
1932–33 (6th)	Novelty	
1932–33 (6th)	Krakatoa	Joe Rock
1932–33 (6th)	Menu	Pete Smith
1932–33 (6th)	The Sea	Educational
1934 (7th)
1934 (7th)	Comedy	
1934 (7th)	La Cucaracha	Kenneth Macgowan
1934 (7th)	Men in Black	Jules White
1934 (7th)	What, No Men!	Warner Bros.
1934 (7th)	Novelty	
1934 (7th)	City of Wax	Stacy Woodard and Horace Woodard
1934 (7th)	Bosom Friends	Skibo Productions
1934 (7th)	Strikes and Spares	Pete Smith
1935 (8th)
1935 (8th)	Comedy	
1935 (8th)	How to Sleep	Jack Chertok
1935 (8th)	Oh, My Nerves	Jules White
1935 (8th)	Tit for Tat	Hal Roach
1935 (8th)	Novelty	
1935 (8th)	Wings Over Everest	Gaumont British and Skibo Productions
1935 (8th)	Audioscopiks	Pete Smith
1935 (8th)	Camera Thrills	Universal
1936 (9th)
1936 (9th)	Color	
1936 (9th)	Give Me Liberty	Warner Bros.
1936 (9th)	La Fiesta de Santa Barbara	Louis Lewyn
1936 (9th)	Popular Science J-6-2	Paramount
1936 (9th)	One-Reel	
1936 (9th)	Bored of Education	Hal Roach
1936 (9th)	Moscow Moods	Paramount
1936 (9th)	Wanted, a Master	Pete Smith
1936 (9th)	Two-Reel	
1936 (9th)	The Public Pays	Metro-Goldwyn-Mayer
1936 (9th)	Double or Nothing	Warner Bros.
1936 (9th)	Dummy Ache	RKO Radio
1937 (10th)
1937 (10th)	Color	
1937 (10th)	Penny Wisdom	Pete Smith
1937 (10th)	The Man Without a Country	Warner Bros.
1937 (10th)	Popular Science J-7-1	Paramount
1937 (10th)	One-Reel	
1937 (10th)	The Private Life of the Gannets	Skibo Productions
1937 (10th)	A Night at the Movies	Metro-Goldwyn-Mayer
1937 (10th)	Romance of Radium	Pete Smith
1937 (10th)	Two-Reel	
1937 (10th)	Torture Money	Metro-Goldwyn-Mayer
1937 (10th)	Deep South	RKO Radio
1937 (10th)	Should Wives Work?	RKO Radio
1938 (11th)
1938 (11th)	One-Reel	
1938 (11th)	That Mothers Might Live	Metro-Goldwyn-Mayer
1938 (11th)	The Great Heart	Metro-Goldwyn-Mayer
1938 (11th)	Timber Toppers	20th Century-Fox
1938 (11th)	Two-Reel	
1938 (11th)	Declaration of Independence	Warner Bros.
1938 (11th)	Swingtime in the Movies	Warner Bros.
1938 (11th)	They're Always Caught	Metro-Goldwyn-Mayer
1939 (12th)
1939 (12th)	One-Reel	
1939 (12th)	Busy Little Bears	Paramount
1939 (12th)	Information Please	RKO Radio
1939 (12th)	Prophet Without Honor	Metro-Goldwyn-Mayer
1939 (12th)	Sword Fishing	Warner Bros.
1939 (12th)	Two-Reel	
1939 (12th)	Sons of Liberty	Warner Bros.
1939 (12th)	Drunk Driving	Metro-Goldwyn-Mayer
1939 (12th)	Five Times Five	RKO Radio

=== 1940s ===
Year	Film	Nominees
1940 (13th)	One-Reel	
1940 (13th)	Quicker'n a Wink	Pete Smith
1940 (13th)	London Can Take It!	Warner Bros.
1940 (13th)	More About Nostradamus	Metro-Goldwyn-Mayer
1940 (13th)	Siege	RKO Radio
1940 (13th)	Two-Reel	
1940 (13th)	Teddy, the Rough Rider	Warner Bros.
1940 (13th)	Eyes of the Navy	Metro-Goldwyn-Mayer
1940 (13th)	Service with the Colors	Warner Bros.
1941 (14th)
1941 (14th)	One-Reel	
1941 (14th)	Of Pups and Puzzles	Metro-Goldwyn-Mayer
1941 (14th)	Army Champions	Pete Smith
1941 (14th)	Beauty and the Beach	Paramount
1941 (14th)	Down on the Farm	Paramount
1941 (14th)	Forty Boys and a Song	Warner Bros.
1941 (14th)	Kings of the Turf	Warner Bros.
1941 (14th)	Sagebrush and Silver	20th Century-Fox
1941 (14th)	Two-Reel	
1941 (14th)	Main Street on the March!	Metro-Goldwyn-Mayer
1941 (14th)	Alive in the Deep	Woodward Productions, Inc.
1941 (14th)	Forbidden Passage	Metro-Goldwyn-Mayer
1941 (14th)	The Gay Parisian	Warner Bros.
1941 (14th)	The Tanks Are Coming	United States Army
1942 (15th)
1942 (15th)	One-Reel	
1942 (15th)	Speaking of Animals and Their Families	Paramount
1942 (15th)	Desert Wonderland	20th Century-Fox
1942 (15th)	Marines in the Making	Pete Smith
1942 (15th)	United States Marine Band	Warner Bros.
1942 (15th)	Two-Reel	
1942 (15th)	Beyond the Line of Duty	Warner Bros.
1942 (15th)	Don't Talk	Metro-Goldwyn-Mayer
1942 (15th)	Private Smith of the U.S.A.	RKO Radio
1943 (16th)
1943 (16th)	One-Reel	
1943 (16th)	Amphibious Fighters	Grantland Rice
1943 (16th)	Cavalcade of Dance with Veloz and Yolanda	Gordon Hollingshead
1943 (16th)	Champions Carry On	Edmund Reek
1943 (16th)	Hollywood in Uniform	Ralph Staub
1943 (16th)	Seeing Hands	Pete Smith
1943 (16th)	Two-Reel	
1943 (16th)	Heavenly Music	Jerry Bresler and Sam Coslow
1943 (16th)	Letter to a Hero	Frederic Ullman Jr.
1943 (16th)	Mardi Gras	Walter MacEwen
1943 (16th)	Women at War	Gordon Hollingshead
1944 (17th)
1944 (17th)	One-Reel	
1944 (17th)	Who's Who in Animal Land	Jerry Fairbanks
1944 (17th)	Blue Grass Gentlemen	Edmund Reek
1944 (17th)	Jammin' the Blues	Gordon Hollingshead
1944 (17th)	Movie Pests	Pete Smith
1944 (17th)	Screen Snapshots' 50th Anniversary of Motion Pictures	Ralph Staub
1944 (17th)	Two-Reel	
1944 (17th)	I Won't Play	Gordon Hollingshead
1944 (17th)	Bombalera	Louis Harris
1944 (17th)	Main Street Today	Jerry Bresler
1945 (18th)
1945 (18th)	One-Reel	
1945 (18th)	Stairway to Light	Herbert Moulton and Jerry Bresler
1945 (18th)	Along the Rainbow Trail	Edmund Reek
1945 (18th)	Screen Snapshots' 25th Anniversary	Ralph Staub
1945 (18th)	Story of a Dog	Gordon Hollingshead
1945 (18th)	White Rhapsody	Grantland Rice
1945 (18th)	Your National Gallery	Joseph O'Brien and Thomas Mead
1945 (18th)	Two-Reel	
1945 (18th)	Star in the Night	Gordon Hollingshead
1945 (18th)	A Gun in His Hand	Chester Franklin and Jerry Bresler
1945 (18th)	The Jury Goes Round 'N' Round	Jules White
1945 (18th)	The Little Witch	George Templeton
1946 (19th)
1946 (19th)	One-Reel	
1946 (19th)	Facing Your Danger	Gordon Hollingshead
1946 (19th)	Dive-Hi Champs	Jack Eaton
1946 (19th)	Golden Horses	Edmund Reek
1946 (19th)	Smart as a Fox	Gordon Hollingshead
1946 (19th)	Sure Cures	Pete Smith
1946 (19th)	Two-Reel	
1946 (19th)	A Boy and His Dog	Gordon Hollingshead
1946 (19th)	College Queen	George Templeton
1946 (19th)	Hiss and Yell	Jules White
1946 (19th)	The Luckiest Guy in the World	Jerry Bresler
1947 (20th)
1947 (20th)	One-Reel	
1947 (20th)	Goodbye, Miss Turlock	Herbert Moulton
1947 (20th)	Brooklyn, U.S.A.	Thomas Mead
1947 (20th)	Moon Rockets	Jerry Fairbanks
1947 (20th)	Now You See It	Pete Smith
1947 (20th)	So You Want to Be in Pictures	Gordon Hollingshead
1947 (20th)	Two-Reel	
1947 (20th)	Climbing the Matterhorn	Irving Allen
1947 (20th)	Champagne for Two	Harry Grey
1947 (20th)	Fight of the Wild Stallions	Thomas Mead
1947 (20th)	Give Us the Earth	Herbert Morgan
1947 (20th)	A Voice Is Born: The Story of Niklos Gafni	Ben Blake
1948 (21st)
1948 (21st)	One-Reel	
1948 (21st)	Symphony of a City	Edmund Reek
1948 (21st)	Annie Was a Wonder	Herbert Moulton
1948 (21st)	Cinderella Horse	Gordon Hollingshead
1948 (21st)	So You Want to Be on the Radio	Gordon Hollingshead
1948 (21st)	You Can't Win	Pete Smith
1948 (21st)	Two-Reel	
1948 (21st)	Seal Island	Walt Disney
1948 (21st)	Calgary Stampede	Gordon Hollingshead
1948 (21st)	Going to Blazes	Herbert Morgan
1948 (21st)	Samba-Mania	Harry Grey
1948 (21st)	Snow Capers	Thomas Mead
1949 (22nd)
1949 (22nd)	One-Reel	
1949 (22nd)	Aquatic House Party	Jack Eaton
1949 (22nd)	Roller Derby Girl	Justin Herman
1949 (22nd)	So You Think You're Not Guilty	Gordon Hollingshead
1949 (22nd)	Spills and Chills	Walton C. Ament
1949 (22nd)	Water Trix	Pete Smith
1949 (22nd)	Two-Reel	
1949 (22nd)	Van Gogh	Gaston Diehl and Robert Haessens
1949 (22nd)	The Boy and the Eagle	William Lasky
1949 (22nd)	Chase of Death	Irving Allen
1949 (22nd)	The Grass Is Always Greener	Gordon Hollingshead
1949 (22nd)	Snow Carnival	Gordon Hollingshead

=== 1950s ===
Year	Film	Nominees
1950 (23rd)	One-Reel	
1950 (23rd)	Grandad of Races	Gordon Hollingshead
1950 (23rd)	Blaze Busters	Robert Youngson
1950 (23rd)	Wrong Way Butch	Pete Smith
1950 (23rd)	Two-Reel	
1950 (23rd)	In Beaver Valley	Walt Disney
1950 (23rd)	Grandma Moses	Falcon Films, Inc.
1950 (23rd)	My Country 'Tis of Thee	Gordon Hollingshead
1951 (24th)
1951 (24th)	One-Reel	
1951 (24th)	World of Kids	Robert Youngson
1951 (24th)	Ridin' the Rails	Jack Eaton
1951 (24th)	The Story of Time	Roger G. Leffingwell
1951 (24th)	Two-Reel	
1951 (24th)	Nature's Half Acre	Walt Disney
1951 (24th)	Balzac	Les Films du Compass
1951 (24th)	Danger Under the Sea	Tom Mead
1952 (25th)
1952 (25th)	One-Reel	
1952 (25th)	Light in the Window	Boris Vermont
1952 (25th)	Athletes of the Saddle	Jack Eaton
1952 (25th)	Desert Killer	Gordon Hollingshead
1952 (25th)	Neighbours	Norman McLaren
1952 (25th)	Royal Scotland	Crown Film Unit
1952 (25th)	Two-Reel	
1952 (25th)	Water Birds	Walt Disney
1952 (25th)	Bridge of Time	London Film Productions
1952 (25th)	Devil Take Us	Herbert Morgan
1952 (25th)	Thar She Blows!	Gordon Hollingshead
1953 (26th)
1953 (26th)	One-Reel	
1953 (26th)	Overture to The Merry Wives of Windsor	Johnny Green
1953 (26th)	Christ Among the Primitives	Vincenzo Lucci-Chiarissi
1953 (26th)	Herring Hunt	National Film Board of Canada
1953 (26th)	Joy of Living	Boris Vermont
1953 (26th)	Wee Water Wonders	Jack Eaton
1953 (26th)	Two-Reel	
1953 (26th)	Bear Country	Walt Disney
1953 (26th)	Ben and Me	Walt Disney
1953 (26th)	Return to Glennascaul	Dublin Gate Theatre Productions
1953 (26th)	Vesuvius Express	Otto Lang
1953 (26th)	Winter Paradise	Cedric Francis
1954 (27th)
1954 (27th)	One-Reel	
1954 (27th)	This Mechanical Age	Robert Youngson
1954 (27th)	The First Piano Quartette	Otto Lang
1954 (27th)	The Strauss Fantasy	Johnny Green
1954 (27th)	Two-Reel	
1954 (27th)	A Time Out of War	Denis Sanders and Terry Sanders
1954 (27th)	Beauty and the Bull	Cedric Francis
1954 (27th)	Jet Carrier	Otto Lang
1954 (27th)	Siam	Walt Disney
1955 (28th)
1955 (28th)	One-Reel	
1955 (28th)	Survival City	Edmund Reek
1955 (28th)	3rd Ave. El	Carson Davidson
1955 (28th)	Gadgets Galore	Robert Youngson
1955 (28th)	Three Kisses	Justin Herman
1955 (28th)	Two-Reel	
1955 (28th)	The Face of Lincoln	Wilbur T. Blume
1955 (28th)	24-Hour Alert	Cedric Francis
1955 (28th)	The Battle of Gettysburg	Dore Schary
1955 (28th)	On the Twelfth Day	George K. Arthur
1955 (28th)	Switzerland	Walt Disney
1956 (29th)
1956 (29th)	One-Reel	
1956 (29th)	Crashing the Water Barrier	Konstantin Kalser
1956 (29th)	I Never Forget a Face	Robert Youngson
1956 (29th)	Time Stood Still	Cedric Francis
1956 (29th)	Two-Reel	
1956 (29th)	The Bespoke Overcoat	Romulus Films
1956 (29th)	Cow Dog	Larry Lansburgh
1956 (29th)	The Dark Wave	John Healy
1956 (29th)	Samoa	Walt Disney
1957 (30th)
1957 (30th)	The Wetback Hound	Larry Lansburgh
1957 (30th)	A Chairy Tale	Norman McLaren
1957 (30th)	City of Gold	Tom Daly
1957 (30th)	Foothold on Antarctica	James Carr
1957 (30th)	Portugal	Ben Sharpsteen
1958 (31st)
1958 (31st)	Grand Canyon	Walt Disney
1958 (31st)	Journey Into Spring	Ian Ferguson
1958 (31st)	The Kiss	John Patrick Hayes
1958 (31st)	Snows of Aorangi	New Zealand Screen Board
1958 (31st)	T Is for Tumbleweed	James A. Lebenthal
1959 (32nd)
1959 (32nd)	The Golden Fish	Jacques-Yves Cousteau
1959 (32nd)	Between the Tides	Ian Ferguson
1959 (32nd)	Mysteries of the Deep	Walt Disney
1959 (32nd)	The Running, Jumping and Standing-Still Film	Peter Sellers
1959 (32nd)	Skyscraper	Shirley Clarke, Willard Van Dyke and Irving Jacoby

=== 1960s ===
Year	Film	Nominees
1960 (33rd)	Day of the Painter	Ezra R. Baker
1960 (33rd)	The Creation of Woman	Charles F. Schwep and Ismail Merchant
1960 (33rd)	Islands of the Sea	Walt Disney
1960 (33rd)	A Sport Is Born	Leslie Winik
1961 (34th)
1961 (34th)	Seawards the Great Ships	Templar Film Studios, Hilary Harris
1961 (34th)	Ballon Vole (Play Ball!)	Ciné-Documents
1961 (34th)	The Face of Jesus	Dr. John D. Jennings
1961 (34th)	Rooftops of New York	Robert Gaffney
1961 (34th)	Very Nice, Very Nice	National Film Board of Canada
1962 (35th)
1962 (35th)	Heureux Anniversaire (Happy Anniversary)	Pierre Étaix and Jean-Claude Carrière
1962 (35th)	Big City Blues	Martina Huguenot van der Linden and Charles Huguenot van der Linden
1962 (35th)	The Cadillac	Robert Clouse
1962 (35th)	The Cliff Dwellers (Note: Academy records note that The Cliff Dwellers was previously titled One Plus One.)	Hayward Anderson
1962 (35th)	Pan	Herman van der Horst
1963 (36th)
1963 (36th)	An Occurrence at Owl Creek Bridge	Paul de Roubaix and Marcel Ichac
1963 (36th)	The Concert	Ezra Baker
1963 (36th)	Home-Made Car	James Hill
1963 (36th)	Six-Sided Triangle	Christopher Miles
1963 (36th)	That's Me	Walker Stuart
1964 (37th)
1964 (37th)	Casals Conducts: 1964	Edward Schreiber
1964 (37th)	Help! My Snowman's Burning Down	Carson Davidson
1964 (37th)	The Legend of Jimmy Blue Eyes	Robert Clouse
1965 (38th)
1965 (38th)	The Chicken (Le Poulet)	Claude Berri
1965 (38th)	Fortress of Peace	Lothar Wolff
1965 (38th)	Skaterdater	Marshal Backlar and Noel Black
1965 (38th)	Snow	Edgar Anstey
1965 (38th)	Time Piece	Jim Henson
1966 (39th)
1966 (39th)	Wild Wings	Edgar Anstey
1966 (39th)	Turkey the Bridge	Marin Karmitz and Vladimir Forgency
1966 (39th)	The Winning Strain	Leslie Winik
1967 (40th)
1967 (40th)	A Place to Stand	Christopher Chapman
1967 (40th)	Paddle to the Sea	Julian Biggs
1967 (40th)	Sky Over Holland	John Ferno
1967 (40th)	Stop, Look and Listen	Len Janson and Chuck Menville
1968 (41st)
1968 (41st)	Robert Kennedy Remembered	Charles Guggenheim
1968 (41st)	The Dove	George Coe, Sidney Davis and Anthony Lover
1968 (41st)	Duo	National Film Board of Canada
1968 (41st)	Prelude	John Astin
1969 (42nd)
1969 (42nd)	The Magic Machines	Joan Keller Stern
1969 (42nd)	Blake	Bill Mason
1969 (42nd)	People Soup	Marc Merson

=== 1970s ===
Year	Film	Nominees
1970 (43rd)	The Resurrection of Broncho Billy	John Longenecker
1970 (43rd)	Shut Up... I'm Crying	Robert Siegler
1970 (43rd)	Sticky My Fingers... Fleet My Feet	John Hancock
1971 (44th)
1971 (44th)	Sentinels of Silence	Manuel Arango and Robert Amram
1971 (44th)	Good Morning	Denny Evans and Ken Greenwald
1971 (44th)	The Rehearsal	Stephen F. Verona
1972 (45th)
1972 (45th)	Norman Rockwell's World... An American Dream	Richard Barclay
1972 (45th)	Frog Story	Ron Satlof and Ray Gideon
1972 (45th)	Solo	David Adams
1973 (46th)
1973 (46th)	The Bolero	Allan Miller and William Fertik
1973 (46th)	Clockmaker	Richard Gayer
1973 (46th)	Life Times Nine	Pen Densham and John Watson
1974 (47th)
1974 (47th)	One-Eyed Men Are Kings	Paul Claudon and Edmond Séchan
1974 (47th)	Climb	Dewitt Jones
1974 (47th)	The Concert	Julian Chagrin and Claude Chagrin
1974 (47th)	Planet Ocean	George V. Casey
1974 (47th)	The Violin	Andrew Welsh and George Pastic
1975 (48th)
1975 (48th)	Angel and Big Joe	Bert Salzman
1975 (48th)	Conquest of Light	Louis Marcus
1975 (48th)	Dawn Flight	Lawrence M. Lansburgh and Brian Lansburgh
1975 (48th)	A Day in the Life of Bonnie Consolo	Barry Spinello
1975 (48th)	Doubletalk	Alan Beattie
1976 (49th)
1976 (49th)	In the Region of Ice	Andre R. Guttfreund and Peter Werner
1976 (49th)	Kudzu	Marjorie Anne Short
1976 (49th)	The Morning Spider	Julian Chagrin and Claude Chagrin
1976 (49th)	Nightlife	Claire Wilbur and Robin Lehman
1976 (49th)	Number One	Dyan Cannon and Vince Cannon
1977 (50th)
1977 (50th)	I'll Find a Way	Beverly Shaffer and Yuki Yoshida
1977 (50th)	The Absent-Minded Waiter	William E. McEuen
1977 (50th)	Floating Free	Jerry Butts
1977 (50th)	Notes on the Popular Arts	Saul Bass
1977 (50th)	Spaceborne	Philip Dauber
1978 (51st)
1978 (51st)	Teenage Father	Taylor Hackford
1978 (51st)	A Different Approach	Jim Belcher and Fern Field
1978 (51st)	Mandy's Grandmother	Andrew Sugerman
1978 (51st)	Strange Fruit	Seth Pinsker
1979 (52nd)
1979 (52nd)	Board and Care	Sarah Pillsbury and Ron Ellis
1979 (52nd)	Bravery in the Field	Roman Kroitor and Stefan Wodoslawsky
1979 (52nd)	Oh Brother, My Brother	Carol Lowell and Ross Lowell
1979 (52nd)	The Solar Film	Saul Bass and Michael Britton
1979 (52nd)	Solly's Diner	Harry Mathias, Jay Zukerman and Larry Hankin

=== 1980s ===
Year	Film	Nominees
1980 (53rd)	The Dollar Bottom	Lloyd Phillips
1980 (53rd)	Fall Line	Bob Carmichael and Greg Lowe
1980 (53rd)	A Jury of Her Peers	Sally Heckel
1981 (54th)
1981 (54th)	Violet	Paul Kemp and Shelley Levinson
1981 (54th)	Couples and Robbers	Christine Oestreicher
1981 (54th)	First Winter	John N. Smith
1982 (55th)
1982 (55th)	A Shocking Accident	Christine Oestreicher
1982 (55th)	Ballet Robotique	Bob Rogers
1982 (55th)	The Silence	Michael Toshiyuki Uno and Joseph Benson
1982 (55th)	Split Cherry Tree	Jan Saunders
1982 (55th)	Sredni Vashtar	Andrew Birkin
1983 (56th)
1983 (56th)	Boys and Girls	Janice L. Platt
1983 (56th)	Goodie-Two-Shoes	Ian Emes
1983 (56th)	Overnight Sensation	Jon N. Bloom
1984 (57th)
1984 (57th)	Up	Mike Hoover
1984 (57th)	The Painted Door	Michael MacMillan and Janice L. Platt
1984 (57th)	Tales of Meeting and Parting	Sharon Oreck and Lesli Linka Glatter
1985 (58th)
1985 (58th)	Molly's Pilgrim	Jeffrey D. Brown and Chris Pelzer
1985 (58th)	Graffiti	Dianna Costello
1985 (58th)	Rainbow War	Bob Rogers
1986 (59th)
1986 (59th)	Precious Images	Chuck Workman
1986 (59th)	Exit	Stefano Reali and Pino Quartullo
1986 (59th)	Love Struck	Fredda Weiss
1987 (60th)
1987 (60th)	Ray's Male Heterosexual Dance Hall	Jonathan Sanger and Jana Sue Memel
1987 (60th)	Making Waves	Ann Wingate
1987 (60th)	Shoeshine	Robert A. Katz
1988 (61st)
1988 (61st)	The Appointments of Dennis Jennings	Dean Parisot and Steven Wright
1988 (61st)	Cadillac Dreams	Matia Karrell and Abbee Goldstein
1988 (61st)	Gullah Tales	George deGolian and Gary Moss
1989 (62nd)
1989 (62nd)	Work Experience	James Hendrie
1989 (62nd)	Amazon Diary	Robert Nixon
1989 (62nd)	The Childeater	Jonathan Tammuz

=== 1990s ===
Year	Film	Nominees
1990 (63rd)	The Lunch Date	Adam Davidson
1990 (63rd)	12:01 PM	Hillary Ripps and Jonathan Heap
1990 (63rd)	Bronx Cheers	Raymond De Felitta and Matthew Gross
1990 (63rd)	Dear Rosie	Peter Cattaneo and Barnaby Thompson
1990 (63rd)	Senzeni Na? (What Have We Done?)	Bernard Joffa and Anthony E. Nicholas
1991 (64th)
1991 (64th)	Session Man	Seth Winston and Robert N. Fried
1991 (64th)	Birch Street Gym	Stephen Kessler and Thomas R. Conroy
1991 (64th)	Last Breeze of Summer	David M. Massey
1992 (65th)
1992 (65th)	Omnibus	Sam Karmann
1992 (65th)	Contact	Jonathan Darby and Jana Sue Memel
1992 (65th)	Cruise Control	Matt Palmieri
1992 (65th)	The Lady in Waiting	Christian M. Taylor
1992 (65th)	Swan Song	Kenneth Branagh
1993 (66th)
1993 (66th)	Black Rider (Schwarzfahrer)	Pepe Danquart
1993 (66th)	Down on the Waterfront	Stacy Title and Jonathan Penner
1993 (66th)	The Dutch Master	Susan Seidelman and Jonathan Brett
1993 (66th)	Partners	Peter Weller and Jana Sue Memel
1993 (66th)	The Screw (La Vis)	Didier Flamand
1994 (67th) (Note: A tie in voting resulted in two winners.)
1994 (67th)	Franz Kafka's It's a Wonderful Life (TIE)	Peter Capaldi and Ruth Kenley-Letts
1994 (67th)	Trevor (TIE)	Peggy Rajski and Randy Stone
1994 (67th)	Kangaroo Court	Sean Astin and Christine Astin
1994 (67th)	On Hope	JoBeth Williams and Michele McGuire
1994 (67th)	Syrup	Paul Unwin and Nick Vivian
1995 (68th)
1995 (68th)	Lieberman in Love	Christine Lahti and Jana Sue Memel
1995 (68th)	Brooms	Luke Cresswell and Steve McNicholas
1995 (68th)	Duke of Groove	Griffin Dunne and Thom Colwell
1995 (68th)	Little Surprises	Jeff Goldblum and Tikki Goldberg
1995 (68th)	Tuesday Morning Ride	Dianne Houston and Joy Ryan
1996 (69th)
1996 (69th)	Dear Diary	David Frankel and Barry Jossen
1996 (69th)	De Tripas, Corazon	Antonio Urrutia
1996 (69th)	Ernst & Lyset	Kim Magnusson and Anders Thomas Jensen
1996 (69th)	Esposados	Juan Carlos Fresnadillo
1996 (69th)	Wordless	Bernadette Carranza and Antonello De Leo
1997 (70th)
1997 (70th)	Visas and Virtue	Chris Tashima and Chris Donahue
1997 (70th)	Dance Lexie Dance	Pearse Moore and Tim Loane
1997 (70th)	It's Good to Talk	Roger Goldby and Barney Reisz
1997 (70th)	Sweethearts?	Birger Larsen and Thomas Lydholm
1997 (70th)	Wolfgang	Kim Magnusson and Anders Thomas Jensen
1998 (71st)
1998 (71st)	Election Night (Valgaften)	Kim Magnusson and Anders Thomas Jensen
1998 (71st)	Culture	Will Speck and Josh Gordon
1998 (71st)	Holiday Romance	Alexander Jovy and JJ Keith
1998 (71st)	La Carte Postale (The Postcard)	Vivian Goffette
1998 (71st)	Victor	Simon Sandquist and Joel Bergvall
1999 (72nd)
1999 (72nd)	My Mother Dreams the Satan's Disciples in New York	Barbara Schock and Tamara Tiehel
1999 (72nd)	Bror, Min Bror (Teis and Nico)	Henrik Ruben Genz and Michael W. Horsten
1999 (72nd)	Killing Joe	Mehdi Norowzian and Steve Wax
1999 (72nd)	Kleingeld (Small Change)	Marc-Andreas Bochert and Gabriele Lins
1999 (72nd)	Major and Minor Miracles	Marcus A. Olsson

=== 2000s ===
Year	Film	Nominees
2000 (73rd)	Quiero Ser (I want to be...)	Florian Gallenberger
2000 (73rd)	By Courier	Peter Riegert and Ericka Frederick
2000 (73rd)	One Day Crossing	Joan Stein and Christina Lazaridi
2000 (73rd)	Seraglio	Gail Lerner and Colin Campbell
2000 (73rd)	A Soccer Story (Uma Historia de Futebol)	Paulo Machline
2001 (74th)
2001 (74th)	The Accountant	Ray McKinnon and Lisa Blount
2001 (74th)	Copy Shop	Virgil Widrich
2001 (74th)	Gregor's Greatest Invention	Johannes Kiefer
2001 (74th)	Meska Sprawa (A Man Thing)	Sławomir Fabicki and Bogumil Godfrejow
2001 (74th)	Speed for Thespians	Kalman Apple and Shameela Bakhsh
2002 (75th)
2002 (75th)	This Charming Man (Der Er En Yndig Mand)	Martin Strange-Hansen and Mie Andreasen
2002 (75th)	Fait d'hiver (Gridlock)	Dirk Beliën and Anja Daelemans
2002 (75th)	J'attendrai le suivant... (I'll Wait for the Next One...)	Philippe Orreindy and Thomas Gaudin
2002 (75th)	Inja (Dog)	Steven Pasvolsky and Joe Weatherstone
2002 (75th)	Johnny Flynton	Lexi Alexander and Alexander Buono
2003 (76th)
2003 (76th)	Two Soldiers	Aaron Schneider and Andrew J. Sacks
2003 (76th)	Die Rote Jacke (The Red Jacket)	Florian Baxmeyer
2003 (76th)	Most (The Bridge)	Bobby Garabedian and William Zabka
2003 (76th)	Squash	Lionel Bailliu
2003 (76th)	(A) Torzija [(A) Torsion]	Stefan Arsenijević
2004 (77th)
2004 (77th)	Wasp	Andrea Arnold
2004 (77th)	7:35 de la Mañana (7:35 in the Morning)	Nacho Vigalondo
2004 (77th)	Everything in This Country Must	Gary McKendry
2004 (77th)	Little Terrorist	Ashvin Kumar
2004 (77th)	Two Cars, One Night	Taika Waititi and Ainsley Gardiner
2005 (78th)
2005 (78th)	Six Shooter	Martin McDonagh
2005 (78th)	Ausreisser (The Runaway)	Ulrike Grote
2005 (78th)	Cashback	Sean Ellis and Lene Bausager
2005 (78th)	The Last Farm	Rúnar Rúnarsson and Thor S. Sigurjónsson
2005 (78th)	Our Time Is Up	Rob Pearlstein and Pia Clemente
2006 (79th)
2006 (79th)	West Bank Story	Ari Sandel
2006 (79th)	Binta and the Great Idea (Binta y la Gran Idea)	Javier Fesser and Luis Manso
2006 (79th)	Éramos Pocos (One Too Many)	Borja Cobeaga
2006 (79th)	Helmer & Son	Søren Pilmark and Kim Magnusson
2006 (79th)	The Saviour	Peter Templeman and Stuart Parkyn
2007 (80th)
2007 (80th)	Le Mozart des pickpockets	Philippe Pollet-Villard
2007 (80th)	At Night	Christian E. Christiansen and Louise Vesth
2007 (80th)	Il Supplente (The Substitute)	Andrea Jublin
2007 (80th)	Tanghi Argentini	Guido Thys and Anja Daelemans
2007 (80th)	The Tonto Woman	Daniel Barber and Matthew Brown
2008 (81st)
2008 (81st)	Toyland	Jochen Alexander Freydank
2008 (81st)	Auf der Strecke (On the Line)	Reto Caffi
2008 (81st)	Manon on the Asphalt	Elizabeth Marre and Olivier Pont
2008 (81st)	New Boy	Steph Green and Tamara Anghie
2008 (81st)	The Pig	Tivi Magnusson and Dorte Høgh
2009 (82nd)
2009 (82nd)	The New Tenants	Joachim Back and Tivi Magnusson
2009 (82nd)	The Door	Juanita Wilson and James Flynn
2009 (82nd)	Instead of Abracadabra	Patrik Eklund and Mathias Fjellström
2009 (82nd)	Kavi	Gregg Helvey
2009 (82nd)	Miracle Fish	Luke Doolan and Drew Bailey

=== 2010s ===
Year	Film	Nominees
2010 (83rd)	God of Love	Luke Matheny
2010 (83rd)	The Confession	Tanel Toom
2010 (83rd)	The Crush	Michael Creagh
2010 (83rd)	Na Wewe	Ivan Goldschmidt
2010 (83rd)	Wish 143	Ian Barnes and Samantha Waite
2011 (84th)
2011 (84th)	The Shore	Terry George and Oorlagh George
2011 (84th)	Pentecost	Peter McDonald and Eimear O'Kane
2011 (84th)	Raju	Max Zähle and Stefan Gieren
2011 (84th)	Time Freak	Andrew Bowler and Gigi Causey
2011 (84th)	~~Tuba Atlantic~~ (Note: Hallvar Witzø was announced as a nominee for Tuba Atlantic, but the nomination was rescinded by the Academy's Board of Governors in July 2012. The film was ineligible because it aired on Norwegian television in 2010.)	~~Hallvar Witzø~~
2012 (85th)
2012 (85th)	Curfew	Shawn Christensen
2012 (85th)	Asad	Bryan Buckley and Mino Jarjoura
2012 (85th)	Buzkashi Boys	Sam French and Ariel Nasr
2012 (85th)	Death of a Shadow (Dood van een Schaduw)	Tom Van Avermaet and Ellen De Waele
2012 (85th)	Henry	Yan England
2013 (86th)
2013 (86th)	Helium	Anders Walter and Kim Magnusson
2013 (86th)	Aquel No Era Yo (That Wasn't Me)	Esteban Crespo
2013 (86th)	Avant Que De Tout Perde (Just Before Losing Everything)	Xavier Legrand and Alexandre Gavras
2013 (86th)	Pitääkö Mun Kaikki Hoitaa? (Do I Have to Take Care of Everything?)	Selma Vilhunen and Kirsikka Saari
2013 (86th)	The Voorman Problem	Mark Gill and Baldwin Li
2014 (87th)
2014 (87th)	The Phone Call	Mat Kirkby and James Lucas
2014 (87th)	Aya	Oded Binnun and Mihal Brezis
2014 (87th)	Boogaloo and Graham	Michael Lennox and Ronan Blaney
2014 (87th)	Butter Lamp (La Lampe Au Beurre De Yak)	Hu Wei and Julien Féret
2014 (87th)	Parvaneh	Talkhon Hamzavi and Stefan Eichenberger
2015 (88th)
2015 (88th)	Stutterer	Benjamin Cleary and Serena Armitage
2015 (88th)	Ave Maria	Basil Khalil and Eric Dupont
2015 (88th)	Day One	Henry Hughes
2015 (88th)	Everything Will Be Okay (Alles Wird Gut)	Patrick Vollrath
2015 (88th)	Shok	Jamie Donoughue
2016 (89th)
2016 (89th)	Sing	Kristóf Deák and Anna Udvardy
2016 (89th)	Ennemis Intérieurs	Sélim Azzazi
2016 (89th)	La femme et le TGV	Timo von Gunten and Giacun Caduff
2016 (89th)	Silent Nights	Aske Bang and Kim Magnusson
2016 (89th)	Timecode	Juanjo Giménez
2017 (90th)
2017 (90th)	The Silent Child	Chris Overton and Rachel Shenton
2017 (90th)	DeKalb Elementary	Reed Van Dyk
2017 (90th)	The Eleven O'Clock	Derin Seale and Josh Lawson
2017 (90th)	My Nephew Emmett	Kevin Wilson Jr.
2017 (90th)	Watu Wote: All of Us	Katja Benrath and Tobias Rosen
2018 (91st)
2018 (91st)	Skin	Guy Nattiv and Jaime Ray Newman
2018 (91st)	Detainment	Vincent Lambe and Darren Mahon
2018 (91st)	Fauve	Jérémy Comte and Maria Gracia Turgeon
2018 (91st)	Marguerite	Marianne Farley and Marie-Hélène Panisset
2018 (91st)	Mother	Rodrigo Sorogoyen and María del Puy Alvarado
2019 (92nd)
2019 (92nd)	The Neighbors' Window	Marshall Curry
2019 (92nd)	Brotherhood	Meryam Joobeur and Maria Gracia Turgeon
2019 (92nd)	Nefta Football Club	Yves Piat and Damien Megherbi
2019 (92nd)	Saria	Bryan Buckley and Matt Lefebvre
2019 (92nd)	A Sister	Delphine Girard

=== 2020s ===
Year	Film	Nominees
2020/21 (93rd)	Two Distant Strangers	Travon Free and Martin Desmond Roe
2020/21 (93rd)	Feeling Through	Doug Roland and Susan Ruzenski
2020/21 (93rd)	The Letter Room	Elvira Lind and Sofia Sondervan
2020/21 (93rd)	The Present	Farah Nabulsi
2020/21 (93rd)	White Eye	Tomer Shushan and Shira Hochman
2021 (94th)
2021 (94th)	The Long Goodbye	Aneil Karia and Riz Ahmed
2021 (94th)	Ala Kachuu – Take and Run	Maria Brendle and Nadine Lüchinger
2021 (94th)	The Dress	Tadeusz Łysiak and Maciej Ślesicki
2021 (94th)	On My Mind	Martin Strange-Hansen and Kim Magnusson
2021 (94th)	Please Hold	K.D. Dávila and Levin Menekse
2022 (95th)
2022 (95th)	An Irish Goodbye	Tom Berkeley and Ross White
2022 (95th)	Ivalu	Anders Walter and Rebecca Pruzan
2022 (95th)	Le pupille	Alice Rohrwacher and Alfonso Cuarón
2022 (95th)	Night Ride	Eirik Tveiten and Gaute Lid Larssen
2022 (95th)	The Red Suitcase	Cyrus Neshvad
2023 (96th)
2023 (96th)	The Wonderful Story of Henry Sugar	Wes Anderson and Steven Rales
2023 (96th)	The After	Misan Harriman and Nicky Bentham
2023 (96th)	Invincible	Vincent René-Lortie and Samuel Caron
2023 (96th)	Knight of Fortune	Lasse Lyskjær Noer and Christian Norlyk
2023 (96th)	Red, White and Blue	Nazrin Choudhury and Sara McFarlane
2024 (97th)
2024 (97th)	I'm Not a Robot	Victoria Warmerdam and Trent
2024 (97th)	A Lien	Sam Cutler-Kreutz and David Cutler-Kreutz
2024 (97th)	Anuja	Adam J. Graves and Suchitra Mattai
2024 (97th)	The Last Ranger	Cindy Lee and Darwin Shaw
2024 (97th)	The Man Who Could Not Remain Silent	Nebojša Slijepčević and Danijel Pek
2025 (98th)
2025 (98th)	The Singers (TIE)	Sam A. Davis and Jack Piatt
2025 (98th)	Two People Exchanging Saliva (TIE)	Alexandre Singh and Natalie Musteata
2025 (98th)	Butcher's Stain	Meyer Levinson-Blount and Oron Caspi
2025 (98th)	A Friend of Dorothy	Lee Knight and James Dean
2025 (98th)	Jane Austen's Period Drama	Julia Aks and Steve Pinder

== See also ==
- Short film
- BAFTA Award for Best Short Film
- Academy Award for Best Animated Short Film
- List of Academy Award–nominated films

== Superlatives ==
For this Academy Award category, the following superlatives emerge:

- Most awards: Walt Disney – 6 awards (resulting from 13 nominations)
- Most nominations: Gordon Hollingshead – 20 nominations (resulting in 5 awards)
