= Army Champions =

1941 film

- Directed by: Paul C. Vogel
- Written by: Julian Harmon
- Produced by: Pete Smith
- Cinematography: Paul Vogel
- Distributed by: Metro-Goldwyn-Mayer
- Release date: October 11, 1941
- Running time: 11 minutes
- Country: United States
- Language: English

Army Champions is a 1941 American short documentary film directed by Paul C. Vogel. It was nominated for an Academy Award at the 14th Academy Awards for Best Short Subject (One-Reel).

== Cast ==
- Pete Smith as Narrator
