= A Wife's Life =

- Directed by: Dave O'Brien
- Written by: Dave O'Brien, Julian Harmon
- Produced by: Pete Smith
- Starring: Pete Smith; Dave O'Brien; Dorothy Short
- Narrated by: Pete Smith
- Cinematography: Harold Lipstein
- Edited by: Harry Komer
- Music by: David Snell (uncredited)
- Production company: Metro-Goldwyn-Mayer
- Distributed by: Metro-Goldwyn-Mayer
- Release date: September 1950
- Running time: 8 minutes
- Country: United States
- Language: English

A Wife's Life is an eight-minute film made in 1950 by filmmaker Pete Smith, who also narrates. It was directed by Dave O'Brien and written by Dave O'Brien and Julian Harmon. The film is narrated in Smith's classic nasal, matter-of-fact comedic style and is presented as a mockumentary of sorts.

== Plot ==
Mrs. George T. Hardnose is an average mid-century housewife burdened by her aloof and patriarchal husband. She calls her husband to say she wants to go to a movie that night; he says, nothing doing, he's tired, he's worked hard, and what has she done all day. In a series of flashbacks, we see her start by getting George out of bed and off to work, then bathing an obstreperous three-year-old, dealing with stopped drains and a faulty defroster, doing dishes, cajoling a rich uncle, washing clothes, mopping floors, sweeping behind heavy furniture, cleaning the stove and a rug, and cooking dinner. After dinner, when George asks her to let him have the paper, she cracks him over the head with a metal pipe wrapped in the paper.
