= The Tree in a Test Tube =

- The full film
- Directed by: Charles McDonald
- Produced by: United States Department of Agriculture
- Starring: Stan Laurel; Oliver Hardy
- Narrated by: Pete Smith; Lee Vickers
- Cinematography: Harold Sintzenich
- Edited by: Boris Vermont
- Music by: Edward Craig
- Distributed by: U.S. Forest Service
- Release date: 1942
- Running time: 10:30 min
- Country: United States
- Language: English

The Tree in a Test Tube is a 1942 short film produced by the U. S. Department of Agriculture and distributed by the U.S. Forest Service, featuring Laurel and Hardy, with narration read by MGM short-subject producer Pete Smith.

== Plot ==
Offscreen narrator Pete Smith hails Stan Laurel and Oliver Hardy, seemingly picked at random in the street. Smith asks if they have any items made of wood on their persons. There is no live sound recording, so Stan and Ollie's responses are in pantomime. Smith demonstrates the onmipresence of wood and wood by-products on the American scene, punctuating his remarks with wisecracking commentary. Smith wants to see their wallets and the contents of their suitcase. Among the items shown are paper, cellulose-based artificial leather, rayon, witch hazel, and bioplastics in consumer items (this was in the early days of mass-produced plastic, before petrochemical plastics became widespread). At one point Ollie even indicates that Stan's head is made of wood, to Stan's annoyance. After they show each item to the camera, they place their belongings in the suitcase, resting on the rear bumper of a parked car. As they wave goodbye to the narrator, the car speeds off with their property, and Stan and Ollie chase it into the distance.

The second half of the film is documentary film footage. Narrator Lee Vickers shifts the focus toward wood's importance to the World War II victory effort. Included in the documentary footage are visits to a research laboratory in Madison, Wisconsin, training sessions with U. S. troops, and a demonstration at the Ringling Bros. and Barnum & Bailey Circus in which an elephant stands on a piece of laminated veneer lumber without breaking it. There is a literally flag-waving conclusion, with footage of a patriotic parade.

== Production background ==
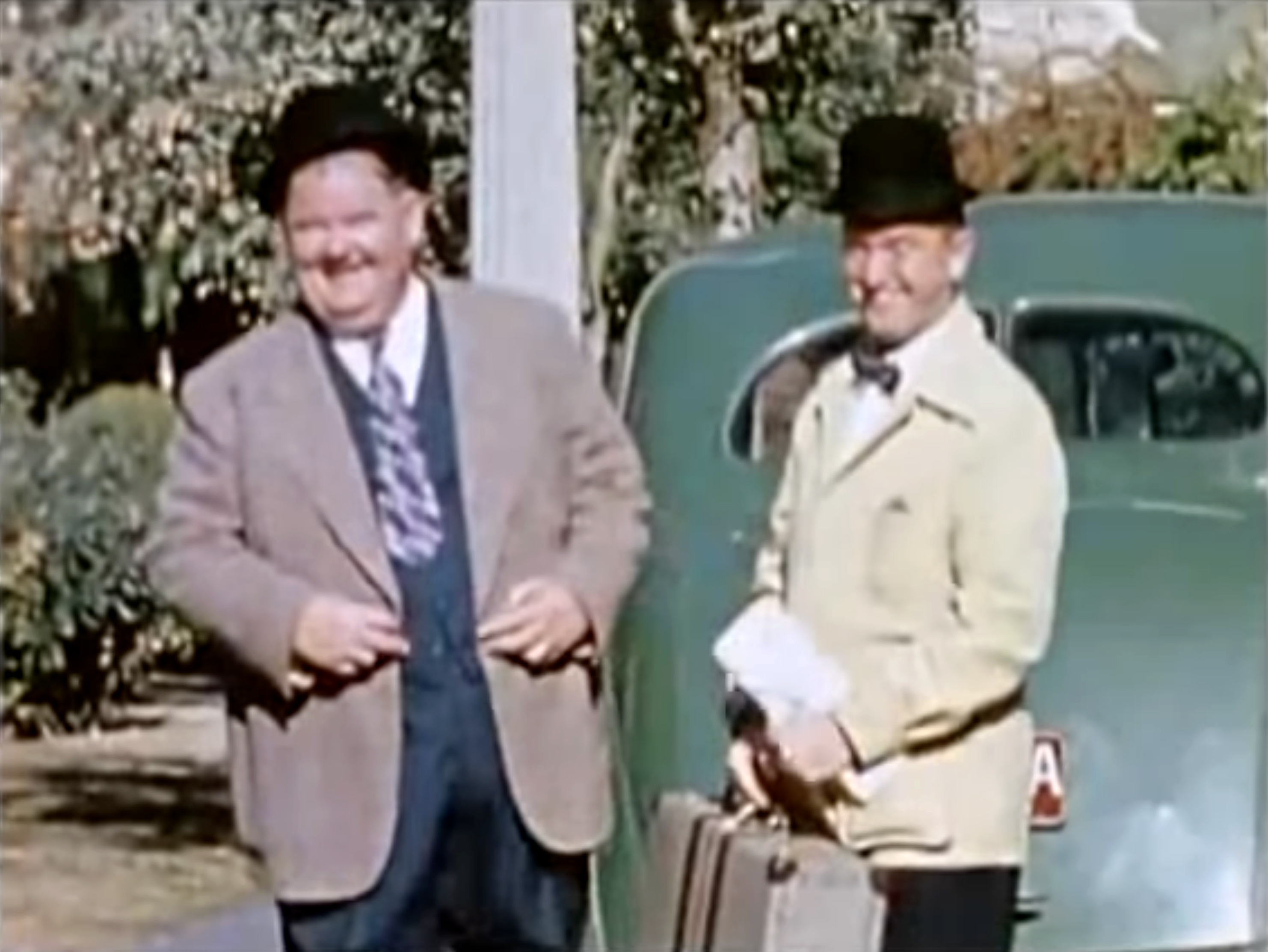
Oliver Hardy and Stan Laurel in The Tree in a Test Tube

The Tree in a Test Tube is Laurel and Hardy's only known surviving film professionally photographed in color. This 16mm Kodachrome subject was never intended to be shown in theaters; the 16mm format restricted it to nontheatrical screenings at libraries, schools, town meetings, and civic organizations.

The Laurel and Hardy scene was shot on the backlot of Twentieth Century-Fox on Saturday, November 29, 1941, which was between their films Great Guns and A-Haunting We Will Go. The Tree in a Test Tube went into nontheatrical release in the spring of 1942.

There are two versions of The Tree in a Test Tube in circulation. The lesser-known version is the complete 10-minute subject, with Laurel & Hardy in the first half, and the documentary footage in the second half. Far more common is the shorter home-movie version, which runs only five minutes and consists mostly of the Laurel and Hardy segment, as well as a brief clip of the documentary. The rest of the film is omitted, but the original end title is intact.

== Laurel and Hardy in color ==
Only original Kodak prints of The Tree in a Test Tube preserve the color values with true fidelity. Later reprints were made on less stable film stocks, subject to the colors fading, and what often survives today are copies of copies, resulting in images and colors that are less distinct. Some recent DVD releases offer The Tree in a Test Tube from older original prints, giving the viewer a more accurate impression of the vivid, vintage-1942 color.

Apart from The Tree in a Test Tube, very little film exists of Laurel and Hardy in color. The Rogue Song (1930), a feature-length musical made in Technicolor, is now considered a lost film, although several fragments have survived. Some home movies also exist in color: a Hollywood Victory Caravan performance of May 2, 1942, with Laurel and Hardy in costume; and casual footage of the team filmed in the mid-1950s.
