= Andy Varipapa =

Italian-American Tenpin Bowler (1891–1984)

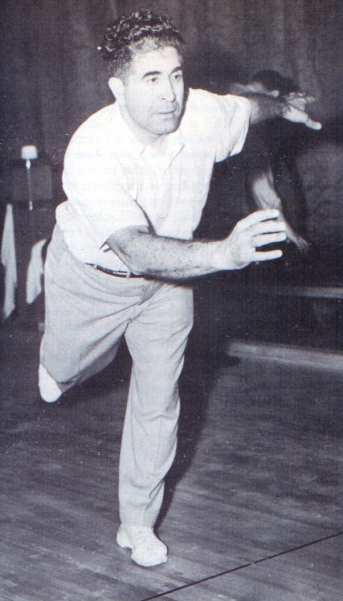
Andy Varipapa in 1934

Andy Varipapa (March 31, 1891 – August 25, 1984) was a professional bowler. He was famous around the world for his trick bowling shots and was the first to ever win back-to-back BPAA All-Star tournaments.

== Early life ==
Varipapa was born Andrea Varipapa in Carfizzi, a small Arbëreshë comune in the Calabria region of Italy, the son of Francesco and Concetta Varipapa. After his father's death, he and his family moved to the United States in 1903, where they settled in Brooklyn.

As a teenager, he worked as a pin boy, delivery boy, switchman, and in a soap factory. He first bowled at the Fraternity Hall alleys in Williamsburg in 1904 and practiced by emulating the game of a local up-and-comer, James Melillo. Varipapa made a good choice. After Melillo changed his name to Jimmy Smith, by 1906, he was World's Champion.

Varipapa became a well-known bowler in Brooklyn, but was disillusioned by the seedier aspects of the sport. He wanted to earn money from his talent, not from gambling. Without big-money tournaments, head-to-head matches were the only way for bowlers to make a living. He quit bowling for a time and turned his attention to baseball, and later boxing. He competed under the pseudonym "Andy Bell," believing it was a more suitable name for an athlete. Varipapa was hit by a truck whilst riding a bicycle during one of New York's many transit strikes in 1919, preventing him from pursuing baseball and boxing any further.

While working as a switchman on the Brooklyn Bridge, Varipapa took night courses at Pratt Institute and became a machinist. After working briefly at Remington UMC in Hoboken, he landed a job at the Brooklyn Navy Yard just as the U.S. entered World War I in 1917. After being laid off in 1921, he worked for a time selling insurance, but later leased a billiards room at the Empire Bowling and Billiards Academy in Bushwick. At Empire, Varipapa began to practice and hone his game. In 1926, brothers Ed and Jim Lawler hired Varipapa to manage their new bowling business in Stuyvesant Heights, and over the next several years, became one of the top bowlers in New York City. He bowled the first of his 78 300 games on March 28, 1927, and during the next two seasons captured the Brooklyn Alley Owners Individual, Long Island Individual, and Brooklyn Alley Owners Doubles titles.

== Professional bowling ==
In late 1930, Joe Falcaro invited Varipapa to compete in a doubles match against Jim Murgie and Charley Reilly, two of Philadelphia's top bowlers. Varipapa was the star of the match, averaging 233 over 42 games and leading him and Falcaro to a dominating 1,626 pin victory. Varipapa later said his performance gave him the confidence to focus all of his attention on becoming a professional bowler.

With few avenues to earn a living as a professional, Varipapa turned to learning the trick shots that would catapult him to national prominence. Practicing during off-hours at Lawler's, he started to perform his trick shots in 1932. In 1934, short film producer Pete Smith invited him to appear in his new short film, Strikes and Spares. His performance, along with later appearances in Set 'Em Up (1939) and Bowling Tricks (1948), made Varipapa the world's most famous bowler during the 1940s and 1950s. He toured from September to May, often six days per week. By 1937 he earned $100 per appearance, a handsome wage during the Great Depression.

Varipapa was considered to be "the greatest one-man bowling show on Earth" because of his jaw-dropping displays of trick shot artistry. He was famous for his ability to convert splits including the "impossible" 7-10 split rolling one ball from each hand down the lane. Modern stars including Chris Barnes and Norm Duke regularly use shots created by Andy in their trick shot routines.

Beyond his trick shot exhibitions, Varipapa was a solid professional bowler. In 1946, at age 55, he won the prestigious BPAA All-Star competition (predecessor to the U.S. Open) in a grueling 100-game format, making him the oldest winner. He became the first to win two years in a row when he repeated in 1947 despite a dramatic comeback by 1945 champion Joe Wilman of Chicago. In 1948, Varipapa came close to a three-peat, finishing second to winner Connie Schwoegler of Madison, Wisconsin.

On April 17, 1959, Varipapa won an $8,000 jackpot by throwing six consecutive strikes on the popular television show Phillies Jackpot Bowling. He retired from competition in March 1962 a week shy of his 71st birthday.

== Later years ==
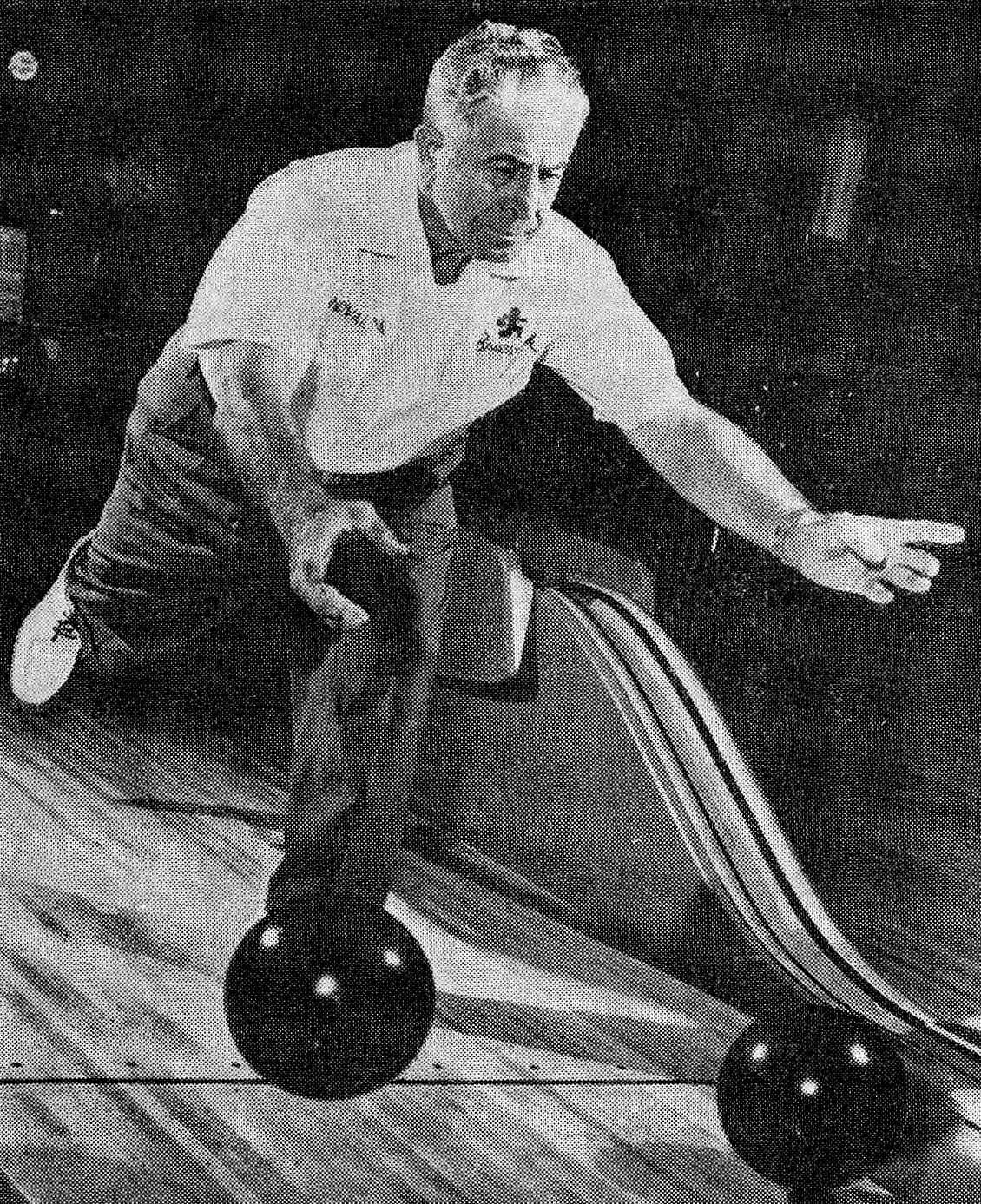
Varipapa, circa 1961

While retired from competition, Varipapa performed more than 100 days per year during the 1960s before cutting back to 20-30 per year in the mid-1970s. Suffering from arthritis, he began to bowl left-handed in 1969 and within a couple months was averaging in the 180s. President Nixon named him to the President's Advisory Conference for Physical Fitness and Sports in 1970, making him the oldest athlete and the only bowler so honored. He performed his trick shots on the popular ABC television show That's Incredible in 1980, exposing Varipapa to many who had never seen him perform.

Varipapa was inducted into the American Bowling Congress (now United States Bowling Congress) Hall of Fame in 1957. He is also a member of the New York City Bowling Association (1951), Eastern Long Island Bowling Association (1965), National Italian-American Sports (1980), New York State Bowling Association (1982), Long Island Sports (1984), and Bowling Coaches (2008) Halls of Fame.

== Personal life ==
Varipapa married Vincenzia (Alice) DeMartino on June 17, 1917. They had three children: Connie (Cornacchia), Frank, and Lorraine (Ruffolo). The family lived in Brooklyn until 1943, when they moved to Hempstead after Andy purchased Hempstead Recreation, a 14-lane bowling center. After Alice's death in 1960, Varipapa lived with Lorraine's family in Plainview until 1976, then with Connie's family in Huntington Bay until he died on August 25, 1984, at the age of 93.

Varipapa never smoked and rarely drank, a rarity among someone who spent so much time in bowling alleys. His health was such that after gallbladder surgery in 1956, his surgeon remarked that Andy's "blood pressure, vital capacity, muscular reflexes, and pulse rate were those of a younger man." Varipapa credited his good health to daily bowling and moderation in everything.

In 1951, using seed money from his father, Frank Varipapa partnered with former Brunswick salesman Stan Lewis and opened Bowl Mart on Jericho Turnpike in Mineola, one of bowling's first "pro shops." The concept of custom-fit bowling balls was relatively new, and the business thrived as bowling became increasingly popular in the 1950s. In 1960, the company expanded to 11 locations in four states, and when Frank died in 1988, he still owned the flagship store in Mineola.

== In popular culture ==
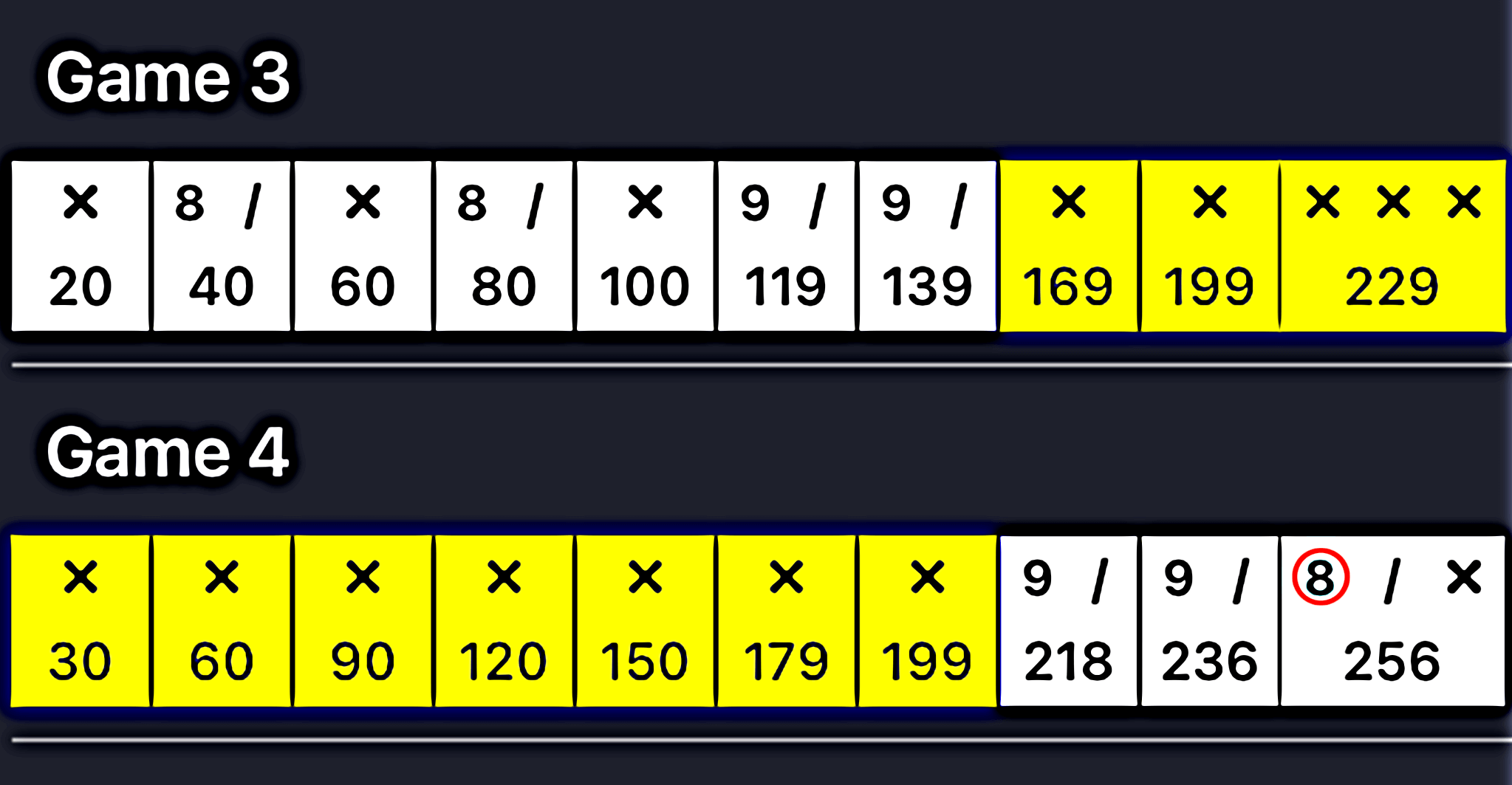
An "Andy Varipapa 300" game, highlighted in yellow

- The phrase "Varipapa 300" became part of the bowling lexicon due to a quote often attributed to Andy: “If I throw 12 strikes in a row over two games, in my mind, it is a 300 game.”
- Varipapa appeared on What's My Line. He signed in as "Mister X," and none of panelists recognized him, nor were able to figure out his identity after the 10 allotted questions. With his shock of white hair and Italian accent, panelist Henry Morgan thought Andy was the physical culturist Charles Atlas.
- On January 18, 1982, Varipapa's name was mentioned on the CBS hit show M*A*S*H. Corporal Maxwell Klinger (played by Jamie Farr) said to Colonel Sherman Potter (Harry Morgan), “What a day for us! I haven’t been this excited since Andy Varipapa came to Toledo for a trick bowling exhibition.”
- In 2015, Wheaties made Varipapa the centerpiece of a series of commercials., where he was identified only as "Grandpa". Varipapa's shots from Bowling Tricks were overlaid with a narrator's voice criticizing millennial behavior. In one, the narrator states, "Grandpa wasn’t allergic to cats, or dust, or pollen. He was allergic to whiners. And losing.”

== Bibliography ==
- Gerstner, Glenn. Andy Varipapa: Bowling’s First Superstar. Jefferson, NC: McFarland, 2024.
- Grasso, John and Eric R. Hartman. Historical Dictionary of Bowling. New York: Rowman & Littlefield, 2013.
- Hurley, Andrew. Diners, Bowling Alleys, and Trailer Parks: Chasing the American Dream in Postwar Consumer Culture. New York: Basic Books, 2001.
- Kogan, Rick. Brunswick: The Story of an American Company from 1948 to 1985. Skokie, IL: Brunswick, 1985.
- Marks, Lou. The Bowling Experience. Boyton Beach, FL: Goldmark, 1987.
- Miller, Mark, ed. The Bowlers’ Encyclopedia. Greenvale, WI: American Bowling Congress, 1995.
- Schmidt, J.R. The Bowling Chronicles: Collected Writings of Dr. Jake. Jefferson, NC: McFarland, 2017.
- Varipapa, Andy, and Nick Tronsky. Andy Varipapa’s Quick Way to Better Bowling. Edited by Tom McLaughlin. Rev. ed. Bronx, NY: Ishi Press, 2015.
- Weiskopf, Herman. The Perfect Game: The World of Bowling. Englewood Cliffs, NJ: Prentice-Hall, 1978.

== Official Website ==
https://andyvaripapa.com
