= Pigskin Champions =

- Movie poster
- Directed by: Charles G. Clarke
- Produced by: Pete Smith
- Production company: Metro-Goldwyn-Mayer
- Release date: August 13, 1937
- Country: United States
- Language: English

Pigskin Champions is a 1937 sports short subject documentary directed by Charles G. Clarke and produced by Metro-Goldwyn-Mayer. It featured the then-World Champion Green Bay Packers in an exhibition of football skills. It premiered in Green Bay, Wisconsin on August 13, 1937. The film featured prominent players from the team, such as Curly Lambeau, Arnie Herber, Don Hutson, and Clarke Hinkle, performing difficult passes and kicks, as well as various workouts and drills.
