= The Private Life of the Gannets =

1934 film

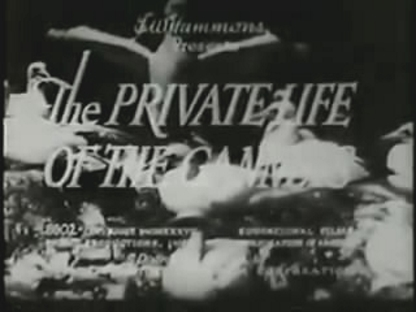
- Intertitle
- Directed by: Julian Huxley
- Written by: Ronald Lockley
- Produced by: Alexander Korda
- Starring: A. L. Alexander
- Cinematography: Osmond Borradaile; John Grierson
- Music by: Muir Mathieson
- Production company: London Film Productions
- Release date: 1934
- Running time: 10 minutes
- Country: United Kingdom
- Language: English

The Private Life of the Gannets is a 1934 British short documentary film, directed by Julian Huxley, about a colony of Northern Gannets (Morus bassanus) on the small rocky island of Grassholm, off the coast of Wales. It received a special mention at the 3rd Venice International Film Festival in 1935 and won the Best Short Subject (One-Reel) at the 10th Academy Awards in 1938. The title was chosen by producer Alexander Korda as a reference to The Private Life of Henry VIII (1933), his breakthrough film of the previous year.

The "truly landmark film," provides, according to WildFilmHistory, "an absorbing and atmospheric account," by combining "close-up, slow motion and aerial shots." This "groundbreaking footage ... shot with the support of the Royal Navy ... reveals the incredible private lives of these birds as they squabble over territory, perform spectacular dives and regurgitate fish for their young." The production was headed by renowned biologist Julian Huxley, who enlisted "some of the top figures in the British scientific and cinematic world" for what "is classed by many as the world's first natural history documentary, its thorough and academic approach a stark contrast to the expedition format of its predecessors." "A comprehensive insight into a fascinating creature," it was the first wildlife film to receive an Academy Award.
