= Aquatic House Party =

1949 film

- Directed by: Ernest Corts
- Produced by: Jack Eaton
- Distributed by: Paramount Pictures
- Release date: March 31, 1950
- Running time: 10 minutes
- Country: United States
- Language: English

Aquatic House Party is a 1950 American short film directed by Ernest Corts and produced by Jack Eaton, part of the Grantland Rice Sportlights series. It was narrated by Bill Slater and featured Helen Morgan.

It won an Oscar for Best Short Subject (One-Reel) at the 22nd Academy Awards in 1949.
