= Wanted – A Master =

1936 film

- Directed by: Arthur J. Ornitz; Gunther von Fritsch
- Produced by: Pete Smith
- Narrated by: Pete Smith
- Music by: William Axt
- Distributed by: MGM
- Release date: December 1936
- Running time: 10 minutes
- Country: United States
- Language: English

Wanted – A Master is a 1936 American short film directed by Arthur J. Ornitz and Gunther von Fritsch, released as part of the Pete Smith Specialties series. It was nominated at the 1936 9th Academy Awards for Best Short Subject (One-Reel).

== Plot ==
When Hector, a stray dog living in a junk yard, reads in a newspaper that all strays will be exterminated by 3 o' clock that afternoon, he goes in search of an owner.

== Cast ==
- Pete Smith as narrator / voice of Hector
- Horace B. Carpenter as boy's father
- Dave O'Brien as man in diner who feeds Hector
