= Quicker'n a Wink =

1940 film

- Directed by: George Sidney
- Written by: Buddy Adler
- Produced by: Pete Smith
- Starring: Clarence Curtis; Harold E. Edgerton
- Narrated by: Pete Smith
- Cinematography: Harold E. Edgerton; Walter Lundin
- Edited by: Philip W. Anderson
- Distributed by: MGM
- Release date: October 12, 1940
- Running time: 10 minutes
- Country: United States
- Language: English

Quicker'n a Wink is a 1940 American short documentary film in the Pete Smith Specialities series about stroboscopic photography and the work of Doc Edgerton, a professor at the Massachusetts Institute of Technology. The film was written by Buddy Adler and directed by George Sidney. In 1941, it won an Oscar for Best Short Subject (One-Reel) at the 13th Academy Awards.

== Cast ==
- Clarence Curtis (uncredited)
- Harold E. Edgerton as himself (uncredited)
- Tex Harris (uncredited)
- Charles Lacey (uncredited)
- June Preisser (uncredited)
- Pete Smith as narrator (uncredited)
