= Trick bowling =

Form of bowling

Trick bowling is a form of competitive bowling in which unusual and difficult custom setups are used. Trick bowling often involves special pin setup, multiple bowling balls, or obstacles placed on the lane.

Trick Bowling has a rich history in bowling leagues across the country, and has more recently become a staple of the world's most popular and largest professional bowling league, the Professional Bowlers Association (PBA).

== Popular trick shots ==
Multiple pin strike: As opposed to the standard 10-pin bowling setup, this trick is set up with more than 10 pins (usually to 30 to over 100 pins) in the same triangular formation as the standard 10-pin setup and played on an open area instead of a bowling lane. The bowler usually releases the ball with a great strength and/or a precision technique to ensure that the ball has enough strength to start a chain reaction that will knock down all pins. This trick is often implemented in bowling video games, with Wii Sports being the most famous example.

Spinning-ball spare conversion: The bowler spins one ball slowly down the lane, and sends a second ball down the lane normally. The second ball is meant to knock down nine pins, while the first slowly spun ball picks up the spare.

Towel shot: A shot perfected by PBA Legend Norm Duke. The bowler wraps the ball in a handtowel, and releases it in a slingshot-like manner down the lane. This shot is very difficult because the bowler has no fingers in the ball, and it is very difficult to create spin and maintain accuracy.

Multiple balls: A bowler will take three or more balls in one hand and attempt to knock down as many pins as possible pick up a difficult split.

Off-hand bowl: The bowler takes the ball and bowls it with his off hand, or the hand he would not normally bowl with. For instance, a right-handed bowler bowling with his or her left hand.

Backwards approach shot: The bowler, facing away from the pins, throws the ball between his legs without looking down the lane.

Marked shots: The bowler will place a marker on the lane, the most common being a small piece of tape, and the ball must cross over that marker before knocking down the pins.

Reduced finger shots: Instead of putting the normal two fingers and a thumb in the ball, the bowler will use only two, or even one finger in the ball and roll it down the lane trying to knock down the required number of pins, usually a spare pickup.

Prop shots: A prop shot is where the bowler places an object or person in the lane to create an obstacle for the shot and make it more difficult. The most common props are chairs and people. Chairs are set up in the lane, and the bowler must either bowl over them or through the legs. For people, the most common setup is to bowl through their legs.. A variation of this trick is to throw the ball to the air from a distance, and landing onto the lane.

Flying eagle: A variation of the hardest spare pickup in bowling: the 7–10 split. This shot requires two lanes. The 7 pin is set up in the lane that the bowler throws the ball down, while the 10 pin is set up in the lane to the right. Another pin is set up further up in the lane with the 7 pin. The bowler must hit the lead pin, send it flying into the adjacent lane to knock down the 10 pin, and the ball must continue through and hit the 7 pin.

== Trick bowling at the professional level ==
In the days before the PBA's existence, Andy Varipapa was well known for his trick bowling. More recently, the PBA brought trick bowling to the national spotlight by creating a trick bowling competition, similar to the All-Star games of other professional sports leagues, the National Basketball Association, Major League Baseball, National Football League, and National Hockey League. The PBA's trick bowling competition is known as the "skills challenge." Some of the PBA's top bowlers have participated in the competition, including Parker Bohn III, Norm Duke, Chris Barnes, Del Ballard, Jr., Wes Malott, Doug Kent, Brian Voss, Danny Wiseman and Chris Johnson.

The format in the skills challenge is like a game of "horse" in basketball. One bowler attempts the trick shot, and his opponent has the chance to match it. If the opponent cannot match the challenger's shot, the challenger gets a point. The first bowler to three points wins.

== Changes in format ==
In the 2006-2007 Skills Challenge, the format changed from a head-to-head style competition to a team-based competition, with teams of two. This added a new dynamic to the competition, because partners could bowl together and create more difficult shots.

However, after negative reactions from the fanbase, the format was changed back to head-to-head in the 2007-2008 competition.

== PBA Skills Challenge Champions ==
2004-2005: Chris Barnes

2005-2006: Norm Duke

2006-2007: Doug Kent and Danny Wiseman

2007-2008: Chris Barnes
