= Swing High =

1932 film

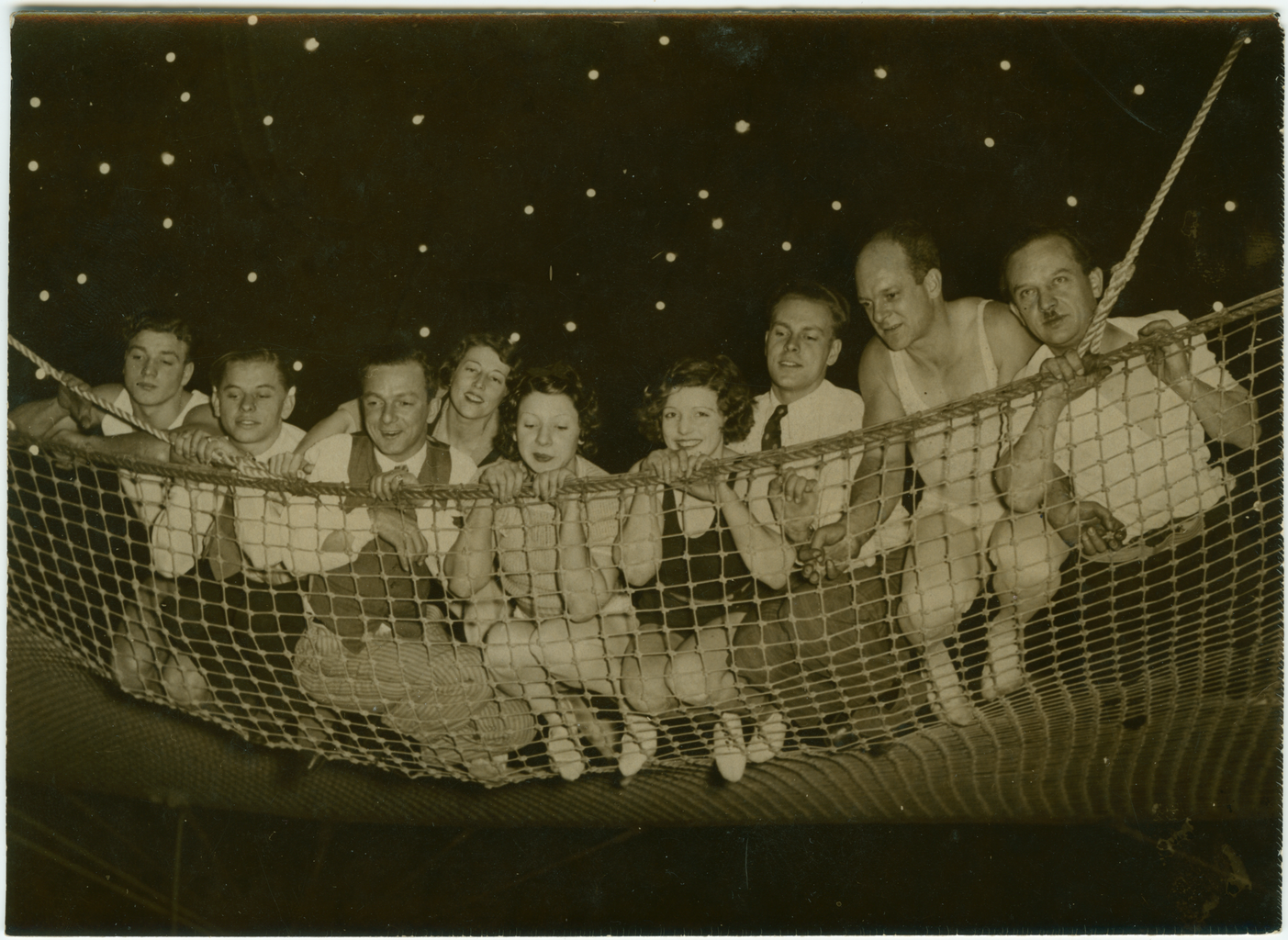
- The Flying Codonas
- Directed by: Jack Cummings
- Produced by: Pete Smith
- Starring: The Flying Codonas
- Distributed by: MGM
- Release date: November 12, 1932
- Running time: 10 minutes
- Country: United States
- Language: English

Swing High is a 1932 American Pre-Code short documentary film directed by Jack Cummings. In 1932, it was nominated for an Academy Award at the 5th Academy Awards for Best Short Subject (Novelty). The film documents The Flying Codonas, a family of flying trapeze artists. The video can be viewed in full on Youtube which was uploaded by a family member.

== Cast ==
- Pete Smith as narrator (voice)
- The Flying Codonas as Themselves:

Edward Codona as himself
Lalo Codona as himself
Alfredo Codona as himself
Vera Codona as herself
