= Pete Smith (film producer) =

American film producer (1892–1979)

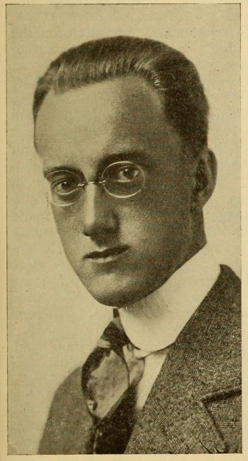
- Smith in a 1918 issue of The Moving Picture World
- Born: Peter Schmidt; September 4, 1892; New York City, U.S.
- Died: January 12, 1979 (aged 86); Santa Monica, California, U.S.
- Occupations: Producer and narrator of short subjects, Publicist
- Years active: 1931–1955
- Known for: Pete Smith Specialties
- Spouses: Marjorie Ganss (m. 1918; died 1957) Anne Dunster (m. 1962–1979)
- Children: 1
- Awards: Academy Award for Best Live Action Short Film (1938, 1941); Academy Honorary Award (1953)

Peter Schmidt (September 4, 1892 – January 12, 1979), Americanized to Pete Smith, was a film producer based in Hollywood, California. He is best known for the Pete Smith Specialties, a long-running series of general-interest short films, ranging from human-interest stories to sports subjects. Best remembered are the comedies, exaggerating common pet peeves and household problems, with Smith offering pointed commentary in his distinctive, nasal tenor.

== Early life and career ==
Peter Schmidt was born in 1892, in New York City. He became interested in the theatrical business, working behind the scenes as an aide for a vaudeville performers union, an editor and critic for a trade magazine, and a press agent. In 1915, as the new field of motion pictures was transforming show business, Smith became a publicity man for Bosworth, Inc., Oliver Morosco Photoplay Co., Artcraft Pictures Corporation, and Famous Players–Lasky. He was one of the founding members of the Associated Motion Picture Advertisers. By 1925 Smith was the manager of publicity for Louis B. Mayer of Metro-Goldwyn-Mayer (MGM).

In 1929, producer Jules White and his partner Zion Myers conceived the Dogville Comedies, featuring trained dogs in satires of then-current films (the successful musical The Broadway Melody became The Dogway Melody, for example). Pete Smith was pressed into service to provide some of the comic voices for the soundtracks. This led him into the field of voice-over work, and he narrated some of MGM's sports reels. As a lark, Smith embellished the action by running certain scenes in reverse and adding his own wisecracking comments. Beginning in 1933 MGM offered Goofy Movies, a series of short comedies based on antique silent films. Pete Smith received screen credit in these shorts, which he narrated in florid style. In 1935 Smith introduced the concept of 3D movies to audiences, by offering explanatory remarks in the "MGM Miniature" Audioscopiks.

=== Pete Smith Specialties ===
Because of Smith's flair for comedy, MGM gave him his own series, Pete Smith Specialties. He produced and narrated dozens of movie short subjects for MGM from 1935 to 1955.

Most of Smith's movies were one reel in length (9 to 11 minutes). Short subjects were shown before a feature film in movie houses and theaters. The diverse subject matter Smith featured in these shorts were Emily Post-style household hints, insect life seen through a microscope, military training and hardware (during World War II), and dancing lessons. There were even several "series-within-the-series", such as general-knowledge quizzes, professional-football news, and features concerning different kinds of animals (Donkey Baseball and Social Sea Lions). During the war effort, Smith narrated a patriotic short movie for the U.S. Government, The Tree In a Test Tube (1943), filmed in color, featuring Laurel and Hardy in a demonstration of household wood products, with Smith explaining the various exhibits for the viewer.

In October 1943 Melville Danner, owner of a 250-seat theater in Granite, Oklahoma, printed an open letter to MGM, suggesting that Pete Smith should make a short subject about people who behave badly in theaters. Motion Picture Herald gave the suggestion a special headline: "Assignment for Pete Smith." Smith took the suggestion and made Movie Pests (1944), with Dave O'Brien exemplifying the inconsiderate patron who causes problems for everyone around him. The short was so successful that it inspired three sequels: Guest Pests (1945), Bus Pests (1945), and Neighbor Pests (1947).

Poster for his 1936 short subject movie Audioscopiks

Dave O'Brien became the primary actor in the Pete Smith Specialties during the 1940s. The hapless O'Brien would personify everyday nuisances: demonstrating pet peeves, tackling hazardous home-improvement projects, and having other problems with which the audience could identify. O'Brien's scenes were silent, compelling O'Brien to express his satisfaction or frustration entirely in visual terms as narrator Smith offered commentary. O'Brien knew the format so well that he also directed many of the short movies, using the name "David Barclay". He staged many of the sight gags himself, taking stupendous falls for the camera.

The Pete Smith Specialties earned 14 Academy Award nominations and two Best Live Action Short Film Academy Awards. At the 26th Academy Awards, Smith was awarded an Academy Honorary Award "for his witty and pungent observations on the American scene in his series of Pete Smith Specialties."

Smith announced his retirement in 1954. The MGM unit that produced the Pete Smith Specialties was terminated the next year, a casualty of short movies' decreasing popularity at the time. The final film in the series was a tribute to Dave O'Brien, featuring a collection of his spectacular stunts and pratfalls. The reel was appropriately titled The Fall Guy (1955).

== Personal life ==
Smith, under his birth name Peter J. Schmidt, married Marjorie Ganss on February 6, 1919, in Manhattan. They had one son, Douglas Mosely Schmidt (1919–1984), who later became a technician for RKO. Smith and Ganss remained married until her death in 1957. Smith's second marriage was to his secretary, Anne Dunster, whom he married in Las Vegas in October 1962.

== Later years and death ==
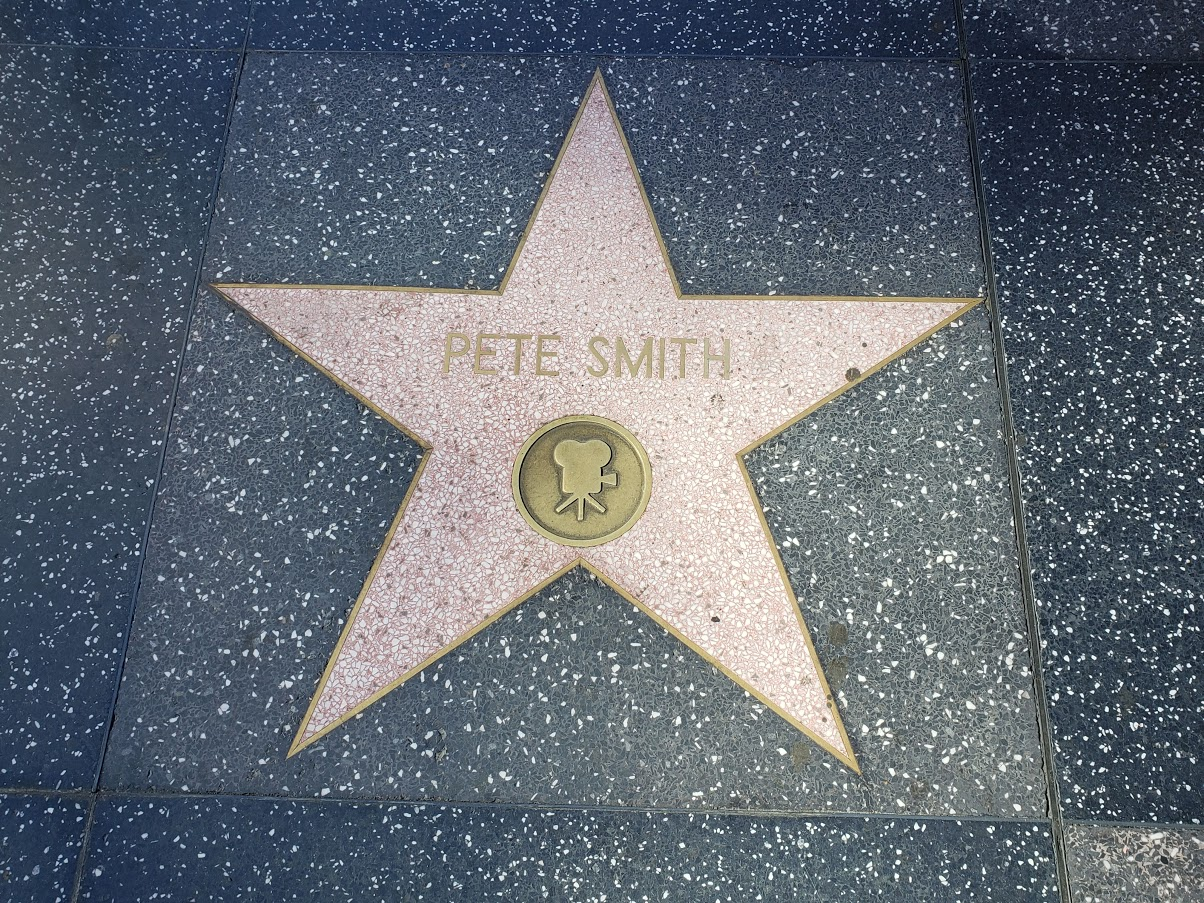
Smith's star on the Hollywood Walk of Fame

Smith spent his later years in poor health at a convalescent home in Santa Monica, California. On January 12, 1979, he committed suicide by leaping off the building's roof. He was survived by his second wife, Anne, and his son Douglas.

For his contribution to the movie industry, Smith received a star symbol on the Hollywood Walk of Fame, at 1621 Vine Street.

== Selected filmography ==
Year	Title	Role	Notes
1931	Fishermen's Paradise	Narrator	Producer
1931	Whippet Racing	Narrator	Producer
1931	Wild and Woolly	Narrator	Producer
1932	Color Scales	Narrator	Producer
1932	Desert Regatta	Narrator	Producer
1932	Trout Fishing	Narrator	Producer
1932	Microscopic Mysteries	Narrator	Producer
1932	Swing High	Narrator	Producer
1932	Fast Life	Race Announcer	Appeared as himself
1932	Snow Birds	Explanatory Remarks	
1933	Goofy-Movies Number One	Narrator	
1933	Menu	Narrator	Producer; Nominated: Academy Award for Best Short Subject, Novelty
1933	Handlebars	Narrator	Producer
1933	Fine Feathers	Narrator	Producer
1934	Goofy Movies (Parts 1 - 9)	Narrator	10 part series released February through December in 1934, with only the first 9 narrated by Smith.
1934	Roping Wild Bears	Narrator	
1934	Vital Victuals	Narrator	Producer
1934	Strikes and Spares	Narrator	Producer; Nominated: Academy Award for Best Short Subject, Novelty
1934	Pro Football	Narrator	
1935	Donkey Baseball		Producer and writer. Does not narrate
1935	La Fiesta de Santa Barbara	Narrator	Producer; Nominated: Academy Award for Best Short Subject (Color)
1935	Audioscopiks	Narrator	Producer; Nominated: Academy Award for Best Short Subject, Novelty
1935	Water Sports	Narrator	
1935	Trained Hoofs	Narrator	
1936	Wanted – A Master	Narrator/Voice of Dog	Producer; Nominated: Academy Award for Best Short Subject, One-reel
1936	Killer-Dog	Narrator	Producer
1936	Harnessed Rhythm	Narrator	
1936	Bar-Rac's Night Out	Narrator	Producer
1937	The Grand Bounce	Narrator	
1937	Candid Cameramaniacs	Narrator	Producer
1937	Penny Wisdom	Narrator	Producer; Won: Academy Award for Best Short Subject, Color
1937	Pigskin Champions	Narrator	Producer
1937	Romance of Radium	Narrator	Producer; Nominated: Academy Award for Best Short Subject, One-reel
1938	Football Thrills of 1937	Narrator	Producer, director
1938	Three on a Rope	Narrator	
1938	Fisticuffs	Narrator	Features Max Baer
1938	Hot on Ice	Narrator	Producer
1939	Football Thrills of 1938	Narrator	Producer, director
1939	Radio Hams	Narrator	Producer
1939	Let's Talk Turkey	Narrator	
1939	Poetry of Nature	Narrator	
1939	Take a Cue	Narrator	
1939	Weather Wizards	Narrator	Producer
1940	Spots Before Your Eyes	Narrator	Producer
1940	Quicker'n a Wink	Narrator	Producer; Won: Academy Award for Best Short Subject, One-reel
1941	Aeronutics	Narrator	Producer
1941	Third Dimensional Murder	Narrator	Producer
1941	Army Champions	Narrator	Producer; Nominated: Academy Award for Best Short Subject, One-reel
1941	Lions on the Loose	Narrator	Producer
1941	How to Hold Your Husband	Narrator	
1942	Acro-Batty	Narrator	Producer, writer
1942	Marines in the Making	Narrator	Producer; Nominated: Academy Award for Best Short Subject, One-reel
1942	Calling All Pa's	Narrator	
1942	Victory Quiz	Narrator	Quiz about military names. Starring in one skit a young and uncredited Alan Hale Jr. on KP duty
1943	First Aid	Narrator	
1943	Seeing Hands	Narrator	Producer; Nominated: Academy Award for Best Short Subject, One-reel
1943	The Tree in a Test Tube	Interlocutor (voice)	
1944	Movie Pests	Narrator	Producer; Nominated: Academy Award for Best Short Subject, One-reel
1944	Football Thrills of 1944	Narrator	Producer, director
1945	Hollywood Scout	Narrator	Producer
1945	Badminton	Narrator	Producer Shown exclusively within the film The Great Morgan.
1945	Bus Pests	Narrator	Producer
1946	Treasures From Trash	Narrator	Producer
1946	Gettin' Glamour	Narrator	Producer
1946	Playing by Ear	Narrator	Producer
1946	Fala at Hyde Park	Narrator	Producer
1946	I Love My Husband, But!	Narrator	Producer
1946	Sure Cures	Narrator	Producer; Nominated: Academy Award for Best Short Subject, One-reel
1946	Studio Visit	Narrator	Producer - Pete Smith Specialty
1947	Now You See It	Narrator	Producer; Nominated: Academy Award for Best Short Subject, One-reel
1947	I Love My Wife, But!	Narrator	Producer
1947	What D'ya Know?	Narrator	Producer
1947	Have You Ever Wondered?	Narrator	Producer
1948	I Love My Mother-in-Law But...	Narrator	Producer
1948	Bowling Tricks With Andy Varipapa	Narrator	Producer
1948	You Can't Win	Narrator	Producer; Nominated: Academy Award for Best Short Subject, One-reel
1948	Just Suppose	Narrator	Producer
1948	Ice Aces	Narrator	
1948	Let's Cogitate	Narrator	Producer
1949	How Come?	Narrator	Producer
1949	Water Trix	Narrator	Producer; Nominated: Academy Award for Best Short Subject, One-reel
1949	Did'ja Know? Have You Ever Wondered #3	Narrator	Producer
1950	Wrong Way Butch	Narrator	Producer; Nominated: Academy Award for Best Short Subject, One-reel
1950	A Wife's Life	Narrator	Producer
1950	Curious Contests	Narrator	Producer
1951	Bargain Madness	Narrator	Producer
1951	Bandage Bait	Narrator	Producer
1951	Fishing Feats	Narrator	Producer
1952	Gymnastic Rhythm	Narrator	Producer
1952	I Love Children, But!	Narrator	Producer
1953	The Postman	Narrator	Producer
1953	Things We Can Do Without	Narrator	Producer
1954	Do Someone a Favor!	Narrator	Producer
1954	The Camera Caught It	Narrator	Producer
1954	Rough Riding	Narrator	Producer (Color)
1954	Fish Tales	Narrator	Producer (Color)
1955	The Man Around the House	Narrator	Producer
1955	Animals in Action	Narrator	Producer
1955	Fall Guy	Narrator	Producer

== Home media availability ==
Pete Smith's short films are included as extras on DVDs of many classic Warner Home Video films of the era. These include:

- Menu - Morning Glory (1933)
- Goofy Movies, #1 - Midnight Mary (1933)
- Goofy Movies, #2 - Manhattan Melodrama (1934)
- Goofy Movies, #3 - Evelyn Prentice (1934)
- Goofy Movies, #4 - Sadie McKee (1934)
- Penny Wisdom - The Prisoner of Zenda (1937)
- Romance of Radium - Madame Curie (1943)
- Quicker 'n a Wink - Go West (1940)
- Wedding Bills - Strike Up the Band (1940)
- Flicker Memories - The Big Store (1941)
- How to Hold Your Husband - Back - Babes on Broadway (1941)
- Marines in the Making - Random Harvest (1942)
- Studio Visit - Cabin in the Sky (1943)
- Hollywood Daredevils - Girl Crazy (1943)
- Fala - The President's Dog - Lassie Come Home (1943)
- Seeing Hands - DuBarry Was a Lady (1943)
- Movie Pests - Thirty Seconds Over Tokyo (1944)
- Football Thrills of 1944 - Blu-Ray release of Anchors Aweigh (1945)
- Hollywood Scout - The Clock (1945)
- Sure Cures - Easy to Wed (1946)
- I Love My Husband, But! - Without Reservations (1946)
- Now You See It - This Time for Keeps (1947)
- Fala at Hyde Park - Hills of Home (1948)
- You Can't Win! - The Pirate (1948)
- Let's Cogitate! - Battleground (1949)
- Those Good Old Days - Madame Bovary (1949)
- Water Trix - Neptune's Daughter (1949)
- Sports Oddities - That Midnight Kiss (1949)
- Pest Control - The Stratton Story (1949)
- Crashing the Movies - Two Weeks with Love (1950)
- Did'ja Know? - Summer Stock (1950)
- Wrong Way Butch - Nancy Goes to Rio (1950)
- Curious Contests - Pagan Love Song (1950)
- Musiquiz - The Belle of New York (1952)
- Reducing - Million Dollar Mermaid (1952)
- This is a Living? - Dangerous When Wet (1953)
- Things We Can Do Without - The Naked Spur (1953)
- Ain't It Aggravatin'? - The Long, Long Trailer (1954)
- Out for Fun - Executive Suite (1954)
- The Fall Guy - Hit the Deck (1955)
