= Clark and McCullough =

1920s–30s US comedy duo

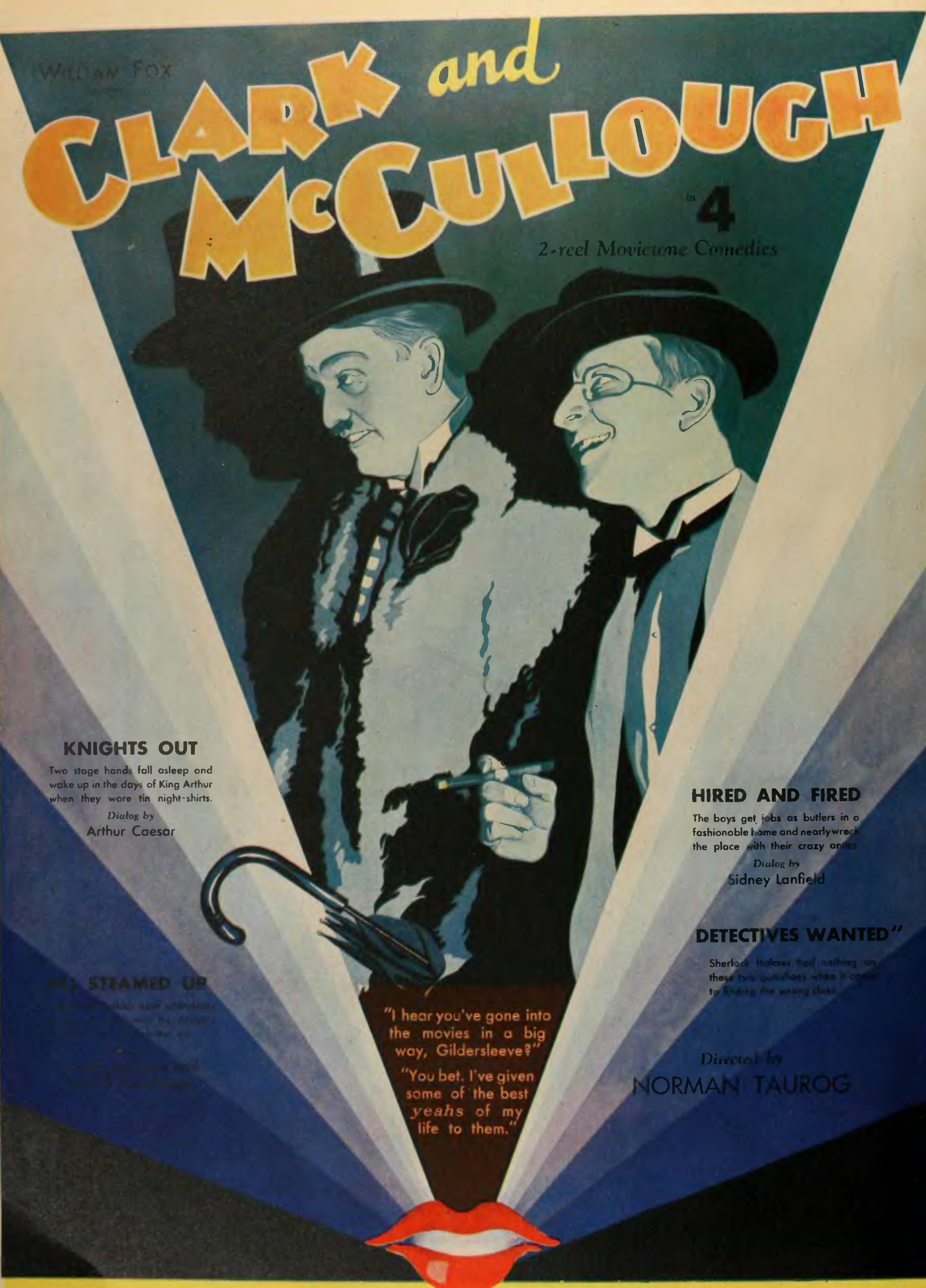
Clark and McCullough ad in The Film Daily (1929)

Clark and McCullough were a comedy team consisting of comedians Bobby Clark and Paul McCullough. They starred in a series of short films during the 1920s and 1930s. Bobby Clark was the fast-talking wisecracker with painted-on eyeglasses; Paul McCullough was his easygoing assistant named Blodgett.

Bobby Clark & Paul McCullough, in Kickin' the Crown Around (1933)

The two were childhood friends in Springfield, Ohio, and spent hours practicing tumbling and gymnastics in school. This led to their working as circus performers, then in vaudeville, and finally on Broadway. Their hit show The Ramblers (1926) was adapted as a Wheeler and Woolsey movie comedy, The Cuckoos. Clark and McCullough starred in the George Gershwin musical Strike Up the Band on Broadway in 1930.

== Motion pictures ==
In 1928, Clark and McCullough entered the new field of talking pictures, with a series of short subjects and featurettes for Fox Film Corporation. In 1930, they signed with Radio Pictures (later RKO Radio Pictures) for six two-reel comedies annually. The RKO comedies are totally dominated by Clark, barging into every scene and monopolizing much of the conversation, with his good-natured buddy McCullough quietly embellishing his partner's antics with subtler gestures and actions. Each film cast the duo in different occupations, which they would tackle enthusiastically if not efficiently. The names of Clark's characters in their films were dictated by their jobs: as lawyers Clark and McCullough were Blackstone and Blodgett, as domestic help they were Cook and Blodgett, as photographers they were Flash and Blodgett.

Clark and McCullough filmed most of their movies during the summer months, so they could be free to do stage revues during the rest of the year. They appeared in three Broadway shows while their film contract was in force.

== McCullough's death and beyond ==
Clark and McCullough had completed their last series of comedies in 1935, and McCullough sought treatment for severe depression. After he was released from a sanitarium in March 1936, McCullough visited a barber shop where he grabbed a razor, and committed suicide by cutting his throat and wrists. Clark was forced to pursue a solo career; he appeared in Samuel Goldwyn's 1938 musical comedy The Goldwyn Follies (wearing actual eyeglasses instead of his trademark painted-on glasses) and reestablished himself on Broadway as a solo comedian in such revues as Streets of Paris and Mexican Hayride. Clark continued to appear on stage and television into the 1950s; RKO reissued the old Clark & McCullough shorts to theaters in 1950 and 1951, to capitalize on Clark's new popularity. Clark died in 1960.

== Films ==
- Two Flaming Youths (Paramount; 1927 feature film; also appearing were W. C. Fields and Moran and Mack)
- Clark and McCullough in the Interview (Fox; 1928 one-reel short)
- Clark and McCullough in the Honor System (Fox; 1928 one-reel short)
- The Bath Between (Fox; 1929 short)
- The Diplomats (Fox; 1929 short)
- Waltzing Around (Fox; 1929 short)
- In Holland (Fox; 1929 short)
- Belle of Samoa (Fox; 1929 short)
- Beneath the Law (Fox; 1929 short)
- The Medicine Men (Fox; 1929)
- Music Fiends (Fox; 1929 short)
- Knights Out (Fox; 1929 short)
- All Steamed Up (Fox; 1929 short)
- Hired and Fired (Fox; 1929 short)
- Detectives Wanted (Fox; 1929 short)
- A Peep On The Deep (RKO; 1930 short)
- Chesterfield Celebrities (Warner Brothers-Vitaphone; 1931 one-reel commercial short)
- False Roomers (RKO; 1931 short)
- A Melon-Drama (RKO; 1931 short)
- Scratch-As-Catch-Can (RKO; 1931 short)
- The Iceman’s Ball (RKO; 1932 short)
- The Millionaire Cat (RKO; 1932 short)
- Jitters the Butler (RKO; 1932 short)
- Hokus Focus (RKO; 1933 short)
- The Druggist’s Dilemma (RKO; 1933 short)
- The Gay Nighties (RKO; 1933 short)
- Kickin' the Crown Around (RKO; 1933 short)
- Fits in a Fiddle (RKO; 1933 short)
- Snug in the Jug (RKO; 1933 short)
- Hey Nanny Nanny (RKO; 1934 short)
- In the Devil's Doghouse (RKO; 1934 short)
- Bedlam of Beards (RKO; 1934 short)
- Love and Hisses (RKO; 1934 short)
- Odor in the Court (RKO; 1934 short)
- Everything's Ducky (RKO; 1934 short)
- In a Pig's Eye (RKO; 1934 short)
- Flying Down to Zero (RKO; 1935 short)
- Alibi Bye Bye (RKO; 1935 short)
