= Strike Up the Band (musical) =

1927 stage musical

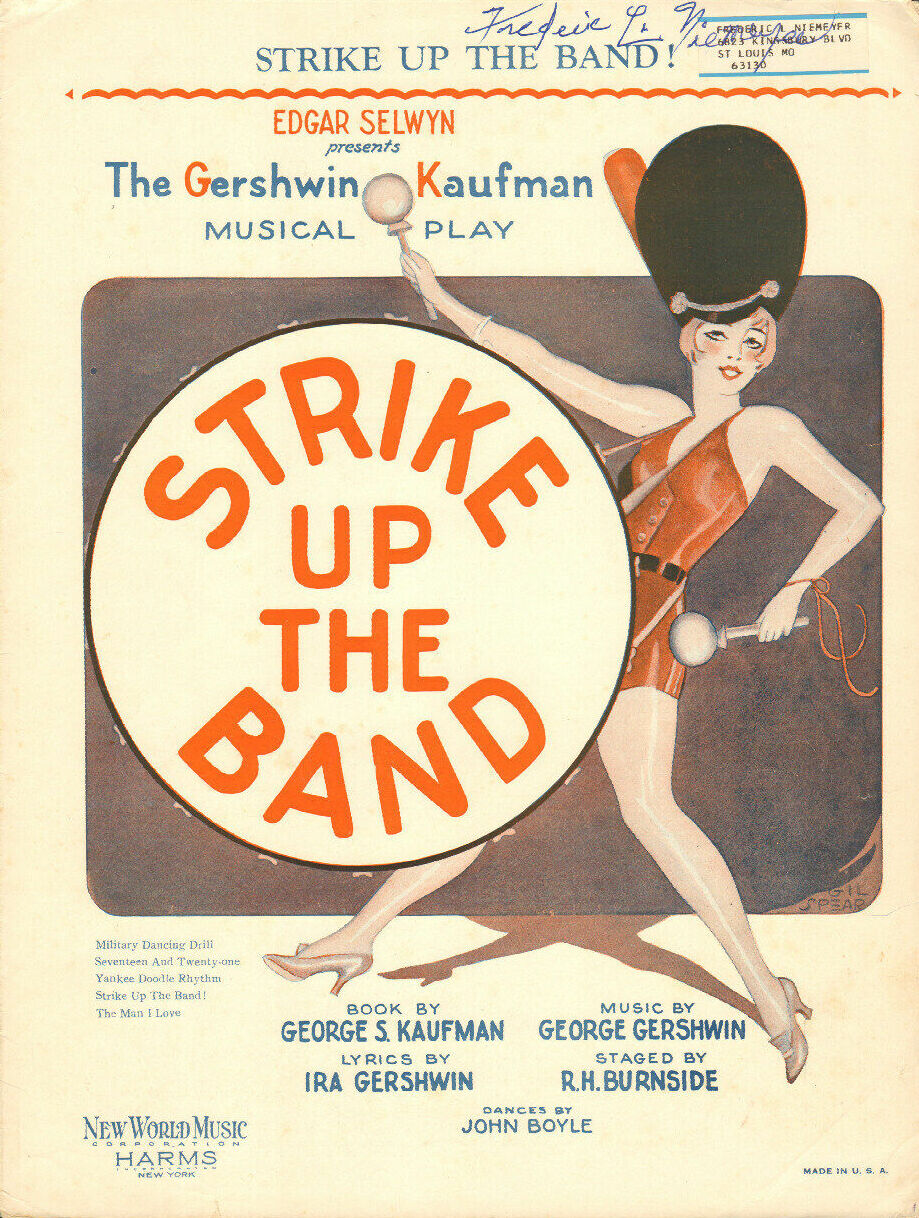
- Original 1927 Sheet Music
- Music: George Gershwin
- Lyrics: Ira Gershwin
- Book: Morrie Ryskind (1930 production)
- Productions: 1930 Broadway; 1998 Encores! 2002 Off-Broadway

Strike Up the Band is a 1927 musical with a book by Morrie Ryskind, lyrics by Ira Gershwin and music by George Gershwin. It first ran as a satirical show in Philadelphia that year, unsuccessfully, and on Broadway in 1930 after the original book by George S. Kaufman was revised by Ryskind. The show concerned a cheese manufacturer who sponsors a war against Switzerland because it will be named after him. Much of the satire of the 1927 version was replaced in the new version by silliness, leading Ryskind to recall, "What I had to do, in a sense, was to rewrite War and Peace for the Three Stooges." In the 1930 version the opening of Act I of the musical was reset from a cheese factory to a chocolate factory, and much of the work was re-imagined as occurring during a dream sequence.

Aside from the title tune, the 1940 Judy Garland-Mickey Rooney musical film Strike Up the Band had no relation to the stage production.

The overture is often performed as a stand-alone concert work.

== Libretto ==
The original book by George S. Kaufman centered on Horace J. Fletcher, a Babbitt-like cheese tycoon who tries to maintain his monopoly on the American market by convincing the United States government to declare war on Switzerland. The story ended darkly.

The 1930 plot by Ryskind, softened the political overtones, increased the emphasis on romance and added a happy ending. It relegated the war plot to a dream sequence. The incident that incites war concerned chocolate instead of cheese.

=== 1927 ===
==== Act 1 ====
Workers at the Horace J. Fletcher American Cheese Company sing their daily vocal exercises ("Fletcher's American Cheese Choral Society") to start the day and greet the foreman Timothy Harper, manager C. Edgar Sloan, and owner Horace J. Fletcher. Fletcher is pleased with the President signing a new bill imposing a fifty percent tariff on imported cheese. Mrs. Draper arrives to ask Fletcher to do charitable work with her in order to get close to him. Her daughter Anne goes to meet Timothy, though her mother disapproves of the relationship ("17 and 21"). Fletcher receives news that someplace called "Switzerland" has sent a telegram protesting the tariff. Fletcher tells Sloane to send a messenger to the hotel of Colonel Holmes, the President's adviser. Mr. Fletcher's daughter Joan enters and wants him to handle James Townsend, a reporter who wrote an article calling her a snob. After she leaves, Townsend arrives to interview Fletcher about Switzerland's response to the tariff.

== Production ==
During its original 1927 pre-Broadway tryouts, the political satire closed in Philadelphia, fulfilling original librettist's George S. Kaufman's definition of satire as "what closes on Saturday night." The original is heavily influenced by Gilbert and Sullivan.

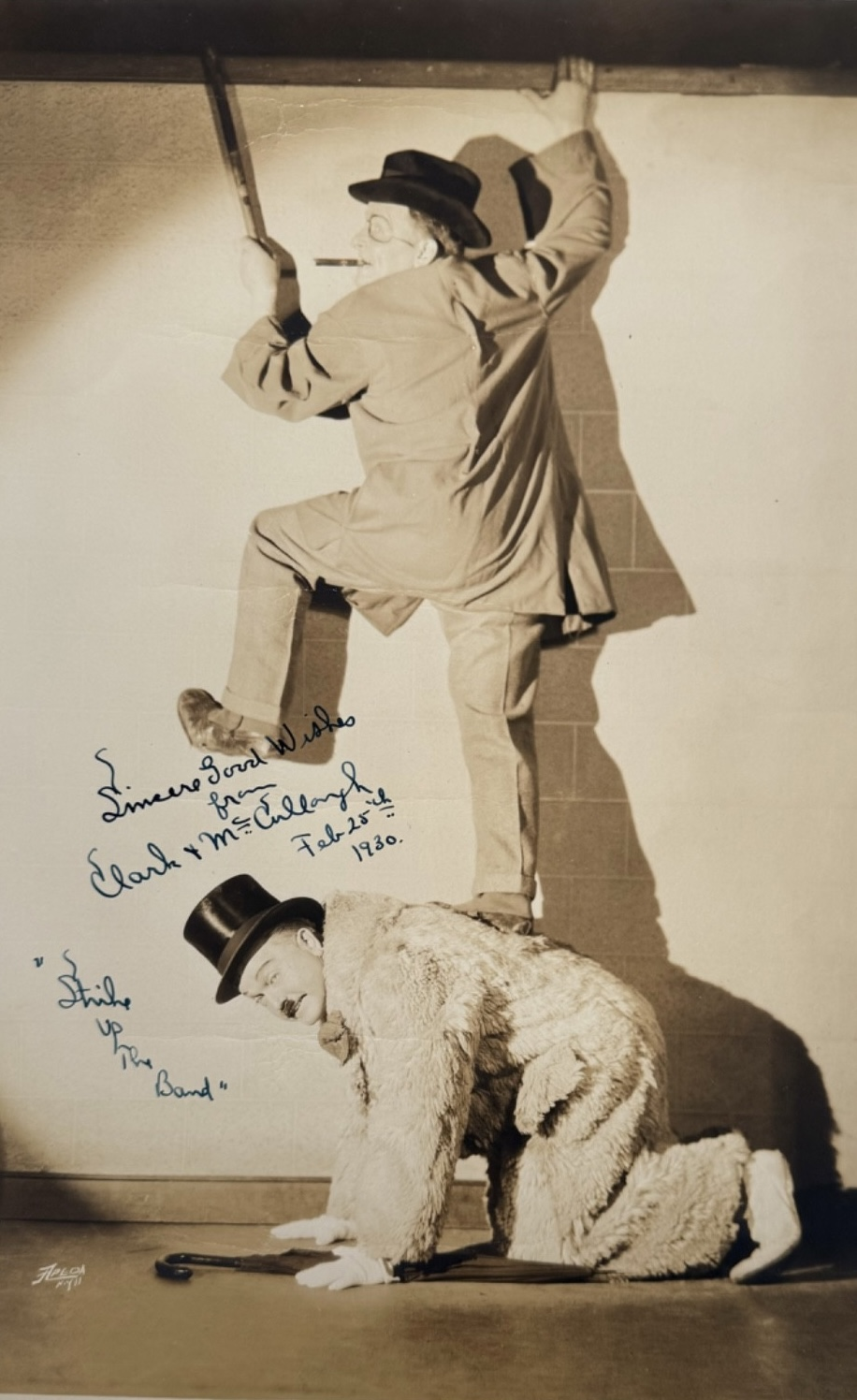
Clark and McCullough Strike Up The Band (1930) Photo Inscribed By Clark

The Gershwins revised the story with Ryskind for the 1930 Broadway run; they also removed the song "The Man I Love", now a Gershwin standard, from the show. They added a dozen new songs and rewrote the lyrics or changed the melodies of many of the 1927 songs. The new score is less Gilbert-and-Sullivan and more swing-influenced. Directed by Alexander Leftwich and choreographed by George Hale, the revised production opened on Broadway at the Times Square Theatre on January 14, 1930, and closed on June 28, 1930, after a moderately successful run of 191 performances. The show was stolen by Clark and McCullough, abetted by Dudley Clements and Blanche Ring.

== Casts ==
Character	Out of Town Tryout	Original Broadway Production	California Music Theatre Production	Studio Cast Recording	Goodspeed Musicals Production	Encores! Production	Reprise Theatre Company Production	Studio Cast Recording	Musicals Tonight! Concert Production
Character	1927	1930	1988	1990	1995	1998	2001	2011	2013
Horace J. Fletcher	Herbert Corthell	Dudley Clements	Tom Bosley	Don Chastain	Ron Holgate	Philip Bosco	Charles Nelson Reilly	Don Chastain	William Thomas Evans
Jim Townsend	Roger Pryor	Jerry Goff	Michael Magnusen	Brent Barrett	Jason Danieley	Jason Danieley	Michael Maguire	Brent Barrett	Josh Canfield
Joan Fletcher	Vivian Hart	Margaret Schilling	Roxann Parker	Rebecca Luker	Emily Loesser	Judy Kuhn	Melissa Dye	Rebecca Luker	Natalie Newman
Mrs. Grace Draper	Edna May Oliver	Blanche Ring	Fay DeWitt	Beth Fowler	?	Lynn Redgrave	Ruth Williamson	Beth Fowler	Joan Barber
Anne Draper	Dorothea James	Doris Carson	Beverly Ward	Juliet Lambert	Kristin Chenoweth	Kristin Chenoweth	Hope Levy	Juliet Lambert	Chelsea Baker
Timothy Harper	Max Hoffmann, Jr.	Gordon Smith	Kirby Ward	Jason Graae	?	David Elder	Troy Britton Johnson	Jason Graae	Michael Padgett
Man About Town / Colonel Holmes	Lew Hearn	Bobby Clark	Avery Schreiber	Charles Goff	?	David Schramm	Steve Vinovich	Charles Goff	?
Man About Town / Gideon	Jimmy Savo (as George Spelvin)	Paul McCullough	Bobby Herbeck (as George Spelvin)	Jeff Lyons	Jim Corti (as George Spelvin)	Ross Lehman (as George Spelvin)	Joe Joyce (as George Spelvin)	Jeff Lyons	Mario X. Soto (as George Spelvin)
Richard K. Sloane	Robert Bentley	Robert Bentley	Don Most	James Rocco	?	David Garrison	Stuart Pankin	James Rocco	?
Myra Meade	?	Ethel Kenyon	—N/a	—N/a	—N/a	—N/a	—N/a	—N/a	—N/a

== Score ==
The Gershwins' first fully integrated score for a book musical was influenced by the operettas of Gilbert and Sullivan. The pit band was the Red Nichols Orchestra, which included Benny Goodman, Glenn Miller, Gene Krupa, Jimmy Dorsey, and Jack Teagarden.

The overture is often performed alone as a concert work.

The title song, "Strike Up the Band", was given to the University of California, Los Angeles by the Gershwins in 1936 as "Strike Up the Band for UCLA" and has become one of the school songs.

In 1990, a studio cast recording of the original 1927 score (and some of the 1930 songs), featuring Rebecca Luker, Brent Barrett, Beth Fowler and Don Chastain, was released on the Nonesuch label. At the same time, the 1930 version was recorded with the same cast but not released. This recording was finally released in 2011 by PS Classics.

=== 1927 song list ===
Overture

Act I

- Fletcher's American Cheese Choral Society
- 17 And 21
- Typical Self-Made American
- Meadow Serenade
- Unofficial Spokesman
- Patriotic Rally
- The Man I Love
- Yankee Doodle Rhythm
- 17 And 21 (Reprise)
- Act I Finaletto
- Strike Up the Band

Act II

- Oh This Is Such A Lovely War
- Hoping That Someday You'd Care
- Come-Look-At-The-War
- Military Dancing Drill
- How About A Man?
- Act II Finaletto
- Homeward Bound/The Girl I Love (Reprise of The Man I Love)
- The War That Ended War
- Finale Ultimo

=== 1930 song list ===
Overture

Act I

- Fletcher's American Chocolate Choral Society
- I Mean to Say
- Typical Self-Made American
- Soon
- A Man of High Degree
- The Unofficial Spokesman
- Three Cheers for the Union
- This Could Go On For Years
- If I Became the President
- Soon (Reprise)
- (What's the Use of) Hanging Around with You?
- He Knows Milk
- Strike Up the Band

Act II

- In the Rattle of the Battle
- Military Dancing Drill
- Mademoiselle from New Rochelle
- I've Got a Crush on You
- (How About a Boy) Like Me?
- Official Resume
- Ring a Ding Dong Bell (Ding Dong)

== Arrangements ==
Music from Strike Up the Band has frequently been re-arranged for performance by different types of musical ensembles.

Don Rose, using Gershwin's original score and notes, augmented the orchestration of the overture to facilitate a performance by a full symphony orchestra (which features more players than a traditional pit orchestra). This version is the one commonly performed by symphony orchestras.

Luther Henderson and Sammy Nestico created arrangement for Brass ensemble. Désiré Dondeyne made an arrangement for wind Orchestra, Warren Barker for Concert band. Martin Caron, member of Duo Caron did a transcription for formation four pianists-eight hands. Also note Gerry Mulligan, Mark Hayes (Choir arrangement) and Carl Strommen (Arrangement for wind instruments). Soon was included in a Gershwin ballad medley recorded by the Modern Jazz Quartet.
