= May Boley =

American actress (1881–1963)

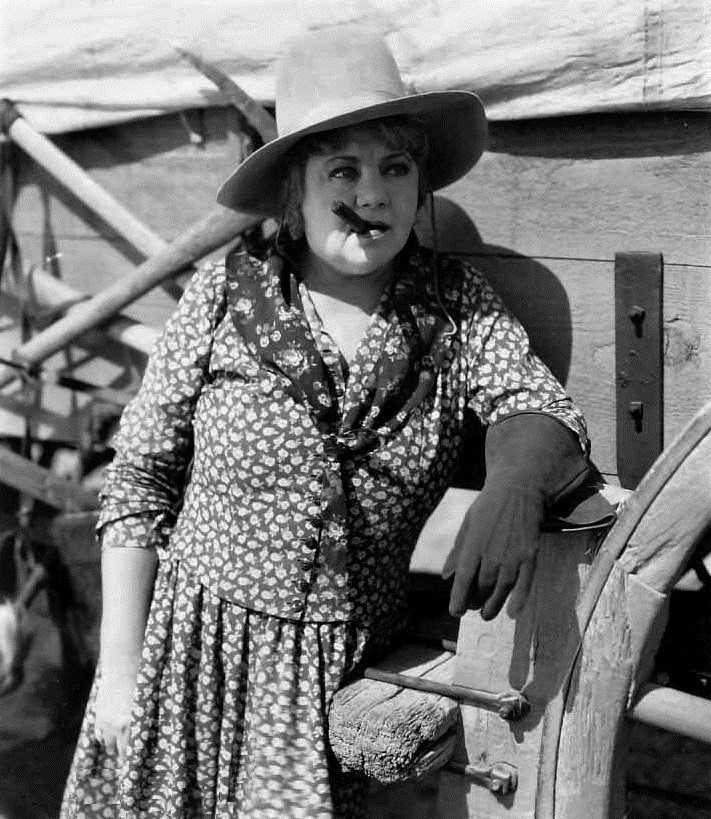
- May Boley in Fighting Caravans (1931)
- Born: May Blossom Boley; May 29, 1881; Washington, District of Columbia, U.S.
- Died: January 7, 1963 (aged 81); Hollywood, California, U.S.
- Occupation: Actress
- Spouse: Lt. Frederick Lindsley Nicholson (1901–?)

May Blossom Boley (May 29, 1881 – January 7, 1963) was an American actress known for her role as Whale Oil Rosie in Moby Dick (1930).

== Stage ==
Besides being an actress, Boley was a dancer. An article in an 1898 issue of a newspaper commented on "the grace with which she accomplished a difficult solo dance". In 1900, she was a member of the Alice Nielsen Opera Company. Her last stage appearance in New York was in the musical Jubilee. As a singer in the musical Hit the Deck (1927), Boley introduced the popular song "Hallelujah".

== Film ==
Boley starred in The Great Pie Mystery (1931) with Harry Gribbon, Alma Bennett, Harry Myers, Dick Stewart, George Gray and Julia Griffith; Hail, the Princess (1930) with Monte Collins and Alma Bennett; Beneath the Law (1929) with Bobby Clark and Paul McCullough; and Richard Carle in The Warrior (1928) with James Sullivan. She also starred in The Women (1939), and Dangerous Curves (1929) as Mrs Spinelli.

Ethan Mordden, in his book Sing for Your Supper: The Broadway Musical in the 1930s, wrote that Boley resembled Elsa Maxwell.

== Personal life ==
On August 2, 1901, in New York City, Boley married Lieutenant Frederick Lindsley Nicholson, a British Army officer from Putney Hill, London, England.

== Death ==
On January 7, 1963, Boley died in Hollywood Presbyterian Hospital following a long illness. She was 81.

== Filmography ==
- Skylark (1941) as Fat Woman in Subway Car
- Kitty Foyle (1940) as Fainting Customer
- Lady with Red Hair (1940) as Mrs. Peabody
- Henry Goes Arizona (1939) as Henry's Landlady
- The Women (1939) as Mud Mask
- Death of a Champion (1939) as Ma Sloane
- Undercover Doctor (1939)
- Persons in Hiding (1939) as Mme. Thompson
- Letter of Introduction (1938) as Mrs. Meggs, the Landlady
- Cowboy from Brooklyn (1938) as Mrs. Krinkenheim
- Prison Farm (1938) as 'Shifty' Sue
- Women Are Like That (1938) as Hotel Maid
- Reckless Living (1938) as Mother Ryan
- Tovarich (1937) as Louise
- Ready, Willing and Able (1937) as Mrs. Beadle
- Without Orders (1936) as Mrs. Maddy Overhose
- The Informer (1935) as Madame Betty
- The Mighty Barnum (1934) as Bearded Lady
- Advice to the Lovelorn (1933) as Miss Lonelyhearts
- The Kiss Before the Mirror (1933) as Busybody in Courtroom
- The Expert (1932) as Mrs. Smallbridge
- A Woman Commands (1932) as Mascha
- The Great Pie Mystery (1931) as Bertha, Homer's Sweetheart
- Fighting Caravans (1931) as Jane
- Going Wild (1930) as May Bunch
- Moby Dick (1930) as Whale Oil Rosie
- Hail the Princess (1930)
- Children of Pleasure (1930) as Fanny Kaye
- Lilies of the Field (1930) as Maizie
- The Dance of Life (1929) as Gussie
- Dangerous Curves (1929) as Ma Spinelli
- The Woman from Hell (1929) as Mother Price
- Beneath the Law (1929)
- The Wagon Show (1928) as The Strong Woman

== Bibliography ==
- Bradley, Edwin M. (27 April 2009). The First Hollywood Sound Shorts, 1926–1931. McFarland Publishing. p. 560. ISBN 9781476606842.
