= The Diplomats (film) =

1929 film

- Directed by: Norman Taurog
- Written by: Arthur Caesar (story, scenario); Bobby Clark (story, scenario); Paul McCullough (story, scenario)
- Produced by: William Fox
- Starring: Bobby Clark; Paul McCullough; Cissy Fitzgerald; Marguerite Churchill
- Distributed by: Fox Film Corporation
- Release date: January 2, 1929
- Running time: 4 reels (65 minutes) or 2 reels, 26 minutes (per silentera and IMDb)
- Country: United States
- Language: English

The Diplomats is a lost 1929 talking film produced and distributed by Fox Film Corporation. It was directed by Norman Taurog and starred the comedy team of Bobby Clark and Paul McCullough.

== Cast ==
- Bobby Clark as Bobby
- Paul McCullough as Paul
- Marguerite Churchill as The Princess
- Cissy Fitzgerald as The Countess
- John St. Polis as The King of Belgravia
- Andrés de Segurola

== See also ==
- 1937 Fox vault fire
