= Strommen (surname) =

Strommen (from the original Strømmen) is a Norwegian surname. It originates from the municipality of Strømmen.

Notable people with this surname:

- Carl Strommen (1939-), American composer and conductor
- Garrett Strommen (1982-), American actor
- Øyvind Strømmen, Norwegian author and journalist
- Paul Strommen, American politician
- Sarah Strommen, (1973-) American politician
- Svein Ove Strømmen (1949-2010), Norwegian businessperson
- Wegger Christian Strømmen (1959-), Norwegian diplomat
