= The Revlon Mirror Theater =

- Also known as: Mirror Theater
- Genre: Drama; Anthology
- Directed by: Daniel Petrie; Richard Irving; Jack Donohue; Robert G. Walker
- Presented by: Robin Chandler
- Country of origin: United States
- Original language: English
- No. of seasons: 2
- No. of episodes: 23

Production
- Producers: Donald Davis; Dorothy Matthews; Rene Williams
- Production locations: New York City, U.S. (season 1); Los Angeles, U.S. (season 2)
- Editors: Michael R. McAdam; Richard C. Currier
- Running time: 25 minutes

Original release
- Network: NBC (season 1); CBS (season 2)
- Release: June 23 – December 12, 1953

The Revlon Mirror Theater (also known as Mirror Theater) is an American anthology drama television series. The series premiered on NBC on June 23, 1953. After its September 1, 1953 broadcast it moved to CBS for the rest of its run, beginning there on September 19. It ran until December 12, 1953. It aired 23 episodes over its two seasons. The series was sponsored by the Revlon Cosmetics Corporation.

== Cast and crew ==
The series was presented by, at that time, Revlon spokeswoman Robin Chandler.

The series was directed by Daniel Petrie, Jack Donohue, and Richard Irving and produced by Donald Davis and his wife Dorothy Matthews and Rene Williams.

=== Guest stars ===
Some guest stars of the series include Angela Lansbury, Ronald Reagan, Eva Marie Saint, Agnes Moorehead, Lee Marvin, Eddie Albert, Joanne Dru, Felicia Montealegre Bernstein, and Dorothy Malone.

== Production notes ==
The series aired twenty-three episodes and aired two seasons. The series aired from June 23–December 12, 1953. Season one aired from June 23 to September 1, 1953, on NBC before being cancelled and picked up for a second season by CBS from September 19 until being cancelled mid-season on December 12, 1953.

It was originally broadcast as a Summer replacement on Tuesday nights for The Milton Berle Show. But then the series was picked up as a regular series by CBS.

The series was filmed live in New York City for its NBC run and then filmed and taped in Los Angeles for its CBS run.

== Broadcast history ==
- Tuesdays from 8–8:30 PM on NBC from June 23 – September 1, 1953.
- Saturdays from 10:30–11 PM on CBS from September 19 – December 12, 1953.

== Episodes ==
Season	Episodes	Season premiere	Season finale
1	11	June 23, 1953	September 1, 1953
2	12	September 19, 1953	December 12, 1953

The following is the list of episodes that aired:

=== Season 1 ===
- The Little Wife - June 23, 1953 - Eddie Albert
- Salt of the Earth - June 30, 1953 - Richard Kiley
- Someone Like You - July 7, 1953
- Don't Wink at Faint - July 14, 1953
- The Enormous Radio - July 21, 1953
- A Reputation - July 28, 1953
- White Night - August 4, 1953
- The Happy Tingle - August 11, 1953
- The Party - August 18, 1953
- One Summer's Rain - August 25, 1953
- The Bottle Party - September 1, 1953

=== Season 2 ===
- Because I Love Him - September 19, 1953 - Joan Crawford
- Heads or Tails - September 26, 1953
- Lullaby - October 3, 1953
- Flight from Home - October 10, 1953
- Equal Justice - October 17, 1953
- The Surprise Party - October 24, 1953
- Dreams Never Lie - October 31, 1953
- Award Performance - November 7, 1953
- Key in the Lock - November 14, 1953
- Summer Dance - November 21, 1953
- Uncle Jack - November 28, 1953 - Jack Haley
- Next Stop Bethlehem - December 5, 1953

(Note: The last episode of the series was a repeat of the season 2 premiere which aired on September 19, 1953. The repeat aired on December 12, 1953.)

== Bibliography ==
- Tim Brooks and Earle Marsh, The Complete Directory to Prime Time Network and Cable TV Shows 1946–Present, Ninth edition (New York: Ballantine Books, 2007) ISBN 978-0-345-49773-4
