= The Gay Nighties =

1933 film

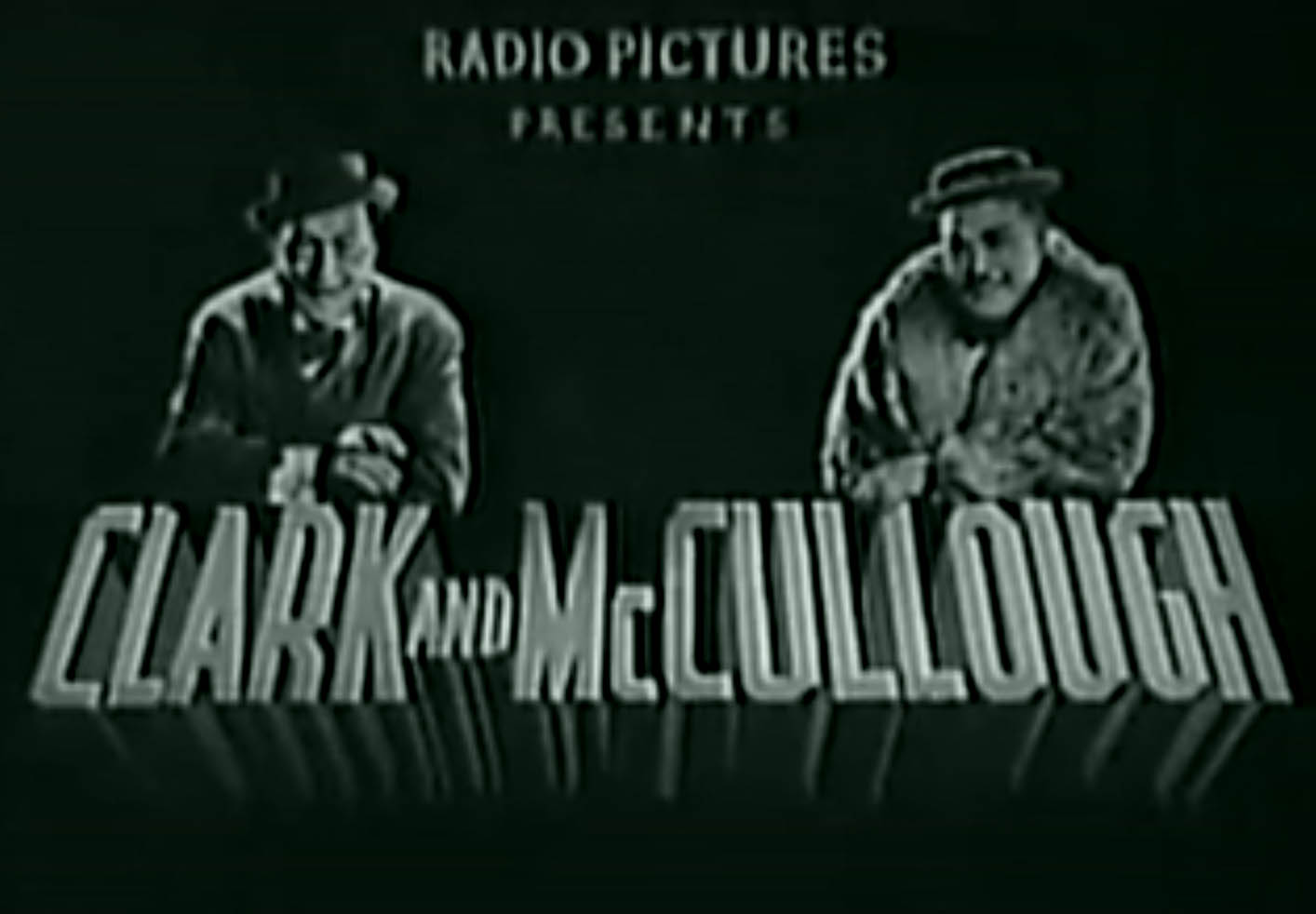
- Bobby Clark & Paul McCullough, in The Gay Nighties (1933)
- Directed by: Mark Sandrich
- Written by: Bobby Clark (adaptation & dialogue); John Grey (story); Ben Holmes (story); Mark Sandrich (adaptation & dialogue)
- Starring: See below
- Cinematography: Nicholas Musuraca
- Edited by: Daniel Mandell
- Distributed by: RKO
- Release date: 1933
- Country: United States
- Language: English

The Gay Nighties is a 1933 American pre-Code comedy film featuring Clark & McCullough and directed by Mark Sandrich.

== Plot summary ==
Clark & McCullough, as Hives and Blodgett, are campaign managers for political candidate Oliver Beezley. They plan to defeat Beezley's political rival, Commodore Amos Pipp (James Finlayson), by exploiting his weakness for women. Blodgett is to be disguised as a beautiful woman to entrap Pipp, but with his moustache he proves unconvincing in drag—Hives declares, "Even the Commodore wouldn't fall for a buzzard like you!"—and Hives instead enlists the help of Mrs. Beezley (Dorothy Granger) to carry out the scheme.

First, though, they have to stay out of the line of fire, and ahead of the police, the nearsighted house detective (Monte Collins), a sleepy man with a cot (Charles Williams), and a somnambulist Countess (Sandra Shaw) with her afghan hound.

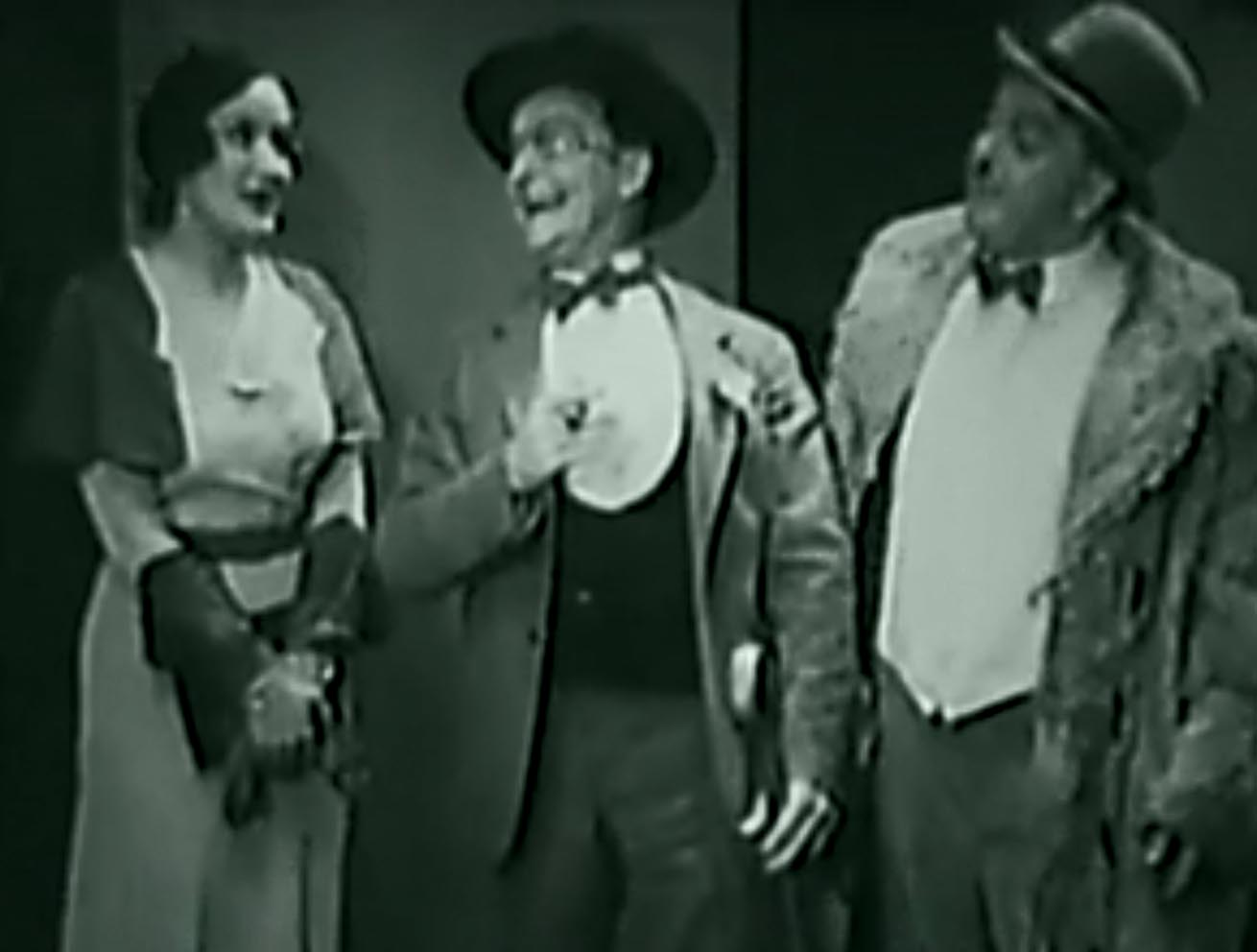
Dorothy Granger, with Clark & McCullough, in The Gay Nighties (1933)

== Cast ==
- Bobby Clark as B. Oglethorpe Hives
- Paul McCullough as Blodgett
- James Finlayson as Mr. Pipp
- Dorothy Granger as Mrs. Beezley
- John Sheehan as Mr. Beezley
- Monte Collins as Hotel Detective
- Sandra Shaw as Countess
- Charles Williams as Sleepy Man
