= Veronica Cooper =

American socialite and actress (1913–2000)

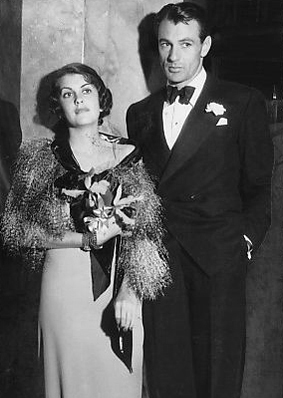
- Veronica and Gary Cooper, 1933
- Born: Veronica Balfe; May 27, 1913; New York City, U.S.
- Died: February 16, 2000 (aged 86); New York City, U.S.
- Other names: Sandra Shaw, Rocky Cooper
- Occupations: Socialite, Actress
- Years active: 1933
- Spouses: Gary Cooper (m. 1933; died 1961) John Converse (m. 1964; died 1981)
- Children: 1
- Relatives: Cedric Gibbons (maternal uncle)

Veronica "Rocky" Cooper (née Balfe; May 27, 1913 – February 16, 2000) was an American socialite and actress who appeared in The Gay Nighties and other films under the name Sandra Shaw. She was the wife of the actor Gary Cooper and mother of painter Maria Cooper Janis.

== Early life ==
Veronica May Balfe was born in Brooklyn to Veronica Gibbons and Harry Balfe, Jr. Following her parents' divorce, she lived in Paris with her mother. Balfe did not see her father for many years, but stayed in contact with her grandfather, who owned a ranch in California. Balfe saw her father a few years before his death in the 1950s. Her mother married Paul Shields, a successful Wall Street financier.

She graduated from the Todhunter School and the Bennett School in Millbrook, New York. While she was in school, she studied dramatics and participated in some amateur productions. An avid sportswoman, she was known to her friends by the nickname "Rocky."

== Career ==
In 1933, she went to see her uncle, Cedric Gibbons, in Hollywood. She received a long-term contract with RKO after a screen test. She played parts in King Kong, Blood Money, and No Other Woman, as well as the sleepwalking countess in the Clark & McCullough comedy short The Gay Nighties (1933). She also played herself in Hedda Hopper's Hollywood No. 3 (1942), and appeared in a few television shows and documentaries.

== Personal life ==
Balfe married actor Gary Cooper on December 15, 1933, at her mother's home at 778 Park Avenue, New York; the wedding had been planned for the Waldorf Astoria hotel, but the location was probably changed to avoid public attention. In 1937, she gave birth to their daughter, Maria Veronica Cooper. They separated in 1951, and reconciled in 1953, remaining married until his death in 1961.

On June 27, 1964, she married plastic surgeon John Marquis Converse in Westport, Connecticut. She was an enthusiastic sportswoman and was the female California skeet champion in the 1930s. She also enjoyed golf, swimming, tennis, and scuba-diving.

She and her daughter were both devout Catholics.

== Death ==
Balfe died in her home in Manhattan on February 16, 2000, aged 86.

== Filmography ==
Year	Film	Role	Notes
1933	No Other Woman		Uncredited
1933	King Kong	Woman looking down, and screaming from hotel room window	Uncredited
1933	The Gay Nighties	The Sleepwalking Countess	
1933	Blood Money	Girl at Racetrack	Uncredited
1942	Hedda Hopper's Hollywood No.3	Herself	
