= Kickin' the Crown Around =

1933 film

- Bobby Clark and Paul McCullough, in Kickin' the Crown Around (1933)
- Directed by: Sam White
- Written by: Blake Burns Kaye (story); Ben Holmes (screenplay)
- Produced by: Lou Brock (supervising producer)
- Starring: See below
- Cinematography: Charles Edgar Schoenbaum
- Edited by: John Lockert
- Release date: 1933
- Running time: 19 minutes
- Country: United States
- Language: English

Kickin' the Crown Around is a 1933 American Pre-Code film featuring the comedy team Clark and McCullough and directed by Sam White.

== Plot ==
In the mythical country of Jugo-Jaggon, the manufacture, sale, or possession of salami is prohibited by law. Despite this, the country is in the grip of a salami addiction crisis. International Agents Blackstone and Blodgett are hired by Nikki, the Prime Minister, to find out who is smuggling 4% garlic salami into the kingdom.

Blackstone and Blodgett accidentally intercept a secret message that reveals that the illegal salami is being delivered to the Wiggle Inn. Posing as waiters, they capture the smuggler Disputin at the inn and attempt to interrogate him, but he refuses to talk even after being squirted with seltzer water. Leaving Disputin tied to a chair, Blackstone and Blodgett report their progress to King Pfui, who is impressed but suggests that a fire hose might be more effective.

Little do any of them suspect that Queen Olga, with her Ladies in Waiting, is the mastermind behind the smuggling ring. When nobody is watching, she unties Disputin and takes his place in the chair.

When King Pfui is led to the captive, he is outraged to find the queen tied up, and threatens to have Blackstone's and Blodgett's heads—but they are saved when the ceiling collapses under the weight of the six tons of salami hidden there. As masses of contraband sausage rain down on the group, Blackstone declares the whole affair "just a lot of baloney".

Leni Stengel with Bobby Clark and Paul McCullough in Kickin' the Crown Around (1933)

== Cast ==
- Bobby Clark as Blackstone - The "Diplomat"
- Paul McCullough as Blodgett
- Ferdinand Munier as King Pfui
- Leni Stengel as The Queen
- Francis McDonald as Disputin
- Eddie Baker as Manager - Wiggle Inn
- Neal Burns as Messenger
- Charles Irwin as Nikki, the Prime Minister
