= Sam White (film producer) =

American film director (1906–2006)

- Born: Samuel Weiss; October 16, 1906; Los Angeles, California, U.S.
- Died: August 5, 2006 (aged 99); Los Angeles, California, U.S.
- Occupation(s): Film producer, film director, actor
- Relatives: Jack White (brother); Jules White (brother); Ben White (brother)

Sam White (born Samuel Weiss; October 16, 1906 – August 8, 2006) was an American film producer, film director and actor.

White was born in Los Angeles on October 16, 1906 to Hungarian-Jewish immigrants. In 1937, he married Claretta Ellis, a studio contract dancer. They were married for 65 years until her death in 2002.

For much of the 1930s, Sam White directed numerous musical sequences in films such as Roberta with Fred Astaire, Ginger Rogers and Irene Dunne; Old Man Rhythm with Betty Grable and Buddy Rogers; Top of the Town with George Murphy; and Hooray for Love, with Ann Sothern.

During World War II, White made six training films for the U.S. Armed Forces. Also in the 1940s, the feature films he produced and directed included Reveille with Beverly, starring Ann Miller (Frank Sinatra's first film); People Are Funny, starring Jack Haley and Rudy Vallée; The Return of the Vampire, starring Bela Lugosi; The Girl in the Case, starring Edmund Lowe; After Midnight with Boston Blackie, starting Chester Morris; Louisiana Hayride, starring Judy Canova; and Tahiti Nights, starring Jinx Falkenburg for RKO, Columbia, Universal and Paramount Studios.

During the next two decades, Sam directed commercials and produced and directed early television series such as Perry Mason, The Outer Limits, Oh! Those Bells, My Friend Flicka, Boston Blackie, Philip Marlowe, and Big Town, among many others. In 1969 he produced and directed White Comanche with William Shatner and Joseph Cotten. He was also a successful businessman with his production facility in Pioneer Town and commercial real estate ventures in Los Angeles.

Throughout his later years, Sam remained interested in world affairs and traveled extensively as a valued ombudsman for the Directors Guild to cement relations between foreign and American filmmakers. In 1990, the Directors Guild of America published an oral history entitled The White Brothers which tells the history of the family as well as the history of early movie making in Los Angeles.

Sam White, one of the famous White Brothers film and television pioneers, died peacefully at his Encino home just short of his 100th birthday. A retrospective was held in 2003 at the Motion Picture and Television Home where a wall of honor was dedicated to him. His professional memorabilia was positioned alongside those of his renowned brothers, Jack White and Jules White.

== Selected filmography ==
- Louisiana Hayride (1944)
- Swing Out the Blues (1944)
- Kickin' the Crown Around (1933)
