= So This Is Harris =

1933 film

- Title card
- Directed by: Mark Sandrich
- Written by: Ben Holmes; Mark Sandrich
- Produced by: Lou Brock
- Starring: Phil Harris; Walter Catlett
- Cinematography: Bert Glennon
- Edited by: John Lockert
- Music by: Will Jason; Val Burton
- Distributed by: RKO Radio Pictures
- Release date: August 13, 1933
- Running time: 28 minutes
- Country: United States
- Language: English

So This Is Harris is a 1933 American pre-Code short comedy film directed by Mark Sandrich. It won an Oscar in 1934 for Best Short Subject (Comedy). The Academy Film Archive preserved So This Is Harris in 2012.

== Plot ==
The film is a series of comical musical numbers and skits following Phil Harris around, starting with him performing at the Cocoanut Grove nightclub, which is listened to by Dorothy on the radio whose homebrewing husband Walter hates Harris. The action then moves to the country club where Walter unknowingly encounters Harris while being aggravated by his music. Walter then pretends to be Phil to meet a woman while Harris "entertains" her friend, Dorothy.

== Cast ==
- Phil Harris as himself
- Walter Catlett as himself
- Helen Collins as Dorothy
- June Brewster as Lillian
- James Finlayson as Golf Pro
