= In Holland =

1929 film

- Directed by: Norman Taurog
- Starring: Bobby Clark
- Production company: Fox Film Corporation
- Release date: 1929
- Country: United States
- Language: English

In Holland is a 1929 American short comedy film.
