= The Wagon Show =

1928 film

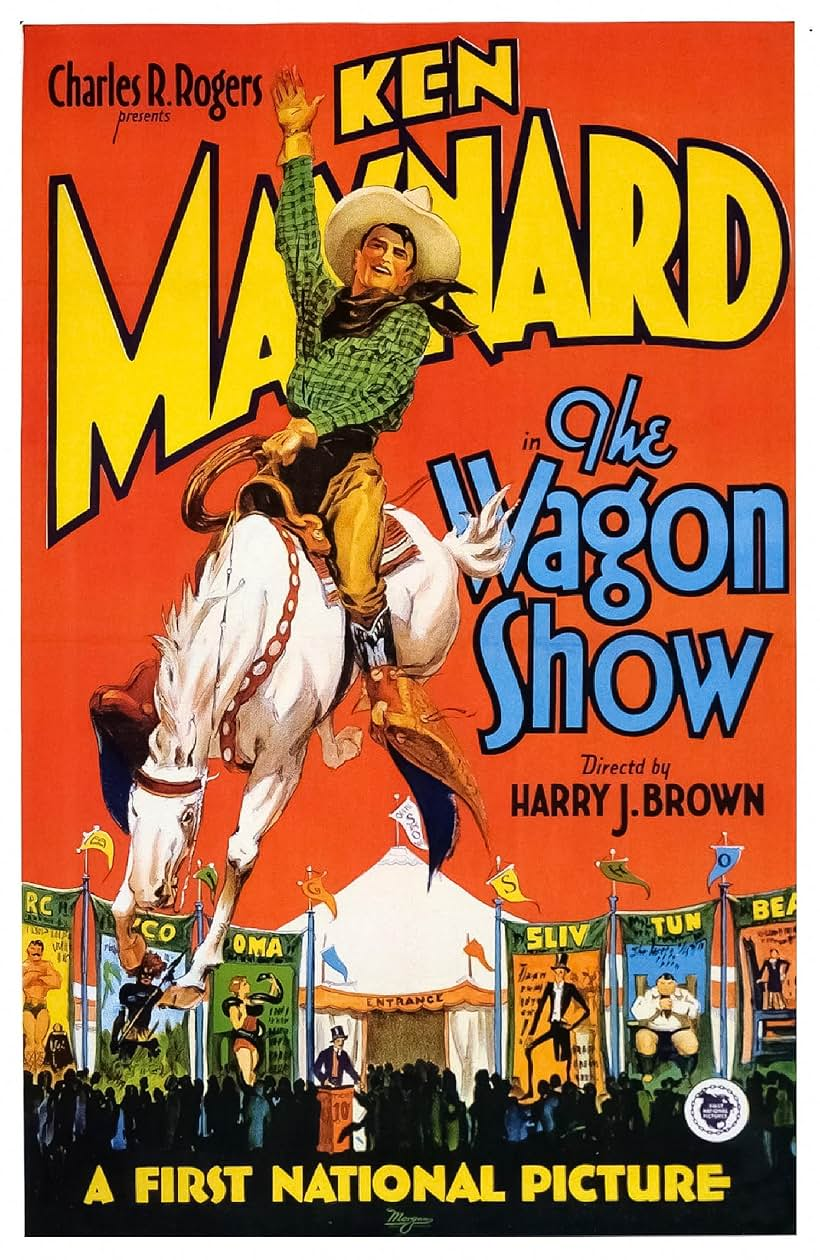
- Theatrical release poster
- Directed by: Harry Joe Brown
- Screenplay by: Ford Beebe; Don Ryan
- Starring: Ken Maynard; Ena Gregory; Maurice Costello; Fred Malatesta; George Davis; May Boley
- Cinematography: Georges Benoît
- Edited by: Fred Allen
- Production company: First National Pictures
- Distributed by: First National Pictures
- Release date: February 19, 1928
- Running time: 60 minutes
- Country: United States
- Languages: Silent; English intertitles

The Wagon Show is a 1928 American silent Western film directed by Harry Joe Brown and written by Ford Beebe and Don Ryan. The film stars Ken Maynard, Ena Gregory, Maurice Costello, Fred Malatesta, George Davis and May Boley. The film was released on February 19, 1928, by First National Pictures.

== Cast ==
- Ken Maynard as Bob Mason
- Ena Gregory as Sally Beldan
- Maurice Costello as Colonel Beldan
- Fred Malatesta as Vicarino
- George Davis as Hank
- May Boley as The Strong Woman
- Paul Weigel as Joey
- Henry Roquemore as The Barker
- Sydney Jarvis as Sayre
- Tarzan as Tarzan
