= Cedric Gibbons =

American art director (1890–1960)

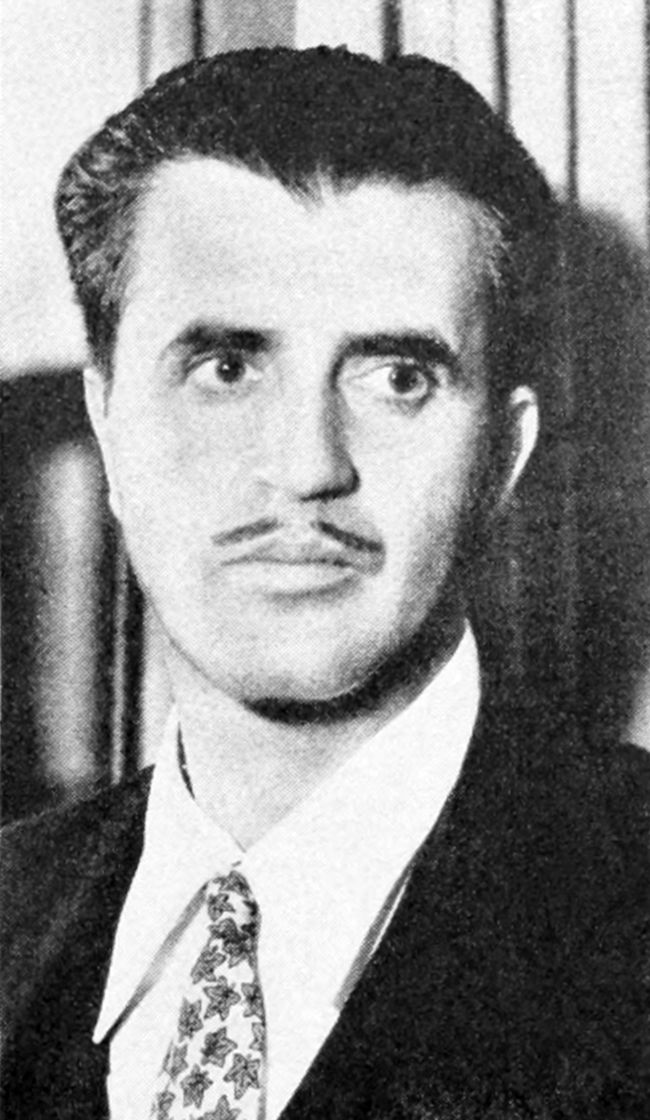
- Gibbons in 1936
- Born: Austin Cedric Gibbons; March 23, 1890; New York City, U.S.
- Died: July 26, 1960 (aged 70); Los Angeles, California, U.S.
- Resting place: Calvary Cemetery, East Los Angeles
- Occupations: Art director; set decorator
- Years active: 1919–1956
- Spouses: Gwendolyn Weller (m. 1926; div. 1926) Dolores del Río (m. 1930; div. 1941) Hazel Brooks (m. 1944)
- Relatives: Veronica Cooper (niece); Billy Gibbons (second cousin once-removed)

Austin Cedric Gibbons (March 23, 1890 – July 26, 1960) was an American art director for the film industry. He also made a significant contribution to motion picture theater architecture from the 1930s to 1950s. Gibbons designed the Oscar statuette in 1928, It is believed to have been inspired by a statue of the Egyptian god Ptah which Gibbons saw in the collection of his friend William Randolph Hearst. He tasked the sculpting to George Stanley, a Los Angeles artist. He was nominated 39 times for the Academy Award for Best Production Design and won the Oscar 11 times, both of which are records.

== Early life ==
Cedric Gibbons was born in New York City in 1890 to Irish architect Austin P. Gibbons and American Veronica Fitzpatrick Simmons. The family moved to Manhattan after the birth of their third child. Cedric studied at the Art Students League of New York in 1911. He began working in his father's office as a junior draftsman, then in the art department at Edison Studios under Hugo Ballin in New Jersey in 1915. He was drafted and served in the US Navy Reserves during World War I at Pelham Bay in New York.

== Career ==
In 1918, Gibbons joined Goldwyn Studios, first serving as an assistant to Hugo Ballin. In 1924, Goldwyn Studios merged with Metro Pictures and Louis B. Mayer Pictures to become Metro-Goldwyn-Mayer (MGM). In 1925, working in MGM's art department, Gibbons competed with Romain De Tirtoff for a more substantial position, while working with Joseph Wright, Merrill Pye and Richard Day on some 20 films. Tirtoff is better known as Erte. When studio executive Irving Thalberg summoned Gibbons to work on Ben Hur (1925), he used knowledge of the up-and-coming art moderne (that was to become known as art deco) to advance in the department. In addition to his credits as set decorator and art director, Cedric Gibbons is credited for directing one feature film, Tarzan and His Mate (1934).

Gibbons was one of the original 36 founding members of the Academy of Motion Picture Arts and Sciences and designed the Academy Awards statuette in 1928. He was nominated 39 times for Best Art Direction, and won 11. His eleventh win was for Somebody Up There Likes Me (1956).

Gibbons retired from MGM as art director and the head of the art department on April 26, 1956, due to ill health with over 2,000 films credited to him. He was succeeded by William A. Horning. Even so, his actual hands-on art direction is considerable and his contributions lasting.

== Personal life and death ==
Gibbons married Gwendolyn Weller in New York City on January 16, 1926, after having known her for one week. (On the marriage certificate, it is stated that he had been born in Dublin, Ireland.) They divorced shortly thereafter on the grounds of "desertion." Gibbons at first failed to pay the promised $6,000 per year alimony.

On August 6, 1930, Gibbons married actress Dolores del Río. He co-designed their house with Douglas Honnold in Santa Monica, an intricate Art Deco residence influenced by Rudolf Schindler. The couple divorced in 1941. In October 1944, he married actress Hazel Brooks, with whom he remained until his death.

Gibbons' niece Veronica "Rocky" Balfe was Gary Cooper's wife and briefly an actress known as Sandra Shaw.

Gibbons' second cousin Frederick "Royal" Gibbons—a musician, orchestra conductor, and entertainer who worked with him at MGM—was the father of Billy Gibbons of the rock band ZZ Top.

Despite holding a US birth certificate, Gibbons claimed on census forms that he was born in Ireland and that his family emigrated to the US during his early childhood. His press marriage announcement also stated that he was a native of Ireland.

Gibbons died in Los Angeles on July 26, 1960, after a long illness at age 70. Contemporary publications, including the Los Angeles Times, reported at the time that he had died at age 65. He was interred under a modest marker at the Calvary Cemetery, East Los Angeles.

== Legacy ==
Gibbons' set designs, particularly those in such films as Born to Dance (1936) and Rosalie (1937), heavily inspired motion picture theater architecture in the late 1930s through 1950s.

Among the classic examples are the Loma Theater in San Diego, the Crest theaters in Long Beach, California and Fresno, California, and the Culver Theater in Culver City, California, some of which are still extant. The style sometimes is referred to as Art Deco or as Art Moderne. The style is found in the theaters that were managed by the Skouras brothers, whose designer Carl G. Moeller used the sweeping scroll-like details in his creations.

The iconic Oscar statuettes that Gibbons designed, which were first awarded in 1929, still are being presented to winners at Academy Awards ceremonies each year.

Gibbons was inducted into the Art Directors Guild Hall of Fame in February 2005.

== Academy Awards ==
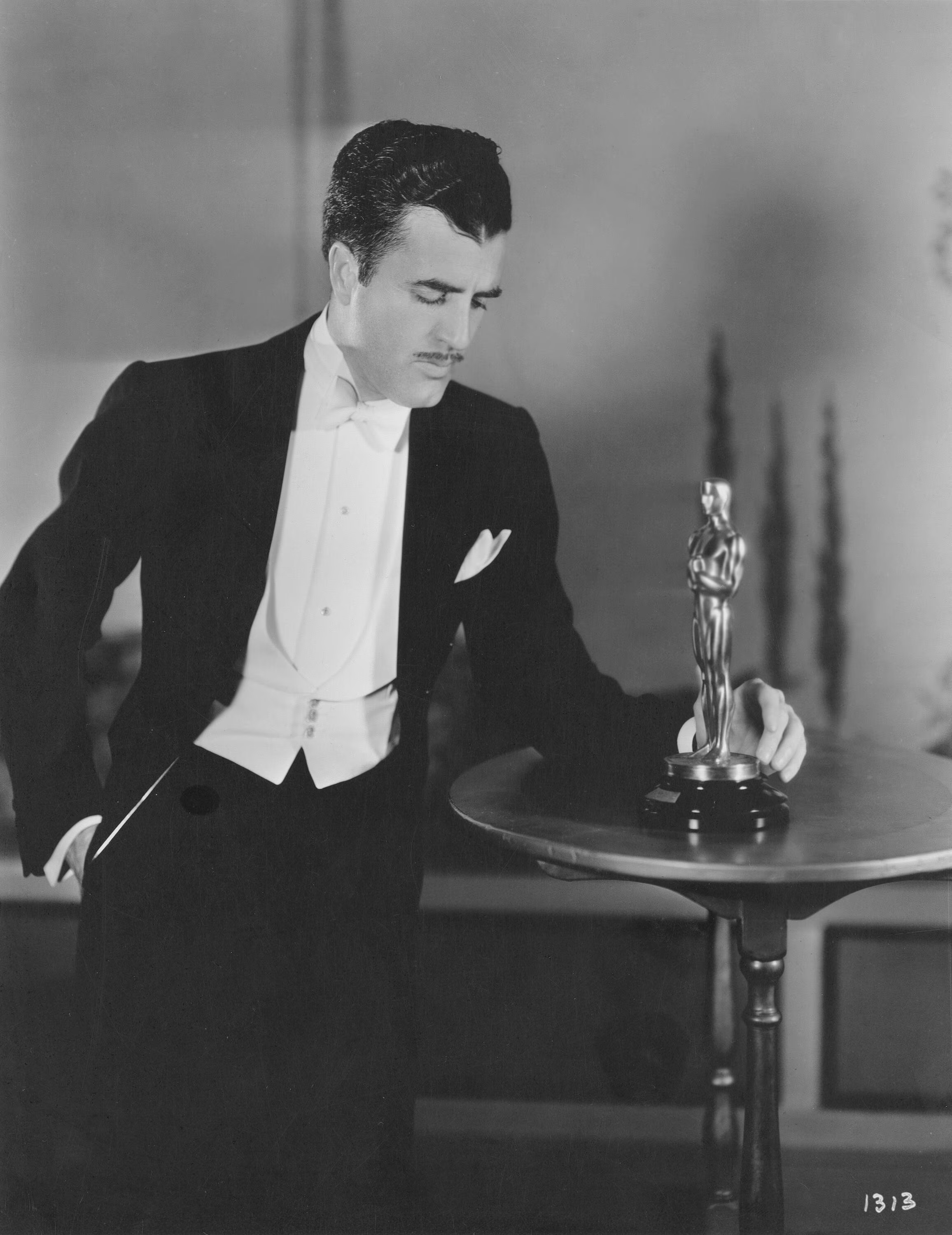
Gibbons holding his first Academy Award for Best Art Direction, winning for The Bridge of San Luis Rey (1929). Gibbons designed the Oscar statuette that's still in use each year.

=== Awards for Art Direction ===
- The Bridge of San Luis Rey (1929)
- The Merry Widow (1934)
- Pride and Prejudice (1940)
- Blossoms in the Dust (1941)
- Gaslight (1944)
- The Yearling (1946)
- Little Women (1949)
- An American in Paris (1951)
- The Bad and the Beautiful (1952)
- Julius Caesar (1953)
- Somebody Up There Likes Me (1956)

=== Nominations for Art Direction ===
- When Ladies Meet (1933)
- Romeo and Juliet (1936)
- The Great Ziegfeld (1936)
- Conquest (1937)
- Marie Antoinette (1938)
- The Wizard of Oz (1939)
- Bitter Sweet (1940)
- When Ladies Meet (1941)
- Random Harvest (1942)
- Madame Curie (1943)
- Thousands Cheer (1943)
- Kismet (1944)
- National Velvet (1944)
- The Picture of Dorian Gray (1945)
- Madame Bovary (1949)
- The Red Danube (1949)
- Annie Get Your Gun (1950)
- Too Young to Kiss (1951)
- Quo Vadis (1951)
- The Merry Widow (1952)
- Lili (1953)
- The Story of Three Loves (1953)
- Young Bess (1953)
- Brigadoon (1954)
- Executive Suite (1954)
- I'll Cry Tomorrow (1955)
- Blackboard Jungle (1955)
- Lust for Life (1956)

== See also ==
- Art Directors Guild Hall of Fame

== Works cited ==
- Gutner, Howard (2019). MGM Style: Cedric Gibbons and the Art of the Golden Age of Hollywood. Lanham, Maryland: Rowman & Littlefield. ISBN 978-1-4930-3858-9.
