= Prison Farm (film) =

1938 film by Louis King

- Theatrical release poster
- Directed by: Louis King
- Screenplay by: Eddie Welch; Robert Yost; Stuart Anthony
- Story by: Edwin V. Westrate
- Produced by: William LeBaron
- Starring: Shirley Ross; Lloyd Nolan; John Howard; J. Carrol Naish; Porter Hall; Esther Dale; May Boley
- Cinematography: Harry Fischbeck
- Edited by: Edward Dmytryk
- Production company: Paramount Pictures
- Distributed by: Paramount Pictures
- Release date: June 17, 1938
- Running time: 67 minutes
- Country: United States
- Language: English

Prison Farm is a 1938 American crime film directed by Louis King, and written by Eddie Welch, Robert Yost, and Stuart Anthony. It stars Shirley Ross, Lloyd Nolan, John Howard, J. Carrol Naish, Porter Hall, Esther Dale, May Boley, and William Holden in his film debut. The film was released on June 17, 1938.

== Plot ==
Jean Forest gets in a relationship with criminal Larry Harrison, even though she is advised not to, he wants to elope to Canada and Jean gives up her job to go with him. On the way they are arrested for a small crime and Harrison pleads guilty in hope of going to a local farm prison, but it turns out to be a brutal penal colony.

== Cast ==
- Shirley Ross as Jean Forest
- Lloyd Nolan as Larry Harrison
- John Howard as Dr. Roi Conrad
- J. Carrol Naish as Noel Haskins
- Porter Hall as Chiston R. Bradby
- Esther Dale as Cora Waxley
- May Boley as "Shifty" Sue
- Marjorie Main as Matron Brand
- Anna Q. Nilsson as Matron Ames
- John Hart as "Texas" Jack
- William Holden as Prisoner (uncredited)
