= Scratch-As-Catch-Can =

1932 film

- Directed by: Mark Sandrich
- Written by: Bobby Clark; William Grew; John Grey; Mark Sandrich
- Produced by: Lou Brock
- Starring: Bobby Clark; Paul McCullough
- Edited by: Ted Cheesman
- Distributed by: RKO Pictures
- Release date: November 6, 1932
- Running time: 19 minutes
- Country: United States
- Language: English

Scratch-As-Catch-Can is a 1932 American short comedy film directed by Mark Sandrich. It was nominated for an Academy Award at the 5th Academy Awards for Best Short Subject (Comedy).

This was a replacement for the originally nominated short Stout Hearts and Willing Hands, which was disqualified, for unknown reasons.

== Cast ==
- Bobby Clark
- Paul McCullough
- James Finlayson
- Walter Brennan
- Robert Graves (as Robert Graves Jr.)
- Charlie Hall
- Vince Barnett
