= His Lucky Day =

1929 film

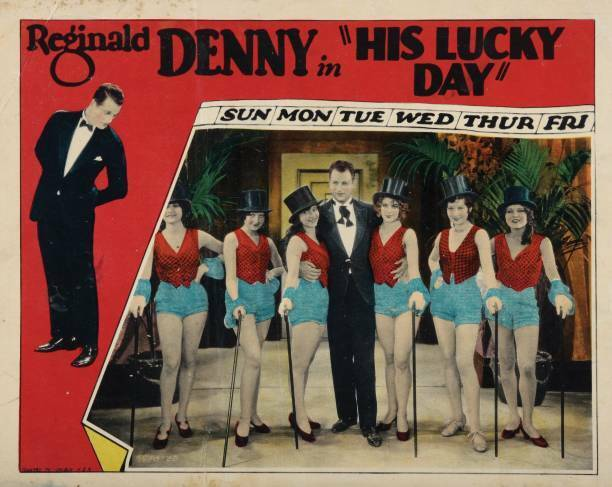
- Directed by: Edward F. Cline
- Screenplay by: John B. Hymer; Gladys Lehman; Albert DeMond
- Story by: John B. Hymer; Gladys Lehman
- Starring: Reginald Denny; Lorayne Duval; Otis Harlan; Eddie Phillips; Cissy Fitzgerald; Harvey Clark
- Cinematography: Arthur L. Todd
- Edited by: Ted J. Kent; Harry Marker
- Production company: Universal Pictures
- Distributed by: Universal Pictures
- Release date: June 2, 1929
- Running time: 59 minutes
- Country: United States
- Languages: Sound (Part-Talkie); English Intertitles

His Lucky Day is a 1929 American sound part-talkie comedy film directed by Edward F. Cline and written by John B. Hymer, Gladys Lehman and Albert DeMond. In addition to sequences with audible dialogue or talking sequences, the film features a synchronized musical score and sound effects along with English intertitles. The soundtrack was recorded using the Western Electric sound-on-film system. The film stars Reginald Denny, Lorayne Duval, Otis Harlan, Eddie Phillips, Cissy Fitzgerald and Harvey Clark. The film was released on June 2, 1929, by Universal Pictures.

== Cast ==
- Reginald Denny as Charles Blaydon
- Lorayne Duval as Kay Weaver
- Otis Harlan as Jerome Van Dyne
- Eddie Phillips as Spider
- Cissy Fitzgerald as Mrs. Dan Dyne
- Harvey Clark as Jerome Weaver
- Tom O'Brien as James

== See also ==
- List of early sound feature films (1926–1929)
