= A Preferred List =

1933 film

- Directed by: Leigh Jason
- Produced by: Lou Brock
- Starring: Ken Murray; Dorothy Lee
- Distributed by: Columbia Pictures
- Release date: 1933
- Running time: 20 minutes
- Country: United States
- Language: English

A Preferred List is a 1933 American Pre-Code short comedy film produced by Lou Brock. At the 6th Academy Awards, held in 1933, it was nominated for an Academy Award for Best Short Subject (Comedy).

== Cast ==
- Ken Murray
- Dorothy Lee
