= Rough Romance =

1930 film

- Film poster
- Directed by: A. F. Erickson
- Written by: Kenneth B. Clarke (story); Donald Davis (dialogue)
- Produced by: William Fox
- Starring: George O'Brien; Helen Chandler
- Cinematography: Daniel B. Clark
- Edited by: Paul Weatherwax
- Music by: Johnny Burke; George A. Little
- Distributed by: Fox Film Corporation
- Release date: June 22, 1930 (UK)
- Running time: 55 minutes
- Country: United States
- Language: English

Rough Romance is a 1930 American lumberjack Western film directed by A. F. Erickson. The film stars George O'Brien, Helen Chandler, Antonio Moreno, Roy Stewart, and Harry Cording and a 23-year-old John Wayne had a minor uncredited role.

== Cast ==
- George O'Brien as Billy West
- Helen Chandler as Marna Reynolds
- Antonio Moreno as Loup La Tour
- Roy Stewart as Sheriff Milt Powers
- Harry Cording as Chick Carson
- David Hartford as "Dad" Reynolds
- Noel Francis as Flossie
- Frank Lanning as Pop Nichols
- John Wayne as Lumberjack (uncredited)

While Wayne had a small part in this film and also worked on props, he was not given a props credit, as some sources show. If he had been, he would have been the first and only props worker given an on-film credit in 1930.

== See also ==
- John Wayne filmography
