= The Medicine Men (film) =

1929 film

- Directed by: Norman Taurog
- Starring: Bobby Clark
- Production company: Fox Film
- Release date: 1929
- Running time: 25 minutes
- Country: United States
- Language: English

The Medicine Men is a 1929 American short Pre-Code comedy film directed by Norman Taurog.
