= Dangerous Curves (1929 film) =

1929 film by Lothar Mendes

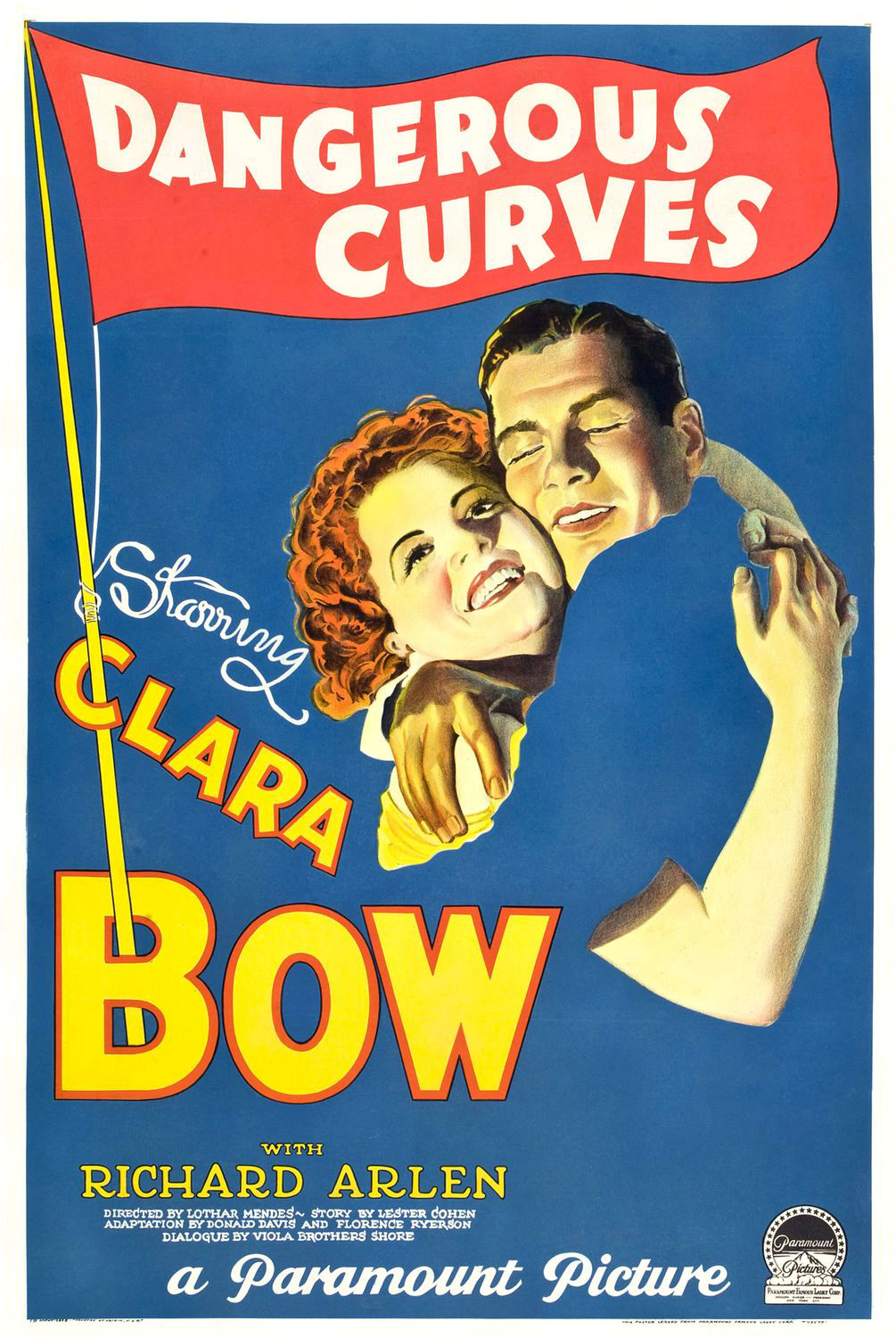
- Theatrical release poster
- Directed by: Lothar Mendes
- Written by: Florence Ryerson; Donald Davis; Viola Brothers Shore
- Story by: Lester Cohen
- Starring: Clara Bow; Richard Arlen; Kay Francis
- Cinematography: Harry Fischbeck
- Edited by: Eda Warren
- Distributed by: Paramount Pictures
- Release date: July 13, 1929
- Running time: 75 minutes
- Country: United States
- Language: English

Dangerous Curves is a 1929 American pre-Code drama film directed by Lothar Mendes and starring Clara Bow and Richard Arlen. It was released by Paramount Pictures and was the first Hollywood film for Kay Francis. The film entered the public domain on January 1, 2025. (Note: Under R174906)

== Plot ==
Dangerous Curves (1929)

Pat Delaney is working in a circus as one of the female bareback riders. She is in love with Larry Lee, an arrogant trapeze artist and the circus's biggest act. He does not seem to notice her, though, as he is used to being adored by tons of women. He is in a relationship with Zara, a manipulative vamp.

Larry's boss warns him about Zara, explaining that he has been incurring a lot of debts since he began dating her and that his act is no longer as powerful as in the past. One day, Pat and Larry get acquainted, and she intimates that she has feelings about him and that they should do an act together. Although he makes clear that his heart belongs to someone else, he convinces the circus manager to give Pat a try on the wire.

Later that day, Pat catches Zara having a date with another man, Tony. When she tells Larry about the affair, he madly confronts Zara and threatens to beat up Tony. He is interrupted by the notion that he has to perform, but he is unable to concentrate and falls off the tight-rope. He is taken to the hospital and soon recovers, but then goes missing from the circus. He refuses to come back and spends his time getting drunk instead. When he finds out that Zara and Tony have left the circus and are now struggling to get work, he sympathizes with them. Upon finding out that he is not planning on returning to the circus, Pat is determined to convince him to do otherwise. Together they form an act, but it soon becomes clear that Larry has lost his talent.

Pat has trouble breaking through his distant behavior, but she convinces him to teach her how to walk a tight-rope. During this progress, he finds his talent again and urges Zara to come back to work on the greatest tight-rope act in history. When Pat finds out, she feels used and confronts Larry with an outburst before leaving in tears. The circus manager tries to comfort her and offers her her own wire act. Meanwhile, Larry is left behind by Zara, who turns out to have married Tony. On the night of her premiere, a drunken Larry tells Pat about his failure. As she tries to comfort him, she misses her premiere and is fired. Larry has collapsed in the meanwhile and Pat decides to pose as him on stage. When Larry awakens, he shows his gratitude and kisses her.

== Cast ==
- Clara Bow as Patricia Delaney, a circus bareback rider
- Richard Arlen Larry Lee, a tight-rope walker
- Kay Francis as Zara Flynn, Larry's partner
- David Newell as Tony Barretti, another circus performer
- Anders Randolf as Colonel P.P. Brack
- May Boley as Ma Spinelli
- T. Roy Barnes as Po Spinelli
- Joyce Compton as Jennie Silver
- Stuart Erwin as Rotarian

== See also ==
- List of early sound feature films (1926–1929)
