= Cissy Fitzgerald =

American actress and singer (1873–1941)

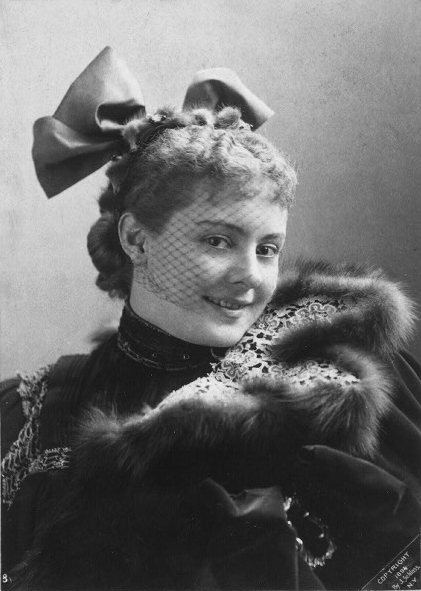
- Fitzgerald in 1894
- Born: Mary Kate Kipping; 1 February 1873; England, UK
- Died: 10 May 1941 (aged 68); Ovingdean, Sussex, England, UK
- Other name: "The Girl with the Wink"
- Occupation: Actress
- Years active: 1890s–1937
- Spouse: Oliver Mark Tucker
- Children: Oliver Mark Fitzgerald(son); Julia

Cissy Fitzgerald (born Mary Kate Kipping; 1 February 1873 – 10 May 1941) was an English-American vaudeville actress, dancer, and singer who appeared in numerous silent and sound films. Fitzgerald acted in a popular Gaiety Girl show beginning in 1894 and was filmed in the role in 1896 in a self-titled short film shot by Thomas Edison's film company. She did not appear in films again until 1914 where she signed with the Vitagraph company and was quite popular in feature films and her own series of Cissy short films. Very little of Fitzgerald's silent material survives except her comic backup role in the 1928 Lon Chaney vehicle Laugh, Clown, Laugh.

Fitzgerald claimed to have been the first woman in motion pictures, on 50 feet of film at the Edison labs in New Jersey in 1896. However, Annabelle Whitford had been filmed in 1894 by Edison engineer W. K. L. Dickson and the Lumières in France were shooting motion pictures, including men and women coming and going from a factory, by 1896.

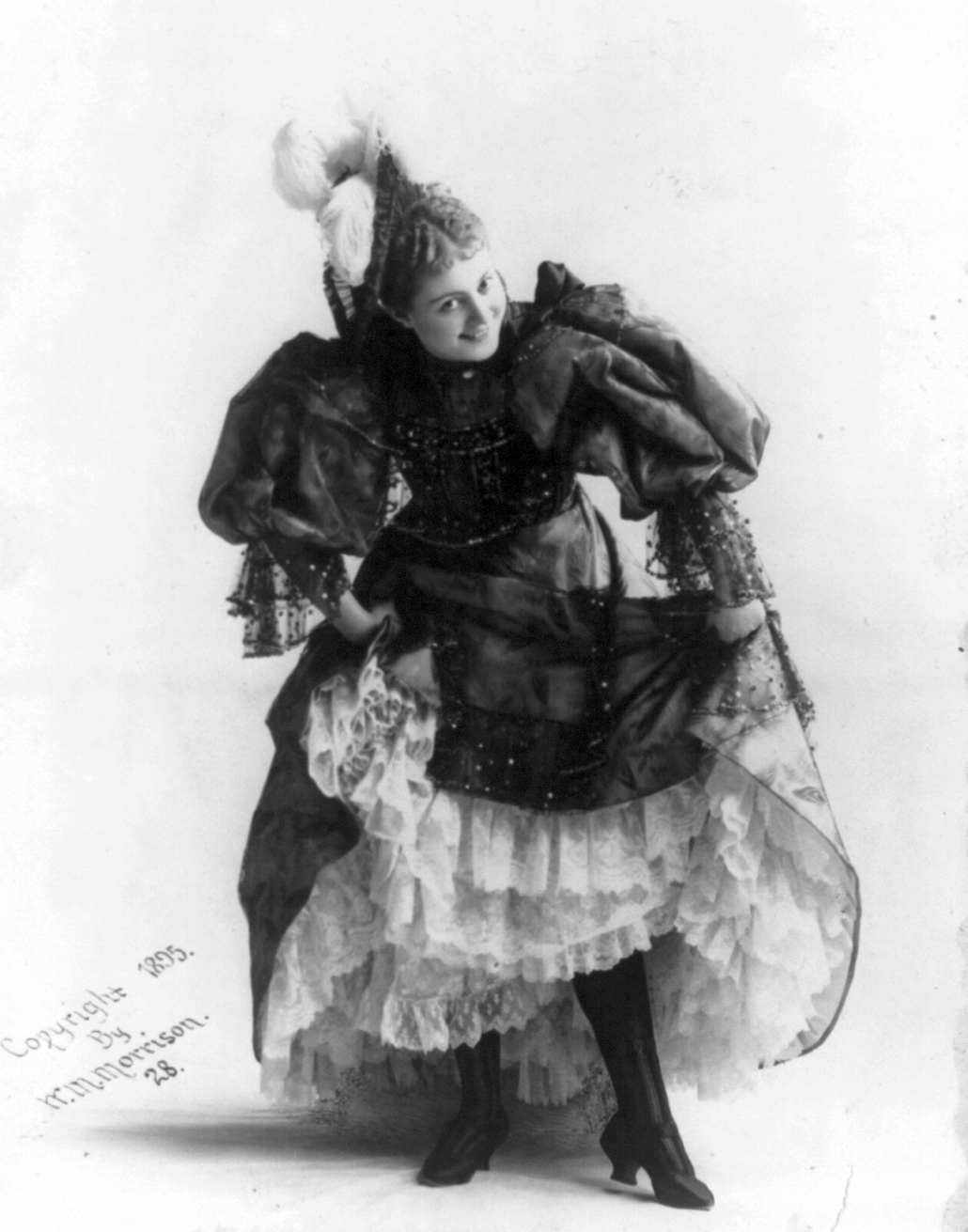
Photo by William McKenzie Morrison, 1895

Fitzgerald married Oliver Mark Tucker and had two children, a son and a daughter.

== Fitzgerald's Wink ==
Fitzgerald had an involuntary left-eye "wink", caused by tension in her orbicularis oculi muscle. While this wink became her trademark in the industry, it was controversial, uncomfortable and affected her health. The involuntary "wink" was actually a twitch, and outside of the studio it was sometimes taken as promiscuous. Fitzgerald's wink came to serve a greater purpose in the feminist film industry. Its widespread expression in her work helped researchers to understand Fitzgerald's disorder. Her wink provided an example for feminist historians, filmmakers, and producers investigating and identifying the gender contradictions of the early film industry. The constant repetitive image of Cissy's wink in her performance caused the stage comedian involuntarily to imbrute her own gestures.

== Career ==
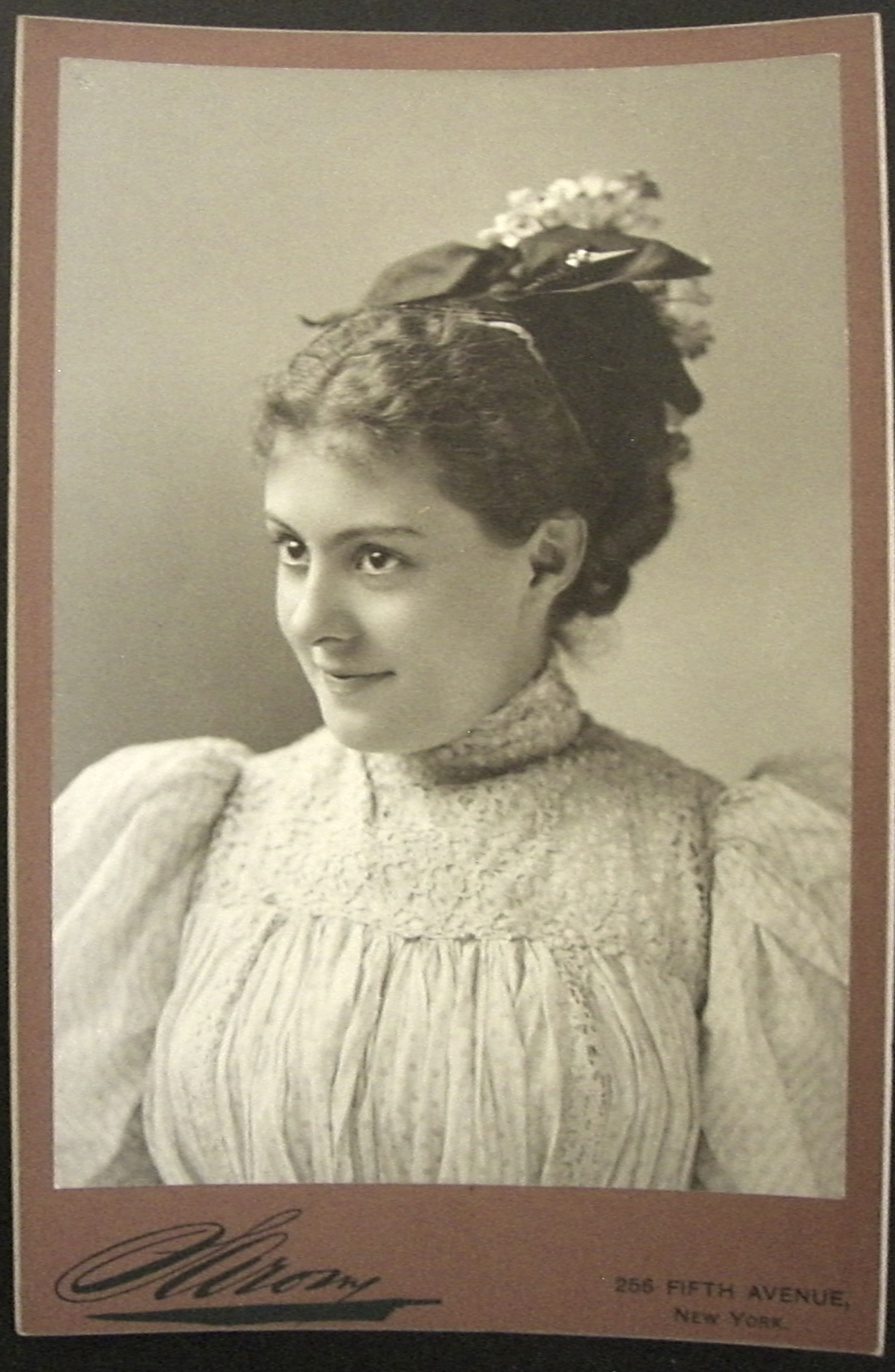
Cissy Fitzgerald photo portrait by Otto Sarony, New York

After her film short for Edison in 1896, Fitzgerald did not return to motion pictures until 1914, at the very end of the often raunchy nickelodeon years of film. Fitzgerald appeared in about twenty films between 1914 and 1916. In most of these films she portrayed a comedic character, but occasionally displayed a different facet of her talents, for example, her performance in The Esterbrook Case, a melodrama with a subtle hint of mystery.

Fitzgerald took a hiatus from acting to marry Oliver Mark Tucker in Great Britain and then travel the world in celebration. Cissy and her new husband visited India, Africa, Australia, and China before the start of World War I. Fitzgerald returned to the United States to relaunch her film career. Her break from films lasted from 1916 until the beginning of 1921. Later in 1921, Cissy featured in five comedies produced by her own small company "Cissy Fitzgerald Productions", on the west coast of America.

Fitzgerald is credited as the first female producer of films. The films she starred in under "Cissy Fitzgerald Productions" were marketed as "refined comedies", and included Cissy's Saucy Stockings, Seeing America Thirst, Cissy Invades Bohemia, Cissy's Economy, and Comes Back Cissy. Cissy.

Fitzgerald reinvented herself yet again as a feature film actress in the 1920s and the 1930s. She appeared in many silent and sound films in a plethora of genres, many of which still exist. The best known of her feature film parts is Giancinta in Laugh, Clown, Laugh from 1928, a Lon Chaney film about a circus clown who cannot seem to cheer up, that befriends an Italian count who experienced bouts of uncontrollable laughter. Because Fitzgerald as Giancinta is a minor character, it is speculated that the history of Fitzgerald's uncontrollable winking limited the importance of her role in Laugh, Clown, Laugh. Cissy Fitzgerald was signed with several film companies during her career as an actress, including Kleine Studios, Vitagraph, Casino Studios, and Broadway Star Studios.

== Selected filmography ==
- Cissy Fitzgerald – (50 feet of actuality film of Fitzgerald by Edison as a Gaiety Girl (1896) *short
- Mary Jane (1913) *short
- Curing Cissy (1915) *short
- Cissy's Innocent Wink (1915) *short
- Leave It to Cissy (1916) *short
- Cissy's Funnymoon (1919) *short [title not in IMDb inventory]
- Cissy's Saucy Stockings (1921) *short
- Seeing America Thirst (1921) *short
- Cissy Invades Bohemia (1921) *short
- Cissy's Economy (1921) *short
- Cissy's Financial Flivver (1921) *short
- Lilies of the Field (1924)
- Cornered (1924)
- Flowing Gold (1924)
- Vanity's Price (1924)
- Daring Love (1924)
- Babbitt (1924)
- If Marriage Fails (1925)
- I'll Show You the Town (1925)
- Redheads Preferred (1926)
- The High Flyer (1926)
- The Crown of Lies (1926)
- Flames (1926)
- The Danger Girl (1926)
- Her Big Night (1926)
- McFadden's Flats (1927)
- Fire and Steel (1927)
- Women Love Diamonds (1927)
- Two Flaming Youths (1927)
- The Beauty Shoppers (1927)
- Laugh, Clown, Laugh (1928)
- No Babies Wanted (1928)
- Ladies of the Night Club (1928)
- The Diplomats (1929)
- The Painted Angel (1929)
- His Lucky Day (1929)
- The Masquerader (1933)
- Flirtation (1934)
- Strictly Illegal (1935)
