= Two Flaming Youths =

1927 film by John Waters

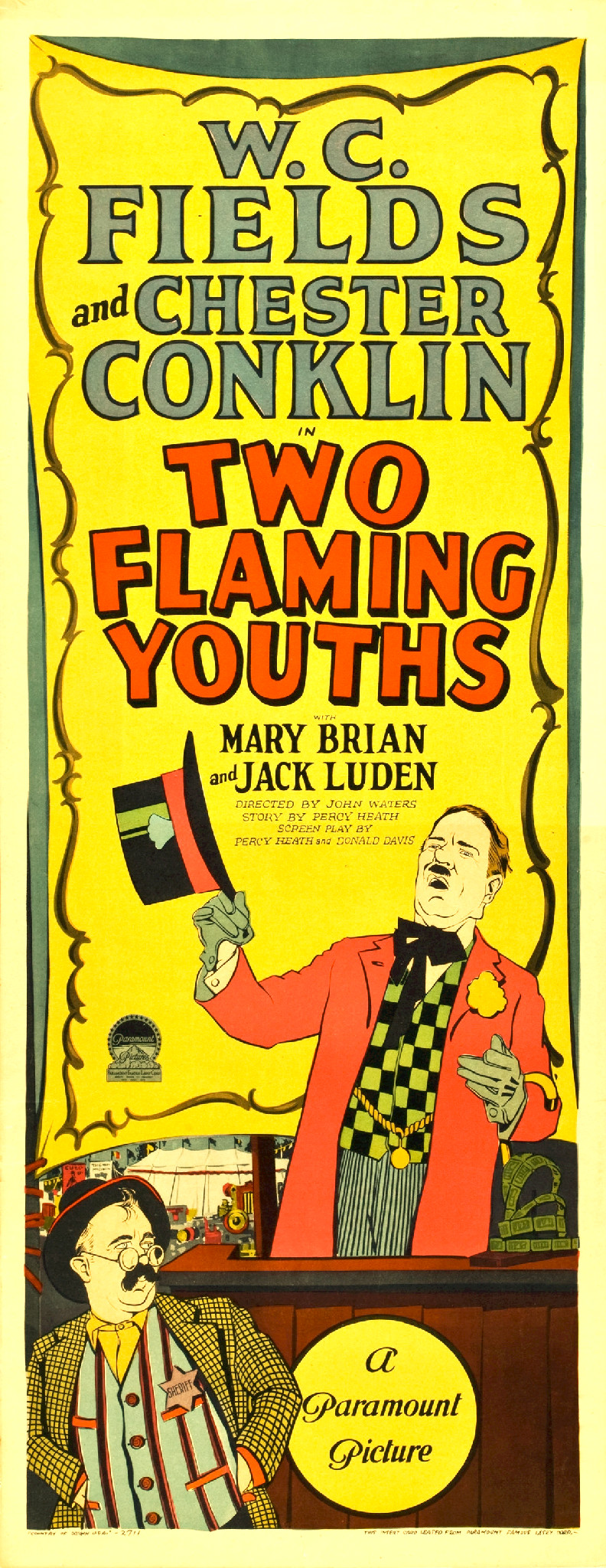
- Film poster
- Directed by: John Waters
- Screenplay by: John W. Conway; Donald Davis; Percy Heath; Herman J. Mankiewicz
- Produced by: John Waters; Jesse L. Lasky; Adolph Zukor
- Starring: W. C. Fields; Chester Conklin; Mary Brian; Jack Luden; George Irving; Cissy Fitzgerald
- Cinematography: H. Kinley Martin
- Edited by: Rose Loewinger
- Production company: Famous Players–Lasky Corporation
- Distributed by: Paramount Pictures
- Release date: December 17, 1927
- Running time: 55 minutes
- Country: United States
- Language: Silent (English intertitles)

Two Flaming Youths is a lost 1927 American silent comedy film directed by John Waters and written by John W. Conway, Donald Davis, Percy Heath, and Herman J. Mankiewicz.

Two Flaming Youths stars W. C. Fields, Chester Conklin, Mary Brian, Jack Luden, George Irving, and Cissy Fitzgerald. The film was released on December 17, 1927, by Paramount Pictures.

== Plot ==
In a small American town, Sheriff Ben Holden is in love with hotel owner Madge Malarkey. Madge is in trouble because she owes a lot of money to the wealthy Simeon Trott. Meanwhile, Holden is trying to capture Slippery Sawtelle, a scam artist that he has never met.

One day, the carnival man Gabby Gilfoil comes to town. Because Gilfoil has been defaulting on some debts, Holden has taken notice of him. The sheriff starts thinking that Gilfoil is actually the criminal Sawtell. Both Gilfoil and Sawtell fall in love with Madge and decide to scam Trott to help her. They cheat Trott out of money and give it to Madge to pay off her debt. However, she is not interested in either man. At the end of the film, Holden finally apprehends the real Sawtelle.

== Cast ==
- W. C. Fields as Gabby Gilfoil
- Chester Conklin as Sheriff Ben Holden
- Mary Brian as Mary Gilfoil
- Jack Luden as Tony Holden
- George Irving as Simeon Trott
- Cissy Fitzgerald as Madge Malarkey
- James Quinn as Slippery Sawtelle (credited as Jimmy Quinn)
- Ben Bard as Bard (as Pearl and Bard)
- Jay Brennan as Brennan (as Savoy and Brennan)
- Bobby Clark as Clark (as Clark & McCullough)
- Max Dill as Dill (of Kolb and Dill)
- Vivian Duncan as Vivian Duncan
- Lew Fields as Fields (as Weber and Fields)
- Clarence Kolb as Kolb (as Kolb and Dill) (credited as C. William Kolb)
- Charles Mack as Mack as part of Moran and Mack (Two Black Crows)
- Chester Morton as the Human Pin Cushion
- Lee W. Parker as The Tattooed Man
- Jack Pearl as Pearl (as Pearl and Bard)
- Billy Platt as The Dwarf (as William Platt)
- Stanley Rogers as Savoy (as Savoy & Brennan)
- John Seresheff as the Strong Man
- Joe Weber as Weber (as Weber and Fields)
- John Aasen as the Giant (uncredited)
- Wallace Beery as Beery - of Beery and Hatton (uncredited)
- Rosetta Duncan as Rosetta Duncam (uncredited)
- Raymond Hatton as Hatton - of Beery and Hatton (uncredited)
- Monty O'Grady as minor role (uncredited)
