= Alibi Bye Bye =

- Publicity still of Clark & McCullough
- Directed by: Ben Holmes
- Written by: Joseph Fields; John Grey; Bobby Clark
- Produced by: Lee S. Marcus
- Starring: Bobby Clark; Paul McCullough; Bud Jamison; Dorothy Granger; Tom Kennedy
- Cinematography: J. Roy Hunt
- Edited by: Edward Mann
- Distributed by: RKO Radio Pictures
- Release date: June 14, 1935
- Running time: 18 minutes
- Country: United States
- Language: English

Alibi Bye Bye is a 1935 comedy short directed by Ben Holmes and released by RKO Radio Pictures. It is notable as the final film appearance of the comedy team of Bobby Clark and Paul McCullough.

== Plot ==
Clark and McCullough are Flash and Blodgett, a pair of "alibi photographers" operating a studio in Atlantic City, New Jersey. The pair cater to a clientele who require fraudulent tourist photographs using fake backdrops, which can later be used as evidence that the person in the photograph was at any location in the country. One day, a married couple (Bud Jamison and Constance Bergen) turn up separately in need of alibi photographs: the man wants evidence of being on a Maine moose hunt while the woman needs photographic proof of being in Washington, D.C. The photographers, unaware that the man and woman are married, decide to play matchmaker with the pair. By coincidence, the man and woman have rooms opposite each other in the same hotel. The hotel’s manager and the staff detective become suspicious of what is transpiring when the photographers and the couple zigzag between the rooms. Eventually, the husband and wife discover the truth of their activities and leave the hotel together. The photographers, however, attempt to leave the hotel disguised as a moose, only to be chased amidst gunfire from the hotel manager.

== Cast ==
- Bobby Clark ... Flash
- Paul McCullough ... Blodgett
- Bud Jamison ... Bud Nimrod
- Constance Bergen ... Connie Nimrod
- Dorothy Granger ... Dolly
- Tom Kennedy ... Snoops, the house dick
- Harrison Greene ... J.N. Martin, hotel manager
- Doris MacMahon ... The Maid
- Jack Rice ... Desk Clerk

== Production history ==
Bobby Clark and Paul McCullough worked in circuses, vaudeville and on Broadway for two decades before they came to Hollywood to star in a series of short films. They first worked for Fox Pictures from 1929 to 1930 and then at RKO Radio Pictures from 1931 to 1935. The duo made 21 films at RKO.

Alibi Bye Bye, with its suggestive humor regarding adultery, ran afoul with the Kansas Board of Review, the state's motion picture censorship board. "Eliminate all indecent reactions of Clark after seeing a woman," wrote the board after screening the film, noting Bobby Clark's lascivious reactions to a pretty chambermaid in the film. "These are tom cat growls and pawing of earth. They occur several times in both reels."

== Paul McCullough's death ==
Following the completion of Alibi Bye Bye, Clark and McCullough returned to the stage for national tour of the revue Thumbs Up! The team was expected to return to Hollywood, but McCullough was in poor health. In early 1936, McCullough checked into a sanitarium in Massachusetts for undisclosed medical reasons. On March 23, 1936, McCullough was checked out of the sanitarium and stopped by a barber shop in Medford, Massachusetts for a shave. At the barber shop, he grabbed the razor and slashed his throat and wrists. He was taken to a hospital in Boston, where he died two days later.

Clark continued as a solo performer following his partner’s death, concentrating almost exclusively on the stage. He only made one film without McCullough, the 1938 extravaganza The Goldwyn Follies.
