= Lou Brock (producer) =

American film producer

- Born: August 21, 1892; Kalamazoo, Michigan
- Died: April 19, 1971 (aged 78); Los Angeles
- Other name: Louis Brock
- Occupation: Film producer
- Years active: 1930–1953

Lou Brock (August 21, 1892 – April 19, 1971) was an American film producer, screenwriter and director. He produced more than 70 films between 1930 and 1953. He was nominated for two awards at the 6th Academy Awards in 1934 in the category Best Short Subject. His film So This Is Harris won the award. He was born in Kalamazoo, Michigan and died in Los Angeles.

== Selected filmography ==
- Scratch-As-Catch-Can (1931)
- A Preferred List (1933)
- So This Is Harris (1933)
- Down to Their Last Yacht (1934)
- Behind the Mike (1937)
- Girls' Town (1942)
- The Shadow Returns (1946)
- Train to Alcatraz (1948)
