= Donald Davis (writer) =

American dramatist

Donald Davis (August 14, 1904 – March 28, 1992) was an American playwright and screenwriter. He wrote the play and film adaptations of The Good Earth, among others.

A native of New York City, Davis later moved to Palm Beach, Florida, where he died. He was married to actress Dorothy Matthews. His father was the playwright Owen Davis.

== Selected filmography ==
- Two Flaming Youths (1927)
- Dangerous Curves (1929)
- Rough Romance (1930)
- Damaged Lives (1933)
- The Good Earth (1937)
- City Without Men (1943)
