= Carl Strommen =

- Born: May 7, 1939 (age 87)
- Known for: composer, music teacher and conductor
- Style: symphonic music, HaFaBra music, choral music
- Website: http://www.carlstrommen.com/

Carl Strommen (born May 7, 1939) is an American composer, music pedagogue and conductor.

== Biography ==
Strommen first studied English literature at Long Island University in Brookville, New York, where he obtained his Bachelor of Arts . Subsequently he studied music at the City College of New York (CUNY) in New York, where he obtained his Master of Music . He completed his studies at the famed Eastman School of Music in Rochester, New York.

Initially he was conductor of the wind orchestras at the Mamaroneck Public Schools in Mamaroneck, New York, on the coast of Westchester County. He then became professor for orchestration, composition and arrangement at the C.W. Post College from the Long Island University in Brookville, New York.

He is known in the United States as a leading composer of instrumental and vocal music and especially his pedagogical works play a major role in the training of young musicians. From the 'American Society of Composers, Authors and Publishers' (ASCAP) he was awarded several times for his compositions. He also works as a teacher at workshops and courses for conductors of wind orchestras and is a sought-after guest conductor.

As a composer he mainly writes works for wind orchestras, orchestras, jazz bands and vocal music.

== Compositions ==
=== Works for orchestra ===
- Bluegrass Blowout , for string orchestra
- Festive Dance
- Go for Baroque , for string orchestra
- Good News Blues , for string orchestra
- Irish Song
- Stone Mountain Stomp , for string orchestra and piano
- Prairie song , for orchestra

=== Works for concert band ===
- 2002 Ramsgate March
- 2005 Elegy
- 2005 Fanfare for a Festival
- 2006 Nalukataq (guarantee of the Education through Cultural and Historic Organizations (ECHO) for the Barrow High School Band in Barrow, Alaska)
- Afton Variations
- Albion Sketches (Three British Folk Songs)
- All About the Blues
- Annie Laurie
- Back to School Blues
- Ballymore Down
- Barnum Woods (March)
- Blues Machine
- Bourrée
- Canterbury Walk
- Centennial
- Chelsea Bridge
- Chorale and Dance
- Cielo De Oro (Golden Sky)
- Cloud Splitter
- Country March
- Cumberland cross
- Dawnswood Overture
- Dedication
- Devon Point
- Do not Feed the Drummers
- Eagle Lake March
- Edgemont Festival Overture
- Flight of the Phoenix
- Flourish for a Celebration
- French Country Dance
- 2011 Fuego del Alma
- Gigue Française
- Glengarry Way
- Haleakala (House of the Sun)
- Harlequins Court March
- Highbridge Way
- Highlander
- In Their Honor
- Into the Wind
- Invocation and Dance
- King's Row
- Los Matadores
- Mazatlan
- Mountain Celebrations
- Pacifica
- Paths Of Glory
- Prairie Song
- Quaere Verum (Seek the Truth)
- Ravensgate
- Roscommon Way
- Scenes from the Peconic
- Scrimshaw Tales
- Shivaree
- Skywalker
- Sleighing Song
- Storm Mountain Jubilee
- Suo Gân
- The Grand Tetons , overture
- To a Distant Place
- Tir Na Nog (A Celtic Legend)
- Tribute
- Variations On A Sailing Song

=== Works for choirs ===
- 1982 Coventry Carol , for mixed choir
- 1984 Like an Eagle , for mixed choir (TOP MEGA HIT)
- 1984 Summer Wind , for mixed choir
- 1987 Together we Stand , for mixed choir
- 1997 Aura Lee , for mixed choir
- 2004 Setting Sail (Freedom of the Spirit) , for mixed choir, wind orchestra and piano - text: Walt Whitman s Leaves of Grass »(On the occasion of the 50th anniversary of the CW Post College of the Long Island University in Brookville (New York))
- A Christmas Promise , for mixed choir, guitar and drums
- A New Tomorrow , for mixed choir
- American Hymn , for mixed choir and piano
- Ash Grove
