= Bobby Clark (comedy actor) =

American comedy actor (1888–1960)

- Born: Robert Edwin Clark; 16 June 1888; Springfield, Ohio, U.S.
- Died: 12 February 1960 (aged 71); New York City, U.S.
- Occupation: Comedian
- Years active: 1906–1958
- Spouse: Angele Gaignat

Robert Edwin Clark (June 16, 1888 – February 12, 1960), was an American minstrel, vaudevillian, performer on stage, film, television and the circus. Known for his painted-on eyeglasses, he was part of a comedy team with Paul McCullough for 36 years.

Bobby Clark & Paul McCullough, in Kickin' the Crown Around

== Early years ==
He was born in Springfield, Ohio. While still in grammar school he formed a friendship with classmate Paul McCullough. The two attended tumbling classes, and began performing an acrobatic act in minstrel shows and later in the Ringling Brothers' Circus. The team worked as clowns from 1906 to 1912. In 1912, they made their debut in vaudeville with a pantomime act built around the simple act of placing a chair on top of a table. In 1922, they starred in Irving Berlin's Broadway show Music Box Revue.

== Film career ==
Beginning in 1929, they made a series of about 35 short comedy films, for FOX and RKO, some of which are still extant.

Clark and McCullough performed together until McCullough's suicide in March 1936.

In 1939, Clark appeared on Broadway in The Streets of Paris, sharing the stage with a new comedy act: Abbott and Costello.

Clark appeared on television during the 1950–51 television season, in the 8–9 pm Sunday night time slot of The Colgate Comedy Hour; however, Clark's four episodes were among those sponsored by Frigidaire and titled simply The Comedy Hour.

The Goldwyn Follies, his last and only film without Paul McCullough, in 1938, was the first Technicolor film produced by Samuel Goldwyn.

The Clark and McCullough shorts were made for an adult audience, with Clark writing much of the dialogue. Like Wheeler & Woolsey's films, they were not released for television, being considered too vulgar. So, they did not enjoy the renaissance of popularity with a new generation on television, like The Three Stooges or Laurel and Hardy.

Bobby Clark with Leni Stengel, in Kickin' the Crown Around (1933)

== Stage work ==
He appeared on Broadway in the Ziegfeld Follies of 1936. His reputation grew as he tackled roles in plays such as Sheridan's The Rivals, as well as in musical comedies and revues.

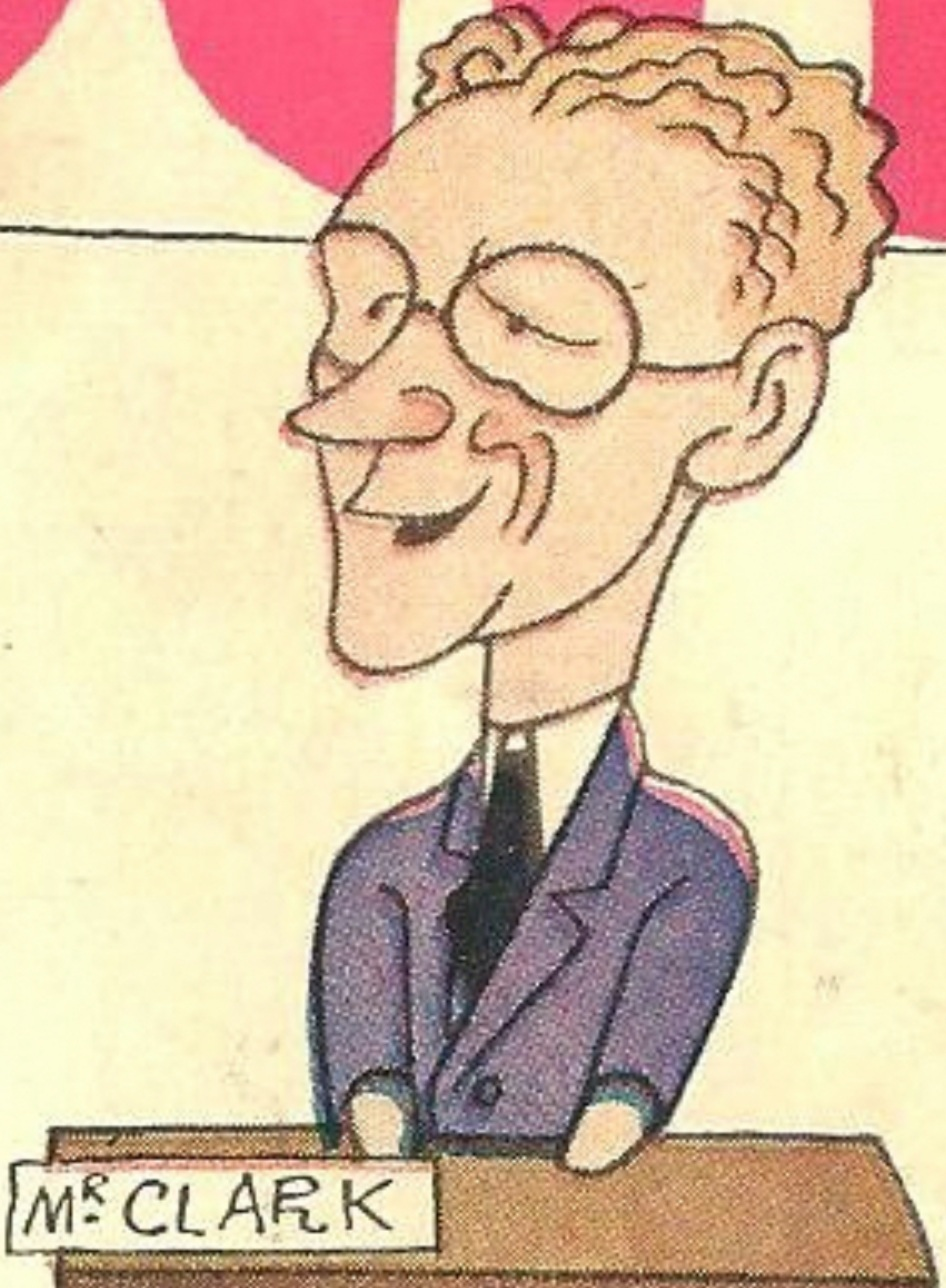
Caricature by Ralph Barton, 1925

Starting in 1942, producer Mike Todd cast him in five Broadway shows, all of them successful: the musical revue Star and Garter with Gypsy Rose Lee (1942–43); the Cole Porter musical Mexican Hayride (1944–45); Molière’s The Would-Be Gentleman (1946); and the revues As the Girls Go (1948) and Michael Todd's Peep Show (1950).

He came out of retirement to tour with Damn Yankees, 1956–58, in the role created on Broadway by Ray Walston.

As well as his better-known stage and film credits, Clark directed and appeared in such Restoration comedy as Congreve's Love For Love, and lectured on this period of theatre at the American Theater Wing.

Bobby Clark died in New York City in 1960.

== Personal life ==
He was married to Angele Gaignat from 1923 until his death. He died on February 12, 1960, and is buried in Woodlawn Cemetery in Bronx, New York.

== Selected filmography ==
- Two Flaming Youths (Paramount) (1927) (feature film) (also appearing were W. C. Fields, Moran and Mack)
- Scratch-As-Catch-Can (1931)
- Kickin' the Crown Around (1933)
- The Gay Nighties (1933)
- Alibi Bye Bye (1935)
- The Goldwyn Follies (1938)
