= Paul McCullough =

American actor and comedian (1883–1936)

- Clark & McCullough, in Kickin' the Crown Around (1933)
- Born: Paul Johnston McCullough; March 27, 1883; Springfield, Ohio, U.S.
- Died: March 25, 1936 (aged 52); Medford, Massachusetts, U.S.
- Resting place: Woodlawn Cemetery and Crematory; Everett, Massachusetts
- Occupations: Actor, comedian

Paul Johnston McCullough (March 27, 1883 – March 25, 1936) was an American actor and comedian who was one half of the comedy duo Clark and McCullough, along with fellow comedian Bobby Clark.

== Early life and career ==
Born in Springfield, Ohio, McCullough met his future partner Bobby Clark in elementary school. The two became friends and attended tumbling classes at a local YMCA together. Their childhood friendship grew into an adult partnership when they decided to pursue a career as a comedic duo. Billing themselves as "Clark and McCullough", they began their career performing in minstrel shows in the early 1900s. From 1906 to 1912, the pair performed in circuses before entering vaudeville in 1912. Due to the White Rats strike of 1916, Clark and McCullough were forced to enter into the burlesque circuit to continue working. During their time in burlesque, the duo would create some of their most well known sketches.

In their act, Clark was the dominant, motor-mouthed jokester while McCullough was the quieter straight man. In 1922, the team achieved mainstream stardom in Irving Berlin's Broadway show Music Box Revue. They went on to appear in the Broadway hit The Ramblers, which was filmed as the musical comedy The Cuckoos (1930), a vehicle for Wheeler & Woolsey. In mid-1928, Clark and McCullough moved to Hollywood where they signed with Fox Films Corporation for a reported $8,000 a week. The studio hoped the duo's stage popularity would transition to films and set about casting them in a series of two-reel comedy shorts known as The Clark & McCullough Comedies. In many of their films, McCullough's input was severely limited to a supporting role as Clark's antics generated the bulk of the humor. Their occupations in the films usually dictated what Clark's character name was: when photographers, such as in Alibi Bye Bye, Clark was named "Flash"; when chefs, Clark was "Cook"; when lawyers, Clark was "Blackstone", etc. According to the July 1931 issue of Picture Play magazine, the shorts were poorly received by critics and audiences alike. Around the Fox Studio Lot, the duo's film series were mockingly referred to as The Clark and McCullough Tragedies. After filming fourteen shorts, Fox dropped Clark and McCullough in early 1929.

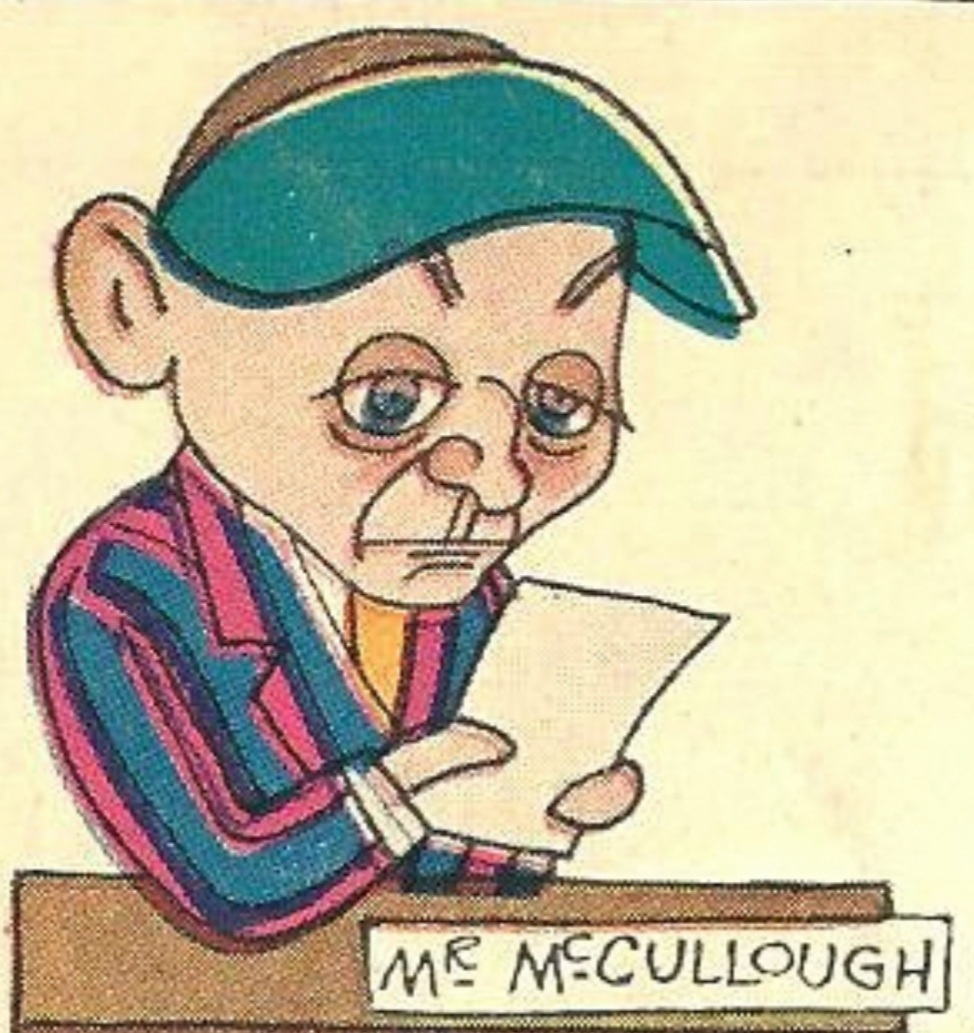
Caricature by Ralph Barton, 1925

In 1930, the duo signed with RKO Radio Pictures. They would go on to make twenty-two comedy shorts for RKO over the next five years. As with their Fox shorts, the duo's comedy did not transition well into the medium of film and was poorly received by critics and audiences. RKO attempted to remedy this by hiring big name directors and granting bigger budgets, but the shorts continued to be panned. Director Sam White, who directed three of Clark and McCullough's RKO shorts, later said that the duo's film career stalled because, on film, "...Bobby came across as annoying. Clark was one of those comedians who had to be seen live. In pictures, he was flat." Clark and McCullough's final film for RKO was Alibi Bye Bye (1935).

== Death ==
After shooting their last film in 1935, Clark and McCullough toured the country in a revue of Thumbs Up. After that tour was completed, they signed on as the lead act of an East Coast touring production of the George White Scandals. In early 1936, before production was set to begin, Bobby Clark returned to his wife in New York for a short rest while McCullough traveled to Massachusetts. He then checked himself into the New England Sanitarium in Stoneham for what was later described as "nervous exhaustion". Upon his release on March 23, McCullough's friend Frank T. Ford picked him up to drive him to the home he shared with his wife in Brookline. As McCullough and Ford drove through the town of Medford, McCullough asked Ford to stop at a local barbershop as he wanted to get a shave. While Ford waited in the car, McCullough entered the barbershop and ordered a shave. He casually chatted with the barber during his shave. After the shave was completed, McCullough grabbed the barber's razor and cut his throat from ear to ear and slashed his wrists. He was rushed to Lawrence Memorial Hospital where he died on March 25. McCullough's funeral was held on March 28 in Brookline. He is interred at Woodlawn Cemetery in Everett, Massachusetts.

The reason for McCullough's suicide remains a mystery. Upon learning of his partner's death, Clark publicly stated: "I think it was just something Paul couldn't help. Something that had been with him all the time and he didn't even know it." After several months of seclusion, Clark returned to performing as a solo act and would continue to perform until his death in 1960.
