= List of Academy Award winners and nominees from Germany =

This article is a list of German individuals working in the cinema industry who have been nominated for or have won an Academy Award. It includes artists and filmmakers of German nationality, as well as those with dual citizenship that have been awarded or honored by the Academy.

== Acting categories ==
=== Actor in a Leading Role ===
Actor
Year	Name	Film	Status	Milestone / Notes
1928/29	Emil Jannings	The Way of All Flesh & The Last Command	Won	Jannings was a Swiss-born German actor.

=== Actor in a Supporting Role ===
Supporting Actor
Year	Name	Film	Status	Milestone / Notes
1940	Albert Bassermann	Foreign Correspondent	Nominated	
1996	Armin Mueller-Stahl	Shine	Nominated	
2009	Christoph Waltz	Inglourious Basterds	Won	Waltz is an Austrian-German actor.
2012	Christoph Waltz	Django Unchained	Won	Waltz is an Austrian-German actor.

=== Actress in a Leading Role ===
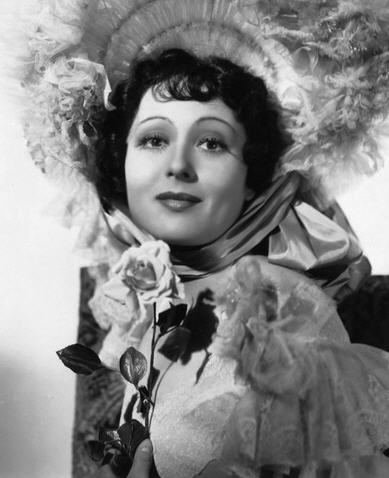
Luise Rainer in The Great Ziegfeld

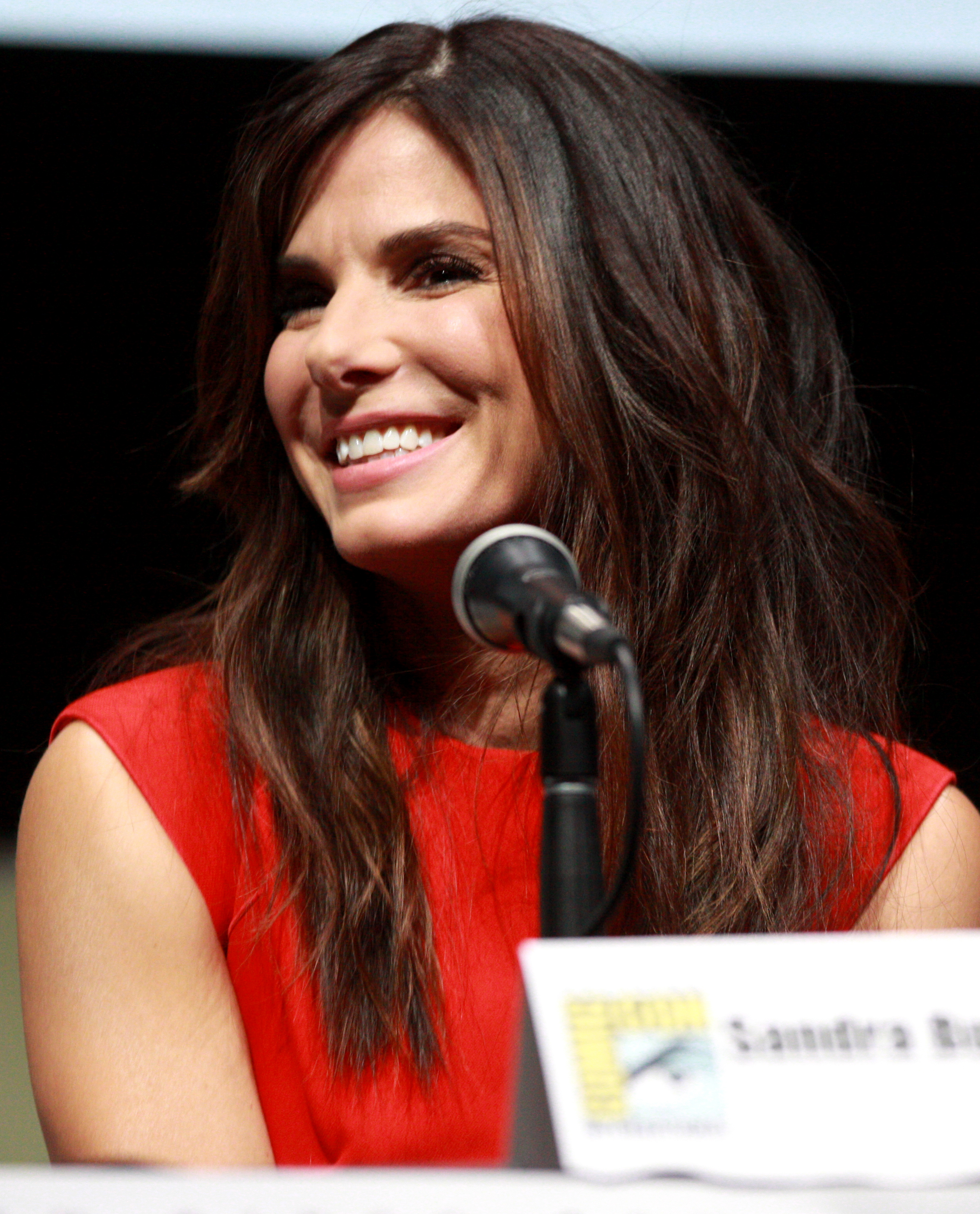
Sandra Bullock won Best Actress for her role in The Blind Side (2009)

Actress
Year	Name	Film	Status	Milestone / Notes
1930/31	Marlene Dietrich	Morocco	Nominated	
1936	Luise Rainer	The Great Ziegfeld	Won	Due to the political atmosphere, Rainer was promoted to be Austrian by this time.
1937	Luise Rainer	The Good Earth	Won	First actor regardless of gender to win two consecutive awards.
2010	Sandra Bullock	The Blind Side	Won	Bullock's mother is German and she holds dual German-American citizenship. She speaks some German, but she is not fluent, as is evident during interviews.
2014	Sandra Bullock	Gravity	Nominated	Bullock's mother is German and she holds dual German-American citizenship. She speaks some German, but she is not fluent, as is evident during interviews.
2023	Sandra Hüller	Anatomy of a Fall	Nominated	

=== Actress in a Supporting Role ===
Supporting Actress
Year	Name	Film	Status	Milestone / Notes
2021	Kirsten Dunst	The Power of the Dog	Nominated	Born in the USA, Dunst has a German father. She obtained German citizenship in 2011.

== Best Art Direction ==
Art Direction
Year	Name	Film	Status	Milestone / Notes
1927/28	Rochus Gliese	Sunrise: A Song of Two Humans	Nominated	
1928/29	Hans Dreier	The Patriot	Nominated	No official nominees were announced that year.
1929	Hans Dreier	The Love Parade	Nominated	
1930	Hans Dreier	The Vagabond King	Nominated	
1930	Hans Dreier	Morocco	Nominated	
1932	Hans Dreier	A Farewell to Arms	Nominated	Shared with the American-born Roland Anderson.
1937	Hans Dreier	Souls at Sea	Nominated	Shared with the American-born Roland Anderson.
1938	Carl Jules Weyl	The Adventures of Robin Hood	Won	
1938	Hans Dreier	If I Were King	Nominated	Shared with the American-born John B. Goodman.
1939	Hans Dreier	Beau Geste	Nominated	Shared with the American-born Robert Odell.
1940	Hans Dreier	Arise, My Love	Nominated	Nominated in the black-and-white category. Shared with the American-born Robert Usher.
1940	Hans Dreier	North West Mounted Police	Nominated	Nominated in the color category. Shared with the American-born Roland Anderson.
1941	Hans Dreier	Hold Back the Dawn	Nominated	Nominated in the black-and-white category. Shared with the American-born Robert Usher, and Samuel M. Comer.
1942	Hans Dreier	Reap the Wild Wind	Nominated	Nominated in the color category. Shared with the American-born Roland Anderson, and George Sawley.
1942	Hans Dreier	Take a Letter, Darling	Nominated	Nominated in the black-and-white category. Shared with the American-born Roland Anderson, and Samuel M. Comer.
1943	Hans Dreier	For Whom the Bell Tolls	Nominated	Nominated in the color category. Shared with the American-born Haldane Douglas, and Bertram C. Granger.
1943	Hans Dreier; Ernst Fegté	Five Graves to Cairo	Nominated	Nominated in the black-and-white category. Shared with the American-born Bertram C. Granger.
1943	Carl Jules Weyl	Mission to Moscow	Nominated	Nominated in the black-and-white category. Shared with the American-born George James Hopkins.
1944	Paul Huldschinsky	Gaslight	Won	Nominated in the black-and-white category. Shared with the Irish-American Cedric Gibbons, and American-born William Ferrari and Edwin B. Willis.
1944	Walter Holscher	Address Unknown	Nominated	Nominated in the black-and-white category. Holscher was a German-born American art director. Shared with the American-born Lionel Banks, and Joseph Kish.
1944	Ernst Fegté	The Princess and the Pirate	Nominated	Nominated in the color category. Shared with the American-born Howard Bristol.
1944	Hans Dreier	Lady in the Dark	Nominated	Nominated in the color category. Shared with the American-born Raoul Pene Du Bois, and Ray Moyer.
1944	Hans Dreier	No Time for Love	Nominated	Nominated in the black-and-white category. Shared with the American-born Robert Usher, and Samuel M. Comer.
1945	Hans Dreier	Love Letters	Nominated	Nominated in the black-and-white category. Shared with the American-born Roland Anderson, Samuel M. Comer, and Ray Moyer.
1945	Hans Dreier; Ernst Fegté	Frenchman's Creek	Won	Nominated in the color category. Shared with the American-born Samuel M. Comer.
1946	Hans Dreier	Kitty	Nominated	Nominated in the black-and-white category. Shared with the American-born Walter H. Tyler, Samuel M. Comer, and Ray Moyer.
1947	Alfred Junge	Black Narcissus	Won	Nominated in the color category.
1948	Hein Heckroth	The Red Shoes	Won	Nominated in the color category. Shared with the British-born Arthur Lawson.
1950	Hans Dreier	Sunset Boulevard	Won	Nominated in the black-and-white category. First person to win both art direction categories in the same year. Shared with the American-born John Meehan, Samuel M. Comer, and Ray Moyer.
1950	Hans Dreier	Samson and Delilah	Won	Nominated in the color category. Shared with the American-born Walter H. Tyler, Samuel M. Comer, and Ray Moyer.
1950	Ernst Fegté	Destination Moon	Nominated	Nominated in the color category. Shared with the American-born George Sawley.
1951	Hein Heckroth	The Tales of Hoffmann	Nominated	Nominated in the color category.
1953	Alfred Junge	Knights of the Round Table	Nominated	Nominated in the color category. Shared with the British-born Hans Peters, and John Jarvis.
1953	Paul Markwitz; Fritz Maurischat	Martin Luther	Nominated	Nominated in the black-and-white category.
1954	Max Ophüls	Le Plaisir	Nominated	Nominated in the black-and-white category. First person to receive nominations for writing and art direction.
1957	Walter Holscher	Pal Joey	Nominated	Shared with the American-born William Kiernan, and Louis Diage.
1959	Franz Bachelin	Journey to the Center of the Earth	Nominated	Nominated in the color category. Shared with the American-born Lyle R. Wheeler, Herman A. Blumenthal, Walter M. Scott, and Joseph Kish.
1968	Harry Lange	2001: A Space Odyssey	Nominated	Lange was a German-born British. Shared with the British-born Anthony Masters, and Ernest Archer.
1972	Hans Jürgen Kiebach; Herbert Strabel; Rolf Zehetbauer	Cabaret	Won	
1980	Harry Lange	Star Wars Episode V: The Empire Strikes Back	Nominated	Shared with the British-born Norman Reynolds, Michael D. Ford, and Alan Tomkins, and Welsh-born Leslie Dilley.
1981	Patrizia von Brandenstein	Ragtime	Nominated	of German-Russian descent.
1984	Patrizia von Brandenstein	Amadeus	Won	of German-Russian descent.
1985	J. Michael Riva	The Color Purple	Nominated	The grandson of German actress Marlene Dietrich.
1987	Patrizia von Brandenstein	The Untouchables	Nominated	of German-Russian descent.
1996	Brigitte Broch	Romeo + Juliet	Nominated	Broch is a German-born Mexican production designer. Shared with the Australian-born Catherine Martin.
2001	Brigitte Broch	Moulin Rouge!	Won	Broch is a German-born Mexican production designer. Shared with the Australian-born Catherine Martin.
2015	Bernhard Henrich	Bridge of Spies	Nominated	Shared with the American-born Adam Stockhausen and Rena DeAngelo.

== Best Cinematography ==
Cinematography
Year	Name	Film	Status	Milestone / Notes
1937	Karl Freund	The Good Earth	Won	
1941	Karl Freund	The Chocolate Soldier	Nominated	Nominated in the black-and-white category.
1941	Karl Freund	Blossoms in the Dust	Nominated	Nominated in the color category.
1961	Eugen Schüfftan	The Hustler	Won	Nominated in the black-and-white category.
1964	Walter Lassally	Zorba the Greek	Won	Nominated in the black-and-white category.
1980	Ralf D. Bode	Coal Miner's Daughter	Nominated	Bode was a German-born American cinematographer.
1981	Jost Vacano	Das Boot	Nominated	
1987	Michael Ballhaus	Broadcast News	Nominated	
1989	Michael Ballhaus	The Fabulous Baker Boys	Nominated	
2002	Michael Ballhaus	Gangs of New York	Nominated	
2022	Florian Hoffmeister	Tár	Nominated	

== Best Costume Design ==
Costume Design
Year	Name	Film	Status	Milestone / Notes
1951	Hein Heckroth	The Tales of Hoffmann	Nominated	Nominated in the color category.
1994	Moidele Bickel	Queen Margot (La reine Margot)	Nominated	
2011	Lisy Christl	Anonymous	Nominated	
2020	Bina Daigeler	Mulan	Nominated	
2024	Lisy Christl	Conclave	Nominated	

== Documentary categories ==
=== Documentary Feature Film ===
Documentary Feature
Year	Name	Film	Status	Milestone / Notes
1950	Curt Oertel	The Titan: Story of Michelangelo	Won	
1959	Bernhard Grzimek	Serengeti darf nicht sterben	Won	
1970	Harald Reinl	Erinnerungen an die Zukunft	Nominated	
1971	Marcel Ophüls	Le chagrin et la pitié	Nominated	
1972	Eckehard Munck	The Silent Revolution	Nominated	
1973	Bengt von zur Mühlen	Schlacht um Berlin	Nominated	
1980	Bengt von zur Mühlen	Der Gelbe Stern	Nominated	Shared with the Swiss-born Arthur Cohn.
1988	Marcel Ophüls	Hôtel Terminus	Won	
1999	Wim Wenders; Ulrich Felsberg	Buena Vista Social Club	Nominated	
2008	Werner Herzog	Encounters at the End of the World	Nominated	Shared with the American-born Henry Kaiser.
2011	Gian-Piero Ringel; Wim Wenders	Pina	Nominated	
2014	Wim Wenders	The Salt of the Earth	Nominated	Shared with the Brazilian-born Juliano Ribeiro Salgado, and French-born David Rosier.
2014	Dirk Wilutzky	Citizenfour	Won	Shared with the American-born Laura Poitras, and French-born Mathilde Bonnefoy.

=== Documentary Short Film ===
Documentary Short Film
Year	Name	Film	Status	Milestone / Notes
1949	Edward Selzer	So Much for So Little	Won	
1972	Peter Schamoni	Hundertwassers Regentag	Nominated	
1974	Robin Lehman	Don't	Won	
1975	Robin Lehman	The End of the Game	Won	
1975	Manfred Baier	Millions of Years Ahead of Man	Nominated	
2003	Katja Esson	Ferry Tales	Nominated	

== Best Director ==
Director
Year	Name	Film	Status	Milestone / Notes
1928/29	Ernst Lubitsch	The Patriot	Nominated	No official nominees were announced.
1929	Ernst Lubitsch	The Love Parade	Nominated	
1937	William Dieterle	The Life of Emile Zola	Nominated	
1946	Robert Siodmak	The Killers	Nominated	
1947	Henry Koster	The Bishop's Wife	Nominated	
1966	Mike Nichols	Who's Afraid of Virginia Woolf?	Nominated	Nichols is a German-born American director and producer.
1967	Mike Nichols	The Graduate	Won	Nichols is a German-born American director and producer.
1982	Wolfgang Petersen	Das Boot	Nominated	
1983	Mike Nichols	Silkwood	Nominated	
1988	Mike Nichols	Working Girl	Nominated	

== Best Editing ==
Editing
Year	Name	Film	Status	Milestone / Notes
1938	Tom Held	The Great Waltz	Nominated	
1938	Tom Held	Test Pilot	Nominated	
1982	Hannes Nikel	Das Boot	Nominated	
1985	Rudi Fehr	Prizzi's Honor	Nominated	Shared with his American-born daughter, Kaja Fehr.

== Best International Feature Film ==
International Feature Film
Year	Director	Film	Original Title	Status	Milestone / Notes
1956	Helmut Käutner	The Captain from Köpenick	Der Hauptmann von Köpenick	Nominated	Producers Gyula Trebitsch and Walter Koppel were officially nominated in 1957.
1957	Robert Siodmak	The Devil Strikes at Night	Nachts, wenn der Teufel kam	Nominated	
1958	Franz Peter Wirth	Arms and the Man	Helden	Nominated	
1959	Bernhard Wicki	Die Brücke	Die Brücke	Nominated	
1973	Maximilian Schell	The Pedestrian	Der Fußgänger	Nominated	First filmmaker to have two of his films nominated for different countries.
1976	Frank Beyer	Jacob the Liar	Jakob der Lügner	Nominated	First and only film from East Germany to be nominated for an Academy Award.
1978	Hans W. Geißendörfer	The Glass Cell	Die gläserne Zelle	Nominated	
1979	Volker Schlöndorff	The Tin Drum	Die Blechtrommel	Won	First German film to win the Oscar in this category. It is also the only West German film to win this category prior to German reunification in 1990.
1985	Agnieszka Holland	Angry Harvest	Bittere Ernte	Nominated	First female filmmaker to direct a German-language nominated film.
1990	Michael Verhoeven	The Nasty Girl	Das schreckliche Mädchen	Nominated	First submission of reunified Germany to be nominated.
1992	Helmut Dietl	Schtonk!	Schtonk!	Nominated	
1997	Caroline Link	Beyond Silence	Jenseits der Stille	Nominated	Some parts in English, German Sign Language & Spanish.
2002	Caroline Link	Nowhere in Africa	Nirgendwo in Afrika	Won	Second German film to win the Oscar in this category. It is also the first film from a reunified Germany to win. Caroline Link is the second female filmmaker to direct a Foreign-Language-Film winner.
2004	Oliver Hirschbiegel	Downfall	Der Untergang	Nominated	
2005	Marc Rothemund	Sophie Scholl – The Final Days	Sophie Scholl – Die letzten Tage	Nominated	
2006	Florian Henckel von Donnersmarck	The Lives of Others	Das Leben der Anderen	Won	Third German film to win the Oscar in this category. It is also the second film from a reunified Germany to win.
2008	Uli Edel	The Baader Meinhof Complex	Der Baader-Meinhof-Komplex	Nominated	
2009	Michael Haneke	The White Ribbon	Das weiße Band	Nominated	
2016	Maren Ade	Toni Erdmann	Toni Erdmann	Nominated	Some parts in English and Romanian.
2018	Florian Henckel von Donnersmarck	Never Look Away	Werk ohne Autor	Nominated	
2022	Edward Berger	All Quiet on the Western Front	Im Westen nichts Neues	Won	Fourth German film to win the Oscar in this category. It is also the third film from a reunified Germany to win.
2023	İlker Çatak	The Teachers' Lounge	Das Lehrerzimmer	Nominated	
2024	Mohammad Rasoulof	The Seed of the Sacred Fig	دانه‌ی انجیر معابد	Nominated	Film is completely in Persian

== Best Makeup and Hairstyling ==
Makeup and Hairstyling
Year	Name	Film	Status	Milestone / Notes
2019	Nicki Ledermann	Joker	Nominated	Shared with the American-born Kay Georgiou.
2020	Claudia Stolze	Emma.	Nominated	Stolze is a German-born British make-up artist. Shared with British-born Marese Langan and American-born Laura Allen.

== Music categories ==
=== Best Original Score ===
Original Music Score
Year	Name	Film	Status	Milestone / Notes
1934	Victor Schertzinger	One Night of Love	Won	
1937	Victor Schertzinger	Something to Sing About	Nominated	
1937	Franz Waxman	The Young in Heart	Nominated	
1940	Franz Waxman	Rebecca	Nominated	
1941	Franz Waxman	Dr. Jekyll and Mr. Hyde	Nominated	
1941	Franz Waxman	Suspicion	Nominated	
1941	Ernst Toch	Ladies in Retirement	Nominated	
1942	Ray Heindorf; Heinz Roemheld	Yankee Doodle Dandy	Won	
1942	Friedrich Hollaender	The Talk of the Town	Nominated	
1942	Werner Heymann	To Be or Not to Be	Nominated	
1943	Ray Heindorf	This Is the Army	Won	
1943	Hanns Eisler	Hangmen Also Die!	Nominated	
1944	Kurt Weill; Werner R. Heymann	Knickerbocker Holiday	Nominated	
1944	Ferde Grofe	Minstrel Man	Nominated	
1944	Ernst Toch	Address Unknown	Nominated	
1945	Jerome Kern	Can't Help Singing	Nominated	
1946	Ray Heindorf	Night and Day	Nominated	Shared with the American-born Max Steiner.
1946	Franz Waxman	Humoresque	Nominated	
1947	Hugo Friedhofer	The Bishop's Wife	Nominated	
1948	Hugo Friedhofer	Joan of Arc	Nominated	
1950	Adolph Deutsch	Annie Get Your Gun	Won	
1950	Franz Waxman	Sunset Boulevard	Won	
1951	Franz Waxman	A Place in the Sun	Won	
1951	Adolph Deutsch	Show Boat	Nominated	
1953	Adolph Deutsch	The Band Wagon	Nominated	
1953	Friedrich Hollaender	The 5,000 Fingers of Dr. T.	Nominated	
1953	Hugo Friedhofer	Above and Beyond	Nominated	
1953	André Previn	Kiss Me Kate	Nominated	Shared with the American-born Saul Chaplin.
1954	Franz Waxman	The Silver Chalice	Nominated	
1954	Adolph Deutsch	Seven Brides for Seven Brothers	Won	
1955	Adolph Deutsch	Oklahoma!	Won	
1955	André Previn	It's Always Fair Weather	Nominated	
1956	Hugo Friedhofer	Between Heaven and Hell	Nominated	
1957	Hugo Friedhofer	Boy on a Dolphin	Nominated	
1957	Hugo Friedhofer	An Affair to Remember	Nominated	
1958	Hugo Friedhofer	The Young Lions	Nominated	
1958	André Previn	Gigi	Won	
1959	André Previn	Porgy and Bess	Won	Shared with the American-born Ken Darby.
1959	Franz Waxman	The Nun's Story	Nominated	
1962	Franz Waxman	Taras Bulba	Nominated	
1962	Ray Heindorf	The Music Man	Won	First winner of Best Music, Scoring of Music, Adaptation or Treatment.
1963	André Previn	Irma la Douce	Won	Winner of Best Music, Scoring of Music, Adaptation or Treatment.
1964	André Previn	My Fair Lady	Won	Winner of Best Music, Scoring of Music, Adaptation or Treatment.
1973	André Previn	Jesus Christ Superstar	Nominated	Nominated for Best Music, Scoring Original Song Score and/or Adaptation. Shared with the English-born Andrew Lloyd Webber and Chilean-born American Herbert W. Spencer.
1975	Jack Nitzsche	One Flew Over the Cuckoo's Nest	Nominated	
1982	Jack Nitzsche	An Officer and a Gentleman	Nominated	
1988	Hans Zimmer	Rain Man	Nominated	
1994	Hans Zimmer	The Lion King	Won	
1996	Hans Zimmer	The Preacher's Wife	Nominated	Nominated in the Musical or Comedy Score category.
1997	Hans Zimmer	As Good as It Gets	Nominated	Nominated in the Musical or Comedy Score category.
1998	Hans Zimmer	The Thin Red Line	Nominated	Nominated in the Dramatic Score category.
1998	Hans Zimmer	The Prince of Egypt	Nominated	Nominated in the Musical or Comedy Score category. Shared with the American-born Stephen Schwartz.
2000	Hans Zimmer	Gladiator	Nominated	
2009	Hans Zimmer	Sherlock Holmes	Nominated	
2010	Hans Zimmer	Inception	Nominated	
2014	Hans Zimmer	Interstellar	Nominated	
2016	Hauschka	Lion	Nominated	Shared with the American-born Dustin O'Halloran.
2017	Hans Zimmer	Dunkirk	Nominated	
2021	Hans Zimmer	Dune	Won	
2022	Volker Bertelmann	All Quiet on the Western Front	Won	
2024	Volker Bertelmann	Conclave	Nominated	
2025	Max Richter	Hamnet	Nominated	

=== Best Original Song ===
Original Song
Year	Name	Film and Song	Status	Milestone / Notes
1935	Jerome Kern	Roberta for the song: "Lovely to Look at"	Nominated	
1936	Jerome Kern	Swing Time for the song: "The Way You Look Tonight"	Won	
1937	Friedrich Hollaender	Artists and Models for the song: "Whispers in the Dark"	Nominated	Shared with the American-born Leo Robin.
1941	Jerome Kern	Lady Be Good for the song: "The Last Time in Paris"	Won	
1942	Jerome Kern	You Were Never Lovelier for the song: "Dearly Beloved"	Nominated	
1944	Jerome Kern	Cover Girl for the song: "Long Ago (and Far Away)"	Nominated	
1945	Jerome Kern	"Can't Help Singing" for the song: "More and More"	Nominated	
1946	Jerome Kern	Centennial Summer for the song: "All Through The Day"	Nominated	
1948	Friedrich Hollaender	That Lady in Ermine for the song: "This Is the Moment"	Nominated	Shared with the American-born Leo Robin.
1987	Harold Faltermeyer	Beverly Hills Cop II for the song: "Shakedown"	Nominated	Shared with the British-born Keith Forsey and American-born Bob Seger.

== Best Picture ==
Best Picture
Year	Name	Film	Status	Milestone / Notes
1928/29	Ernst Lubitsch	The Patriot	Nominated	
1929	Ernst Lubitsch	The Love Parade	Nominated	
1931	Ernst Lubitsch	The Smiling Lieutenant	Nominated	
1932	Ernst Lubitsch	One Hour with You	Nominated	
1935	Henry Blanke	A Midsummer Night's Dream	Nominated	
1936	Henry Blanke	Anthony Adverse	Nominated	
1936	Henry Blanke	The Story of Louis Pasteur	Nominated	
1937	Henry Blanke	The Life of Emile Zola	Won	
1938	Henry Blanke	Jezebel	Nominated	Shared with the American-born Hal B. Wallis.
1943	Ernst Lubitsch	Heaven Can Wait	Nominated	
1948	Henry Blanke	The Treasure of the Sierra Madre	Nominated	
1959	Henry Blanke	The Nun's Story	Nominated	
1993	Mike Nichols	The Remains of the Day	Nominated	Nichols is a German-born American director and producer. Shared with the American-born John Calley and Indian-born Ismail Merchant.
2005	Michael Ohoven	Capote	Nominated	Shared with the American-born Caroline Baron and Canadian-born William Vince.
2012	Stefan Arndt; Margaret Ménégoz	Amour	Nominated	Shared with the Austrian-born Veit Heiduschka and Michael Katz.
2015	Michael Schaefer	The Martian	Nominated	Shared with the British-born Simon Kinberg, Ridley Scott and Mark Huffam.
2022	Malte Grunert	All Quiet on the Western Front	Nominated	First German speaking film nominated in Best Picture.

== Best Short Film ==
=== Live Action ===
Live Action Short Film
Year	Name	Film and Song	Status	Milestone / Notes
1956	Konstantin Kalser	Crashing the Water Barrier	Won	
1965	Lothar Wolff	Fortress of Peace	Nominated	
1976	Andre R. Guttfreund	In the Region of Ice	Won	
1993	Pepe Danquardt	Schwarzfahrer	Won	
1998	Alexander Jovy	Holiday Romance	Nominated	Shared with the British-born JJ Keith.
1999	Marc-Andreas Bochert; Gabriele Lins	Kleingeld	Nominated	
2000	Florian Gallenberger	Quiero ser (I want to be...)	Won	
2001	Johannes Kiefer	Gregors größte Erfindung	Nominated	
2002	Lexi Alexander	Johnny Flynton	Nominated	Shared with the American-born Alexander Buono.
2003	Florian Baxmeyer	Die rote Jacke	Nominated	
2006	Ulrike Grote	Ausreißer	Nominated	
2008	Jochen Alexander Freydank	Spielzeugland	Won	
2011	Max Zähle; Stefan Gieren	Raju	Nominated	
2015	Patrick Vollrath	Everything Will Be Okay (Alles wird gut)	Nominated	

=== Animated ===
Animated Short Film
Year	Name	Film and Song	Status	Milestone / Notes
1931-32	Leon Schlesinger	It's Got Me Again!	Nominated	
1935	Rudolf Ising	The Calico Dragon	Nominated	
1936	Rudolf Ising	The Old Mill Pond	Nominated	
1939	Leon Schlesinger	Detouring America	Nominated	
1940	Leon Schlesinger	A Wild Hare	Nominated	
1940	Rudolf Ising	The Milky Way	Won	
1941	Leon Schlesinger	Hiawatha's Rabbit Hunts	Nominated	
1941	Leon Schlesinger	Rhapsody in Rivets	Nominated	
1941	Max Fleischer	Superman	Nominated	
1941	Rudolf Ising	The Calico Dragon	Nominated	
1942	Leon Schlesinger	Pigs in a Polka	Nominated	
1943	Leon Schlesinger	Greetings Bait	Nominated	
1944	Leon Schlesinger	Swooner Crooner	Nominated	
1945	Edward Selzer	Life with Feathers	Nominated	
1946	Edward Selzer	Walky Talky Hawky	Nominated	
1948	Edward Selzer	Mouse Wreckers	Nominated	
1949	Edward Selzer	For Cent-imental Reasons	Won	
1949	Edward Selzer	Canary Row	Nominated	
1953	Edward Selzer	From A to Z-Z-Z-Z	Nominated	
1954	Edward Selzer	Sandy Claws	Nominated	
1957	Edward Selzer	Birds Anonymous	Won	
1957	Edward Selzer	Tabasco Road	Nominated	
1966	Wolf Koenig	The Drag	Nominated	
1966	Wolf Koenig	What on Earth!	Nominated	
1967	Wolf Koenig	The House That Jack Built	Nominated	
1974	Wolfgang Reitherman	Winnie the Pooh and Tigger Too!	Nominated	
1989	Christoph Lauenstein; Wolfgang Lauenstein	Balance	Won	
1996	Thomas Stellmach; Tyron Montgomery	Quest	Won	Montgomery is an Irish-born German.
2000	Steffen Schäffler; Anette Schäffler	Periwig Maker	Nominated	
2002	Chris Stenner; Heidi Wittlinger	Das Rad	Nominated	Arvid Uibel directed the film alongside Stenner and Wittlinger, but died in 2000 and was not nominated.
2010	Max Lang; Jakob Schuh	Der Grüffelo	Nominated	
2013	Max Lang; Jan Lachauer	Room on the Broom	Nominated	
2017	Jakob Schuh; Jan Lachauer	Revolting Rhymes	Nominated	

== Best Sound Mixing ==
Sound Mixing
Year	Name	Film	Status	Milestone / Notes
1982	Milan Bor	Das Boot	Nominated	Shared with the British-born Trevor Pyke and American-born Mike Le Mare.

== Best Visual Effects ==
Visual Effects
Year	Name	Film	Status	Milestone / Notes
1996	Volker Engel	Independence Day	Won	Shared with the American-born Douglas Smith, Clay Pinney and Joseph Viskocil.
2010	Stephan Trojansky	Hereafter	Nominated	Shared with the American-born Michael Owens and Bryan Grill, and Australian-born Joe Farrell.
2017	Gerd Nefzer	Blade Runner 2049	Won	Shared with the American-born John Nelson and Richard R. Hoover, and British-born Paul Lambert.
2021	Gerd Nefzer	Dune	Won	Shared with the British-born Paul Lambert, and American-born Tristan Myles and Brian Connor.
2024	Gerd Nefzer	Dune: Part Two	Won	Shared with Canadian-born Paul Lambert, Stephen James, and Rhys Salcombe

== Writing categories ==
=== Best Adapted Screenplay ===
Adapted Screenplay
Year	Name	Film	Status	Milestone / Notes
1928/29	Hanns Kräly	The Patriot	Won	No official nominees have been announced that year.
1928/29	Hanns Kräly	The Last of Mrs. Cheyney	Nominated	No official nominees have been announced that year.
1948	Irma von Cube	Johnny Belinda	Nominated	First German woman to be nominated for a writing award. Shared with the American-born Allen Vincent.
1951	Max Ophüls	La Ronde	Nominated	Shared with the French-born Jacques Natanson.
1958	Don Mankiewicz	I Want to Live!	Nominated	Mankiewicz is a German-born American screenwriter. Shared with the American-born Nelson Gidding.
1982	Wolfgang Petersen	Das Boot	Nominated	
1986	Ruth Prawer Jhabvala	A Room with a View	Won	Jhabvala is a German-born British screenwriter, with an Indian citizenship before moving to the US.
1992	Ruth Prawer Jhabvala	Howards End	Won	Jhabvala is a German-born British screenwriter, with an Indian citizenship before moving to the US.
1993	Ruth Prawer Jhabvala	The Remains of the Day	Nominated	Jhabvala is a German-born British screenwriter, with an Indian citizenship before moving to the US.
2022	Edward Berger	All Quiet on the Western Front	Nominated	Shared with the British Lesley Paterson and Ian Stokell.

=== Best Original Screenplay ===
Original Screenplay
Year	Name	Film	Status	Milestone / Notes
1940	Heinz Herald	Dr. Ehrlich's Magic Bullet	Nominated	Shared with John Huston, and Norman Burnstine
1962	Wolfgang Reinhardt	Freud: The Secret Passion	Nominated	Shared with Charles Kaufman
2024	Moritz Binder	September 5	Nominated	Shared with Tim Fehlbaum, and Alex David

=== Best Story ===
Best Story
Year	Name	Film	Status	Milestone / Notes
1937	Heinz Herald	The Life of Emile Zola	Won	Shared with the Hungarian-American Geza Herczeg.
1937	Hanns Kräly	One Hundred Men and a Girl	Nominated	Shared with the American-born Charles Kenyon, Bruce Manning and James Mulhauser.
1938	Frederick Kohner	Mad About Music	Nominated	Shared with the American-born Marcella Burke.
1940	Walter Reisch	Comrade X	Nominated	
1944	Alfred Neumann	None Shall Escape	Nominated	Shared with the Austrian-born Joseph Than.
This category was abolished after the 29th Academy Awards.

== Special awards ==
This list focuses on German-born honorees.

=== Academy Honorary Award ===
Academy Honorary Award
Year	Name	Status	Milestone / Notes
1947	Ernst Lubitsch	Honored	"for his distinguished contributions to the art of the motion picture."

=== Gordon E. Sawyer Award ===
Gordon E. Sawyer Award
Year	Name	Status	Milestone / Notes
1992	Erich Kästner	Honored	Kästner received the Gordon E. Sawyer Award for his life's work as a movie camera designer.

=== Scientific and Technical Service Award ===
John A. Bonner Medal of Commendation
Year	Name	Status	Milestone / Notes
1992	Volker Bahnemann	Honored	Shared with Burton "Bud" Stone. Bahnemann is a German-born American manager. He became a US-citizen in 1984.

== Tally of nominations and winners ==
No. of wins	No. of nominations
54	227

== See also ==
- Cinema of Germany
- List of German films
