= Dolgin =

Dolgin is a surname. Notable people with the surname include:

- Bryan Dolgin, American sportscaster
- Deborah Cordz Dolgin, American politician
- Gail Dolgin, American filmmaker
- Janet L. Dolgin, American legal scholar
- Josh Dolgin, better known as Socalled (born 1976), Canadian rapper
- Kalmon Dolgin, American real estate developer
- Stephen Dolgin, American pediatric surgeon

== See also ==
- Dolgun
