= Das Rauschen des Meeres =

- Film poster
- Directed by: Ana Rocha Fernandes; Torsten Truscheit
- Produced by: Thomas Reisser; Marcus Machura
- Starring: Tyron Ricketts; Sven Pippig; Ronnie Janot; Mayra Andrade; Ralph Martin; Malayka Fernandes
- Cinematography: Philipp Timme
- Music by: Andreas Schäfer; Mayra Andrade
- Production company: Niama-Film GmbH (Stuttgart)
- Distributed by: ARTE
- Release date: 27 October 2010
- Running time: 25 minutes
- Country: Germany
- Language: German

Das Rauschen des Meeres (lit. 'The Sound of the sea') is a 2010 short drama film directed by Ana Rocha Fernandes and Torsten Truscheit. It was filmed in 2009. The movie features Tyron Ricketts and Cape Verdean singer Mayra Andrade.

== Synopsis ==
A refugee from Africa has been sitting in a detained prison for several days without any papers of his identity. When it is assumed, the detainee could take his life, a guard would be taken care of him. He discovers that refugee with a photo depicting a little girl. As a result, the attendant becomes interested in the prisoner and a friendship develops between the two.

Later, the guard risks his employment to help the prisoner escape from the detained prison so that he can find his daughter, the girl in the photo.

== Cast ==
- Tyron Ricketts - prisoner
- Sven Pippig - prisoner of war
- Ronnie Janot - law enforcement mother
- Mayra Andrade - mother
- Ralph Martin
- Malayka Fernandes - daughter

== Production and release ==
Niama-FIlm GmbH in Stuttgart produced the film in cooperation with Southwest State Radio, ARTE and the Bayerischer Rundfunk. It was filmed in Stuttgart and Kehl. It was shown at a German film festival on October 27, 2010. The film later aired on ARTE network on 19 December.

== Nomination ==
On December 11, 2011, two German films Raju, directed by Max Zähle and Das Rauschen des Meeres were submitted to be one of the around a hundred films to be selected as a nomination for Best Live Action Short Film. On January 24, 2012, AMPAS chose to nominate the film Raju as a candidate for an Oscar for Best Live Action Short Film.
