= Time Freak =

Time Freak may refer to:

- Time Freak (2011 film), a short comedy film
- Time Freak (2018 film), an American science-fiction comedy-drama film, based on the above
