= Gigi Causey =

American film and television producer

- Occupations: Film producer Television producer Production supervisor Manager
- Spouse: Andrew Bowler

Gigi Causey is an American film and television producer, production supervisor, and manager who resides in Los Angeles. On January 24, 2012, Causey was nominated for the 2012 Academy Award for Best Live Action Short Film for Time Freak which she produced. Causey is married to filmmaker Andrew Bowler, who was also nominated for an Academy Award for the film Time Freak.

== Filmography ==
Producer

Film

- If I Didn't Care (2007)
- Time Freak (2011)

Television

- Queer Eye (1 episode, 2006)
- The Detonators (11 episodes, 2009)

Production supervisor

Film

- Keane (2004)
- The Lucky Ones (2008)
- Nick and Norah's Infinite Playlist (2008)
- May the Best Man Win (2009)
- Brooklyn to Manhattan (2010)
- Vamps (2012)
- Safe House (2012)

Television

- All Worked Up (6 episodes, 2009)
- Arctic Roughnecks (2009)

Production manager

Film

- Before It Had a Name (2005)

Television

- Queer Eye (2003)
- Knock First (2003)
- Home Delivery (2004)
- Beer League (2006)

Production designer

Film

- Sanity (1998)
- Olympia (1998)
- Trespasses (1999)

== Recognition ==
=== Awards and nominations ===
- 2012, nominated for Academy Award, 'Best Short Film, Live Action' for Time Freak
- 2011, won festival prize for 'Best Short' at Route 66 Film Festival for Time Freak
- 2011, won Jury Award for 'Best Short' at Stony Brook Film Festival for Time Freak
- 2011, nominated for Jury Award for 'Best Short Film' at Omaha Film Festival for Time Freak
