= The Barber of Birmingham =

The Barber of Birmingham: Foot Soldier of the Civil Rights Movement
- Directed by: Gail Dolgin; Robin Fryday
- Produced by: Gail Dolgin; Wendy Ettinger; Robin Fryday; Abby Ginzberg; Judith Helfand; Joslyn Rose Lyons
- Cinematography: Vicente Franco; Ashley James; Allen Rosen
- Edited by: Kim Roberts, Jacob Steingroot
- Distributed by: The Video Project (educational)
- Release date: January 2011 (Sundance)
- Running time: 25 minutes
- Country: United States
- Language: English

The Barber of Birmingham: Foot Soldier of the Civil Rights Movement is a 2011 documentary film about James Armstrong, one of the unsung heroes of the Civil Rights Movement.

== Summary ==
A World War II veteran and an original flag bearer for the 1965 Selma to Montgomery marches, Armstrong has run a voter education program out of his barbershop in Birmingham, Alabama for 50 years. The film was co-directed and produced by Gail Dolgin and Robin Fryday.

== Accolades ==
It premiered at the 2011 Sundance Film Festival, three months after Dolgin's death in October 2010 from breast cancer. It was named best short documentary at the Ashland Independent Film Festival. The film was nominated for the Academy Award for Best Documentary (Short Subject) at the 84th Academy Awards. It later aired on television on the PBS series POV.

== See also ==
- Civil rights movement in popular culture
