= Vanessa Vo =

Vietnamese musician

Vanessa Vo Võ Vân Ánh
- Vanessa Vo performing in 2017

Background information
- Also known as: Vân Ánh Võ
- Origin: Hanoi, Vietnam
- Occupation: Musician
- Instrument: Đàn tranh

Võ Vân Ánh, also known by the English name order Vân Ánh Võ and the stage name Vanessa Vo, is a California-based Vietnamese musician best known for her work on the đàn tranh.

In 1995, Vo won the Vietnam National Đàn Tranh Championship. She has written music for the soundtracks to the films Daughter from Danang (2002), Bolinao 52 (2007), The People vs. Agent Orange (2021), as well as the opera Mỹ Lai (2022).

Her debut studio album, She's Not She, was released in 2010. She followed it with Three-Mountain Pass in 2013, a collaboration with Kronos Quartet.
