= Daughter from Danang =

2002 American documentary film by Gail Dolgin and Vicente Franco

Daughter from Đà Nẵng
- DVD cover
- Directed by: Gail Dolgin; Vicente Franco
- Produced by: Gail Dolgin; Sunshine Sara Ludder (associate producer)
- Starring: Heidi Bub; Mai Thi Kim; Tran Tuong Nhu
- Cinematography: Vicente Franco
- Edited by: Kim Roberts
- Music by: B. Quincy Griffin; Hector Perez; Vanessa Vo
- Production companies: Interfaze Educational Productions in association with American Experience and the National Asian-American Telecommunications Association (NAATA)
- Distributed by: Balcony Releasing; PBS Home Video (US DVD)
- Release dates: January 11, 2002 (Sundance); November 1, 2002 (NYC)
- Running time: 83 minutes
- Country: United States
- Languages: English; Vietnamese

Daughter from Đà Nẵng is a 2002 documentary film about an Amerasian, Heidi Bub, meeting her biological family in Da Nang, decades after being brought to the United States in 1975 during Operation Babylift at the end of the Vietnam War.

== Plot ==
Heidi Neville Bub was born on December 10, 1968, in Da Nang as Mai Thi Hiep. Her mother, Mai Thi Kim, already had three children and was estranged from her husband Do Huu Vinh, who had left her to fight with the Viet Cong. She was working at an American military base where she met Heidi's father, an American serviceman. When the North Vietnamese army came closer to Da Nang, Mai Thi Kim feared for Heidi's safety due to rumors of retaliation against mixed-race children. At the age of six, Heidi was sent to the United States and placed in an orphanage run by the Holt Adoption Agency.

Heidi was soon adopted by Ann Neville, a single and strictly religious American woman who renamed her Heidi. They spent a year in Columbia, South Carolina, before permanently settling in Pulaski, Tennessee.

Neville told Heidi that her parents had died in the war, and not to tell anyone she'd been born out of wedlock. She was also instructed to tell people she had been born in the US and not Vietnam, and that she was fully white and not biracial. As Heidi got older, Neville did not want her to date or have friends. After Heidi's freshman year of college, she returned home to find all of her belongings packed up outside. Neville told Heidi to never come back and that she no longer had a daughter. It is revealed at the start of the documentary that Heidi has remained estranged from her adoptive mother.

Heidi is now married and has two young daughters of her own, but the rejection from her adoptive mother is still painful. She hopes that meeting her biological mother might help heal that pain. Heidi contacts the Holt Adoption Agency, and learns that her biological mother, Mai Thi Kim, sent them a letter in 1991 asking about Heidi's whereabouts. The agency had forwarded this information to Ann Neville, who subsequently ignored it and never told Heidi. Now that she knows her biological mother was trying to find her, Heidi decides to return to Vietnam, assisted by journalist Tran Tuong Nhu.

Upon meeting, Mai Thi and Heidi hug and cry tears of joy, but this reunion soon gives way to culture shock. Heidi has no prior knowledge of Vietnamese customs, food, language or culture. Mai Thi expects to spend every moment with Heidi, even sleeping beside her at night. Her other family members constantly want to touch or hug her. This rattles Heidi, as she grew up in a home with little affection. She is uncomfortable among the crowded conditions in the markets she visits with Mai Thi. The unrelenting invasion of her personal space makes Heidi feel suffocated and overwhelmed.

She also discovers that her family lives in abject poverty, and they have been taking care of Mai Thi for years. Heidi's half-brother is the head of the family, and informs her that it is now her turn to care for their mother. Mai Thi tells Heidi that she wants to live the rest of her life in America with her. Heidi is shaken by this unexpected request, and replies that taking Mai Thi to America is not feasible.

Her half-brother then tells Heidi that if she cannot take Mai Thi with her, they will expect Heidi to send them money regularly. Heidi is shocked and walks out of their home in tears. Given their cultural differences, her family does not understand why their requests upset her, and one relative remarks that Heidi cries too much. Heidi's guide explains to her that it is common for Vietnamese nationals in America to provide money for their families remaining in Vietnam. Heidi maintains that she barely knows her Vietnamese family, and feels she is being exploited. She decides to return to America ahead of schedule, feeling more emotional conflict than ever before.

Months after Heidi's visit, she says she occasionally gets letters from her family in Vietnam, but they are all requests for money. She has not replied to their letters.

As of mid-2012, Heidi has had no further contact with her Vietnamese family.

== Reception ==
=== Critical response ===
Metacritic assigned the film a weighted average score of 77 out of 100, based on 16 critics, indicating "generally favorable" reviews.

=== Awards ===
The film won the Grand Jury Prize for Documentary at the Sundance Film Festival and was nominated for an Academy Award for Best Documentary Feature.

== Film festival awards ==
- 2002 Sundance Film Festival, Grand Jury Prize Best Documentary
- San Francisco International Film Festival, Golden Gate Award Grand Prize, Best Bay Area Documentary
- Ojai Film Festival, Best Documentary Feature
- Durango (Colorado) Film Festival, Filmmakers Award
- 2002 Texas Film Festival, Best Documentary and Audience Choice Award
- New Jersey International Film Festival, Best Documentary
- Nashville International Film Festival, Honorable Mention - Best Documentary
- Cleveland International Film Festival, Runner Up - Best Film

Preceded by Southern Comfort	Sundance Grand Jury Prize: Documentary; 2002	Succeeded by Capturing the Friedmans
