= Dovgun =

Dovgun (Cyrillic: Довгун), also transliterated Dovhun, or Dolgun, is a Slavic surname. Notable people with the surname include:

- Alexander Dolgun (1926–1986), American gulag survivor
- Olga Dovgun (born 1970), Kazakhstani sports shooter
- Vitaliy Dovgun (born 1971), Kazakhstani sport shooter

== See also ==
- L-vocalization
- Dovhan
- Dolgin
