= Time Freak (2018 film) =

2018 film by Andrew Bowler

- Theatrical release poster
- Directed by: Andrew Bowler
- Written by: Andrew Bowler
- Produced by: Raymond Mansfield; Matthew Rhodes
- Starring: Asa Butterfield; Sophie Turner; Skyler Gisondo; Will Peltz; Aubrey Reynolds
- Cinematography: Luke Geissbühler
- Edited by: Keith Brachmann
- Music by: Andrew Lockington
- Production companies: QC Entertainment; Rhodes Entertainment; Beach Pictures
- Distributed by: Lionsgate
- Release date: November 9, 2018
- Running time: 104 minutes
- Country: United States
- Language: English
- Box office: $467,705

Time Freak (also known as Time After Time) is a 2018 American science-fiction comedy-drama film written and directed by Andrew Bowler. It was released in limited release and on digital on November 9, 2018. The film is based on a short film of the same name, directed by Bowler in 2011.

== Plot ==
Stilman, a physics student and genius, is dumped by his girlfriend and attempts to find what caused her unhappiness and the break-up itself. Stilman and his best friend Evan look over their relationship and sort different days into happy and bad memories which may or may not have caused Debbie to break up with Stilman.

In the midst of the break-up, Stilman finally figures out how to create a time machine. Stilman and Evan travel back in time to the day Stilman and Debbie met. Stilman plans on doing things differently and will know if the plan worked if the last text Debbie sent disappears. Evan and Stilman then travel to a movie date with Evan, Stilman, Debbie, Carly, and Ryan. Stilman shows them his favorite movie but they do not appreciate it and mock the movie. Stilman becomes upset and insults Carly. They go back in time repeatedly as the situation goes wrong. Finally, Stilman works the situation the way he wants in which Debbie looks at him lovingly. Later, they sit at Evan's house where Evan attempts to leave a message for his future self so that he does not flunk out and he can graduate.

They go to another location in a building where there is supposed to be a party. Evan gets in an elevator while Debbie and Stilman take the stairs to the roof, but there is no party and nobody else. The door closes behind them and they are locked out, Debbie begins to panic but Stilman unlocks the door easily, leaving Debbie impressed.

Stilman relives a moment over and over and they revisit it many other times trying to stop the break-up. Evan meets a girl and the machine freezes leaving the two stuck. Later, Stilman admits to Debbie his dislike of Ryan.

The time machine is eventually fixed but it only allows forward time travel. Hence, Stilman has to get everything right. Stilman and Debbie go to a camp party where Stilman is able to keep Debbie happy. Upon waking up the next day, Stilman finds that the text has disappeared and Debbie no longer breaks up with him. Evan and Stilman return to the present time.

Stilman calls Debbie and goes over to her apartment where they have sex. They plan a birthday dinner for Stilman. Debbie is over an hour late for the dinner and their table is given away when Stilman gets upset. They make up and go to a waffle place. Stilman feels bad about getting mad despite it being her fault. Evan is upset about the small amount of change that has come to his life. Later, Debbie texts Stilman saying they should talk again. Stilman begins working on the time machine again.

Two years later, Debbie and Stilman are married and having dinner with their friends including Evan and his new girlfriend. Debbie has a recording set up for a new album, she reveals she does not really care about it and is less inclined to be a musician. Debbie brings up the fact that they never fight or disagree about anything.

Stilman sees Evan being addicted to using the machine and that it was making their life too perfect and Debbie unhappy.

Debbie suggests having a baby to be happy again. In the morning, he kisses Debbie and then Evan comes and asks him not to destroy the time machine. Evan reveals he uses it often and Stilman locks him out, but Debbie lets him in again. They both fight each other and Debbie becomes upset when she finds the time machine. Stilman explains what he is going to do and Evan jumps in. They go back to the first day Debbie and Stilman met and Evan chases him with his car to ensure he comes up with the theorem for the time machine. Stilman reveals they cannot go back as his phone is not hooked up. Stilman kisses Debbie and then begins to leave her. Her consciousness from the future comes back and they begin to argue but eventually make up.

== Cast ==
- Asa Butterfield as Stillman
- Sophie Turner as Debbie
- Skyler Gisondo as Evan
- Will Peltz as Ryan
- Aubrey Reynolds as Blue Ribbons
- Mary Elizabeth Boylan as Sophia
- Jillian Joy as Carly
- Marilyn Miller as Meditator / Dining Patron / Party Guest
- Mark Blockovich as Diner Patron

== Production ==
The movie was filmed in Utah.

== Reception ==
=== Box office ===
Time Freak grossed $10,003 in the United States and Canada and $506,081 in other territories for a worldwide total of $516,084, plus $62,108 with home video sales.
