= Ana Rocha Fernandes =

Cape Verdean director, screenwriter and film editor

- Education: studied architecture at the University of Siegen. Studied film at the Film Academy Baden-Württemberg
- Awards: Das Rauschen des Meeres. Best Short Film, Baden-Württembergischer Filmpreis [de] 2010[3]. Jury Prize, Cape Verde Film Festival 2011[3]. Rabelados – die gewaltlosen Rebellen der Kapverdischen Inseln Honorable mention at the Locarno International Film Festival[3]. Best Film / Press Prize, Festival Internacional de Cinema e Vídeo Ambiental [pt] (FICA), Brazil

Ana Rocha Fernandes is a Cape-Verdian film director, screenwriter and editor.

Fernandes was born in Santiago, Cape Verde. She was a teacher in Cape Verde, and then moved to Germany to study architecture at the University of Siegen, before studying film at the Film Academy Baden-Württemberg in Ludwigsburg. She now lives in Stuttgart.

== Selected filmography ==
- Das Rauschen des Meeres (The Sound of the Sea), 2010 short drama
- Vielen Dank für Nichts, 2013
- Rabelados - Die gewaltlosen Rebellen der kapverdischen Inseln (Rabelados - The Non-Violent Rebels of the Cape Verde Islands), 2000 documentary about the Rabelados

== Awards ==
- Das Rauschen des Meeres

- Best Short Film, Baden-Württembergischer Filmpreis 2010
- Jury Prize, Cape Verde Film Festival 2011

- Rabelados – die gewaltlosen Rebellen der Kapverdischen Inseln

- Honorable mention at the Locarno International Film Festival
- Best Film / Press Prize, Festival Internacional de Cinema e Vídeo Ambiental (FICA), Brazil
