= Robin Fryday =

American documentary filmmaker

- Occupation: Documentary filmmaker
- Years active: 2011–present

Robin Fryday is an American documentary filmmaker. She was nominated for an Academy Award in the category Best Documentary for the short film The Barber of Birmingham: Foot Soldier of the Civil Rights Movement.

Fryday is of Jewish descent.

== Selected filmography ==
- The Barber of Birmingham: Foot Soldier of the Civil Rights Movement (2011; co-nominated with Gail Dolgin)
