= Stefan Gieren =

German film producer and writer

- Occupations: Producer, Writer
- Years active: 2010-present

Stefan Gieren is a German film producer and writer. On 24 January 2012 he was nominated for an Academy Award for the film Raju. His nomination was shared with Max Zähle. He received a Student Academy Award twice - in 2011 for the film Raju and in 2016 for the film Ayny. In 2019 he received the German Film Award (Lola) in Gold for his film Fortschritt im Tal der Ahnungslosen.

He co-founded a network of educational TV stations in Afghanistan.

== Filmography (Selection) ==
2011: Raju (Producer, Co-Creator) - Student Academy Award 2011, Academy Awards Nomination 2012

2015: 3 Postcards (Producer, Writer) - Short Tiger Award 2016

2015: Toz Bezi (Producer) - Berlinale Forum 2016

2016: Ayny (Producer) - Student Academy Award 2016

2017: Tian - The Mystery of St. Pauli (Producer, Writer)

2017: Tshweesh (Producer) - Locarno 2017

2018: Whatever Happens Next (Producer) - Berlinale Perspektive 2018

2018: Kardesler (Producer) - Karlovy Vary Official Competition 2018

2019: Fortschritt im Tal der Ahnungslosen (Producer) - Berlinale Forum 2019, German Film Award 2019
