= Janet L. Dolgin =

Janet L. Dolgin is an American legal scholar and Jack and Freda Dicker Distinguished Professor of Health Care Law at Hofstra University.
