= Joslyn Rose Lyons =

American director, filmmaker and executive

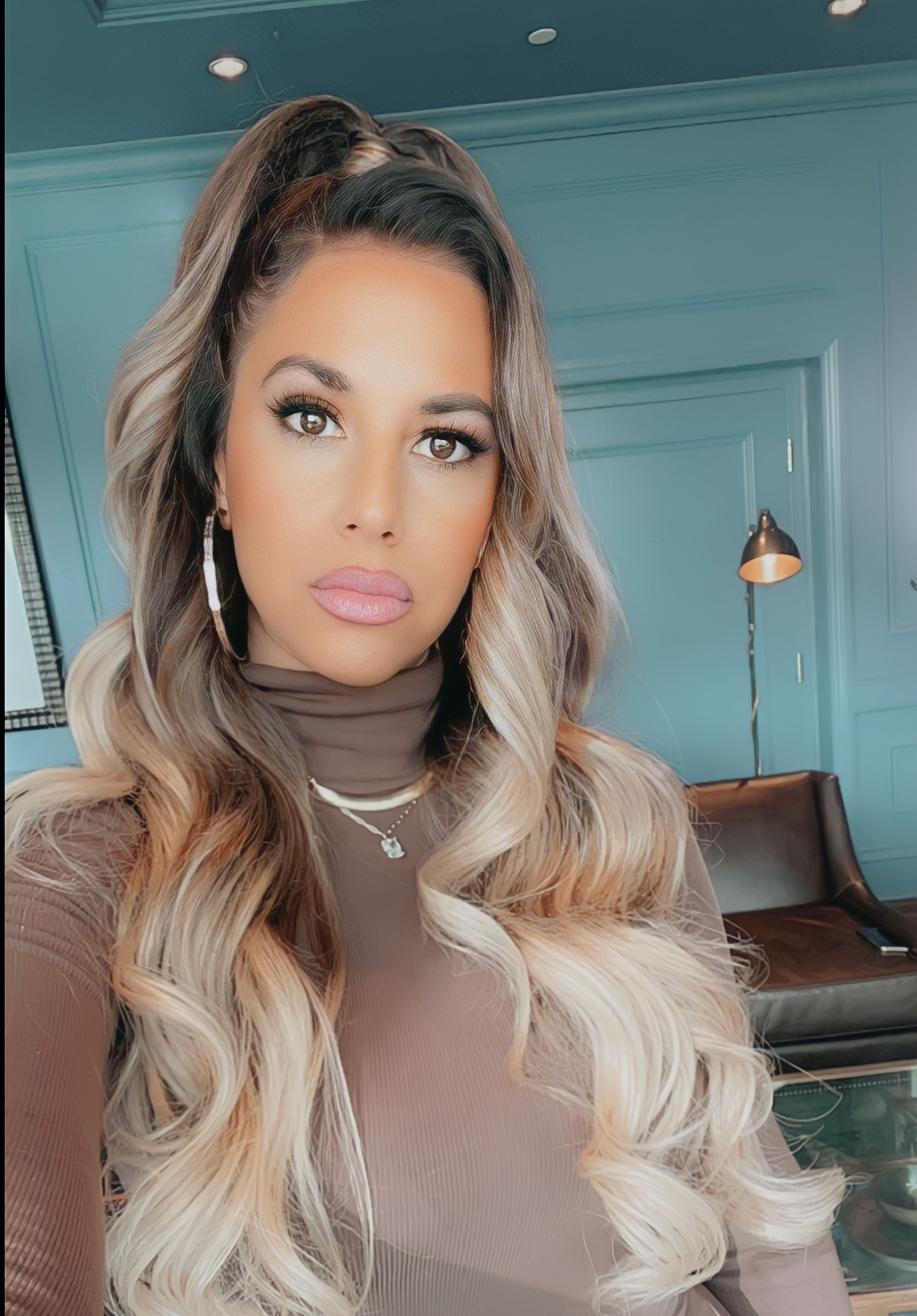
- Lyons in 2023
- Occupations: Director; filmmaker; producer; writer
- Years active: 2003–Present
- Website: joslynrosefilms.com

Joslyn Rose Lyons is an American director, filmmaker, producer, and writer. Her film "Stand" was nominated for a Sports Emmy Award in 2024.

== Career ==
Joslyn Rose Lyons was born in the East Bay of the San Francisco Bay Area. Her mother is an artist, and she began working on film scripts at an early age. Lyons graduated from UC Berkeley with a degree in film theory, and released her first documentary film at the age of 23, titled Soundz of Spirit. The film premiered at the Hip Hop Film Festival in 2003.

Lyons has directed and produced several music videos, such as the videos for Too $hort's 2012 album No Trespassing. She has worked with other hip-hop artists such as Ice Cube and E-40.

Her short film Looking Glass was the winner of Best Short at the American Film Awards. At the 7th LA Independent Women Film Awards, she received the Best Director Award for her short film Butterfly Boxing.

In 2024, her feature-length studio directorial debut "Stand" was nominated for a Sports Emmy Award for Outstanding Long Documentary.

== Filmography ==
- Soundz of Spirit (2003) – director
- Good Vibes (2019) – TV movie, director
- Imagine Justice (2019) – TV short, director and producer
- Looking Glass (2020) – short film, director
- Rap Noir (2020) – director
- Speaking Truth to Power (2020) – producer
- (R)Evolution (2022) – TV episode, director
- Stand (2023) – director
- Butterfly Boxing (2023) – short film, writer and director
- Tale of the Tape (2024) – producer
- The Masquerade (2025) – writer and director
- Shadowbox (TBA) – director

== Awards ==
- Outstanding Documentary Truth to Power NAACP Image Awards
- Best Female Director, TopShorts
