= Kalmon Dolgin =

Real estate developer

- Born: 1943 (age 82–83); Great Neck, New York
- Citizenship: United States
- Education: B.A. Syracuse University; J.D. Syracuse University College of Law
- Occupation: Real estate developer
- Known for: CEO of Kalmon Dolgin Affiliates, Inc.
- Spouse: Margaret Dolgin
- Children: Joshua Dolgin; Brynn Dolgin; Daniel Dolgin
- Parents: Diana Dolgin; Israel Dolgin
- Relatives: Neil Dolgin (brother); Gail Dolgin (sister); Stuart Dolgin (brother)
- Website: Official website

Kalmon Dolgin (born 1943) is a real estate investor and developer based in New York. He serves as the president of Kalmon Dolgin Affiliates, Inc. and is part of the Dolgin family, which has been acknowledged by Real Estate Weekly for their contributions to the New York real estate scene.

== Early life and education ==
Dolgin was born in Great Neck, New York. His parents were Israel and Diana Dolgin, and he had three siblings: Neil Dolgin (born 1953); Dr. Stuart Dolgin (deceased 2001); and filmmaker Gail Dolgin (1945-2010). Dolgin's grandfather, also named Kalmon Dolgin, immigrated from Russia and initially operated a grocery store. In 1904, he founded a real estate brokerage business in Brooklyn called Kalmon Dolgin Affiliates, Inc.

In 1943, Dolgin's father and uncle, Morris Dolgin, expanded the business into property ownership by purchasing a building in Williamsburg, Brooklyn. They eventually built a portfolio consisting mainly of industrial buildings in Brooklyn and Queens.

In the 1960s, Dolgin joined the family business, and in the 1970s, his brother Neil followed suit. The Dolgin brothers expanded the company's operations beyond Brooklyn and Queens, extending their reach to the Bronx, Staten Island, Long Island, Manhattan, New Jersey, Connecticut, and Westchester County, New York.

They acquired several properties, including a $127 million portfolio of seventeen medical office buildings on the East Coast in 2004, a 50% interest in the Falchi Building in Long Island City, Queens for $61 million in 2005, and properties in Philadelphia and its suburbs between 2006 and 2007. Dolgin currently holds the position of president at both Kalmon Dolgin Affiliates, Inc. and KND Management Co., Inc., and serves as Of Counsel at the law firm of Agins, Siegel & Reiner.

As of 2013, the company has three divisions: management, brokerage, and development, and is recognized for converting industrial buildings into commercial and residential spaces.

== Personal life ==
Dolgin is married to Margaret "Peggy" Dolgin, and they have three children: Joshua Dolgin, who represents the fourth generation in the family business; Brynn Dolgin; and Daniel Dolgin. Dolgin supports the Lustgarten Foundation for Pancreatic Cancer Research, which focuses on the illness that claimed his brother's life. His nephew, Grant Dolgin, also works in the family business.
