= Time Freak (2011 film) =

2011 short film directed by Andrew Bowler

- Film poster
- Directed by: Andrew Bowler
- Written by: Andrew Bowler
- Produced by: Gigi Causey; Luke Geissbuhler; Michael McDermott; Geoffrey Richman
- Starring: Michael Nathanson; John Conor Brooke; Emilea Wilson; Hector Diaz
- Cinematography: Luke Geissbuhler
- Edited by: Geoffrey Richman
- Music by: Irv Johnson
- Production company: Team Toad
- Release dates: April 29, 2011 (USA Film Festival); July 4, 2011 (United States)
- Running time: 11 minutes
- Country: United States
- Language: English

Time Freak is a 2011 short comedy film written and directed by Andrew Bowler and starring Michael Nathanson, John Conor Brooke, Emilea Wilson, and Hector Diaz. It was produced by Gigi Causey. The film was nominated for the 2012 Academy Award for Best Live Action Short Film. The time-travel comedy was inspired by other time-travel films such as Primer and Back to the Future.

Bowler and Causey decided to produce the film after they got married, spending the $25,000 they had saved to buy an apartment in New York. The film was rejected by several film festivals, including Sundance, Telluride, and Tribeca, but the couple submitted it to the Academy of Motion Picture Arts and Sciences, which selected the film as a nominee for the award.

The film stars John Conor Brooke, Michael Nathanson and Emilea Wilson. Brooke and Nathanson are roommates, but Nathanson hasn't been home for three days, so Brooke goes to Nathanson's lab in a run down building to check on him. Nathanson has just perfected the time machine he had been working on, but is behaving oddly. It turns out he has been re-doing the events of the day before, trying to perfect his interactions at a dry cleaner and with a woman (Wilson) that he wants to impress.

== Feature-length film ==
Bowler expanded upon his short film to create a full-length feature film, starring Sophie Turner, Asa Butterfield, and Skyler Gisondo. Most of the filming took place in Utah, including Salt Lake City, Taylorsville, and the University of Utah.
