= Raju (film) =

Short film

- Film poster
- Directed by: Max Zähle
- Written by: Florian Kuhn; Max Zähle
- Produced by: Stefan Gieren
- Starring: Wotan Wilke Möhring; Julia Richter; Krish Gupta
- Cinematography: Sin Huh
- Edited by: Max Zähle
- Music by: Florian Tessloff
- Release date: 10 February 2012
- Running time: 24 minutes
- Countries: Germany; India
- Languages: German; English

Raju is a live action short film directed by Max Zähle. It follows a German couple who adopt a little boy who they believe to be an orphan from Calcutta, India. When he goes missing on the second day, they realize that his parents are still alive and that he has been abducted from his family. The story details their dramatic response to the discovery.

== Plot ==
The Caucasian couple Sarah and Jan Fischer travel to Calcutta, India, to adopt a 4-year-old supposedly orphan child, Raju, at a children's home. Formalities require a minimum stay of four days.

On the second day Jan and Raju take a trip to the city. When Jan briefly turns around, Raju goes missing on a market. First, the couple turns to the authorities. While Sarah being ill returns and stays at their hotel, Jan searches the streets on his own.

In the evening not having found Raju, Jan takes a cab back to the hotel. He suddenly spots a boy wearing the same jersey as Raju did. Jan finally catches up with the boy mistaken as Raju at a community center. The manager offers the community organization's help in finding Raju, too. While in a different room the manager is sending out their missing person report to cooperating organizations, Jan casually browses a paper folder of reports. He recognizes the picture of a girl he saw at the children's home. Surprised, he browses the folder more carefully and finds out that Raju has been reported missing before, meaning that Raju is in fact not an orphan.

In the same night Jan heads back to the children's home and challenges the manager. She dares him to incriminate himself when he reports the police that they attempted to adopt a kidnapped child.

The police finds and returns Raju to the Fischer family, yet now Sarah and Jan are struggling and arguing about the ethical implications of their action. The next morning, before Sarah wakes up, Jan unilaterally decides to bring back Raju to his parents.

== Style ==
Pictures were shot almost exclusively hand-held. Initially, the cut pace is rather fast (≤ 4 seconds) underscoring a certain degree of excitement, whereas chronologically late narration elements are depicted with long (≥ 10 seconds) setups.

Occasional jump cuts emphasize Jan's restlessness or moral struggle. Jan's decision to ultimately return Raju to his parents is shown in a flashforward at the beginning of the movie. The circumstance that Jan recognizes a girl from the children's home in the missing reports folder is conveyed with a flashback.

== Production ==
Media reports on the New Life Children's Refuge case inspired Zähle's research on the topic.

The movie is Zähle's, Huh's and Gieren's graduation movie, each of them in a different discipline. 20 minutes (excluding credits) are the maximum allowed length.

Principal photography took 10 days.

== Accolades ==
The film was nominated for the 2012 Academy Award for Best Live Action Short Film.
