= Andrew Bowler =

American filmmaker

- Education: Tisch School of the Arts
- Occupation: Filmmaker

Andrew Bowler is an American filmmaker. On January 24, 2012, he was nominated for an Academy Award for the short film Time Freak. In 2018, he made it a feature-length film. Bowler graduated from the Tisch School of the Arts of New York University in 1996.

== Filmography ==
Year	Title	Credited as	Notes
1995	The Raven	Writer and director	Short film
2002	The Descent of Walter McFea	Writer, director, and actor	
2011	Time Freak	Writer and director	Short film
2013	Karen Returns Something to Scott	Writer and actor	Short film
2018	Time Freak	Writer and director	Feature based on 2011 short
