= Gail Dolgin =

American film director

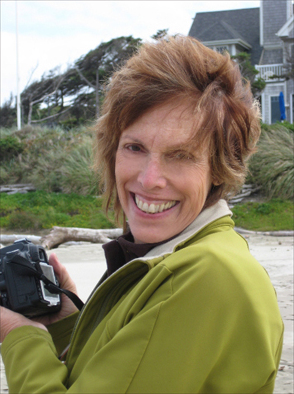
- Born: April 4, 1945; Great Neck, New York, U.S.
- Died: October 7, 2010 (aged 65); Berkeley, California, U.S.
- Occupation: American documentary filmmaker
- Spouse: Jairo Leclaire
- Children: Amelia Leclaire Nardinelli
- Parent(s): Diana Dolgin; Israel Dolgin
- Family: Kalmon Dolgin (brother); Neil Dolgin (brother); Stuart Dolgin (brother)

Gail Dolgin (/ˈdɑːldʒɪn/; April 4, 1945 – October 7, 2010) was an American filmmaker. She was nominated for the Academy Award for Daughter from Danang, and The Barber of Birmingham. Daughter from Danang also won the Sundance Grand Jury Prize for Best Documentary.

== Life and career ==
Dolgin was born to a Jewish family in Brooklyn the daughter of Israel and Diana Dolgin. She had three brothers: Kalmon Dolgin, Neil Dolgin, and Stuart Dolgin (deceased). Her grandfather Kalmon Dolgin founded a New York-based real estate brokerage firm which her father and uncle expanded into real estate development. It is now known as Kalmon Dolgin Affiliates, Inc. and run by her two brothers. She was raised in Great Neck, New York and earned a bachelor's degree in art history from the University of Pennsylvania and a master's in education from the University of Oregon. Interested in photography, she joined Newsreel, an activist film collective in New York, where she decided to pursue filmmaking professionally. In addition to Daughter From Danang, Dolgin's notable credits include Cuba Va about Cuban youth after the revolution, and Summer of Love, about San Francisco in the summer of 1967. She also collaborated filmmaker Vicente Franco on films.

Her final project, a documentary film project on one of the unsung figures of the civil rights movement entitled The Barber of Birmingham was completed posthumously, co-directed and produced with still photographer Robin Fryday. The film premiered at the 2011 Sundance Film Festival, three months after Dolgin's death, and was nominated for an Academy Award in 2012.

Dolgin was a mentor to Bay Area filmmakers, hosting monthly gatherings at her home in Berkeley, California to watch and discuss films with their directors via speakerphone, and served as a judge, board member and reviewer with the Sundance Film Festival, Independent Television Service, Berkeley Film Foundation and San Francisco Jewish Film Festival.

Dolgin died in 2010, aged 65, following a 10-year battle with breast cancer. She was candid about her illness, speaking about it during her 2002 acceptance speech at the Sundance Film Festival for Daughter from Danang and describing how she had found the courage to continue making films. She had one daughter, Amelia Nardinelli.
