= Max Zähle =

German filmmaker

- Occupation: Filmmaker

Max Zähle is a German filmmaker. On 24 January 2012, he was nominated for an Academy Award for the film Raju.
