= Her Master's Voice (disambiguation) =

Her Master's Voice is a 1936 film directed by Joseph Santley.

Her Master's Voice may also refer to:

- Her Master's Voice (play), a 1933 Broadway play by Clare Kummer
- Her Master's Voice (2012 film), a 2012 documentary film directed by Nina Conti
