= Alan Mowbray =

British-American actor (1896–1969)

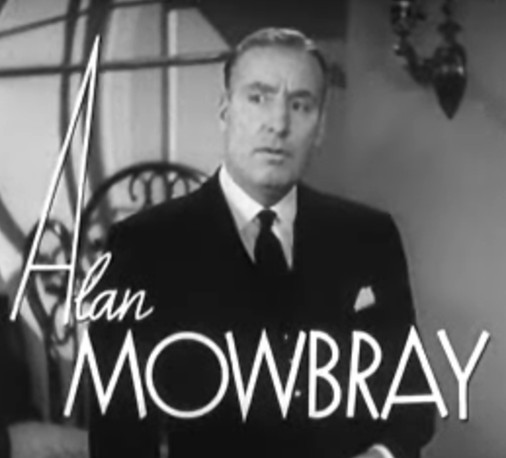
- Trailer for Topper Takes a Trip (1939)
- Born: Alfred Ernest Allen; 18 August 1896; London, England
- Died: 25 March 1969 (aged 72); Hollywood, California, U.S.
- Resting place: Holy Cross Cemetery, Culver City
- Occupation: Actor
- Years active: 1922–1969
- Spouse: Lorraine Carpenter (m. 1927)
- Children: 2

Alan Mowbray MM (born Alfred Ernest Allen; 18 August 1896 – 25 March 1969) was an English stage and film actor who found success in Hollywood.

== Early life ==
Mowbray was born in London, England. He served with distinction in the British Army in World War I, being awarded the Military Medal and the French Croix de Guerre for bravery in action. He applied for transfer to the Royal Air Force, which was granted just six days before the war ended. This placed him in London on Armistice Day. His service came to an end when the Royal Air Force wanted another seven years from him.

== Career ==
Mowbray began his stage career in London in 1922 as an actor and stage manager. In 1923 he arrived in the United States and was soon acting with New York stock companies. He debuted on Broadway in The Sport of Kings (1926); in 1929 he wrote, directed and starred in the unsuccessful Dinner Is Served.

Mowbray made his film debut in God's Gift to Women (1931) playing a butler, a role in which he was thereafter often cast. In a contemporary pulp magazine story, Raymond Chandler lampooned Mowbray's distinctive clipped speech in these roles: a butler is described as having "a wing collar and an accent like Alan Mowbray." More than sixty years later, in Julian Fellowes' Gosford Park (2001) the fictitious Hollywood film producer spending a weekend in an English country house tells an associate on a transatlantic telephone call that Alan Mowbray would be a good casting choice as a butler for a proposed Charlie Chan movie set in England, then goes on to say "These people here look like Alan Mowbray. I mean, they're sort of tall, and they don't say too much. And they have fucking British accents, right?"

Mowbray appeared in five more pictures in 1931, notably portraying George Washington in Alexander Hamilton. In 1935, he played one of the male leads in Becky Sharp, the first feature-length film in full-colour Technicolor, as well as playing the lead in the farcical Night Life of the Gods, based on a Thorne Smith novel. It was for another Thorne Smith–derived film, Topper (1937), that Mowbray may be best remembered; he played Topper's butler Wilkins, a role he reprised the following year in Topper Takes a Trip. Throughout the 1930s and 1940s, Mowbray worked steadily, appearing in over 120 films, including the Oscar-nominated My Man Godfrey (1936), That Hamilton Woman (1941), and John Ford's My Darling Clementine (1946).

In the 1950s, Mowbray's film roles decreased and he began to appear on television. He played the title role in the DuMont TV series Colonel Humphrey Flack, which first aired in 1953–54 and was revived in 1958–59. In the 1954–55 television season, Mowbray played Mr. Swift, the drama coach of the character Mickey Mulligan, in NBC's short-lived The Mickey Rooney Show: Hey, Mulligan. He portrayed the character Stewart Styles, a maitre d with a checkered past in the 1960-1961 adventure/drama series Dante, reprising a role he had originally played in several episodes of Four Star Theatre. Mowbray appeared in the titular role as a crooked astrologer in the 1959 episode "The Misfortune Teller" of the Maverick television series starring James Garner and Kathleen Crowley, and as Cranshaw in the episode "Quite a Woman" of the 1961 series The Investigators starring James Franciscus.

In 1956, Mowbray appeared in three major films, The King and I, The Man Who Knew Too Much and Around the World in 80 Days. His final film role was as Captain Norcross in A Majority of One in 1961. In 1963, he returned to Broadway in the successful comedy Enter Laughing, playing Marlowe, the unscrupulous mentor to David Kolowitz (played by Alan Arkin).

Mowbray was a founding member of the Screen Actors Guild in 1933, writing a personal check to fund the group's incorporation and serving as the first vice president.

== Personal life and death ==
Mowbray married Lorraine Carpenter in 1927. Together they had two children, including daughter Patricia, who, at age 28, married her father's friend, 70-year-old Canadian actor Douglass Dumbrille, in 1960.

Unusually for a Hollywood star, Mowbray was less of a fan of seeing himself on the screen, but enjoyed working behind the scenes. In addition to helping found the Screen Actors Guild, he was among the founders of the Hollywood Cricket Club. He was a prominent early member of the Masquers Club, and donated to the group's long-time clubhouse at 1765 N. Sycamore Street in Hollywood. He also was a founder of the British United Services Club, a club for ex British Military members in Hollywood that met at the Masquers.

Mowbray cooperated heavily with the FBI in the investigation of Japanese spy Frederick Rutland, keeping it secret for the rest of his life, even though he ironically played a spy in the original The Man from U.N.C.L.E.

Mowbray died of a heart attack in 1969 in Hollywood, survived by his wife and children. His body is interred in the Holy Cross Cemetery in Culver City, California.

== Filmography ==
Year	Film	Role	Director	Notes
1931	God's Gift to Women	Auguste, Toto's Butler	Michael Curtiz	
1931	The Man in Possession	Sir Charles Cartwright	Sam Wood (uncredited)	
1931	Guilty Hands	Gordon Rich	Lionel Barrymore	
1931	Alexander Hamilton	George Washington	John G. Adolfi	
1931	Left Over Ladies	Jerry	Erle C. Kenton	
1931	Honor of the Family	Tony Revere	Lloyd Bacon	
1931	Nice Women	Mark Chandler	Edwin H. Knopf	
1932	Lovers Courageous	Lamone	Robert Z. Leonard	
1932	The Silent Witness	Arthur Drinton	Marcel Varnel	
1932	Hotel Continental	Walter Underwood	Christy Cabanne	
1932	The World and the Flesh	Dimitri	John Cromwell	
1932	Man About Town	Ivan Boris	John Francis Dillon	
1932	The Man from Yesterday	Dr. Waite	Berthold Viertel	
1932	Winner Take All	the Etiquette Teacher	Roy Del Ruth	
1932	The Man Called Back	King's Counsel	Robert Florey	
1932	Jewel Robbery	Detective Fritz	William Dieterle	
1932	Two Against the World	George 'Georgie' Walton	Archie Mayo	
1932	The Phantom President	George Washington	Norman Taurog	uncredited
1932	Sherlock Holmes	Colonel Gore-King	William K. Howard	
1933	Our Betters	Lord George Grayston	George Cukor	
1933	A Study in Scarlet	Inspector Lastrade	Edwin L. Marin	
1933	Peg o' My Heart	Capt. Christopher 'Chris' Brent	Robert Z. Leonard (uncredited)	
1933	The Midnight Club	Arthur Bradley	Alexander Hall, George Somnes	
1933	Voltaire	Count De Sarnac	John G. Adolfi	
1933	Berkeley Square	Major Clinton	Frank Lloyd	
1933	The World Changes	Sir Phillip Ivor	Mervyn LeRoy	
1933	Roman Scandals	Majordomo	Frank Tuttle	
1933	Her Secret	Nils Norton	Warren Millais	
1934	Long Lost Father	Sir Tony Gelding	Ernest B. Schoedsack	
1934	The House of Rothschild	Prince Metternich	Alfred L. Werker	
1934	Where Sinners Meet	Nicholas	J. Walter Ruben	
1934	Little Man, What Now?	Franz Schluter	Frank Borzage	
1934	Cheaters	Paul Southern	Phil Rosen	
1934	The Girl from Missouri	Lord Douglas	Jack Conway	
1934	One More River	Forsythe	James Whale	
1934	Embarrassing Moments	Aheam	Edward Laemmle	
1934	Charlie Chan in London	Geoffrey Richmond	Eugene Forde	
1935	Night Life of the Gods	Hunter Hawk	Lowell Sherman	
1935	Becky Sharp	Rawdon Crawley	Rouben Mamoulian	
1935	Lady Tubbs	Elyot Wembsleigh	Alan Crosland	
1935	The Gay Deception	Lord Clewe	William Wyler	
1935	She Couldn't Take It	Alan Bartlett	Tay Garnett	
1935	In Person	Jay Holmes	James Anderson	
1936	Rose-Marie	Premier	W. S. Van Dyke	
1936	Muss 'em Up	Paul Harding	Charles Vidor	
1936	Give Us This Night	Forcellini	Alexander Hall	
1936	Desire	Dr. Maurice Pauquet	Frank Borzage	
1936	The Case Against Mrs. Ames	Lawrence Waterson	William A. Seiter	
1936	Fatal Lady	Uberto Malla	Edward Ludwig	
1936	Mary of Scotland	Throckmorton	John Ford	
1936	My Man Godfrey	Tommy Gray	Gregory La Cava	
1936	Ladies in Love	Paul Sandor	Edward H. Griffith	
1936	Four Days' Wonder	Archibald Fenton	Sidney Salkow	
1936	Rainbow on the River	Ralph Layton	George Sherman	
1937	On the Avenue	Frederick Sims	William Seiter (fill-in)	
1937	The King and the Chorus Girl	Donald Taylor	Mervyn LeRoy	
1937	As Good as Married	Wally	Edward Buzzell	
1937	Marry the Girl	Dr. Hayden Stryker	William C. McGann	
1937	Topper	Wilkins	Norman Z. McLeod	
1937	Walter Wanger's Vogues of 1938	Henry Morgan	Charles Kerr	
1937	On Such a Night	Professor Ricardo Montrose Candle	Ewald André Dupont	
1937	Music for Madame	Leon Rodowsky	John G. Blystone	
1937	Stand-In	Koslofski	Tay Garnett	
1937	Hollywood Hotel	Alexander Duprey	Busby Berkeley	
1938	Merrily We Live	Butler	Norman Z. McLeod	
1938	There Goes My Heart	Pennypepper E. Pennypepper	Norman Z. McLeod	
1938	Topper Takes a Trip	Wilkins	Norman Z. McLeod	
1939	Never Say Die	Prince Smirnov	Elliott Nugent	
1939	Way Down South	Jacques Bouton	Bernard Vorhaus	
1939	The Llano Kid	John Travers	Edward Venturini	
1940	Music in My Heart	Charles Gardner	Joseph Santley	
1940	Curtain Call	Donald Avery	Frank Woodruff	
1940	Scatterbrain	J.R. Russell	Gus Meins	
1940	The Boys from Syracuse	Angelo	A. Edward Sutherland	
1940	The Villain Still Pursued Her	Silas Cribbs	Edward F. Cline	
1940	The Quarterback	Professor Hobbs	H. Bruce Humberstone	
1941	Footlight Fever	Mr. Don Avery	Irving Reis	
1941	That Hamilton Woman	Sir William Hamilton	Alexander Korda	
1941	That Uncertain Feeling	Dr. Vengard	Ernst Lubitsch	
1941	The Cowboy and the Blonde	Phineas Johnson	Ray McCarey	
1941	Ice-Capades	Pete Ellis	Joseph Santley	
1941	Moon Over Her Shoulder	Grover Sloan	Alfred L. Werker	
1941	I Wake Up Screaming	Robin Ray	H. Bruce Humberstone	
1941	The Perfect Snob	Freddie Browning	Ray McCarey	
1942	Yokel Boy	Movie Producer	Joseph Santley	
1942	We Were Dancing	Grand Duke Basil	Robert Z. Leonard	
1942	The Mad Martindales	Hugo Martindale	Alfred L. Werker	
1942	Panama Hattie	Jay Jerkins, Dick's Butler	Norman Z. McLeod	
1942	A Yank at Eton	Mr. Duncan	Norman Taurog	
1942	Isle of Missing Men	Dr. Henry Brown	Richard Oswald	
1942	The Devil with Hitler	Gesatan	Gordon Douglas	
1943	The Powers Girl	John Robert Powers	Norman Z. McLeod	
1943	Slightly Dangerous	English Gentleman	Buster Keaton	
1943	Stage Door Canteen	Alan Mowbray	Frank Borzage	
1943	So This Is Washington	Chester W. Marshall	Ray McCarey	
1943	Holy Matrimony	Mr. Pennington	John M. Stahl	
1943	His Butler's Sister	Buzz Jenkins	Frank Borzage	
1944	The Doughgirls	Breckenridge Drake	James V. Kern	
1944	Ever Since Venus	J. Webster Hackett	Arthur Dreifuss	
1944	My Gal Loves Music	Rodney Spoonyer	Edward C. Lilley	
1945	Bring on the Girls	August	Sidney Lanfield	
1945	Earl Carroll Vanities	Grand Duke Paul	Joseph Santley	
1945	The Phantom of 42nd Street	Cecil Moore	Albert Herman	
1945	Where Do We Go from Here?	General George Washington	Gregory Ratoff, George Seaton	
1945	Tell It to a Star	Colonel Ambrose Morgan	Frank McDonald	
1945	Men in Her Diary	Douglas Crane	Charles Barton	
1945	Sunbonnet Sue	Jonathan	Ralph Murphy	
1946	Terror by Night	Major Duncan-Bleek	Roy William Neill	
1946	Idea Girl	J.C. Crow	Will Jason	
1946	My Darling Clementine	Granville Thorndyke	John Ford	
1947	The Pilgrim Lady	Clifford Latimer	Lesley Selander	
1947	Lured	Lyle Maxwell	Douglas Sirk	
1947	Merton of the Movies	Frank Mulvaney	Robert Alton	
1947	Captain from Castile	Prof. Botello	Henry King	
1948	The Main Street Kid	The Great Martine	R. G. Springsteen	
1948	The Prince of Thieves	The Friar	Howard Bretherton	
1948	An Innocent Affair	Ken St. Clair	Lloyd Bacon	
1948	My Dear Secretary	Deveny	Charles Martin	
1948	Every Girl Should Be Married	Mr. Spitzer	Don Hartman	
1949	The Lone Wolf and His Lady	Jamison, Lanyard's Valet	John Hoffman	
1949	The Lovable Cheat	Justin	Richard Oswald	
1949	You're My Everything	Joe Blanton	Walter Lang	
1949	Abbott and Costello Meet the Killer, Boris Karloff	Melton	Charles Barton	
1950	Wagon Master	Dr. A. Locksley Hall	John Ford	
1950	The Jackpot	Leslie	Walter Lang	
1951	Dick Turpin's Ride	Lord Charles Willoughby	Ralph Murphy	
1951	Crosswinds	Sir Cecil Daubrey	Lewis R. Foster	
1952	Just Across the Street	Davis	Joseph Pevney	
1952	Androcles and the Lion	Editor of Gladiators	Chester Erskine, Edward Killy (uncredited)	
1952	Blackbeard the Pirate	Noll	Raoul Walsh	
1954	Ma and Pa Kettle at Home	Alphonsus Mannering	Charles Lamont	
1954	The Steel Cage	Lee Filbert	Walter Doniger	segment "The Chef"
1955	The King's Thief	Sir Gilbert Talbot	Robert Z. Leonard, Hugo Fregonese (uncredited)	
1956	The Man Who Knew Too Much	Val Parnell	Alfred Hitchcock	
1956	The King and I	Sir John Hay	Walter Lang	
1956	Around the World in 80 Days	the British Consul at Suez	Michael Anderson	
1956	Once Upon a Honeymoon	Gordon	Gower Champion	Short
1961	A Majority of One	Captain Norcross	Mervyn LeRoy	

== TV appearances ==
- Four Star Playhouse in Dick Powell's episode "The House Always Wins" (1955)
- Whispering Smith, in the "Poet and Peasant Case" episode (1960)
- Maverick with James Garner and Kathleen Crowley, in "The Misfortune Teller" episode as Luke Abigor (1960)
- The Investigators with James Franciscus and James Philbrook, in the episode "Quite a Woman" as Cranshaw
- The Patty Duke Show, as Strassman, the director of the high school play in which both Patty and Cathy appeared (1963)
- The Beverly Hillbillies, in the episode "A Bundle for Britain" as Montrose, hired by Mr Drysdale to pretend to be the Queen of England's financial servant (1968)
