= Good Gracious, Annabelle =

1919 film by George Melford

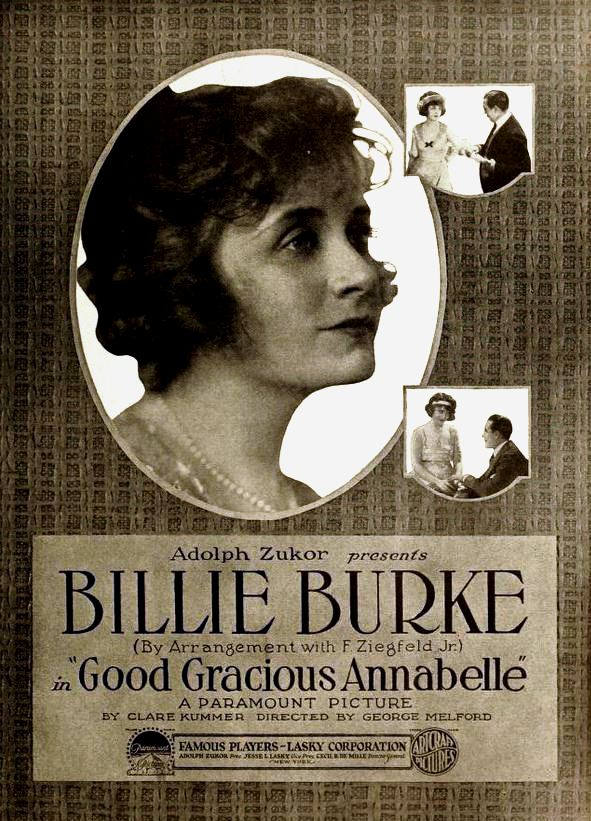
- Ad for film
- Directed by: George Melford
- Based on: Good Gracious Annabelle by Clare Kummer
- Produced by: Adolph Zukor; Jesse Lasky
- Cinematography: Paul Perry
- Production company: Famous Players–Lasky
- Distributed by: Paramount Pictures
- Release date: March 30, 1919
- Running time: 50 minutes
- Country: United States
- Languages: Silent; English intertitles

Good Gracious, Annabelle is a lost 1919 American silent society comedy film starring Billie Burke. It is based on the 1916 Broadway play, Good Gracious, Annabelle by Clare Kummer. This film was produced by Famous Players–Lasky with distribution by Paramount Pictures.

== Plot ==
As described in film magazines, Annabelle Leigh lives extravagantly on a quarterly allowance that she spends monthly, until she is tricked out of two shares of a mining stock by crude, western miner John Rawson, who compelled her to marry him after the death of her father in a squabble over the stock. The marriage is little more than form and rather than keeping her in a lonesome cabin where she cries perpetually, her magnanimous husband sets her free to go to New York City where she lives in an extravagant style. During a struggle for possession of her stock certificates with financier George Wimbledon, she takes a violent fancy towards a mysterious millionaire whom she meets during a party at Kent's Long Island estate. She tells him that she is resorting to all of the tricks she plays simply to save her husband, whose interests are threatened. The mysterious millionaire turns out to be that husband, who has shaved off his beard and wins her this time through love.

== Cast ==
- Billie Burke as Annabelle Leigh
- Herbert Rawlinson as John Rawson
- Gilbert Douglas as Harry Murchison
- Crauford Kent as George Wimbledon
- Frank Losee as William Gosling
- Leslie Casey as Wilbur Jennings
- Gordon Dana as Alfred Weatherby
- Delle Duncan as Ethel Deane
- Olga Downs as Gwendolyn Morley
- Thomas Braidon as James Ludgate
- Billie Wilson as Lottie

== Later adaptation ==
The play was also the basis of the 1931 romantic comedy Annabelle's Affairs.
