= Merrily We Live =

1938 film directed by Norman Z. McLeod

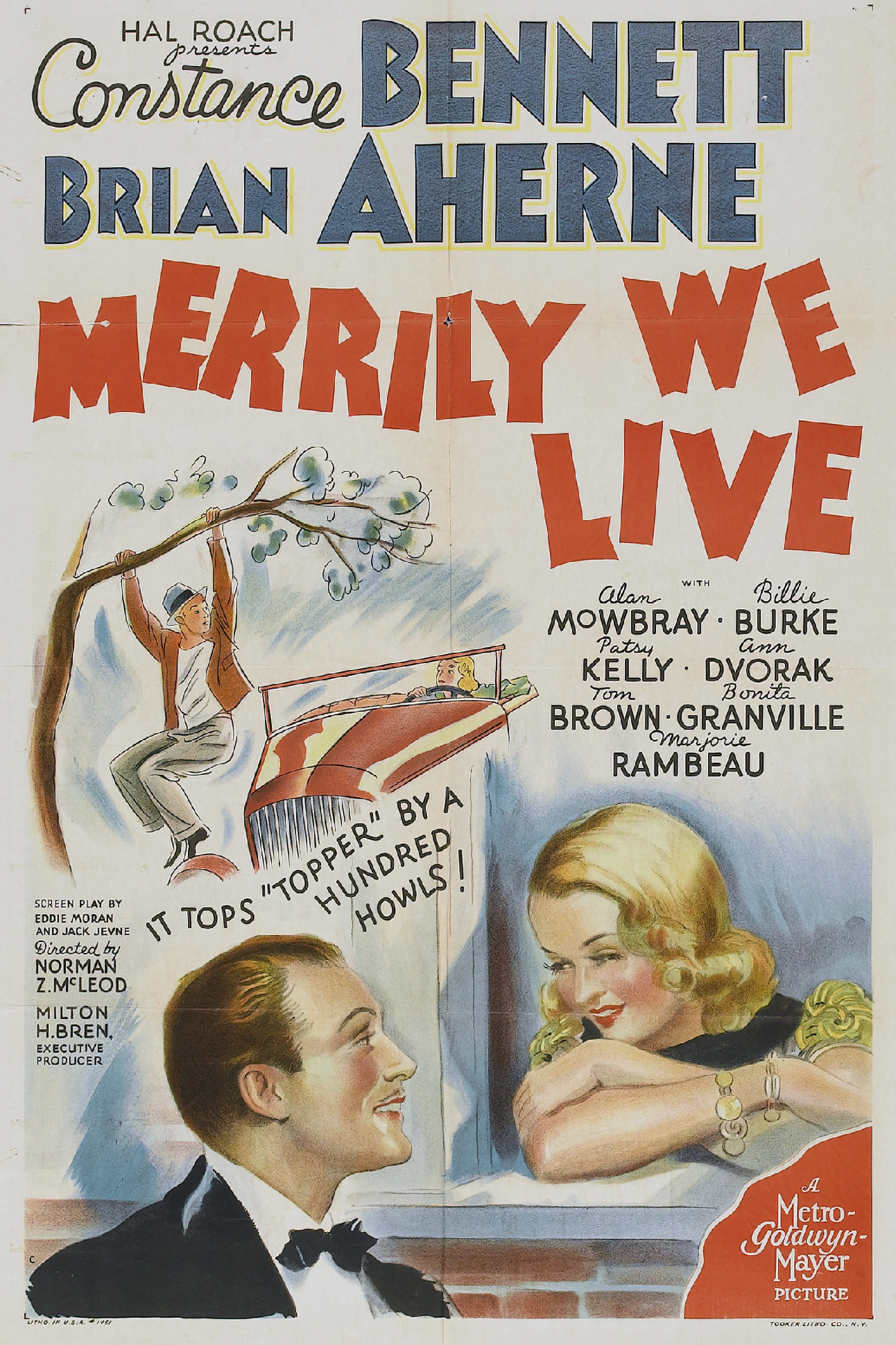
- Theatrical release poster
- Directed by: Norman Z. McLeod
- Screenplay by: Eddie Moran; Jack Jevne; Ed Sullivan (add'l dialog)
- Based on: The Dark Chapter 1924 novel by E.J. Rath; They All Want Something 1926 play by Courtenay Savage
- Produced by: Hal Roach; Milton H. Bren
- Starring: Constance Bennett; Brian Aherne
- Cinematography: Norbert Brodine
- Edited by: William H. Terhune
- Music by: Marvin Hatley
- Production company: Hal Roach Studios
- Distributed by: Metro-Goldwyn-Mayer
- Release date: February 8, 1938
- Running time: 95 minutes
- Country: United States
- Language: English

Merrily We Live is a 1938 American comedy film directed by Norman Z. McLeod and written by Eddie Moran and Jack Jevne. It stars Constance Bennett and Brian Aherne and features Ann Dvorak, Bonita Granville, Billie Burke, Tom Brown, Alan Mowbray, Clarence Kolb, and Patsy Kelly. The film was produced by Hal Roach for Hal Roach Studios, and was distributed by Metro-Goldwyn-Mayer.

The film is based on a reworking of the 1930 movie What a Man – itself based on the 1924 novel The Dark Chapter: A Comedy of Class Distinctions by E.J. Rath, and its 1926 Broadway adaptation They All Want Something by Courtenay Savage. However, some critics found the plot of the film similar to the 1936 movie My Man Godfrey.

Merrily We Live was extremely successful and garnered five Oscar nominations, including Best Supporting Actress for Billie Burke.

== Plot ==
Grosvenor (Alan Mowbray), the Kilbournes' butler, discovers at breakfast that the family silver has been stolen by Ambrose, the latest tramp Emily Kilbourne (Billie Burke) had taken under her wing as the family chauffeur in her obsession to reform fallen and destitute men, much to the exasperation of the rest of the family. A distressed Emily swears off taking in any more tramps, to the delight of the rest of the family. However, later in the morning, Wade Rawlins (Brian Aherne) appears at the Kilbournes' doorstep. His ramshackle car had broken down; when he got out, it rolled off a cliff. He wants to use the telephone, but is instead immediately adopted by Emily Kilbourne and appointed as the replacement chauffeur, despite the rude efforts of Grosvenor and Emily's daughters Geraldine "Jerry" (Constance Bennett) and Marion (Bonita Granville). Further attempts to convince Mrs. Kilbourne to get rid of this latest tramp are blissfully ignored.

Rawlins, as the new chauffeur, is housed in the servant's quarters. He is overheard talking to himself while cleaning up by Grosvenor and suspected to be crazy. Jerry and Marion see the spruced up tramp looking the perfect gentleman and Jerry approves when Rawlins later brushes off Jerry's arrogant would-be suitor, Herbert Wheeler (Phillip Reed). They now have second thoughts when their father, Henry Kilbourne (Clarence Kolb), who has returned from work, tells Emily that he is putting his foot down and orders that they get rid of her latest tramp the next day.

A comedy of errors, nighttime interludes with drunken family behavior, the arrogant Herbert making a move on Jerry, follows with the rescue of the damsel in distress who has also somehow misplaced her keys where some delightful flirting ensues, resulting in Jerry falling in love with Wade. Marion also expresses a crush on Wade. The next day, Emily Kilbourne, despite orders to get rid of Wade, trains him to be a footman at the important dinner party that evening for Senator Harlan (Paul Everton). That evening, through a contrived prank by Marion, Rawlins is accidentally invited to the important dinner party for Senator Harlan, who takes quite a liking to him, as does his daughter Minerva (Ann Dvorak).

The next morning, the family finds Rawlins occupying the guest room. It is impossible to throw him out, as it is discovered that he is now a confidant of Senator Harlan and his daughter's target of affection. Jerry is consumed with jealousy, as she sees Minerva flirting with Rawlins at golf later that morning. After a fudge-making spat with Jerry, Rawlins takes the rest of the day off on an errand. The car he wrecked turns out to be a loan. He goes to pay for it, but the car has been found and the police inform the car's owner that Rawlins is assumed to be dead. The man leaves to identify his car. Thus, when Rawlins arrives, the owner's assistant George (Willie Best) thinks he is a ghost. The Kilbournes believe Rawlins has left for good, much to Jerry's dismay after waiting up to reconcile with him.

The next morning at breakfast, the newspaper reports the death of E. Wade Rawlins, the "noted novelist", from a car crash, much to the shock and dismay of the family, the cook and the maid. When Rawlins reappears, very much alive, utter pandemonium ensues as much of the family assume they are seeing a ghost. Once the confusion dies down the truth becomes clear and Jerry is immensely relieved.

== Cast ==
- Constance Bennett as Geraldine "Jerry" Kilbourne
- Brian Aherne as E. Wade Rawlins, the tramp
- Alan Mowbray as Grosvenor, the butler
- Billie Burke as Emily Kilbourne
- Patsy Kelly as Etta, the cook
- Ann Dvorak as Minerva Harlan
- Tom Brown as Kane Kilbourne
- Clarence Kolb as Henry Kilbourne
- Bonita Granville as Marion Kilbourne
- Marjorie Rambeau as Mrs. Harlan
- Phillip Reed as Herbert Wheeler
- Willie Best as George W. Jones, the store assistant
- Sidney Bracey as hired Second Butler/Footman
- Paul Everton as Senator Willie Harlan
- Marjorie Kane as Rosa, the maid
- Olin Howland as Jed Smith, general store owner (uncredited)

Cast notes

- This was the fifth of six films that Billie Burke and Alan Mowbray appeared in together. The others were Where Sinners Meet (1934), Becky Sharp (1935), She Couldn't Take It (1935), Topper (1937), and Topper Takes a Trip (1938).

== Production ==
Merrily We Live was in production from October 27, 1937, to January 10, 1938. Some location filming took place at Arrowhead Hot Spring and Big Bear Lake in the San Bernardino Mountains of southern California.

Titles that were considered for the film included "Take It Easy," "Love Without Reason", and "Dark Chapter", which is the title of the E.J. Rath book the film is in part based on – although neither Rath's novel nor Courtenay Savage's play are credited.

Noted Broadway columnist Ed Sullivan provided additional dialogue for the film, his first assignment for Hal Roach Studios.

== Awards and honors ==
Merrily We Live received five Academy Award nominations in total: Best Supporting Actress (Billie Burke), Best Sound Recording (Elmer Raguse), Best Song ("Merrily We Live"), Best Art Direction (Charles D. Hall), and Best Cinematography (Norbert Brodine). Billie Burke's Best Supporting Actress nomination was the only Oscar nomination of her career.

== Adaptations ==
- On March 3, 1938, parts of Merrily We Live were recreated for the radio on MGM's Good News Radio program, featuring the stars of the film.
- In 1955, there was a Mexican version of the film under the title Escuela de vagabundos (School for Vagabonds) with Pedro Infante and Miroslava Stern as the lead actors.
