= Roland Young =

English-born actor (1887–1953)

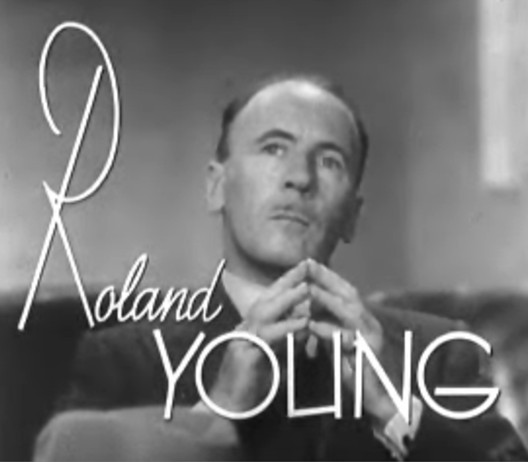
- Trailer for Topper Takes a Trip (1938)
- Born: 11 November 1887; London, England
- Died: 5 June 1953 (aged 65); New York City, U.S.
- Education: University College London; Royal Academy of Dramatic Art
- Occupation: Actor
- Years active: 1908–1953
- Spouses: Marjorie Kummer (m. 1921; div. 1940) Dorothy Patience May DuCroz (m. 1948)

Roland Young (11 November 1887 – 5 June 1953) was an English-born actor. He began his acting career on the London stage, but later found success in America and received an Academy Award nomination for his role in the film Topper (1937).

In 1960, Young was posthumously honored with two stars on the Hollywood Walk of Fame for his contributions in the television and motion pictures industries.

== Early life ==
Born in London, England, Young was the son of an architect, and early indications were that he would pursue the father's career. He was educated at Sherborne School, Sherborne, Dorset and University College London before being accepted into the Royal Academy of Dramatic Art where his classmate was Gordon Richards.

== Career ==
Young made his first stage appearance in London's West End in Find the Woman in 1908, and in 1912 he made his Broadway debut in Hindle Wakes. He appeared in two comedies written for him by Clare Kummer, Good Gracious Annabelle! (1916) and A Successful Calamity (1917) before he served with the United States Army during World War I. He returned to New York when the war ended, and married Kummer's daughter Majorie in 1921 after they costarred in Kummer's Rollo's Wild Oat. For the next few years, he alternated between New York and London. He made his film debut in the 1922 silent film Sherlock Holmes, in which he played Watson opposite John Barrymore as Holmes.

He signed a contract with Metro-Goldwyn-Mayer and made his talkie debut in The Unholy Night (1929), directed by Lionel Barrymore. He was loaned to Warner Bros. to appear in Her Private Life (also 1929), with Billie Dove and Fox Film Corporation, winning critical approval for his comedic performance as Jeanette MacDonald's husband in Don't Bet on Women (1931). He was again paired with MacDonald Annabelle's Affairs (1931), a talkie version of Good Gracious Annabelle!. He appeared in Cecil B. de Mille's The Squaw Man, and played opposite Alfred Lunt and Lynn Fontanne in The Guardsman (both 1931). He appeared with Evelyn Brent in Columbia's The Pagan Lady (also 1931) and Pola Negri in RKO's A Woman Commands (1932). His final film under his MGM contract was Lovers Courageous (1932), opposite Robert Montgomery. He had a starring role in a risqué comedy for Fox entitled Pleasure Cruise (1933) alongside Genevieve Tobin.

== Freelance performer ==
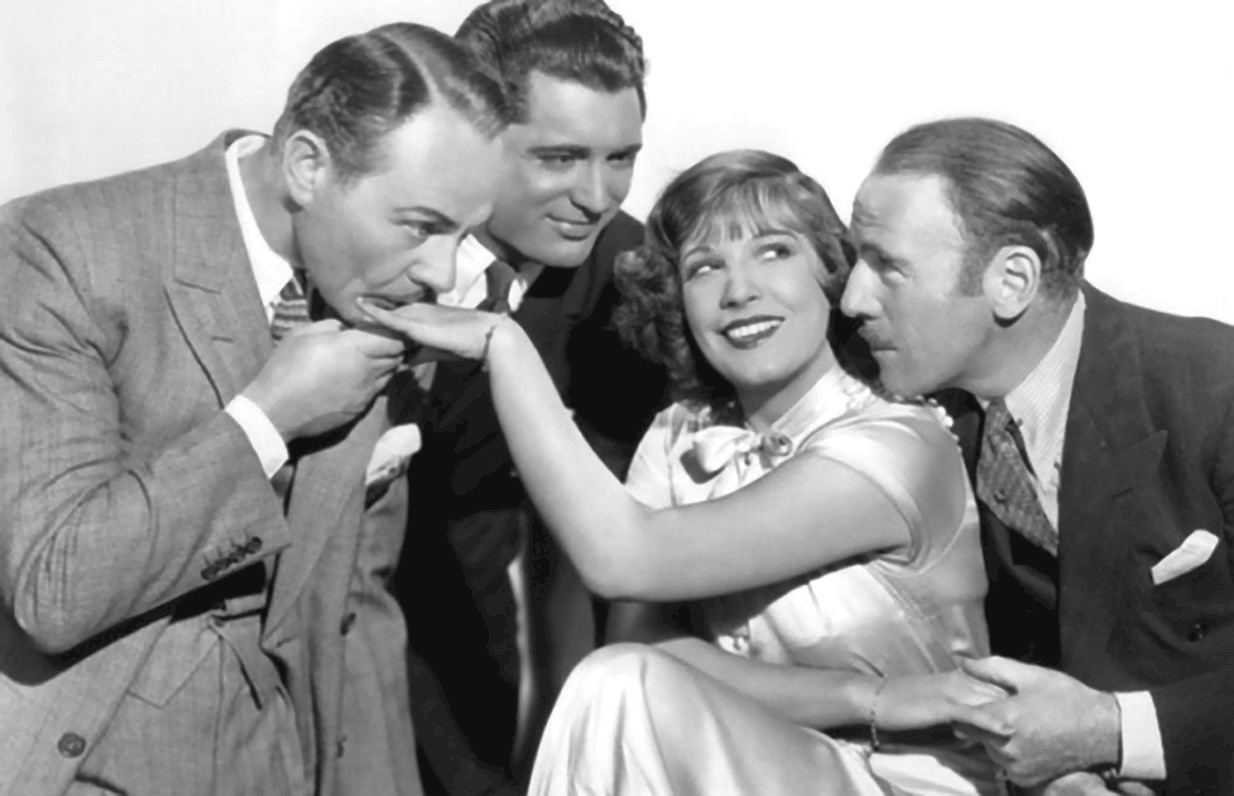
Charlie Ruggles (far left), Cary Grant (2nd from left), Lili Damita (centre), and Young (right) in film This is the Night (1932)

Young began to work as a freelance performer and found himself in constant demand. He appeared with Jeanette MacDonald, Genevieve Tobin and Maurice Chevalier in One Hour With You (1932) and with Kay Francis in Street of Women (1932). Alexander Korda invited him to return to Britain to make his British film debut in Wedding Rehearsal (1932). He returned to Hollywood and appeared in a diverse group of films that included comedies, murder mysteries, and dramas, and also worked on Broadway. Among his films of this period were Ruggles of Red Gap (1935), David Copperfield (1935) (playing Uriah Heep), and the H. G. Wells fantasy The Man Who Could Work Miracles (1936).

In 1937, he achieved one of the most important successes of his career in Topper, as a bank president haunted by the ghosts of his clients, played by Cary Grant and Constance Bennett. It was one of the most successful films of the year, and Young was nominated for the Academy Award for Best Supporting Actor. Topper's wife was played by Billie Burke, who wrote in her memoir that Young "was dry and always fun to work with". They also appeared together in The Young in Heart (1938), Dulcy (1940) and both of the Topper sequels, Topper Takes a Trip (1938) and Topper Returns (1941). He continued to play supporting roles in comedies such as Yes, My Darling Daughter, with Fay Bainter and Priscilla Lane, but over the next few years the importance of his roles again decreased. He achieved another success as Uncle Willie in The Philadelphia Story (1940) with Katharine Hepburn, Cary Grant and James Stewart. His last starring role was in the final instalment of the Topper series, Topper Returns in 1941, with Billie Burke, Joan Blondell and Carole Landis.

== Artwork ==
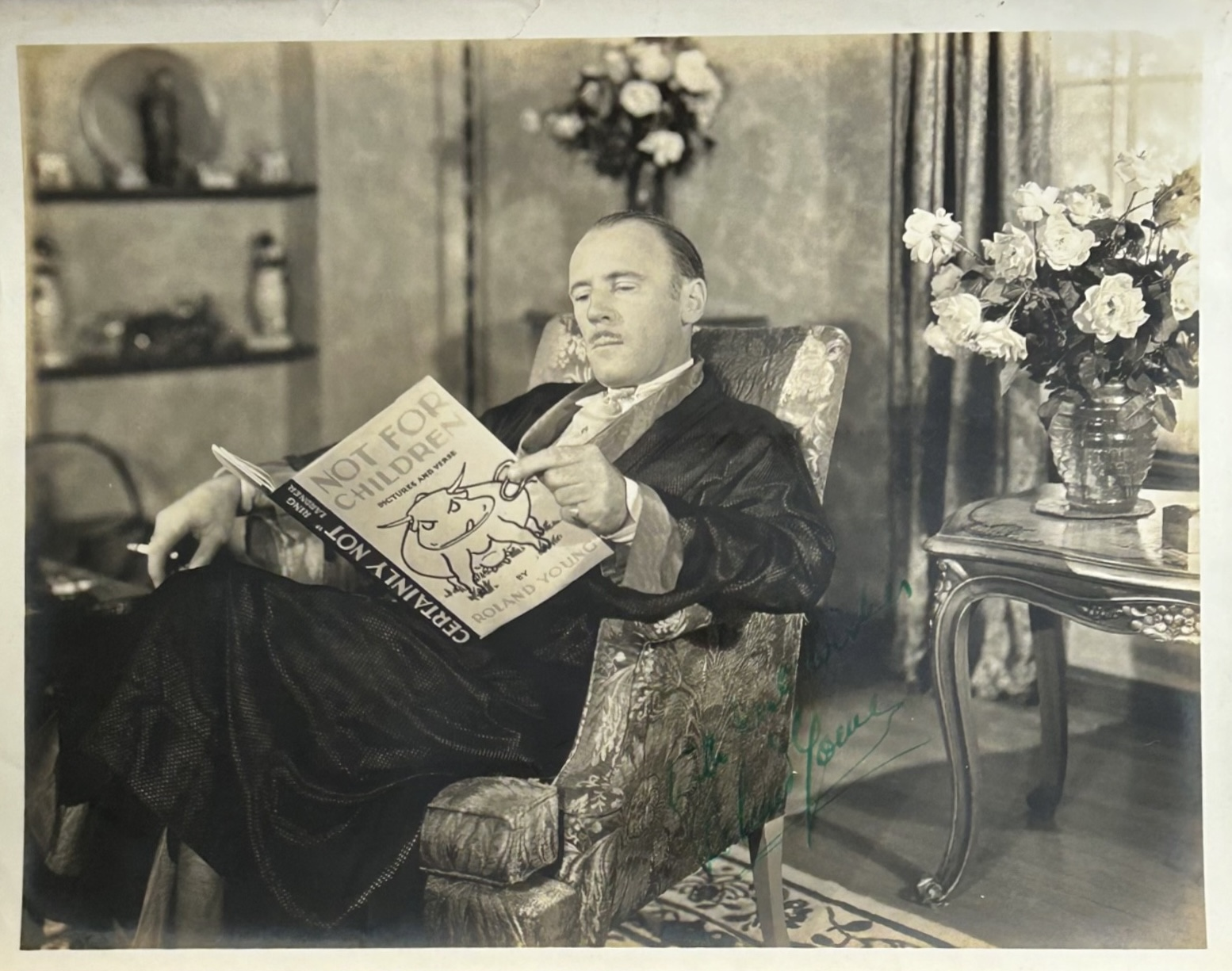
Not For Children

As a visual artist, Young drew caricatures of notables, some of which appeared in Life magazine in the early 1920s. In 1925, a collection was published in the form of a limited-edition book, Actors and Others. A similar volume, Not For Children, was issued in 1930.

== Later life and career ==
He continued working steadily through the 1940s, playing small roles opposite some of Hollywood's leading actresses, such as Joan Crawford, Marlene Dietrich, Paulette Goddard and Greta Garbo in her final film, Two-Faced Woman (1941). In 1945, he began his own radio show and appeared in the film adaption of Agatha Christie's And Then There Were None. By the end of the decade his film career had declined, and his final films, including The Great Lover (1949), in which he played a murderer opposite Bob Hope, and Fred Astaire's Let's Dance (1950), were not successful.

In the 1950s, Young appeared on several episodic television series, including Lux Video Theatre, Studio One, Pulitzer Prize Playhouse and The Chevrolet Tele-Theatre.

== Recognition ==
Young has two stars on the Hollywood Walk of Fame, one for film at 6523 Hollywood Blvd. and another for television at 6315 Hollywood Blvd. Both were dedicated 8 February 1960.

== Personal life ==
Young was married twice, to Marjorie Kummer from 1921 until 1940, and to Patience DuCroz from 1948 until his death at home in New York City at 65 in 1953.

== Filmography ==
Year	Film	Role	Director	Notes
1922	Sherlock Holmes	Dr. Watson	Albert Parker	
1924	Grit	Houdini Hart	Frank Tuttle	Lost film
1926	Camille	Lord Kyne	Ralph Barton	Short
1928	Walls Tell Tales			Short
1929	Her Private Life	Charteris	Alexander Korda	
1929	The Unholy Night	Lord Montague	Lionel Barrymore	
1929	Wise Girls	Duke Merrill	E. Mason Hopper	
1930	The Bishop Murder Case	Sigurd Arnesson	Nick Grinde	
1930	Madam Satan	Jimmy Wade	Cecil B. DeMille	
1930	New Moon	Count Strogoff	Jack Conway	
1931	Don't Bet on Women	Herbert Drake	William K. Howard	
1931	The Prodigal	Doc aka Somerset Greenman	Harry A. Pollard	
1931	Annabelle's Affairs	Roland Wimbleton	Alfred L. Werker	
1931	The Squaw Man	Sir John Applegate	Cecil B. DeMille	
1931	The Pagan Lady	Dr. Heath	John Francis Dillon	
1931	The Guardsman	The Critic	Harold S. Bucquet	
1932	Lovers Courageous	Jeffrey	Robert Z. Leonard	
1932	A Woman Commands	King Alexander	E. J. Babille	
1932	One Hour with You	Professor Olivier	Ernst Lubitsch	
1932	This Is the Night	Gerald Gray	Frank Tuttle	
1932	Street of Women	Linkhorne 'Link' Gibson	Archie Mayo	
1932	Wedding Rehearsal	The Marquis of Buckminster	Alexander Korda	
1932	They Just Had to Get Married	Hillary Hume	Edward Ludwig	
1933	A Lady's Profession	Lord Reginald Withers	Norman Z. McLeod	
1933	Pleasure Cruise	Andrew Poole	Frank Tuttle	
1933	Blind Adventure	The Burglar	Ernest B. Schoedsack	
1933	His Double Life	Priam Farrel	William C. deMille	
1934	Here is My Heart	Prince Nicholas/Nicki	Frank Tuttle	
1935	David Copperfield	Uriah Heep	George Cukor	
1935	Ruggles of Red Gap	George – Earl of Burnstead	Leo McCarey	
1936	The Unguarded Hour	Bunny	Sam Wood	
1936	One Rainy Afternoon	Maillot	Rowland V. Lee	
1936	Give Me Your Heart	Tubbs Barrow	Archie Mayo	
1937	The Man Who Could Work Miracles	George McWhirter Fotheringay	Lothar Mendes	
1937	Gypsy	Alan Brooks	Roy William Neill	
1937	Call It a Day	Frank Haines	Archie Mayo	
1937	King Solomon's Mines	Commander John Good	Geoffrey Barkas	
1937	Topper	Mr. Cosmo Topper	Norman Z. McLeod	Academy Award nomination – Best Supporting Actor
1937	Ali Baba Goes to Town	Sultan	David Butler	
1938	Sailing Along	Anthony Gulliver	Sonnie Hale	
1938	The Young in Heart	'Sahib' Carleton	Richard Wallace	
1938	Topper Takes a Trip	Mr. Cosmo Topper	Norman Z. McLeod	
1939	Yes, My Darling Daughter	Titus Jaywood	William Keighley	
1939	Here I Am a Stranger	Prof. Daniels	Roy Del Ruth	
1939	The Night of Nights	Barry Keith-Trimble	Lewis Milestone	
1940	He Married His Wife	Bill Carter	Roy Del Ruth	
1940	Star Dust	Thomas Brooke	Walter Lang	
1940	Irene	Mr. Smith	Herbert Wilcox	
1940	Private Affairs	Amos Bullerton	Albert S. Rogell	
1940	Dulcy	Roger Forbes	S. Sylvan Simon	
1940	The Philadelphia Story	William Q. Tracy (Uncle Willie)	George Cukor	
1940	No, No, Nanette	Mr. 'Happy' Jimmy Smith	Herbert Wilcox	
1941	Topper Returns	Cosmo Topper	Roy Del Ruth	
1941	The Flame of New Orleans	Charles Giraud	René Clair	
1941	Two-Faced Woman	O.O. Miller	George Cukor	
1942	The Lady Has Plans	Ronald Dean	Sidney Lanfield	
1942	They All Kissed the Bride	Marsh	Alexander Hall	
1942	Tales of Manhattan	Edgar	Julien Duvivier	
1943	Forever and a Day	Henry Barringer	[1]	
1944	Standing Room Only	Ira Cromwell	Sidney Lanfield	
1945	And Then There Were None	Detective William Henry Bloor	René Clair	
1948	Bond Street	George Chester-Barrett	Gordon Parry	
1948	You Gotta Stay Happy	Ralph Tutwiler	H.C. Potter	
1949	The Great Lover	C.J. Dabney	Alexander Hall	
1950	Let's Dance	Edmund Pohlwhistle	Norman Z. McLeod	
1951	St. Benny the Dip	Matthew	Edgar G. Ulmer	
1951	Lux Video Theatre	Sumner		TV
1953	That Man from Tangier	George	Robert Elwyn	

== Partial list of stage appearances ==
- Hindle Wakes (1912)
- Good Gracious, Annabelle (1916)
- A Successful Calamity (1917)
- The Gipsy Trail (1917)
- Buddies (1919)
- Rollo's Wild Oat (1920)
- The Devil's Disciple (1923)
- Beggar on Horseback (1924)
- The Last of Mrs. Cheyney (1925)
- The Queen's Husband (1928)
- Her Master's Voice (1933)
- Spring Thaw (1938)
- Another Love Story (1943)

== See also ==
- List of actors with Academy Award nominations

== Writing ==
- Actors and Others (Pascal Covici, 1925)
- Not For Children: Pictures and Verse (Doubleday, Doran & Co., 1930)
- Thorne Smith: His Life and Times (Doubleday, Doran & Co., 1934)
