= Elmer Raguse =

American sound engineer

Elmer Roy Raguse
- Born: May 9, 1901; Springfield, Massachusetts, United States
- Died: March 2, 1972 (aged 70); Palm Beach, Florida, United States
- Occupation: Sound engineer
- Years active: 1929-1966

Elmer R. Raguse (May 9, 1901 – March 2, 1972) was an American sound engineer mostly associated with the Hal Roach Studios. He was nominated for eight Academy Awards in the categories Best Sound Recording and Best Effects.

Editor Richard Currier said, "In pictures, if you can't get an effect one way, you figure out another way of getting it. But with Raguse, there was only one line you could follow, and that was that." He wanted to record a gunshot on a project Raguse was involved in, but he refused on the grounds that it would break the light valve. Currier questioned him on it, imagining the valve couldn't be prohibitively expensive. Raguse confirmed it would be twenty cents, so Currier fired the gun in defiance.

== Selected filmography ==
Best Sound

- General Spanky (1936)
- Topper (1937)
- Merrily We Live (1938)
- Of Mice and Men (1939)
- Captain Caution (1940)
- Topper Returns (1941)

Best Effects

- One Million B.C. (1940)
- Topper Returns (1941)
