= Her Master's Voice =

1936 film by Joseph Santley

- Directed by: Joseph Santley
- Written by: Dore Schary; Harry Sauber
- Based on: Her Master's Voice by Clare Kummer
- Produced by: Walter Wanger
- Starring: Edward Everett Horton; Peggy Conklin; Laura Hope Crews
- Cinematography: James Van Trees
- Edited by: Robert Simpson
- Music by: Heinz Roemheld
- Production company: Walter Wanger Productions
- Distributed by: Paramount Pictures
- Release date: January 17, 1936
- Running time: 75 minutes
- Country: United States
- Language: English
- Budget: $161,829
- Box office: $214,464

Her Master's Voice is a 1936 film directed by Joseph Santley and based on the 1933 play Her Master's Voice by Clare Kummer. The film's sets were designed by the art director Alexander Toluboff.

== Plot ==
A wealthy woman moves her niece to her estate and away from her niece's jobless husband, who the aunt believes is a worthless bum. Through a misunderstanding, the husband is hired to work at the estate and complications ensue.

== Cast ==
- Edward Everett Horton as Ned Farrar
- Peggy Conklin as Queena Farrar
- Laura Hope Crews as Aunt Minnie Stickney
- Elizabeth Patterson as Mrs. Ellie Martin
- Grant Mitchell as Horace J. Twilling
- Charles Coleman as Craddock
- Ruth Warren as Phoebe
- Dick Elliott as Police Captain
- Robert Homans as Stationmaster
- Fred Santley as Motorcycle Cop

== Reception ==
The film was not a financial success and recorded a loss of $2,300.
