= Captain Caution =

1940 film

- Film poster
- Directed by: Richard Wallace
- Written by: Kenneth Roberts; Grover Jones
- Based on: Captain Caution; 1934 novel by Kenneth Roberts
- Produced by: Grover Jones; Richard Wallace
- Starring: Victor Mature
- Cinematography: Norbert Brodine
- Edited by: James E. Newcom
- Music by: Irvin Talbot; Phil Ohman
- Production company: Hal Roach Studios
- Distributed by: United Artists
- Release date: August 9, 1940
- Running time: 86 minutes
- Country: United States
- Language: English
- Budget: $761,766
- Box office: $531,149

Captain Caution is a 1940 American adventure film directed by Richard Wallace set during the War of 1812. The film stars Victor Mature, Bruce Cabot and Alan Ladd. It was based on the novel of the same name by Kenneth Roberts. Elmer Raguse was nominated for an Academy Award for Sound Recording.

== Plot ==
In 1812, Captain Dorman (Robert Barrat) is the owner of the Olive Branch, an American merchant ship sailing from the Far East to the United States. His daughter Corunna (Louise Platt) is on board, along with her boyfriend sailor, Dan Marvin (Victor Mature). No one is aware that the War of 1812 between Great Britain and the United States has begun.

A British brig piloted by Lieutenant Strope (Miles Mander) fires on the Olive Branch, killing Dorman. A furious Corunna vows vengeance on the British. When Dan counsels caution instead, she contemptuously dubs him "Captain Caution". Corunna and her crew are taken prisoner aboard the British ship. There they meet Lucien Argandeau (Leo Carillo), his wife Victorine and Slade, a slave trader, also prisoners.

When the brig falls under attack, the prisoners rebel and regain control of the Olive Branch. Now the ship captain, Corunna appoints Slade as first mate and orders the ship to France. Her plan is to meet with the American consul in port and have him commission the ship as a privateer to fight the British.

Upon docking in France, Corunna goes ashore to visit the consul. Meanwhile, Slade makes a secret deal with the British to recapture the Olive Branch and turn it over to him. When Corunna returns, she sees that the British have captured the ship. Slade then tells the distraught Corunna that it was Dan who betrayed her. He persuades her to sail away with him on the Olive Branch

Meanwhile, Marvin and the American crew are held prisoner aboard a British ship in the harbor. Dan devises an escape plan. He will distract the British sailors by fighting with their champ while the Olive Branch crew sneaks off the ship.

Once they are all free, Dan and the crew commandeer an unarmed pleasure yacht. They force the captain to chase after the Olive Branch. When Slade starts firing cannon at the yacht, Corunna realizes that he was the traitor. When the two ships come together, Dan and his fight Slade and take the Olive Branch. Slade is captured and Corunna and Dan are reunited.

== Cast ==
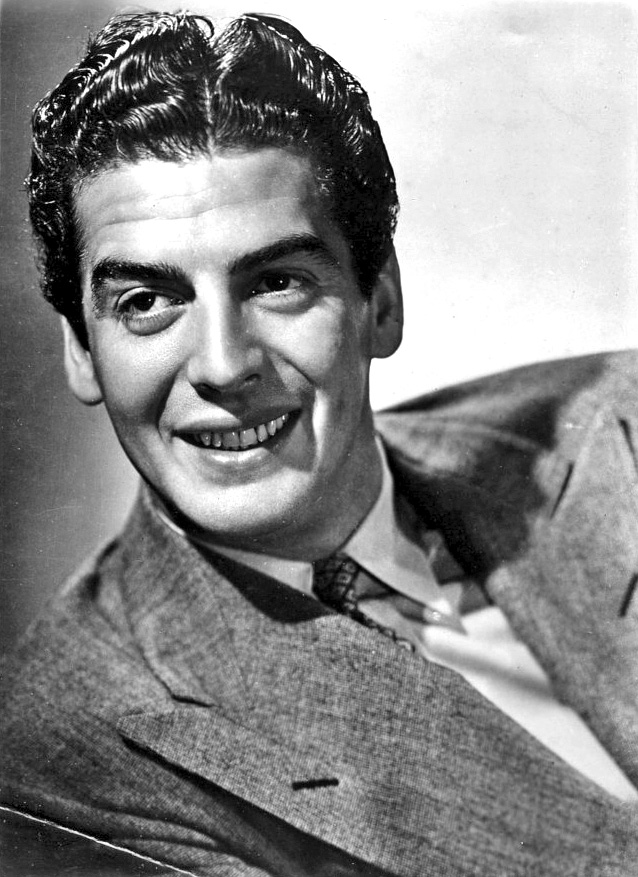
Victor Mature as Dan Marvin

- Victor Mature as Daniel 'Dan' Marvin
- Louise Platt as Corunna Dorman
- Leo Carrillo as Lucien Argandeau
- Bruce Cabot as Lehrman Slade
- Robert Barrat as Capt. Dorman
- Vivienne Osborne as Victorine Argandeau
- Miles Mander as Lieut. Strope
- El Brendel as Slushy
- Roscoe Ates as Chips
- Andrew Tombes as sad eyes
- Aubrey Mather as Mr. Henry Potter
- Alan Ladd as Newton – mutinous sailor
- Leyland Hodgson as British ship's brig officer
- Lloyd Corrigan as Capt. Stannage
- Pierre Watkin as American consul
- Cliff Severn as Travers
- Bud Jamison as Blinks
- James Dime as a sailor
- Olaf Hytten as Stannage's Aide (uncredited)
- Ethan Laidlaw as Prisoner (uncredited)

== Production ==
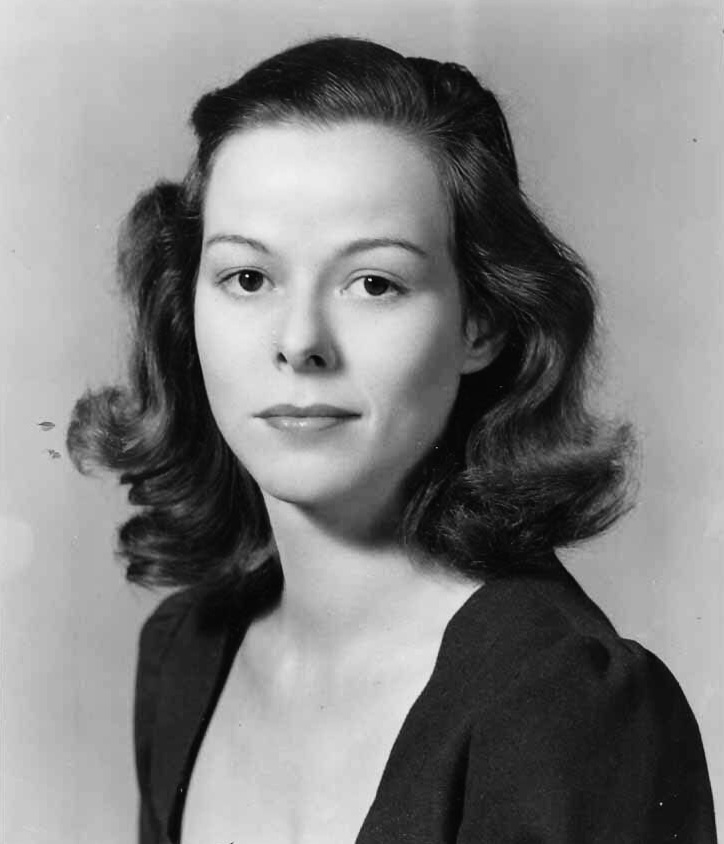
Louise Platt as Corunna Dorman

Kenneth Roberts' novel Captain Caution was published in 1934, becoming a bestseller. The film rights were bought by Hal Roach, as part of a five-picture deal he had with United Artists. (The other films were The Housekeeper's Daughter, One Million Years BC, Of Mice and Men and a novel by Thorne Smith.) Eugene Sollow was assigned to write the script. Roach originally wanted John Wayne for the lead role, but then gave it to Victor Mature.

Plans to film Captain Caution were delayed following the 1939 outbreak of World War II, out of fear it could be seen by American audiences as anti-British. However, "sea pictures" were in vogue at the time (e.g. The Sea Hawk, South of Pago Pago) so Roach decided to proceed anyway.The anti-British tone of the novel was softened and the script rewritten by producer Grover Jones, who said

"in the main we won't be giving them much time to think about whether they like the theme of the picture or not. We'll be giving them action and more action. And if we let a little plot to trickle in to let them know why they are getting all that fighting, we do it only because the camera needs a new set up now and again."

Filming of Captain Caution started in April 1940 under the direction of Richard Wallace.
