= Roy Seawright =

American film special effects technician (1905–91)

Roy Seawright (November 19, 1905, in Los Angeles, California – April 30, 1991, in Torrance, California) was a Hollywood special effects technician, principally with Hal Roach Studios.

== Biography ==
Seawright's father was the chief architect of Hal Roach's Culver City studios. He died in 1919 during a construction accident during the building of the complex. Roy joined Roach initially as a mail boy and errand boy in 1920.

Seawright worked his way up to casting director, then the Property Department, and later became the head of Roach's animation studio. Seawright's animation appeared in many of the Roach studio's shorts such as animating eyes, balloon captions, and other items drawn on the film. In 1934's Babes in Toyland Seawright did a stop motion animation sequence for the toy soldiers marching to attack the Bogeymen.

Credited as head of the Process Department in 1937, some of Seawright's most famous work was in Topper Takes a Trip and One Million B.C. where his dinosaur footage was recycled countless times in many lesser films. Seawright was nominated for an Oscar three times in succession for the latter two films and Topper Returns.

During World War II, Seawright was commissioned a Major in the US Army Air Forces' First Motion Picture Unit where he provided special effects for many military training films and Memphis Belle: A Story of a Flying Fortress. He left Hal Roach after returning from the Army, eventually working for Eagle-Lion Films providing special effects for Phil Karlson's The Big Cat and Port of New York.

Seawright entered a partnership with former Warner Brothers cartoon writer Dave Monahan as his director of photography.

Seawright and his wife Bernice "Bunny" Seawright were beach volleyball fans and started Hermosa Beach's Seawright Tourney in 1968.
