= Don't Bet on Women =

1931 film

- Directed by: William K. Howard
- Written by: Leon Gordon; William Anthony McGuire; Lynn Starling
- Produced by: John W. Considine Jr. William Fox
- Starring: Edmund Lowe; Jeanette MacDonald; Roland Young
- Cinematography: Lucien N. Andriot
- Edited by: Harold D. Schuster
- Production company: Fox Film Corporation
- Distributed by: Fox Film Corporation
- Release date: March 6, 1931
- Running time: 70 minutes
- Country: United States
- Language: English

Don't Bet on Women is a 1931 American pre-Code romantic comedy film directed by William K. Howard and starring Edmund Lowe, Jeanette MacDonald and Roland Young.

== Plot ==
On a whim, Herbert Blake proposes a wager with Roger Fallon that he won't be able to get a kiss during the coming 48 hours from the next woman who happens to walk into the room. Fallon takes the bet, whereupon the woman who turns up is Herbert's wife.

== Cast ==
- Edmund Lowe as Roger Fallon
- Jeanette MacDonald as Jeanne Drake
- Roland Young as Herbert Drake
- J.M. Kerrigan as Chipley Duff
- Una Merkel as Tallulah Hope
- Helene Millard as Doris Brent
- Louise Beavers as Maid
- Sumner Getchell as Office Boy
- Henry Kolker as Butterfield
- James T. Mack as Sommers - Fallon's Butler
- Cyril Ring as Jeanne's Dancing Partner

== Bibliography ==
- Turk, Edward Baron. Hollywood Diva: A Biography of Jeanette MacDonald. University of California Press, 1998.
