= Topper (film) =

1937 film by Norman Z. McLeod

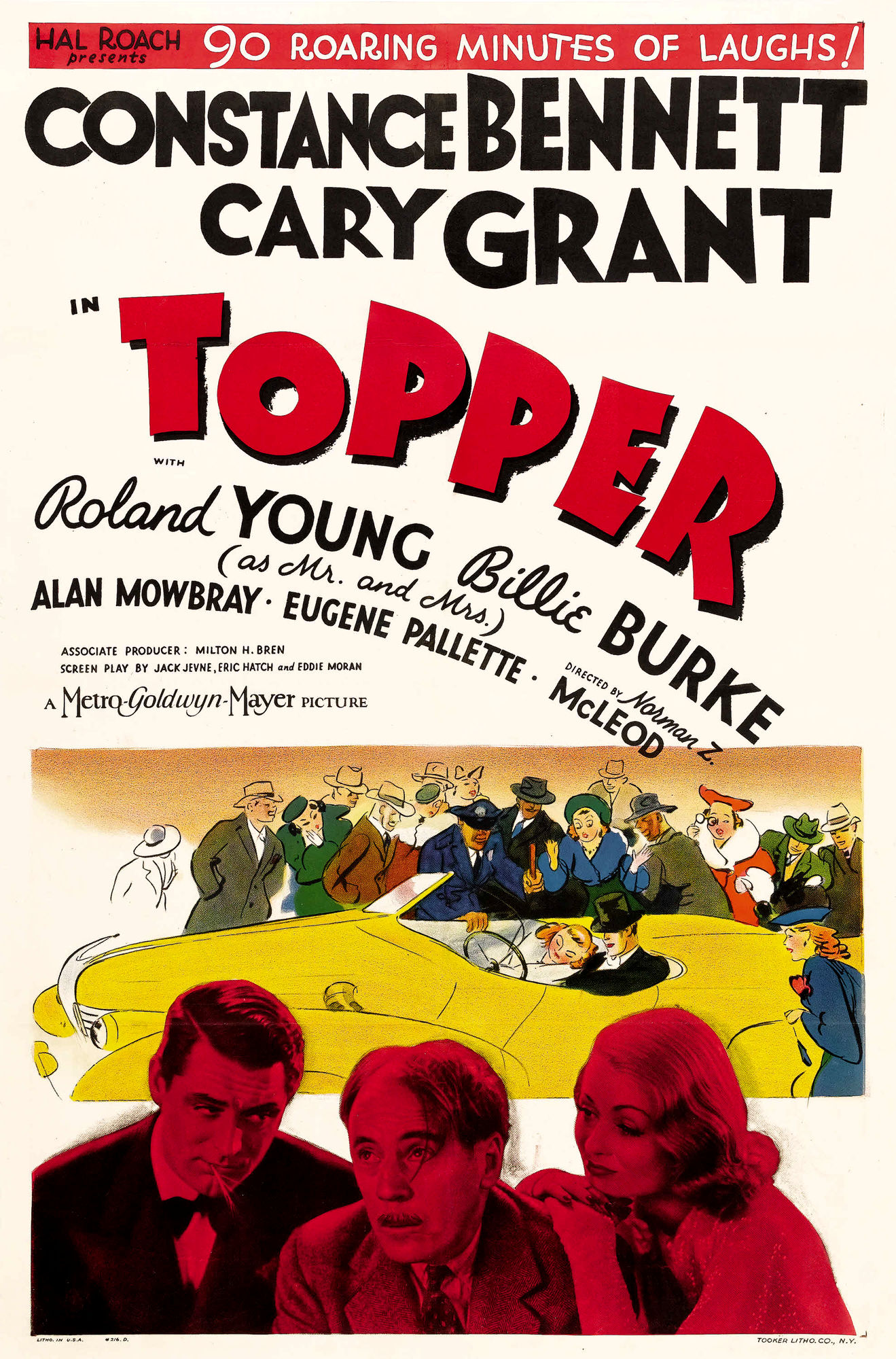
- Theatrical poster
- Directed by: Norman Z. McLeod
- Screenplay by: Jack Jevne; Eric Hatch; Eddie Moran
- Based on: Topper (1926 novel) by Thorne Smith
- Produced by: Hal Roach
- Starring: Constance Bennett; Cary Grant; Roland Young
- Cinematography: Norbert Brodine
- Edited by: William H. Terhune
- Music by: Marvin Hatley
- Production company: Hal Roach Studios
- Distributed by: Metro-Goldwyn-Mayer
- Release date: July 16, 1937 (U.S.)
- Running time: 97 minutes
- Country: United States
- Language: English
- Budget: $500,000 (proposed)
- Box office: $2 million (U.S. and Canada rentals)

Topper is a 1937 American supernatural comedy film starring Constance Bennett and Cary Grant, and featuring Roland Young, Billie Burke, Alan Mowbray, and Eugene Pallette in support. Directed by Norman Z. McLeod, it tells the story of a stuffy, stuck-in-his-ways man who is haunted by the ghosts of a fun-loving married couple. The film was adapted by Eric Hatch, Jack Jevne and Eddie Moran from the 1926 novel by Thorne Smith. It was produced by Hal Roach and distributed by Metro-Goldwyn-Mayer. Topper was a huge hit with film audiences in the summer of 1937. Topper was the first black-and-white film to be digitally colorized, re-released in 1985 by Hal Roach Studios.

== Plot ==
George and Marion Kerby are as irresponsible as they are rich. When George wrecks their flashy custom roadster, they wake up from the accident as ghosts. Realizing they are neither in Heaven nor Hell because they have never been responsible enough to do good deeds nor sufficiently venal to do bad, they decide that freeing their old friend Cosmo Topper from his suffocatingly regimented lifestyle will be their ticket into Heaven.

Topper, a wealthy bank president, is oppressed by boredom and routine, compounded by his social-climbing wife Clara’s obsession with presenting a respectable façade. On a whim, he buys the late Kerbys’ car. Soon he meets the ghosts of his dead friends, and immediately they begin to liven up his dull life with drinking, dancing, flirting, and fun.

The escapades lead quickly to Cosmo's arrest, and the ensuing scandal alienates his wife. To her astonishment, some of New York City’s upper crust she has been desperate to socialize with are piqued by the incident and cozy up.

Cosmo moves out into a hotel with Marion, who claims she is no longer married since she is dead. Clara fears she has lost Cosmo forever. The Toppers' loyal butler suggests that she lighten up a bit; she decides he's right and dons the lingerie and other attire of "a forward woman".

After Cosmo has a near-death experience and nearly joins George and Marion in the afterlife, the Toppers are happily reunited, and George and Marion, their good deed done, gladly depart for Heaven.

== Cast ==
- Constance Bennett as Marion Kerby
- Cary Grant as George Kerby
- Roland Young as Cosmo Topper
- Billie Burke as Mrs. Clara Topper
- Alan Mowbray as Wilkins, the butler
- Eugene Pallette as Casey
- Arthur Lake as elevator boy / bell boy
- Hedda Hopper as Mrs. Grace Stuyvesant
- Virginia Sale as Miss Johnson
- Elaine Shepard as Secretary
- Ward Bond as a cab driver (uncredited)
- Dorothy Christy as Nurse (uncredited)
- Grace Hayle as Outraged Heavy Woman (uncredited)

Cast notes

- Early on in the film, songwriter and pianist Hoagy Carmichael makes an uncredited cameo appearance—his debut acting role—as the piano player in the sequence where George and Marion are on the town the night before the meeting at the bank. He introduces the song "Old Man Moon," which is sung by Grant and Bennett. It's also sung later by Three Hits and a Miss. As the couple leave the bar, George (Grant) says, "(Good)night Hoagy!" and Carmichael replies, "So long, see ya next time".
- Lana Turner makes her second film appearance, uncredited, as a nightclub patron.
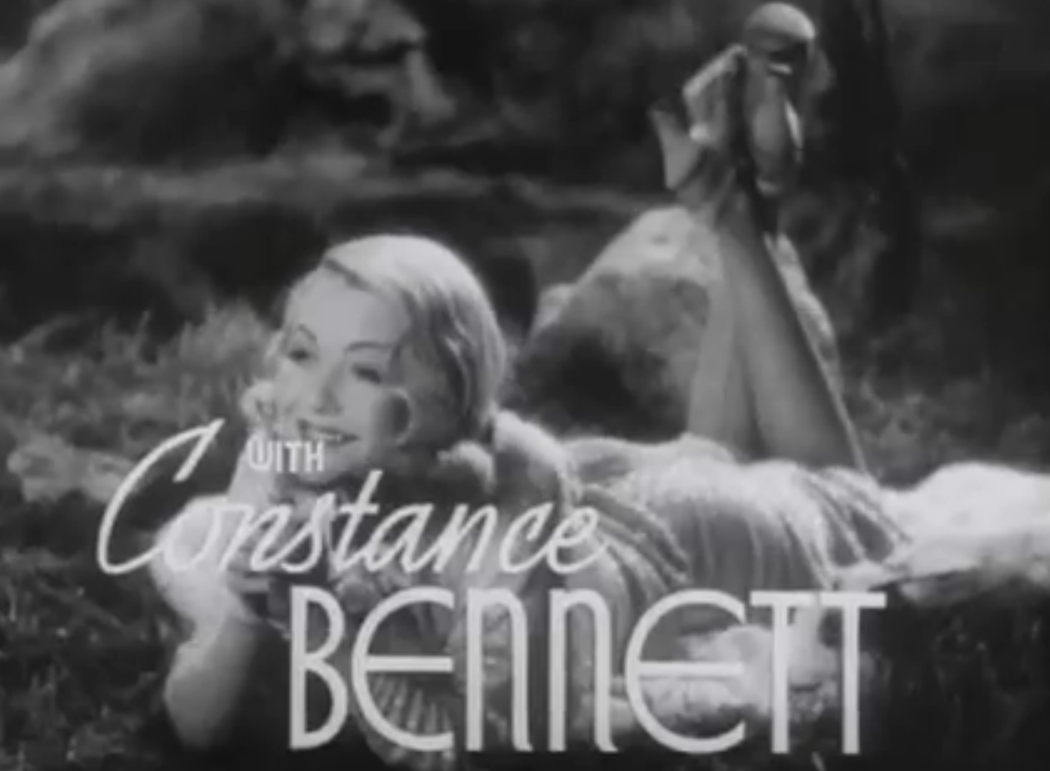
Constance Bennett

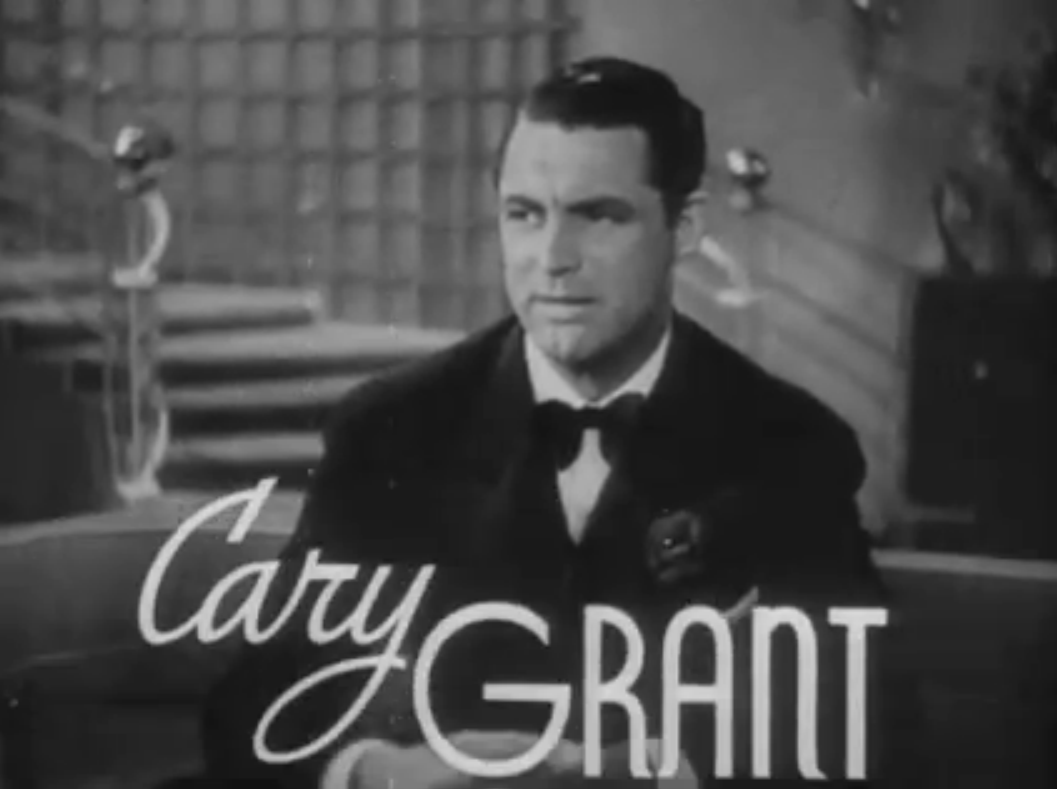
Cary Grant

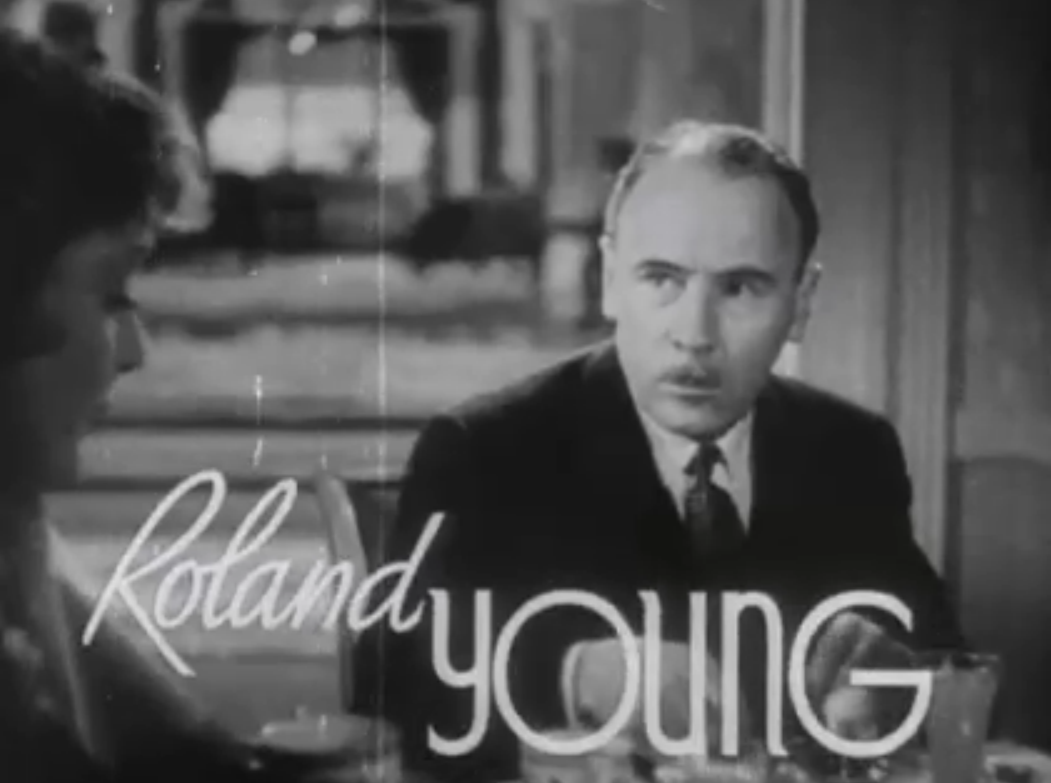
Roland Young

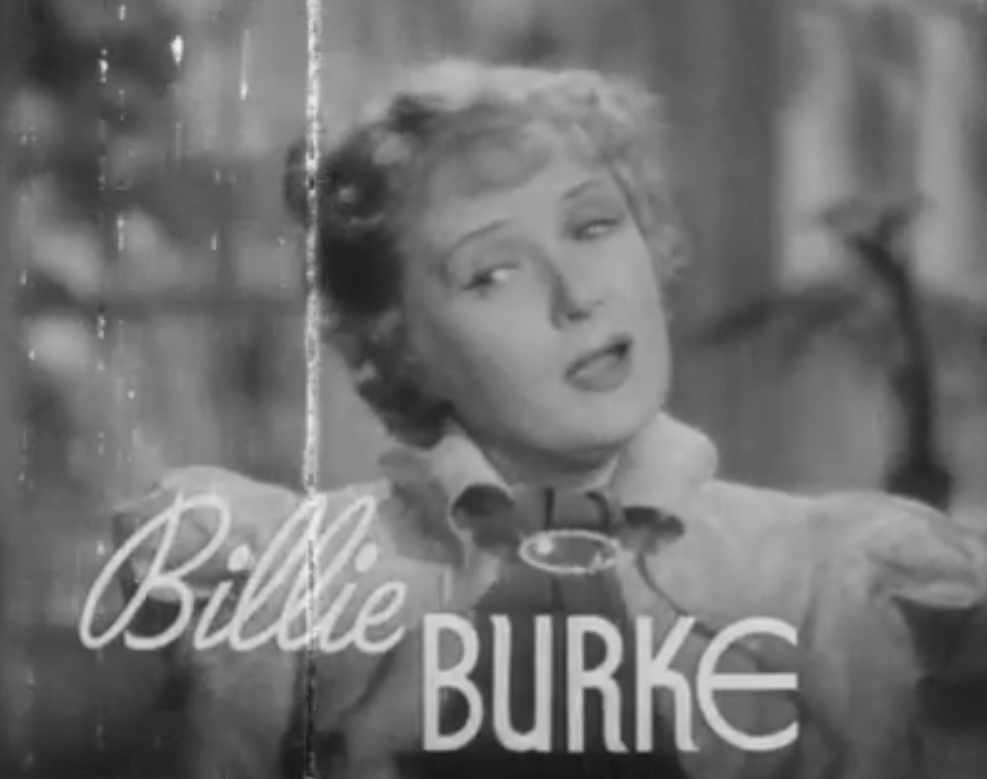
Billie Burke

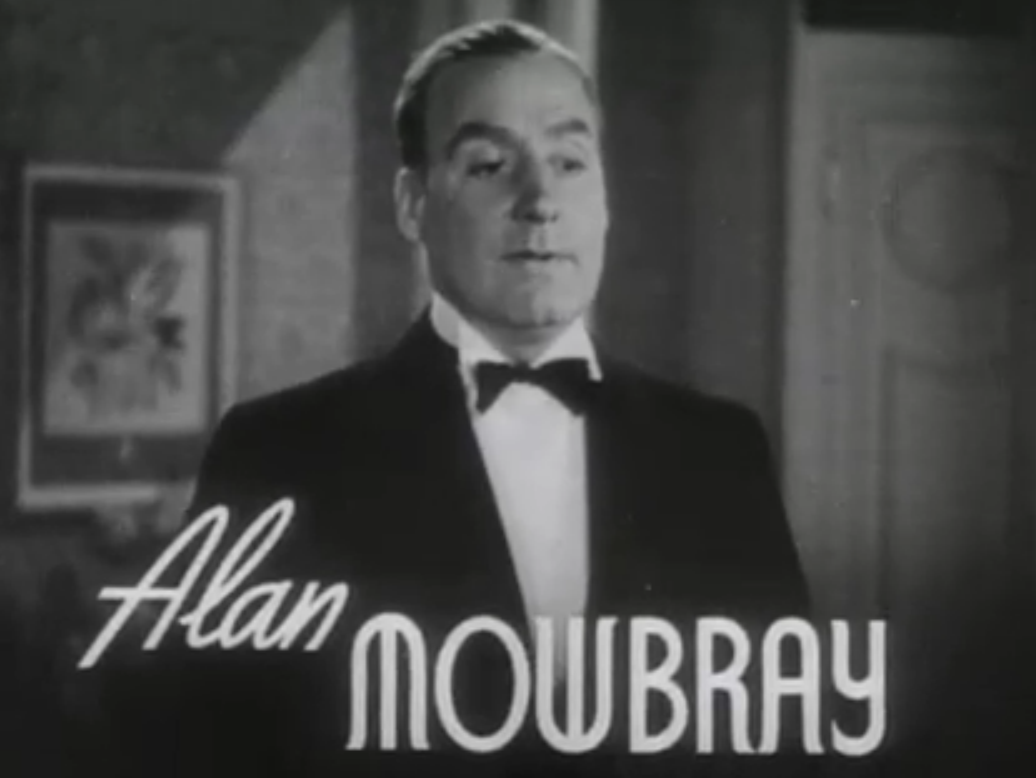
Alan Mowbray

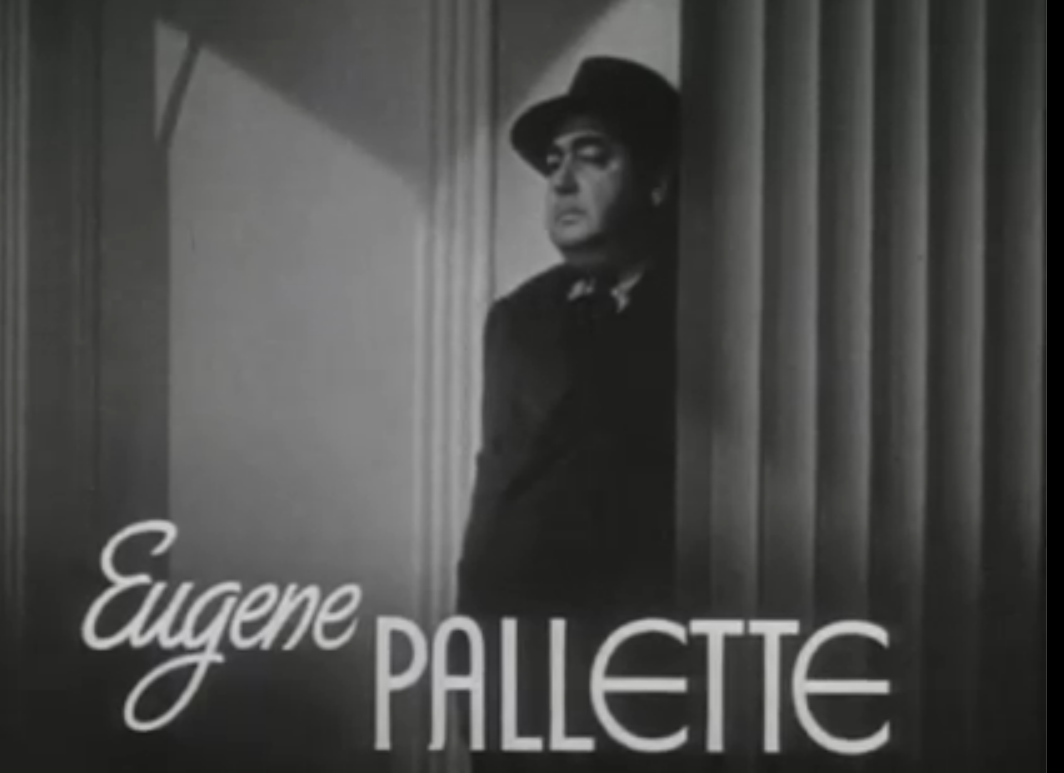
Eugene Pallette

== Production ==
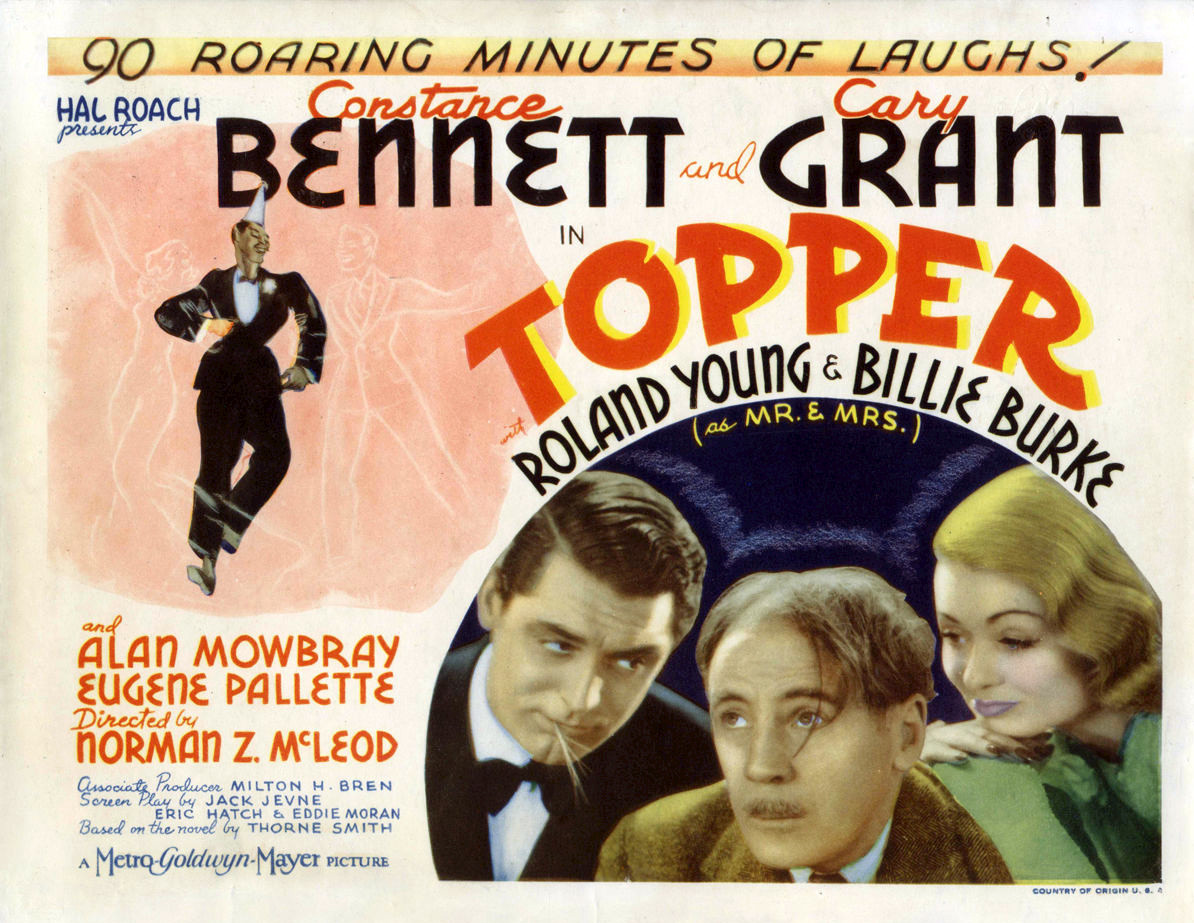

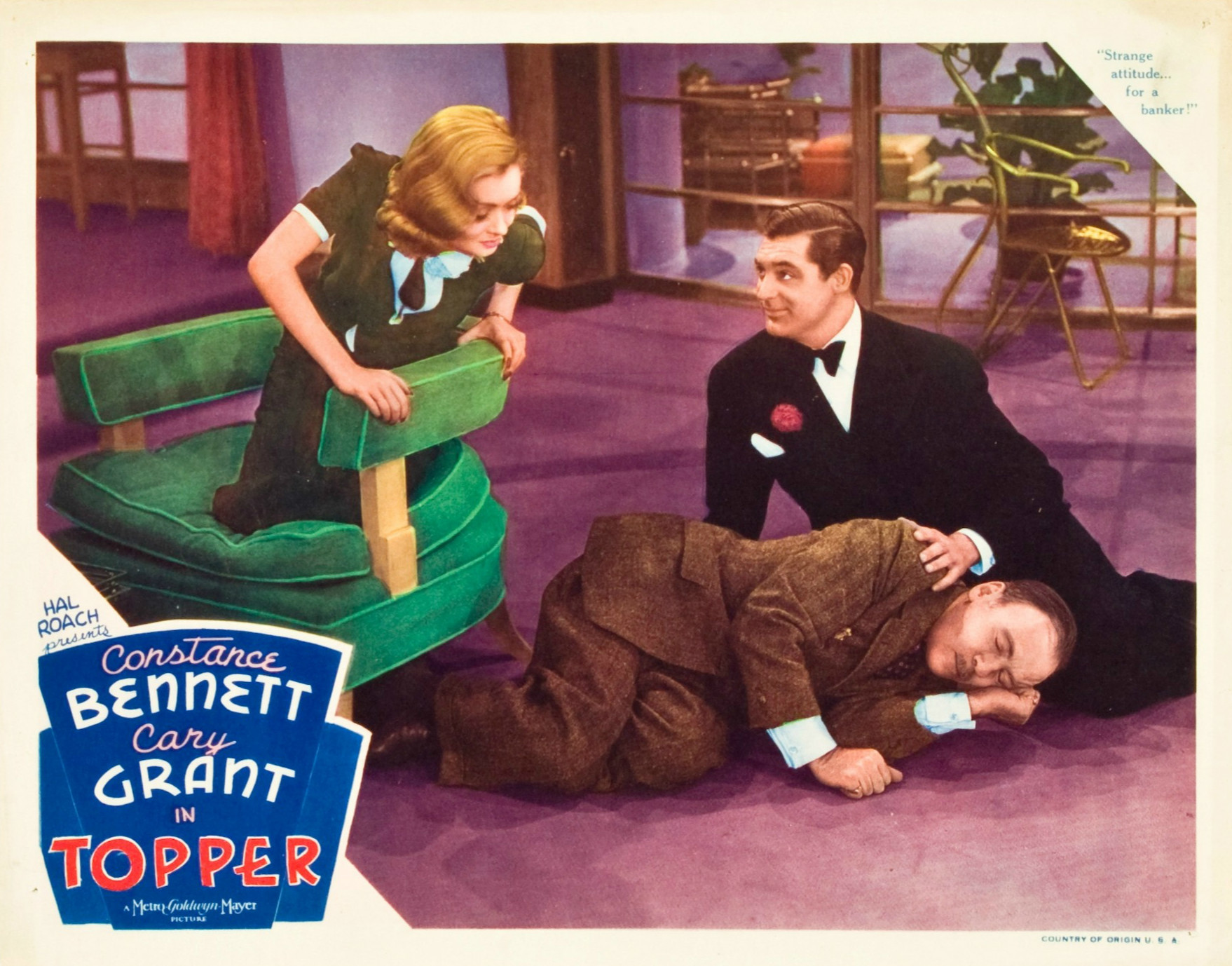

After a long career producing comedy shorts, producer Hal Roach was looking to expand into long-form films to complement his Laurel and Hardy features, and found a property in Topper, a risqué 1926 novel by Thorne Smith (the film is relatively faithful to the first half of the book, but more or less cuts the latter). Roach immediately wanted Cary Grant to play George Kerby, but he had difficulty getting the actor to agree to play the part, since Grant was concerned that the supernatural aspects of the story would not work. Roach was successfully able to pitch the film to Grant as a screwball comedy instead—and a $50,000 payday.

For Grant's opposite number, Roach was interested in Jean Harlow, and W. C. Fields as Topper, but Harlow was on the brink of death, and Fields turned down the offer. When Roach reached out to Constance Bennett, she was impressed enough with the property that she agreed to be paid less than her usual $40,000 fee.

Topper was produced at Hal Roach Studios in Culver City, with location shooting at the entrance to the Bullock's Wilshire department store on Wilshire Boulevard - as the entrance to the "Seabreeze Hotel" - and at a location on San Rafael Avenue in Pasadena, California.

The automobile used by George and Marion Kerby, before they become ghosts, and later by Cosmo Topper - whose own car is a 1936 Lincoln Model K - is a custom-made vehicle with a resemblance to Cord and Duesenberg automobiles of the 1930s. Production models of a Cord were too small to use, so the custom body was built on the chassis of a 1936 Buick Roadmaster by Bohman & Schwartz and the external exhaust pipes characteristic of a supercharged Cord are non-functional; the Buick Roadmaster of the time used an eight-in-line ("straight eight") engine whereas the Cord used a V-8 engine - so external exhaust pipes on both sides of the hood (as per the Cord arrangement) would have meant that at least one side of the car (and probably both) used dummy external pipes. The Buick trunk had special compartments for camera equipment. Afterwards, the car was purchased by the Gilmore Oil Co., who used it for many years for promotional purposes. In 1954, the vehicle was updated utilizing a Chrysler Imperial chassis and drive train.

== Reception ==
=== Critical ===
Modern Screen’s Leo Townsend described the film as "one of the most original and cleverly presented that we've seen for some time" and wrote that the "photographic effects are outstanding - and each one of the occasions when Constance Bennett and Cary Grant fade into thin air is more uproarious than the last". He praised Roland Young for providing most of the laughs and commented, "he steals the show - though this is the widely heralded 'come-back' picture of Constance Bennett. Constance proves that she deserves another chance, however, by giving an excellent performance and looking pretty beautiful besides".

Variety gave a positive review, and described it as "a weird and baffling tale of spiritualism … It is carefully made, excellently photographed, and adroitly employs mechanical illusions and trick sound effects". The performances were also well received : "Cary Grant and Constance Bennett … do their assignments with great skill. Roland Young carries the brunt of the story and does it well."

The Film Daily described the film as "the most novel picture made in a long time" and wrote that the "production is so unorthodox in technique that it will no doubt cause a lot of comment". The review praised it as an "uproarious comedy", and credited the director and the performances of the cast, and predicted, "The picture should do much to re-establish Miss Bennett to her former position as a comedienne."

=== Box office and impact ===
Topper was a box-office hit, and gave a boost to the careers of all the lead actors, in particular Cary Grant, who moved from this film into a sequence of classic screwball comedies such as The Awful Truth (1937), Bringing Up Baby (1938), and Holiday (1938). Constance Bennett, previously known as more of a "clothes-horse" than an actress, received very good notices, and Roach reunited her with director McLeod and screenwriters Jevne and Moran, as well as Billie Burke and Alan Mowbray, in Merrily We Live (1938).

== Awards and honors ==
Topper was nominated for Academy Awards for Best Actor in a Supporting Role for Roland Young - his only nomination - and Best Sound, Recording for Elmer Raguse.

The film is recognized by American Film Institute in these lists:

- 2000: AFI's 100 Years... 100 Laughs - #60
- 2008: AFI's 10 Top 10:
  - Nominated Fantasy Film

== Sequels and adaptations ==
Topper was followed by the sequels Topper Takes a Trip (1938) and Topper Returns (1941).

A television series premiered in 1953 and ran for two seasons (78 episodes). It starred Leo G. Carroll as Topper and Robert Sterling and Anne Jeffreys as the ghosts, who died in an avalanche while skiing. They are accompanied by the ghost of Neil, a St. Bernard dog who died trying to rescue them.

A television pilot for a proposed new series, Topper Returns, was produced in 1973. It stars Roddy McDowall as the nephew of Cosmo Topper (now deceased) and Stefanie Powers and John Fink as the Kerbys, who have transferred their attention to a younger generation. A TV movie remake (and pilot for a new TV series), Topper (1979) was also produced starring Kate Jackson, Jack Warden and Andrew Stevens. According to the article on Nearly Departed, a short-lived American TV series of the 1980s starring Eric Idle of Monty Python fame, it was based on the same premise. John Landis directed another Topper pilot for CBS in 1992, starring Tim Curry as Cosmo Topper, Courteney Cox as Marion Kerby, and Ben Cross as George Kirby, which was not picked up. In 1999, Hugh Wilson was in talks with producer John Davis to direct a remake of Topper but the film was never produced.

== Colorization ==
Topper was the first black-and-white film to be digitally colorized, re-released in 1985 by Hal Roach Studios, with color by Colorization, Inc. The film was chosen because its original 1937 release represented Hal Roach's entry into major feature film production. According to the studio: "In light of this history, it seems fitting that Topper should again be on the cutting edge of change, this time heralding the age of colorization as the first completed color version of a classic black and white motion picture".

== See also ==
- List of ghost films
