= Pleasure Cruise =

1933 film by Frank Tuttle

- Theatrical release poster
- Directed by: Frank Tuttle
- Screenplay by: Guy Bolton
- Starring: Genevieve Tobin; Roland Young; Ralph Forbes; Una O'Connor; Herbert Mundin; Minna Gombell
- Cinematography: Ernest Palmer
- Edited by: Alex Troffey
- Music by: Peter Brunelli
- Production company: Fox Film Corporation
- Distributed by: Fox Film Corporation
- Release date: March 24, 1933
- Running time: 72 minutes
- Country: United States
- Language: English

Pleasure Cruise is a 1933 American Pre-Code comedy film directed by Frank Tuttle and written by Guy Bolton. The film stars Genevieve Tobin, Roland Young, Ralph Forbes, Una O'Connor, Herbert Mundin and Minna Gombell. The film was released on March 24, 1933, by Fox Film Corporation.

== Plot ==
Andrew Poole has lost his wealth in the Depression. Seeing his personal estate going under the auction hammer and with no immediate prospects, he plans to release his fiancée, Shirley, from their engagement. Instead, she insists that they marry immediately and subsist on her salary while he finishes a novel, and Andrew accepts. A year later, she is involved with her work and he is a nagging househusband, consumed by jealousy of her life at the office. When matters come to a head, they agree to separate vacations. Shirley departs on a cruise ship, and Andrew furtively gets a job as the ship's barber in order to spy on (and disrupt) her dealings with other men.

Shirley enjoys a serious flirtation with passenger Richard Orloff and he asks her to leave her cabin unlocked for him on the night of a big party. Tipsy, Shirley accidentally leaves her door unlocked, so Andrew ties Orloff's cabin door shut and slips into his wife's room in the dark. The next morning she is mortified when Orloff apologizes for having been unable to keep the tryst. She also finds her engraved cigarette case missing, and nervously eyes the cases of other passengers, wondering who was in her room.

She decides to return home early, and Orloff arrives at the Pooles' home to visit a few moments before Andrew, making for an awkward meeting, as the two had met on the ship. As Orloff makes his excuses and departs, Andrew flashes the cigarette case and all is made clear. Shirley also catches a glimpse of the case, and- pretending to have known all along that Andrew was on board- coyly advises her husband to knock the next time he enters a lady's room. With that, she disappears into her room, and Andrew knocks.

== Cast ==
- Genevieve Tobin as Shirley Poole
- Roland Young as Andrew Poole
- Ralph Forbes as Richard Orloff aka Taversham
- Una O'Connor as Mrs. Signus
- Herbert Mundin as Henry
- Minna Gombell as Judy Mills
- Theodore von Eltz as Murchison
- Frank Atkinson as Alf
- Robert Greig as Crum
- Arthur Hoyt as Rollins
- George K. Arthur as Bellboy
- Claude King as Sir James Montgomery
- Tyrell Davis as Harry
