= Rollo's Wild Oat =

Comedic play by Clare Kummer

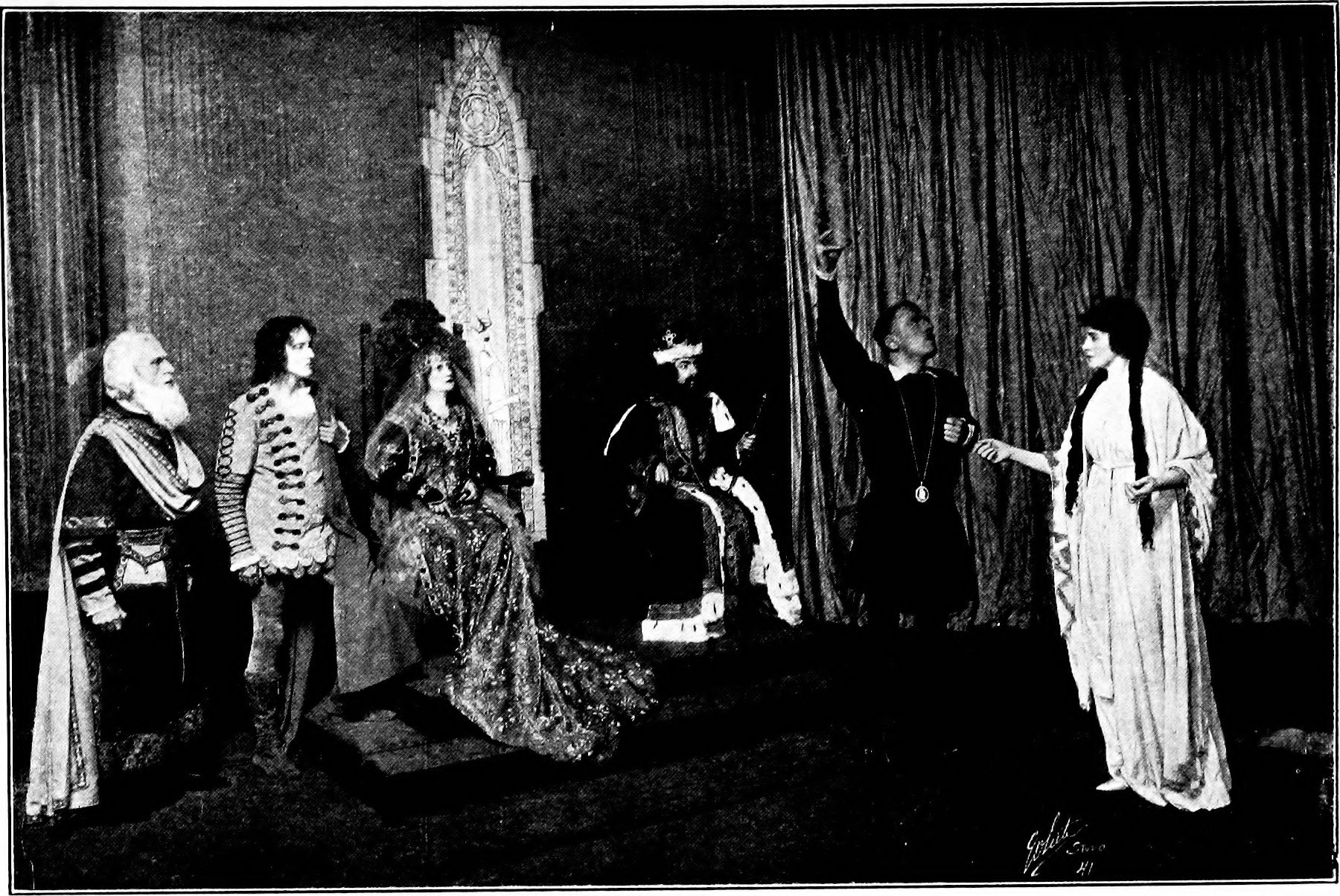
- Scene from the play
- Original language: English
- Written by: Clare Kummer

Premiere
- Date: 23 November 1920
- Place: Punch & Judy Theatre, 49th St., New York

Rollo's Wild Oat is a 1920 comedic play by Clare Kummer.

== Background ==
The play first had some tryout runs, including in upstate New York and Philadelphia in January–February 1920, but a middling reception delayed a planned Broadway debut. Originally slated for the Selwyns, they lost confidence in it and gave it up, and Kummer decided to finance it herself.

The play debuted at the smaller venue 300 seat Punch & Judy Theatre on Broadway on November 23, 1920. It was a decent success and ran into June 1921 for a total run of 228 performances.

Critic Burns Mantle's annual review of plays called it "a smartly written and splendidly entertaining little comedy ... in which Roland Young's performance was highly commended." Alexander Woollcott deemed it "a kind of airy and capricious nonsense which was familiar enough in the best of Oscar Wilde." Writing for New York Tribune, Heywood Broun wrote "the best of it seems to us to be the finest work which Miss Kummer has yet done for the theatre, which means that it is far and away beyond the capacity of any other American writer of light comedy, with the possible exception of Booth Tarkington. Mingled with this is other materials which is distinctly dull." But while Broun believed plot was almost superfluous to Kummer's best writing, the New York Herald found that despite "flashes of that whimsical wit," the play "was suggestive in more ways that one last night of entertaining amateur theatricals" and the "dramatic crisis" of the play was "quite flat." Charles Darnton of the New York World was much kinder, writing that the play "reaped whirlwinds of laughter and won new laurels" for Kummer, and praised Roland Young's performance.

The play was popular in stock productions into the 1940s. The Metropolitan Playhouse put on a revival of the play in 2014.

== Original Broadway cast ==
In order of appearance

- Ivan Simpson as Hewston
- Marjorie Kummer as Lydia
- Roland Young as Rollo Webster
- Dore Davidson as Mr. Stein
- Lotus Robb as Goldie MacDuff
- Edythe Tressider as Mrs. Park Gales
- J. Palmer Collins as Whortley Camperdown
- Manuel A. Alexander as Thomas Skitterling
- Stanley Howlett as George Lucus
- Grace Peters as Aunt Lane
- J.M. Kerrigan as Horatio Webster
- Elinor Cox as Bella

Kummer's daughter Marjorie was in the cast, in her stage debut. She married her castmate Roland Young in 1921.
