= Topper Returns =

1941 film by Roy Del Ruth

- Theatrical release poster
- Directed by: Roy Del Ruth
- Written by: Jonathan Latimer; Gordon Douglas; Paul Gerard Smith (additional dialogue)
- Based on: Characters created by Thorne Smith
- Produced by: Hal Roach
- Starring: Joan Blondell; Roland Young; Carole Landis; Billie Burke
- Cinematography: Norbert Brodine
- Edited by: James Newcom
- Music by: Werner R. Heymann
- Production company: Hal Roach Studios
- Distributed by: United Artists
- Release date: March 21, 1941
- Running time: 88 minutes
- Country: United States
- Language: English
- Budget: $500,000
- Box office: $500,931

Topper Returns (1941) by Roy Del Ruth

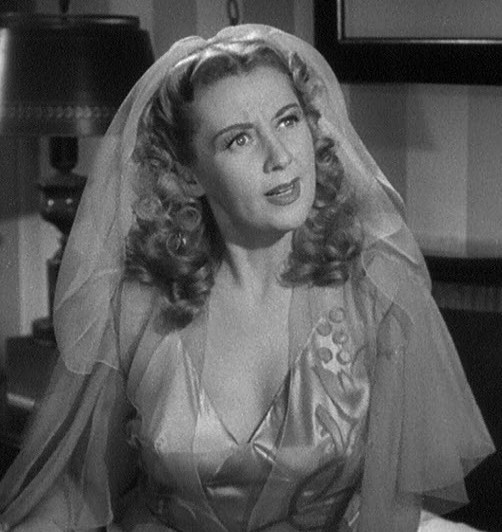
Joan Blondell

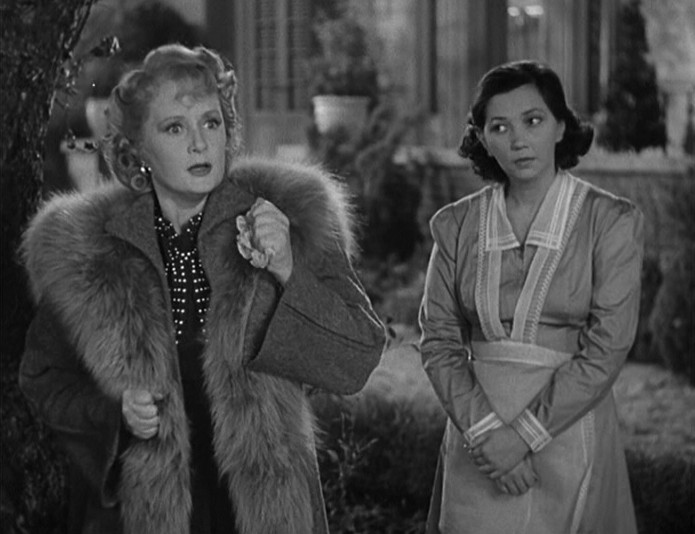
Billie Burke and Patsy Kelly

Topper Returns is a 1941 American supernatural comedy thriller film directed by Roy Del Ruth and starring Joan Blondell, Roland Young, Carole Landis and Billie Burke. The third and final installment in the initial series of supernatural comedy films inspired by the novels of Thorne Smith, it succeeds Topper (1937) and Topper Takes a Trip (1938).

As in the prior films, Young plays Cosmo Topper, a mousy banker who gets into trouble because of his ability to see and speak with ghosts, and Burke plays his wife, who is constantly befuddled by his strange antics. The plot revolves around a murder mystery. Blondell portrays a slain woman who seeks the reluctant Topper and enlists his help in identifying her killer and saving her friend, played by Carole Landis. Most of the action takes place in a spooky mansion filled with eccentric characters, trapdoors and secret passages.

The film was nominated for the Academy Awards for Best Special Effects (Roy Seawright and Elmer Raguse) and Best Sound Recording (Elmer Raguse). A TV series, Topper, premiered in 1953 and ran for two seasons. A pilot called Topper Returns (1973) was later made for a proposed TV series. There was also a made-for-TV remake, Topper, in 1979.

In 1969, Topper Returns entered the public domain in the United States because the claimants did not renew its copyright registration in the 28th year after publication.

== Plot ==
Wealthy young heiress Ann Carrington and her best friend Gail Richards are riding in a speeding taxi driven by Bob, along the coast. A figure dressed all in black, with covered face and hat, aims a rifle with the telescopic sight crosshairs focused on the cab from a distance and shoots out the rear tire. The taxi flips on its side at the edge of a cliff, inches away from having fallen into crashing ocean waves below. Bob, the taxi driver, extracts his passengers from the vehicle and leaves them at the side of the road so he can walk back to a garage they passed.

Ann and Gail try hitchhiking and get passed by the first car. Gail raises Ann's skirt to expose her leg when a second car passes, and the driver ends up crashing into a tree. Next, they block the road by sitting on their suitcases so the next car is forced to stop. In the sports car is banker Cosmo Topper and his chauffeur, Eddie. The two girls brazenly load their luggage and climb into the car. They insist on being driven to Ann's destination, the Carrington mansion. The back seat of the car is loaded with luggage and Ann, so Gail volunteers to ride sitting on Cosmo's lap, ignoring his protests.

As they drive past Topper's house, Mrs. Clara Topper is out front with her maid and waves to the approaching car. She is surprised to see her husband drive past with a young blonde sitting on his lap and distraughtly concludes he is having an adventure. The girls are dropped off at the stately cliff top mansion next door to Topper's residence, where they are received by three creepy staff members, butler Rama, housekeeper Lillian, and another unnamed staff member.

Ann is directed to the study to see her father by the housekeeper, but her friend Gail is to stay behind. Ann is then intercepted by the creepy Dr. Jeris. Dr. Jeris warns Ann that her father, Henry Carrington, is in poor health and takes her to meet her father, who is sitting in a chair with a blanket over his legs. In the conversation, we find that Ann has been raised in the East at her mother's request. Ann has no memories of her father, as they have been separated since her mother and Carrington's business partner died in a cave while inspecting a company mine. Ann's father also reveals that the next day would be Ann's birthday and, according to her mother's will, she is to come into full control of the family fortune.

After leaving her father, Ann and Gail are to be shown upstairs to their rooms. Gail is waiting on the stairs, and as Ann crosses the main hall, a giant chandelier breaks loose from the ceiling. Ann escapes harm because Gail screams in time for Ann to stop and just barely be missed by the chandelier. The girls continue to their rooms. The first room is Gail's, decorated in an Oriental motif. Gail is unimpressed, as they have just returned from living in the East. Ann is then taken to her bedroom, which is spectacularly decorated. Gail discovers the rooms are adjoining. She makes such a fuss about how beautiful the room is that Ann insists that they trade, so Gail sleeps in what was supposed to be Ann's room.

In the middle of the night, a secret panel opens in the bedroom and the masked figure dressed all in black enters the bedroom and opens the windows. Gail is knifed to death as she gets up to shut the window, having been mistaken for Ann.

Gail's ghost separates from her body. Ghost-Gail walks out the window and goes down the road to the Topper's house to find someone who can help solve her murder. She finds Topper and convinces him to come to the Carrington mansion by threatening to create a scandal with his suspicious wife if he doesn't. Topper calls Eddie the chauffeur to get the car ready. Eddie grumbles and protests, but he drives Topper back to mansion. Eddie is unaware of the ghost and experiences a number of puzzles as doors open and shut, cushions depress, voices are heard, footprints appear on the snowy walkways, and so on. Eventually, he gets so scared that he runs away, drives back to the Toppers' house, and starts packing to leave. Mrs. Topper finds him and asks where Cosmo is, then demands to be driven to the house next door to find him. Eddie says he's had it and wants to go back to his former employer, Mr. Benny, but Mrs. Topper bullies him into driving her and Emily the maid to the Carringtons'.

Meantime, Topper, with the guidance of Ghost-Gail, finds the dead body of Gail, and goes downstairs to phone the police, but the phone doesn't work. Dr. Jeris, armed with a pistol, and the three staff members discover him, surround him, and keep him confined. He insists on going up to the bedroom to show them the body, but when they arrive, Gail's body is gone. The doctor and Mr. Carrington treat him as a lunatic. When Ann comes into the room, Topper tries to explain, but the housekeeper finds a note that Gail apparently wrote, saying she has left.

At this point, Mrs. Topper, her maid Emily, and Eddie arrive and insist Topper is in the house as they push their way in to look for him. By this time, it is nearly daylight, and Bob, the taxi driver, shows up at the house to collect his unpaid fare. Ann, who is wondering what happened to Gail, becomes frightened and asks Bob to escort her to her room to get the fare. They go up to the bedroom, where Bob volunteers to wait outside the room. While Ann is in the room, the black dressed assassin appears, but Ann sees him in the mirror, screams, and Bob responds in time to see the black figure escape through the window.

In the following sequences, there are many comings and goings with people disappearing and reappearing by way of concealed stairways and hallways reachable by moving or rotating wall panels. Mrs. Topper uses the phone and calls the police to report her missing husband and innocently mentions there has also been a murder. Soon police detective Roberts, with a squad of officers, comes in and starts asking questions. He gets confused by the conflicting answers and by tricks that Ghost-Gail plays.

Ghost-Gail has Topper hide in the kitchen's walk-in refrigerator. Eventually, Topper is found by his wife, and the bulk of the characters end up in the kitchen. Ghost-Gail lifts a pistol from police detective Roberts’ pocket, forces it on Topper, and manipulates him to lock everyone in the refrigerator. Ghost-Gail and Topper then proceed to look for her body to prove the murder. Eventually, Bob breaks the window in the refrigerator door and lets everyone out of the refrigerator. Ann is kidnapped by the figure in black and is ultimately rescued by Bob, with assistance from Ghost-Gail.

Lillian the housekeeper is eventually proved to be the writer of Gail's note. She admits that she was in on some of the deceptions but had nothing to do with the murder. The lights go out suddenly, Lillian screams, disappears, and is presumed dead. It turns out there is a secret chain in the fireplace that, when pulled, makes the chair in the center of the room tilt backward and dump the occupant into a vertical shaft that leads to a water-filled cave below the mansion.

Eventually, the threads come together. Topper and Ghost-Gail manage to retrieve her body from a small ship a short distance offshore from the water cave. The body is returned to the mansion and, despite the comic total confusion of the detective, Topper states that the killer must have been the person who was standing nearest the fireplace when Lillian was about to talk, and that person was none other than Mr. Carrington.

Mr. Carrington escapes the room and drives off in a car. Ghost-Gail climbs into Topper's sports car in pursuit. Eddie is in the back seat, terrified that the car is being driven at top speed on winding roads with an invisible driver. Mr. Carrington, being followed in hot pursuit, eventually loses control. His car leaves the road and crashes into a tree. He dies and becomes a ghost himself. Before anyone arrives, Ghost-Gail browbeats Ghost-Carrington into writing a letter to Ann, confessing that he is not her father, but her father's business partner. Her father died in the mine together with Ann's mother, and he has been impersonating Carrington in order to kill Ann and keep the fortune for himself.

Ghost-Gail gives the letter to Topper when the other characters arrive at the crash scene, and Topper hands it to Ann. Clara Topper sees that Cosmo was mostly telling the truth about his adventures with the two young ladies, and Bob and Ann comfort each other. Eddie quits, and Clara convinces the maid Emily to drive the Toppers home. Ghost-Gail thanks Eddie for the help, then Ghost-Carrington apologizes for dumping him in the water. This scares Eddie, who runs so fast he passes the Toppers' car.

== Cast ==
- Joan Blondell as Gail Richards
- Roland Young as Cosmo Topper
- Carole Landis as Ann Carrington
- Billie Burke as Mrs. Topper
- Dennis O'Keefe as Bob
- Patsy Kelly as Maid
- H. B. Warner as Mr. Carrington
- Eddie "Rochester" Anderson as Chauffeur
- George Zucco as Dr. Jeris
- Donald MacBride as Sgt. Roberts
- Rafaela Ottiano as Lillian
- Trevor Bardette as Rama
- George Lloyd as Boat Captain (uncredited)
- Brick Sullivan as Darryl, Police Officer (uncredited)
- William O'Brian as Second Butler (uncredited)
- Eddy Chandler as Jim, Police Sergeant (uncredited)

== Reception ==
Rotten Tomatoes gives the film an 89% "fresh" rating based on 9 reviews, and an average of 7/10. Variety said the "[f]ilm begins to miss out when the story veers from its own premise to the level of a conventional mystery farce".

== Preservation ==
Topper Returns was preserved and restored by the UCLA Film and Television Archive. The restoration premiered at the UCLA Festival of Preservation in 2022. Restoration funding provided by the Packard Humanities Institute.

== See also ==
- List of ghost films

== Bibliography ==
- Fetrow, Alan G. Feature Films, 1940-1949: a United States Filmography. McFarland, 1994.
