= The Great Lover (1949 film) =

1949 film by Alexander Hall

- Directed by: Alexander Hall
- Written by: Edmund Beloin; Melville Shavelson; Jack Rose
- Produced by: Edmund Beloin
- Starring: Bob Hope; Rhonda Fleming; Roland Young
- Cinematography: Charles Lang
- Edited by: Ellsworth Hoagland
- Music by: Joseph J. Lilley
- Production company: Paramount Pictures
- Distributed by: Paramount Pictures
- Release date: November 23, 1949
- Running time: 80 minutes
- Country: United States
- Language: English
- Box office: $3.3 million (US rentals)

The Great Lover is a 1949 American comedy film starring Bob Hope, Rhonda Fleming, and Roland Young. In the film, a scout leader takes his troop on an ocean cruise, pursues a beautiful duchess and is stalked by a murderer. It is also known as Easy Does It and My Favourite Redhead.

== Plot ==
In a Paris hotel, two American men drink champagne to celebrate their gambling wins. As the young man boasts, the old man strangles him from behind.

The killer is identified almost instantly because of the signature napkin knot found around the victims throat - the signature of notorious card-playing killer C.J. Dabney. The police know his next victim will fit the pattern: a young American man.

Despite the identification, the American detective Higgins pleads to the French police not to try to apprehend the perpetrator, because he wants to catch Dabney red-handed if possible. Just like Higgins guesses, Dabney soon finds a new victim, a newspaperman from Ohio, Freddie Hunter. Freddie is in Paris escorting eight young boy scouts, the Boy Foresters, but he plans to stay longer in France by deliberately missing the boat ride home to the U.S. He is looking for romance.

As Freddie is leaving the ship, he literally bumps into the beautiful young Duchess Alexandria, and isn't as keen on leaving anymore. He find a bunk with the boys, who are led by the tallest boy, Stanley. The duchess travels with her father, the Grand Duke Maximilian, and their secret hope is to start a new life in the United States, since the family is bankrupt. Dabney, who is also on the ship, offers to introduce the clueless Freddie to the duchess. When Freddie meets Alexandria, he pretends to be a very wealthy man, and instantly falls head over heels for her. She has a few more drinks of champagne than intended and reciprocates his feelings. Freddie engages in a card game with the Grand Duke.

As the scout bugler plays Taps, Freddie has to run from the adult company to reach his bunk in time for lights out. In the morning he is woken by Reveille.

Unaware that Dabney is a cardsharp, Freddie maintains his pose as a millionaire and enters into a running card game with him and Maximilian. Dabney continually deals Freddie a winning hand then deftly changes one card to create a losing hand after Freddie has bet. Freddie cannot smoke, since he has been caught smoking before by the troop-leader. The boy scouts catch him with smoking on the ship, and threaten to reveal this and get Freddie in trouble. They tell him to confess to Alexandria that he is poor.

Freddie finds out that Alexandria doesn't have a penny to her name, and she laughs when she confesses she was going to ask him to lend her $1000. When he unexpectedly wins the card game, he discovers that Dabney has orchestrated the win and confronts him with this. Dabney is about to garotte Freddie when Higgins, who is also on the ship, interrupts, without revealing his identity as a detective. Later, Dabney murders Higgins and removes all evidence against himself, but not before the latter has warned Freddie to steer clear of Dabney. Dabney brings the ship authorities to Higgins' cabin and pretends to discover the murder and frame Freddie.

When Alexandria learns from Dabney that Freddie is a fraud, she makes a fool out of him in front of all the boy scouts. Freddie escapes the murder room and hides in a lifeboat. The boy scouts have a ceremony and the bugler plays the Last Post as they think Freddie has jumped overboard. Little Tommy finds Freddie hiding in the ship's dog kennels and goes to get Alexandria. She believes Freddie when he tells the truth about Dabney, and goes in search of the evidence: a diary that Higgins wrote. Dabney catches her in Higgins' cabin and tries to kill her. Meanwhile, Freddie is lowered on the anchor rope and almost eaten by a shark. When he gets back onboard he intervenes and rescues her from Dabney, becoming her hero of the day. They kiss in front of the boys.

== Cast ==
- Bob Hope as Freddie Hunter
- Rhonda Fleming as Duchess Alexandria
- Roland Young as C.J. Dabney
- Roland Culver as Grand Duke Maximilian
- Richard Lyon as Stanley Wilson
- Gary Gray as Tommy O'Connor
- Jerry Hunter as Herbie
- Jackie Jackson as Joe
- Wright Esser as Steve
- Orley Lindgren as Bill
- Curtis Loys Jackson Jr. as Humphrey
- George Reeves as Williams
- Jim Backus as Higgens
- Marcel Journet as Inspector Ladois
- Jack Benny as himself (uncredited)

== Radio adaptation ==
The Great Lover was presented on Screen Directors Playhouse March 22, 1951. Hope and Fleming starred in the adaptation.
