= A Lady's Profession =

1933 film

- Directed by: Norman Z. McLeod
- Screenplay by: Malcolm Stuart Boylan; Walter DeLeon; Nina Wilcox Putnam
- Starring: Alison Skipworth; Roland Young; Sari Maritza; Kent Taylor; Roscoe Karns; Warren Hymer; George Barbier
- Cinematography: Gilbert Warrenton
- Music by: Sigmund Krumgold; John Leipold
- Production company: Paramount Pictures
- Distributed by: Paramount Pictures
- Release date: March 3, 1933
- Running time: 68 minutes
- Country: United States
- Language: English

A Lady's Profession is a 1933 American pre-Code comedy film directed by Norman Z. McLeod and written by Malcolm Stuart Boylan, Walter DeLeon and Nina Wilcox Putnam. The film stars Alison Skipworth, Roland Young, Sari Maritza, Kent Taylor, Roscoe Karns, Warren Hymer and George Barbier. The film was released on March 3, 1933, by Paramount Pictures.

== Cast ==
- Alison Skipworth as Beulah Bonnell
- Roland Young as Lord Reginald Withers
- Sari Maritza as Cecily Withers
- Kent Taylor as Dick Garfield
- Roscoe Karns as Tony
- Warren Hymer as Nutty Bolton
- George Barbier as James Garfield
- DeWitt Jennings as Mr. Stephens
- Billy Bletcher as Keyhole
- Dewey Robinson as The Colonel
- Edgar Norton as Crotchett
- Ethel Griffies as Lady McDougal
- Claudia Craddock as Miss Snodgrass
- James Burke as Mulroy
- Jackie Searl as The Ship's Bad Boy
