= Clare Kummer =

American dramatist

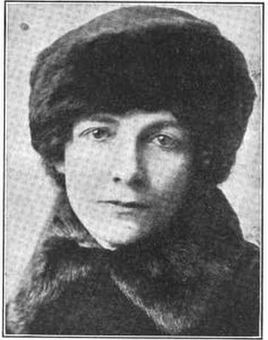
- Clare Kummer, from a 1917 publication.

Background information
- Born: January 9, 1873; Brooklyn, New York, U.S.
- Died: April 21, 1958 (aged 85) Carmel, California, U.S.
- Occupations: Composer, lyricist, playwright
- Spouse(s): Frederick Arnold Kummer (m. 1895; div. 1903), Arthur Henry (m. 1910; wid. 1934)

Clare Kummer (January 9, 1873 – April 21, 1958) was an American composer, lyricist, and playwright.

== Early life ==
Kummer was born Clare Rodman Beecher in Brooklyn, New York, the granddaughter of Rev. Edward Beecher and great-granddaughter of Lyman Beecher. Her great-uncle was Henry Ward Beecher, and her great-aunt was Harriet Beecher Stowe, among other notable members of their family. Her parents were Eugene Francis Beecher and Susan Wood Beecher.

== Career ==
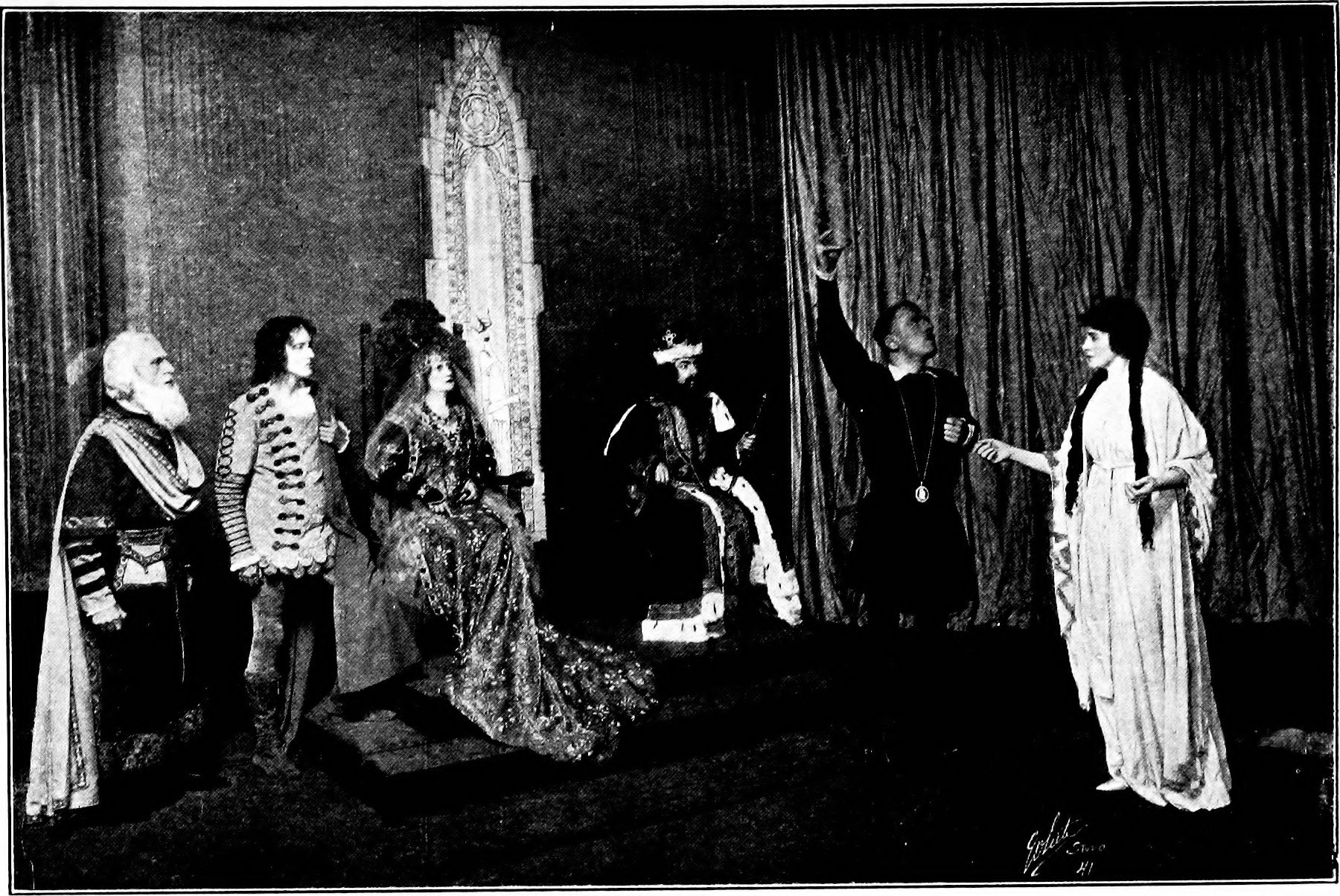
Rollo's Wild Oat: a comedy in three acts (1922)

Kummer wrote songs for musicals in New York beginning in 1903 such as in Sergeant Blue (1905) and A Knight For a Day (1908), before she started writing whole shows, usually musical comedies. Her plays included Noah’s Ark (1906), The Opera Ball (1912), The Choir Rehearsal (1914), Good Gracious, Annabelle (1916-1917), A Successful Calamity (1917), The Rescuing Angel (1917), Be Calm, Camilla (1918), Rollo's Wild Oat (1920), The Choir Rehearsal (1921, one-act), Chinese Love (1921, one-act), The Robbery (1921, one-act), Bridges (1921, one-act), The Mountain Man (1921), Banco (1922), One Kiss (1923), Annie Dear (1924), Madame Pompadour (1924), Pomeroy's Past (1926), So's Your Old Antique (1930), Amourette (1933), Her Master's Voice (1933), Spring Thaw (1938), and Many Happy Returns (1945), "Any one of them had meant to me a gay and frolicsome evening, clever and fresh and full of grace," recalled one critic of Kummer's earlier plays.

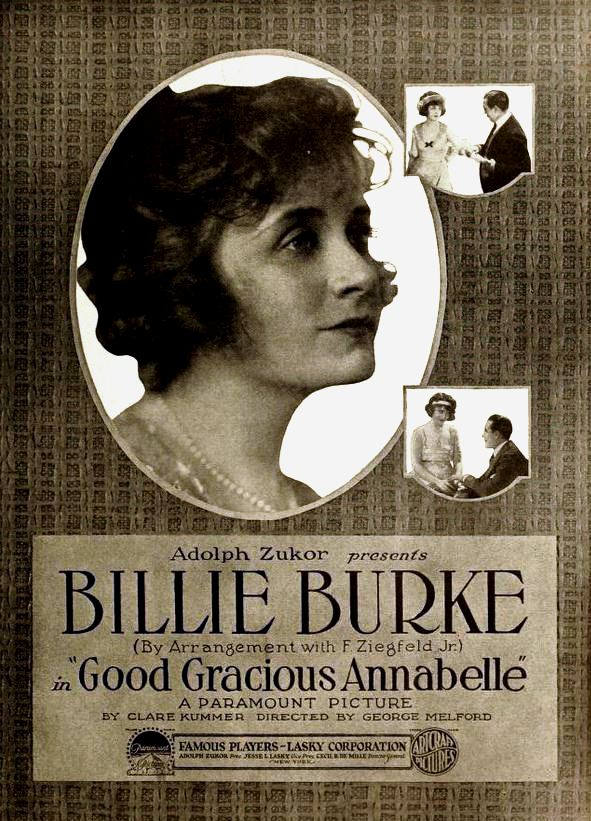
Good Gracious, Annabelle (1919), silent film poster crediting Clare Kummer

She is credited on at least eight films and three television programs, usually the adaptations of her stage shows (including two screen adaptations of Good Gracious, Annabelle, silent in 1919, and sound, as Annabelle's Affairs, in 1931). She also wrote several books, including Bible Rimes for the Not Too Young (1910).

She had one-act plays staged at the Punch & Judy Theatre.

== Personal life ==
Kummer married twice; her first husband was fellow playwright and author Frederick Arnold Kummer. They married in 1895 and divorced in 1903. They had two daughters, Marjorie (who married English actor Roland Young) and Frederica. Her second husband was Arthur Henry; they met through their mutual acquaintance, Theodore Dreiser, and married in 1910. She was widowed when Arthur died in 1934. Kummer died in Carmel, California, at the age of 85, in 1958. Princeton University and the New York Public Library hold some of her papers.
