= Her Master's Voice (play) =

- Written by: Clare Kummer
- Original language: English
- Genre: Comedy
- Setting: Farrars' home living room in Homewood, New Jersey; Aunt Min's home Sleeping porch at Dewellyn

Premiere
- Date premiered: October 23, 1933
- Place premiered: Plymouth Theatre; New York City, New York

Her Master's Voice was a 1933 Broadway two act comedy written by Clare Kummer, produced by Max Gordon and staged by C. Worthington Miner with scenic design created by Raymond Sovey. Roland Young, who played Ned Farrar, was Clare Kummer's son-in-law at the time. The play ran for 224 performances from October 23, 1933 to May 1934 at the Plymouth Theatre.

The play was included in Burns Mantle's The Best Plays of 1933-1934.

== Cast ==
- Roland Young as Ned Farrar
- Frances Fuller as Queena Farrar
- Laura Hope Crews as Aunt Min
- Elizabeth Patterson as Mrs. Martin
- Francis Pierlot as Craddock
- Frederick Perry as Mr. Twilling
- Josephine Williams as Phoebe

== Adaptations ==
The play was presented as a one-hour radio adaptation on Lux Radio Theatre on March 17, 1935. Roland Young reprised his leading role.

It was adapted into the 1936 film Her Master's Voice directed by Joseph Santley and starring Edward Everett Horton and Peggy Conklin with Laura Hope Crews recreating her role as Aunt Min.
