= Topper Takes a Trip =

1938 film by Norman Z. McLeod

- Theatrical poster
- Directed by: Norman Z. McLeod
- Written by: Jack Jevne; Eddie Moran; Corey Ford
- Based on: Topper Takes a Trip; 1932 novel by Thorne Smith
- Produced by: Milton H. Bren; Hal Roach (uncredited)
- Starring: Constance Bennett; Roland Young; Billie Burke
- Cinematography: Norbert Brodine
- Edited by: William Terhune
- Music by: Hugo Friedhofer; Edward Powell
- Distributed by: United Artists
- Release date: December 29, 1938
- Running time: 80 minutes
- Country: United States
- Language: English
- Box office: $565,687

Topper Takes a Trip is a 1938 supernatural film directed by Norman Z. McLeod. It is a sequel to the 1937 film Topper. Constance Bennett, Roland Young, Billie Burke, and Alan Mowbray reprised their roles from the earlier film; only Cary Grant was missing (other than in a few shots taken from Topper). A ghost tries to reunite a couple whom she had a hand in splitting up in the prior film. It was followed by another sequel, Topper Returns (1941). The movie is in the public domain.

== Plot ==
To gain entry to Heaven, ghost Marion Kerby has to do some good on Earth. That means reuniting a divorcing couple, Cosmo and Clara Topper. The story begins with Topper explaining to the court how he met the Kerbys. The courts doesn't believe that the other woman in Topper's life was the deceased Marion Kerby. Marion, who did play a role in the Topper's marital relationship is guilt-ridden and decides to bring them back together. Clara mistakenly thought Marion was Cosmo's mistress. Believing that Cosmo lied to her, Clara leaves with Nancy Parkhurst, a friend for Europe. Marion convince Topper to pursue her to France. Unknown to Marion and Cosmo, Clara has been targeted by a trio of crooks led by Nancy. Marion and Cosmo arrive on the French Riviera and she employs plenty of otherworldly tricks, with the help of a canine spirit named Mr. Atlas to thwart the trio and re-unite the Toppers.

== Cast ==
- Constance Bennett as Marion Kerby
- Roland Young as Cosmo Topper
- Billie Burke as Clara Topper
- Alan Mowbray as Wilkins, Topper's butler
- Verree Teasdale as Mrs. Nancy Parkhurst
- Franklin Pangborn as Louis
- Alexander D'Arcy as Baron de Rossi
- Spencer Charters as Judge
- Irving Pichel as Prosecutor
- Skippy as Mr. Atlas
- William Austin as Roulette Player (uncredited)
- Wade Boteler as Police Sergeant (uncredited)
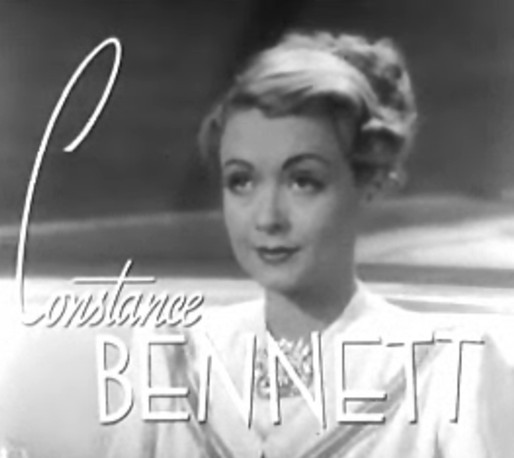
Constance Bennett

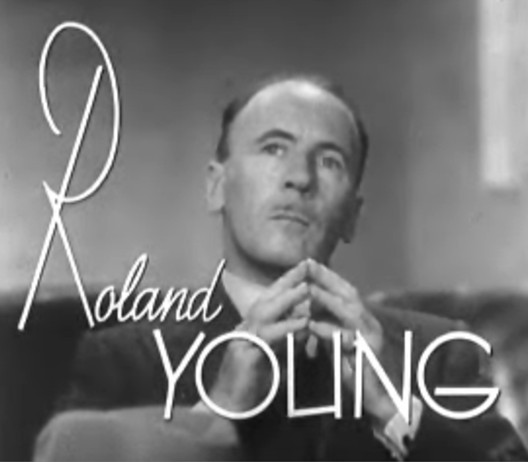
Roland Young

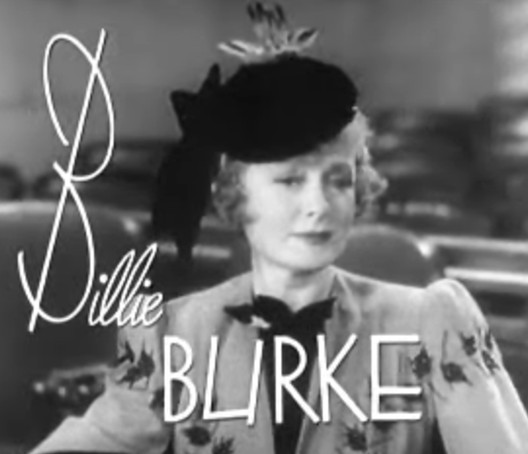
Billie Burke

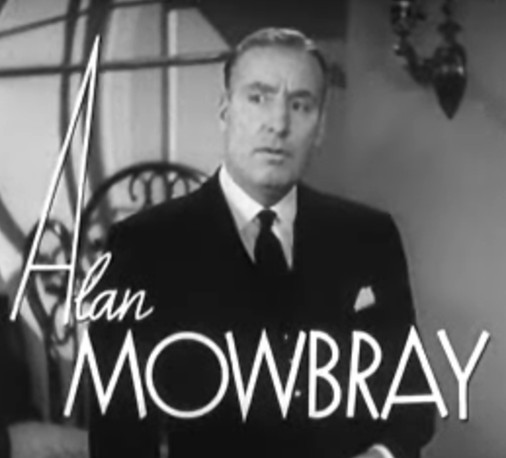
Alan Mowbray

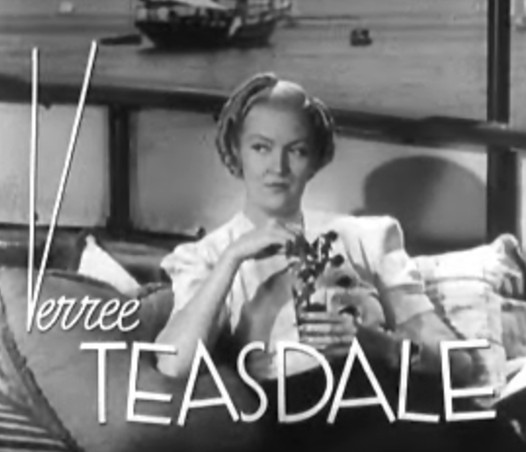
Verree Teasdale

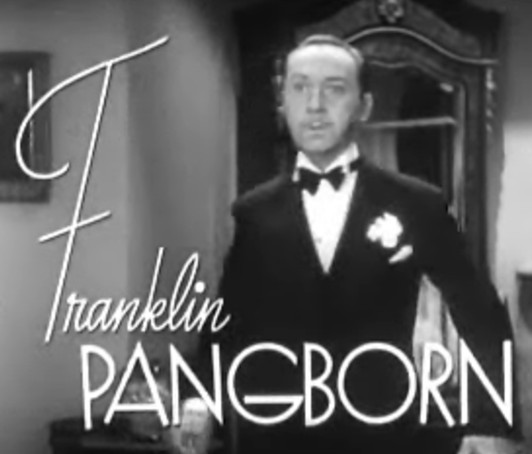
Franklin Pangborn

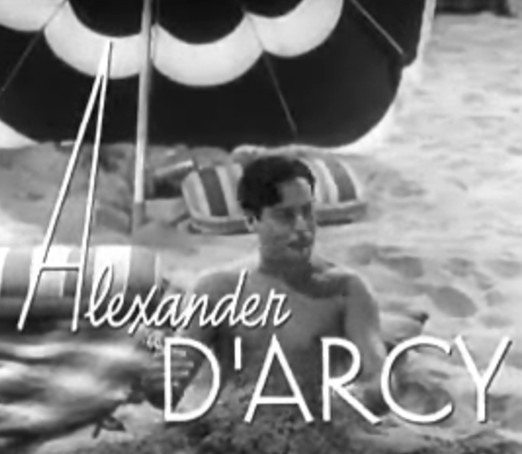
Alexander D'Arcy

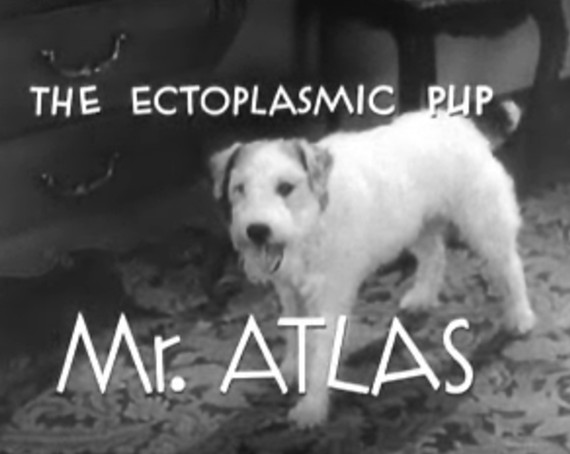
Asta

== Awards ==
The film received one Oscar nomination in 1939 for Best Special Effects for Roy Seawright.

== Preservation ==
Topper Takes a Trip was preserved and restored by the UCLA Film & Television Archive from the 35mm nitrate original picture negative and a 35mm nitrate master positive. Restoration funding was provided by The Packard Humanities Institute. The restoration had its world premiere at the 2024 UCLA Festival of Preservation.

== See also ==
- List of ghost films
