= Annabelle's Affairs =

1931 film

- Jeanette MacDonald, Sally Blane and Joyce Compton
- Directed by: Alfred L. Werker
- Screenplay by: Leon Gordon; Harlan Thompson
- Based on: Good Gracious Annabelle, a 1916 play by Clare Kummer
- Produced by: William Fox; William Goetz
- Starring: Victor McLaglen; Jeanette MacDonald; Roland Young; Sam Hardy
- Cinematography: Charles G. Clarke
- Edited by: Margaret Clancey
- Music by: George Lipschultz
- Production company: Fox Film Corporation
- Distributed by: Fox Film Corporation
- Release date: June 14, 1931
- Running time: 76 minutes
- Country: United States
- Language: English

Annabelle's Affairs is a 1931 American pre-Code romantic comedy film directed by Alfred L. Werker and starring Victor McLaglen, Jeanette MacDonald and Roland Young. The film is based on the 1916-17 play Good Gracious Annabelle by Clare Kummer. It is the only one of MacDonald's films to be considered lost. It was well received by critics, but did not perform well at the box office.

== Plot ==
After they are separated shortly after their marriage, Annabelle doesn't really know what her husband looks like. When they meet later she finds herself falling in love with him, without realizing that they are already married.

== Cast ==
- Victor McLaglen as John Rawson / Hefly Jack
- Jeanette MacDonald as Annabelle Leigh
- Roland Young as Roland Wimbleton
- Sam Hardy as James Ludgate
- William Collier Sr. as Wickham
- Sally Blane as Dora
- Joyce Compton as Mabel
- Ruth Warren as Lottie
- George Beranger as Archie
- Walter Walker as Walter J. Gosling
- Hank Mann as Summers
- Jed Prouty as Bolson
- Louise Beavers as Ruby
- Wilbur Mack as Vance, assistant hotel manager

== See also ==
- List of lost films

== Bibliography ==
- Turk, Edward Baron. Hollywood Diva: A Biography of Jeanette MacDonald. University of California Press, 1998.
