= Norman Z. McLeod =

American film director (1898–1964)

- Born: Norman Zenos McLeod; September 20, 1898; Grayling, Michigan, U.S.
- Died: January 27, 1964 (aged 65); Los Angeles, California, U.S.
- Education: University of Washington
- Occupation: Film director
- Spouse: Evelyn Ward
- Awards: Hollywood Walk of Fame

Norman Zenos McLeod (September 20, 1898 – January 27, 1964) was an American film director.

McLeod's most acclaimed work was made in collaboration with major comic performers of the 1930s, and included such films as the first original Marx Brothers comedies Monkey Business (1931) and Horse Feathers (1932), the most acclaimed W.C. Fields film It's a Gift (1934), the Danny Kaye vehicle The Secret Life of Walter Mitty (1947), and The Paleface starring Bob Hope (1948). He also directed the first two installments of the Topper franchise.

His last directed film was Alias Jesse James (1959). In his later years, McLeod was recruited by writer Rod Serling to direct silent film comedy legend Buster Keaton in the 1961 Richard Matheson-penned "Once Upon a Time" episode of Serling's classic CBS television series The Twilight Zone.

== Personal life ==
He was educated at the University of Washington and spent two years as a fighter pilot in the Army Air Service in France during World War I. He was married to Evelyn Ward, whom he married in 1926, until his death in Toluca Lake, Los Angeles, on January 26, 1964, from a stroke at age 65. McLeod was buried in the Court of Freedom courtyard at Forest Lawn Memorial Park in Glendale, California.

On February 8, 1960, he received a star on the Hollywood Walk of Fame, for his contributions to the motion picture industry at 1724 Vine Street.

== Filmography ==
=== As director ===
- Taking a Chance (1928)
- Along Came Youth (1930)
- Finn and Hattie (1931)
- Monkey Business (1931)
- Touchdown (1931)
- The Miracle Man (1932)
- Horse Feathers (1932)
- If I Had a Million (segments "China Shop" and "Road Hogs", 1932)
- A Lady's Profession (1933)
- Mama Loves Papa (1933)
- Alice in Wonderland (1933)
- Melody in Spring (1934)
- Many Happy Returns (1934)
- It's a Gift (1934)
- Redheads on Parade (1935)
- Here Comes Cookie (1935)
- Coronado (1935)
- The Milky Way (1936, uncredited)
- Early to Bed (1936)
- Pennies from Heaven (1936)
- Mind Your Own Business (1936)
- Topper (1937)
- Merrily We Live (1938)
- There Goes My Heart (1938)
- Topper Takes a Trip (1938)
- Remember? (1939)
- Little Men (1940)
- The Trial of Mary Dugan (1941)
- Lady Be Good (1941)
- Jackass Mail (1942)
- Panama Hattie (1942)
- The Powers Girl (1943)
- Swing Shift Maisie (1943)
- The Kid from Brooklyn (1946)
- The Secret Life of Walter Mitty (1947)
- Road to Rio (1947)
- Isn't It Romantic (1948)
- The Paleface (1948)
- Let's Dance (1950)
- My Favorite Spy (1951)
- Never Wave at a WAC (1953)
- Casanova's Big Night (1954)
- Public Pigeon No. 1 (1957)
- Alias Jesse James (1959)
