= Gladney Center for Adoption =

The Gladney Center for Adoption in Fort Worth, Texas, US, provides adoption and advocacy services. Following its 1880s origins, when it focused on locating homes for orphans during a period of mass migration. It evolved into lobbying, international adoptions, counseling, maternity services, education and philanthropy.

== History ==
=== Early history ===
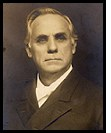
Rev. IZT Morris

The history of the center can be traced back to 1887. Fort Worth was established in 1849 and became the center's home, at the close of the Mexican–American War. By 1886, the Texas and Pacific Railway was operating and at least four stockyards were in service close to the railroad lines. The trains brought migrants from the southeast and, in 1887, the first "Orphan Train" from the northeast. The Orphan Train Movement transported roughly 200,000 children from the northeast throughout the Midwest and as far west as Texas.

Reverend IZT Morris (born Spalding Co, Georgia, March 21, 1847), a Methodist circuit minister, began locating homes for children who had reached the end of the line in Fort Worth. He and his wife Isabella took in many children while trying to identify permanent homes for them among local residents and slowly began the Texas Children's Home Society. It was formally chartered in 1896 and incorporated in 1904 as The Texas Children's Home and Aid Society.

In 1906, a house was purchased by the board of directors on Avenue H in the city of Fort Worth. The purpose was to house children until they could be placed with a permanent family. Reverend Morris was the State Superintendent, fundraiser and chairman of the board of directors until his death in 1914. Reverend Morris was responsible for finding homes for some 1000 children. Isabella ("Belle") succeeded him and supervised the society until 1924.

Texas Home & Aid Society Charter board of directors
J.B. Baker	J.C. Conner	H.H. Halsell	G. H. Mulkey
J.N. Brown	J.V. Dealey	J. Lee Johnson	J.W. Robbins
William Bryce	Irby Dunklin	E.H. McCuistion	L. A. Suggs
E.R. Conner	H.B. Francis	Rev. Morris	R.M. Wynne

Edna Gladney (née Edna Browning Kahly, January 22, 1886) joined the Texas Children's Home and Aid Society's board of directors in 1910. By 1927, she had been named superintendent. She widened the scope of services to include the needs of unwed mothers and provided adoption services for their babies. In 1949 she convinced the board of directors to purchase a small hospital, the West Texas Maternity Home, so that these women could receive medical care throughout their pregnancies and have a private place to deliver their babies. The Texas Children's Home and Aid Society also operated a Baby Home where infants were cared for until they were adopted.

Gladney served as superintendent for 33 years. In recognition of her continued contribution, in 1950 the board of directors renamed the agency The Edna Gladney Home. She continued as director until 1959 when failing health forced her into semi-retirement. She died in Fort Worth in 1961.

=== 1960–1985 ===
Ruby Lee Piester took over Gladney's post. Throughout the 1960s and 1970s, Gladney's maternity services programs expanded. In 1970, Gladney's campus in Fort Worth included an on-campus middle school and high school operated by the Fort Worth Independent School District, with dormitories, hospital facilities and a career-development program and apartment living center for older women. Services were intended to meet residents' physical and emotional needs with an emphasis on providing a non-judgmental environment where these women were encouraged to think positively about their future and that of their offspring.

During this period, the Home's residential facilities could accommodate up to 150 women, included a chapel, swimming pool, miniature golf course and provided both traditional school environments for middle school and high school students and a GED preparation and testing program. Career development and counseling services were available. The programs were licensed by the Texas Health and Human Services. All programs were offered free of charge to young women planning adoption.

Ruby Lee Piester joined the Home in 1960 as director of social services and was executive director from 1963 to 1983. During that time she supervised the placement of 7,800 babies. She and her husband did not have children. Piester died in 2003 and is buried at the Arwine Cemetery in Hurst, Texas.

In the 1970s, services were again expanded to include women living in the community in addition to residents. Believed to be the first of its kind in the country, Gladney offered a free crisis pregnancy telephone hotline in 1976. During her tenure, Piester pioneered an adoption program that identified adoptive parents for children born with special medical needs.

For the Home's Centennial Celebration in 1987, First Lady Barbara Bush, a Gladney "grandparent", celebrated the occasion with the agency as a special guest.

=== 1990-present ===
Michael J. McMahon was named president in 1988, the first adoptive parent to hold the post. In 1991, the board of directors officially changed the name of the institution to the Gladney Center for Adoption to reflect its expanded services.

During McMahon's tenure the center launched three new adoption programs: New Beginnings, which places children from Texas foster care with permanent families; the ABC program, Gladney's infant adoption program centered on meeting the needs of African American and biracial children; and its international adoption program in 1992. The first international "Gladney Baby" went home in March 1994 from Shanghai, China. Gladney celebrated its 1,000th international placement in 2002.

McMahon announced the sale of Gladney's campus on Hemphill St in Fort Worth to the Fort Worth Independent School District in June 1999. Groundbreaking for the new campus took place in October 2000. The agency moved to its present location in southwest Fort Worth in 2002. The campus includes a Visitor Center and Adoption Museum, a counseling center, dormitory, recreational facilities, educational space, career counseling and administrative offices. By the time of his retirement in 2008, McMahon had supervised the placement of 6,674 children from the US and around the world into permanent families.

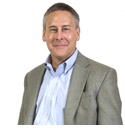
Frank Garrott

Frank R. Garrott was named chief operating officer in 2007, taking over day-to-day operations. Before becoming COO, Garrott was on the board of directors of the Gladney Fund from 1997 to 2006. In 2008, Garrott was named president and CEO.

Like his predecessor, Garrott is a Gladney adoptive parent. After a career in business consulting and banking with PricewaterhouseCoopers, Citibank and Bank One, he decided to focus on Gladney. He serves on the board of the Christian Mission for the United Nations Community and recently joined the board of directors of the Joint Council on International Children's Services and Children's Home Society of America.

Frank Garrott, who had an extraordinary record of success furthering the Gladney mission, announced his decision to retire in October 2017.

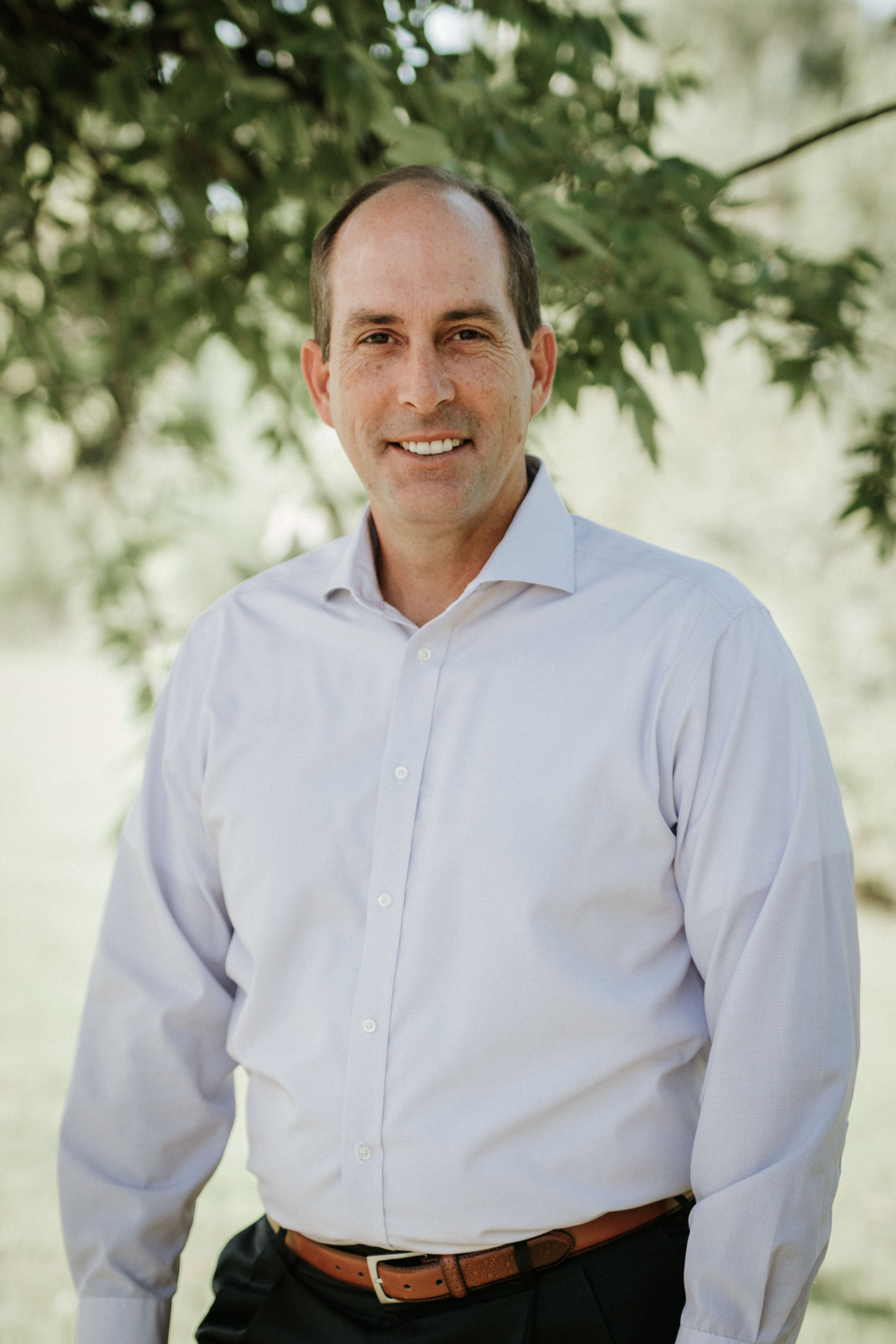
Mark Melson

On December 1, 2017, the Gladney Center of Adoption announced the appointment of Mark Melson to be the institution's president and CEO. Gladney's then board chairman Christopher Dezzi said Melson's presence as a current and established Gladney leader offered a unique opportunity for a seamless transition to the position. Like his predecessors, Melson is also a Gladney adoptive parent.

In 2021, Gladney voiced support for adult adoptee access to their Original Birth Certificates in response to proposed legislation in Texas.

2025-2026 Board of Directors
Stephanie Perdue, Chair
Jeremy Tilley, Chair-Elect
Roger Metz, Past Chair
Chris Gaspar, Secretary
John Covington, Treasurer
Mark Melson, President & CEO
Cary Butcher
Michelle Coady
Chris Dezzi
Mary Beth Dudley
Eliza Gaines
Duke Greenhill
Chris Jamail
Robin Kochel
Mark McLeland
Anu Partap
Kris Simpson
John Thrailkill

== Advocacy ==
Beginning with Reverend Morris' commitment to finding homes, not just employment, for children, Gladney has had a history of advocacy. Edna Gladney led two major initiatives resulting in significant changes to adoption practices. In 1936, she convinced the Texas legislature to remove the word "illegitimate" from birth certificates. Her efforts led Texas to issue second birth certificates in the names of adoptive parents.

In 1951, she convinced the legislature to grant adopted children the same inheritance rights as biological children. She argued successfully that these children should be legally adopted rather than placed in long-term guardianship, as was the practice at the time. She became known within the Texas legislature as "that Gladney woman".

Piester also became well known for advocacy. She is credited with launching the first Child Welfare Advisory Board for Regional Licensing, which was established in Fort Worth for the State Department of Public Welfare. She represented the State of Texas on committees including the Texas Governor's Committee to Promote Adoption, the Governor's Commission for Children and Youth, the State Advisory Committee on Child Care Facilities and the Texas Association of Licensed Maternity and Adoption Services.

In 1980, Piester co-founded the National Committee for Adoption (NCFA, now the National Council for Adoption) to focus on adoption advocacy. Despite opposition from adoption advocates across the country, a Draft Model State Adoption Act was published in February 1980 that would permit adoption records to be opened without regard to promises of privacy or confidentiality. NCFA's first official campaign worked to revise the law to better serve all parties.

The Gladney Center supported the Texas Voluntary Registry, which enables adult adopted children and birth families to make contact, or "match", when both parties enroll in the registry.

== Awards and recognition ==
After an MGM publicist and his wife adopted a child from the Texas Children's Home and Aid Society he presented Mrs. Gladney's life story to then head of Metro-Goldwyn-Mayer, Louis Mayer. Her life's work was the foundation for the 1941 film, Blossoms in the Dust. Greer Garson played Gladney and Walter Pidgeon played her husband Sam. Blossoms in the Dust was in the top ten films of 1941 and was nominated for four Academy Awards — Best Picture, Best Actress, Color Cinematography and Color Interior Decoration, winning the Oscar for Color Interior Decoration. Gladney was paid $5,000 for story rights, which she donated to the society.

In 1953, she appeared on the television show This Is Your Life, where she was honored for a career that oversaw the permanent placement of more than 10,000 children. Texas Christian University, in Fort Worth, granted her an honorary Doctor of Laws degree in 1957.

The National Council for Adoption named its Washington, D.C., headquarters after Piester (named the Ruby Lee Piester Center) in 1995. The then Texas Governor George W. Bush asked her to serve on a special committee to improve the Texas foster care system, and she was inducted into the Texas Women's Hall of Fame.

In April 1991, Piester was inducted into the Adoption Hall of Fame by the National Committee for Adoption (now NCFA) and honored for 35 years of dedication to the adoption cause.

Senator Kay Bailey Hutchison of Texas nominated McMahon for the Angels in Adoption award in 2008. The Congressional Coalition on Adoption Institute (CCAI) honored him at an awards ceremony in Washington, D.C., on September 16, 2008.

In 2007, the Gladney Center for Adoption was among the first US adoption agencies accredited by the Council on Adoption as a "Hague-compliant" agency. The Hague Convention protects against unethical, unlawful and inhumane adoption practices among adoption providers by establishing a set of standards for countries involved in international adoption.

The National Council for Adoption inducted the Gladney Center into its Adoption Hall of Fame in 2012.

== Fundraising ==
Reverend Morris was known as "the man with the basket". Reportedly, local railroad officials provided him with free rail passes. Gladney placed milk bottles in local retail shops for donations.

The first Gladney Auxiliary was formed in 1952 in Houston. The Dallas Auxiliary was established in 1953 and together these organizations raised a $600,000 endowment. The Fort Worth Auxiliary was formed in 1964 and held its first fundraiser, the Blossoms in the Dust Luncheon, in 1965. The 47th Luncheon was held in 2011. Over time, the Auxiliaries evolved to provide volunteers, fundraising and support to Gladney adoptive families and were later renamed Gladney Family Associations. Today, there are 18 Gladney Family Associations across the US.

The Gladney Fund was established in 1992 to raise and manage funds. In 1999, a group of volunteers hosted the inaugural Gladney Cup charity golf event at Colonial Country Club, the Cup's home course. Since that time, six events have been hosted at U.S. Open golf courses throughout the US.

In 2019, the Gladney Center reported total revenue of $9,973,000, with $2,026,000 of that revenue contributed by its endowment and $4,984,000 from adoption fees. Its expenses totalled $9,859,000, including $840,000 spent on fundraising and $4,817,000 on adoption programs. At the end of 2019, it reported assets totalling $12,208,000. As of August 31, 2019, the Gladney Center reported its endowment has a value of more than $24,000,000.

In December 2019, the Gladney Center purchased adoption.com and its assets, including "more than 900 adoption-related URLs, 75 adoption-related sites, two adoption apps and numerous social media sites." The founder of adoption.com, Nathan Gwilliam, will become a vice president and member of the Gladney executive team as part of the transaction.

== Services ==
Gladney provides adoption programs, maternity services, home study services, preparation and training for adoptive families, counseling and support, adoption education and advocacy and humanitarian aid.

=== Adoption programs ===
- Infant adoption provides permanent, homes for newborns and toddlers of all races and backgrounds born in the United States.
- New Beginnings provides adoptive families for children currently available for adoption and waiting in the Texas state foster care system, and for children born with special medical needs.
- International adoption unites adoptive parents with children born in Africa, Asia, Eastern Europe or Latin America.

=== Maternity services ===
- Pregnancy support hotline for women experiencing unplanned pregnancy
- Residential and community-based programs for women planning adoption
- Counseling and support
- Educational and career development opportunities
- Lifetime post-adoption support and counseling

=== Family training and support ===
- Home study services
- Pre-adoption training and preparation classes
- Specialized training and support for families adopting older or special needs children
- Specialized training for families adopting children from foster care
- Lifetime post-adoption support and counseling
- Parent-to-parent support through Gladney Family Associations (GFA)

=== Adoption education and advocacy ===
- Adoption awareness and training for the community
- Adoption awareness and training for healthcare and social work students and professionals
- Community partnerships with pregnancy resource centers and health care facilities
- Participation in advocacy organizations including National Council for Adoption (NCFA), Joint Council on International Children's Services, Counsel of Accreditation, Texas Alliance of Child and Family Services, Children's Home Society of America, American Academy of Adoption Attorneys

=== Fundraising and philanthropy ===
- Annual fundraising events sponsored by GFAs
- Bi-annual Gladney Cup
- Philanthropic initiatives provide adoption education, and support children who will not be adopted in the US and other countries where Gladney works
- Humanitarian initiatives in four key areas: Quality of Life, Transition Programs for Older Orphans, Volunteer Service Trips, Emergency Relief/Special Projects
