= Another Romance of Celluloid =

- Film title card
- Directed by: Herman Hoffman
- Starring: Freddie Bartholomew; Frank Capra; William H. Daniels; Clark Gable; Myrna Loy; Louis B. Meyer; Robert Morley; John M. Nickolaus; Luise Rainer; Bill Reilly; Norma Shearer; Spencer Tracy; Louise Treadwell; W.S. Van Dyke
- Narrated by: Frank Whitbeck
- Music by: Edward Ward
- Distributed by: MGM
- Release date: 1938
- Running time: 11 minutes
- Country: United States

Another Romance of Celluloid is a 1938 short documentary film, narrated by Frank Whitbeck, which goes behind the scenes to look at how film is developed and processed. The film was produced as a follow-up to the studio's Romance of Celluloid (1937).

== Synopsis ==
The film starts with a brief reprise of the previous film, before cutting to the Metro-Goldwyn-Mayer Studios in Culver City, California where assistant cameraman Bill Reilly picks up the film from the lab for Marie Antoinette (1938) which he passes on to cameraman William H. Daniels. Behind the scenes footage shows W.S. Van Dyke directing a scene between Norma Shearer and Robert Morley before the negative is taken to the lab to be developed, dried and polished by lab technician John M. Nickolaus. The test strips are then read and delivered to the print room for printing. A tram takes the viewer on a quick tour of the studio complete with behind the scenes footage of George B. Seitz directing Judge Hardy's Children (1938), Freddie Bartholomew training with elephants for the then unproduced Kim, Luise Rainer doing a costume test for The Toy Wife (1938), and candid footage of Clark Gable, Myrna Loy and Spencer Tracy. The film concludes with a montage from trailers for coming MGM pictures and footage of Louis B. Mayer, Frank Capra, Luise Rainer and Louise Tracy at the 10th Academy Awards banquet.

== Production ==
The film was shot on location at the Metro-Goldwyn-Mayer Studios in Culver City, California.
