= Jack Dawn =

American make-up artist (1891–1961)

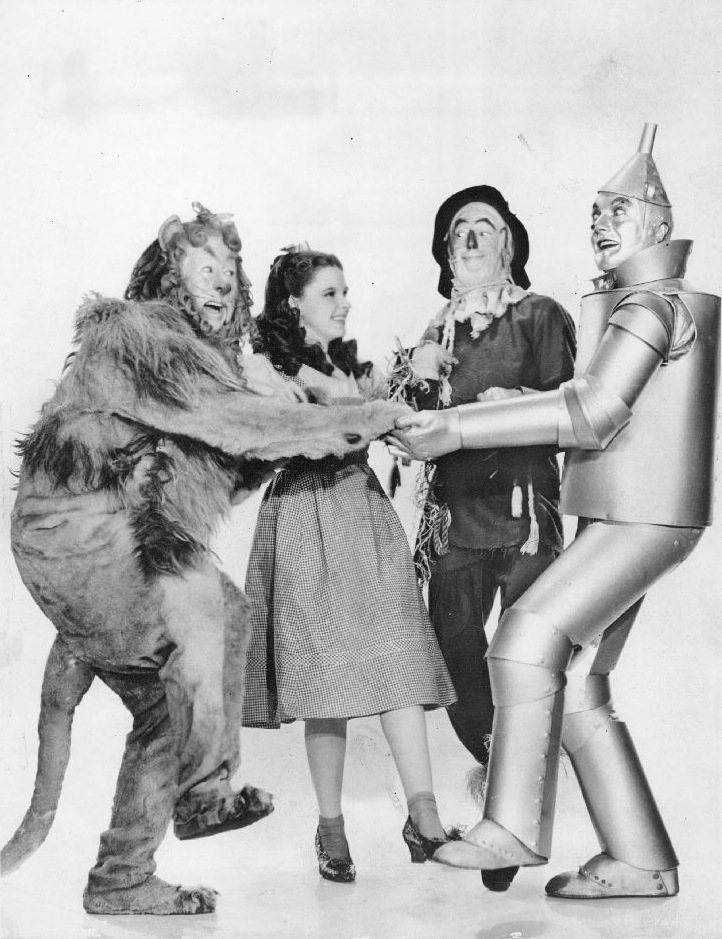
Publicity photo of American entertainers; (L–R) Bert Lahr, Judy Garland, Ray Bolger, and Jack Haley promoting the Sunday, March 15, 1970 NBC broadcast of the 1939 MGM feature film The Wizard of Oz.

John Wesley Dawn (February 17, 1890 – June 20, 1961) was an American make-up artist whose career spanned 37 years and over 200 films.

== Life and career ==
John ‘Jack’ Dawn was born in Covington, Kentucky to John Henry Dawn and Marla Shelton Dawn.

As a boy on a Kentucky farm, Dawn chopped faces in sandstone he found on the banks of a nearby creek, using a chisel, hammer and spoon. He eventually gravitated to Hollywood, where he found work as an extra, portraying an Indian brave for $3 a day. He served with the British during World War I, then returned to the American film capital to work as a make-up assistant and part-time actor at Universal Pictures. One of his first creations was a stiff, uncomfortable mask he wore in the role of an ape in 1925. In order to make masks that were more elastic and lifelike, he began to experiment with a variety of materials. After nine years of research while working at Metro-Goldwyn-Mayer, he developed a synthetic plastic he called vinylite resin' for which he received a patent. Its first application was to create the Chinese faces for the mostly white cast of The Good Earth in 1937.

Two years later, he was assigned the task of giving life to three non-human characters—a scarecrow, a tin man, and a lion—in MGM's classic musical film The Wizard of Oz. He also created the green makeup for Wicked Witch of the West, played by Margaret Hamilton; multiple looks for Frank Morgan, who played five different characters in the film; and make-up effects for the Munchkins.

In 1943, he approached the San Diego Naval Hospital with an offer to help World War II soldiers whose faces and hands were disfigured in battle. He created inlays that helped them appear more natural between multiple plastic surgery procedures.

Dawn worked with many legendary Hollywood performers, including Laurel and Hardy, Greta Garbo, Mickey Rooney, Judy Garland, Bert Lahr, Ray Bolger, Jack Haley, Greer Garson, Clark Gable, Spencer Tracy, Katharine Hepburn, Lucille Ball, Ingrid Bergman, Elizabeth Taylor, Frank Sinatra, Gene Kelly, Ginger Rogers, Lana Turner, Fred Astaire, and Betty Hutton.

His sons Robert Dawn and John Wesley ‘Wes’ Dawn was also a make-up artist as was his grandson Jeff Dawn.

He died in Glendale, California, five years after retiring from films. He was buried in an unmarked grave in Glendale's Forest Lawn Memorial Park Cemetery.

== Notable credits ==
- Maytime (1937)
- A Christmas Carol (1938)
- Love Finds Andy Hardy (1938)
- The Wizard of Oz (1939)
- Ninotchka (1939)
- Pride and Prejudice (1940)
- The Philadelphia Story (1940)
- Blossoms in the Dust (1941)
- Dr. Jekyll and Mr. Hyde (1941)
- Woman of the Year (1942)
- For Me and My Gal (1942)
- Random Harvest (1942)
- Du Barry Was a Lady (1943)
- Gaslight (1944)
- National Velvet (1944)
- Meet Me in St. Louis (1944)
- Thirty Seconds Over Tokyo (1944)
- The Picture of Dorian Gray (1945)
- Anchors Aweigh (1945)
- Week-End at the Waldorf (1945)
- The Harvey Girls (1946)
- The Postman Always Rings Twice (1946)
- The Yearling (1946)
- Easter Parade (1948)
- Little Women (1949)
- Neptune's Daughter (1949)
- The Stratton Story (1949)
- The Barkleys of Broadway (1949)
- That Midnight Kiss (1949)
- Madame Bovary (1949)
- In the Good Old Summertime (1949)
- On the Town (1949)
- Annie Get Your Gun (1950)
- The Asphalt Jungle (1950)
- Father of the Bride (1950)

== See also ==
- Fred Phillips (makeup artist)
- yellowface
