= Jeanette MacDonald on screen and stage =

Media credits for Jeanette MacDonald

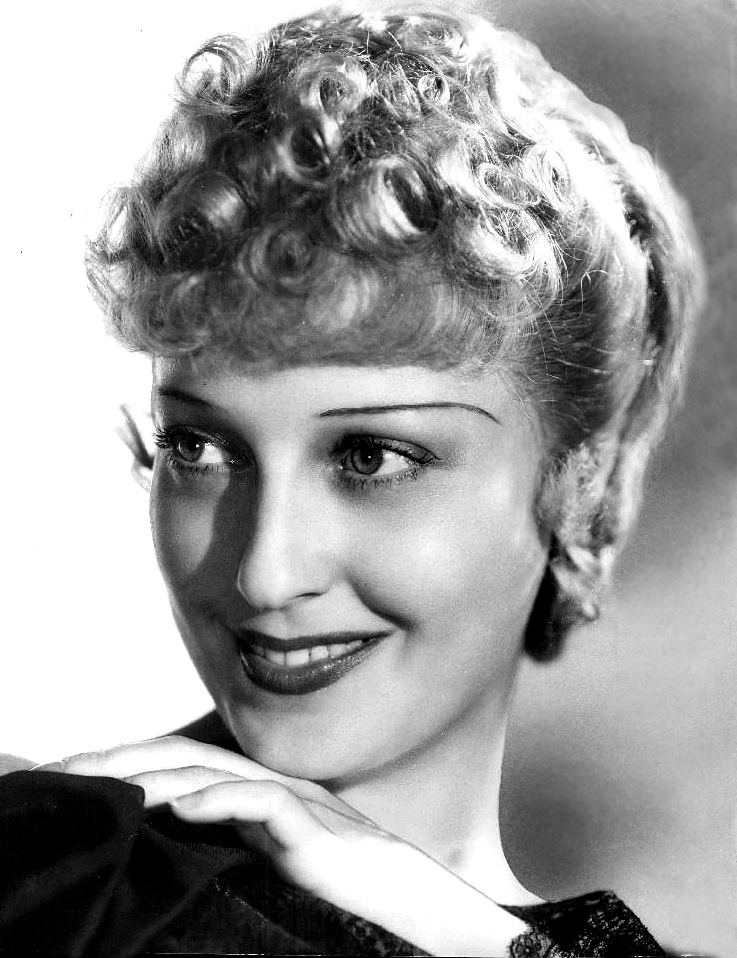
MacDonald in a promotional photo for The Merry Widow (1934).

The following features lists of the film, television and stage performances of actress and singer Jeanette MacDonald (1903–1965). She is best remembered for her musical films of the 1930s with Maurice Chevalier (The Love Parade, Love Me Tonight, The Merry Widow and One Hour With You) and Nelson Eddy (Naughty Marietta, Rose-Marie, and Maytime), but she starred in 29 feature films between 1929 and 1950, from operas to dramas to romantic comedies.

== Filmography ==
Year	Title	Role	Notes	Ref.
1929	The Love Parade	Queen Louise of Sylvania		
1930	The Vagabond King	Katherine		
1930	Let's Go Native	Joan Wood		
1930	Monte Carlo	Countess Helena Mara		
1930	The Lottery Bride	Jenny		
1930	Oh, For a Man!	Carlota Manson		
1931	Don't Bet on Women	Jeanne Drake		
1931	Annabelle's Affairs	Annabelle Leigh	Considered a lost film	
1932	Paramount on Parade	Herself	Song duet removed from final cut Also appeared in the Spanish-language releases singing a different song	
1932	One Hour with You	Colette Bertier	Reprised role in French version	
1932	Love Me Tonight	Princess Jeanette		
1934	The Cat and the Fiddle	Shirley Sheridan		
1934	The Merry Widow	Sonia	Renamed The Lady Dances in television airings after the 1952 remake	
1935	La Veuve joyeuse	Missia	French version of The Merry Widow	
1935	Naughty Marietta	Princess Marietta de Namours de la Bonfain		
1936	Rose Marie	Marie de Flor	Retitled Indian Love Call for television airing after 1954 remake	
1936	San Francisco	Mary Blake		
1937	Maytime	Marcia Mornay		
1937	The Firefly	Nina Maria Azara		
1938	Hollywood Goes to Town	Herself		
1938	The Girl of the Golden West	Mary Robbins		
1938	Sweethearts	Gwen Marlowe		
1939	Broadway Serenade	Mary Hale		
1940	The Miracle of Sound	Herself		
1940	New Moon	Marianne de Beaumanoir		
1940	Bitter Sweet	Sarah Millick		
1941	Smilin' Through	Kathleen; Moonyean Clare	Dual roles	
1942	I Married an Angel	Anna / Brigitta		
1942	Cairo	Marcia Warren		
1944	Follow the Boys	Herself		
1948	Three Daring Daughters	Louise Rayton Morgan		
1949	The Sun Comes Up	Helen Lorfield Winter		

=== Box Office Ranking ===
- 1936 - 9th (US)
- 1937 - 13th (US), 7th (UK)
- 1938 - 14th (US), 2nd (UK)
- 1939 - 19th (US), 5th (UK)
- 1940 - 4th (UK)
- 1941 - 5th (UK)
- 1942 - 5th (UK)

== Television ==
- Jeanette MacDonald in Performance: The Voice of Firestone Season 2 Episode 11 Nov 13, 1950
- Jeanette MacDonald – "The Ed Sullivan Show" Episodes 5.17 and 4.47 (1951)
- Jeanette MacDonald in "Toast of the Town" Season 3 Episode 47. August 5, 1951
- Jeanette MacDonald on "Toast of the Town" Season 4 Episode 17. Top Stars of 1951. December 30, 1951
- Jeanette MacDonald on "Texaco Star Theater" Season 4 Episode 37. May 27, 1952
- Jeanette MacDonald – "This Is Your Life" Ralph Edwards Productions Nov.12, 1952
- Jeanette MacDonald- "What's My Line" Season 4 Episode 16. December 21, 1952
- Jeanette MacDonald- "The Name's the Same" December 30, 1952
- Jeanette MacDonald- "I've Got a Secret" September 2, 1953
- Jeanette MacDonald- "The Jackie Gleason Show" Guest Vocalist. 1953
- Jeanette MacDonald as Martha. Prima Donna – "Screen Director's Playhouse" Season 1 Episode 17 February 1, 1956
- Jeanette MacDonald- "The Lux Video Theatre Hollywood Musical Holiday Revue" Season 7 Episode 13 December 20, 1956
- Jeanette MacDonald- Playhouse 90 Charley's Aunt Season 1 Episode 26. March 28, 1957
- Jeanette MacDonald on "The Big Record". Season 1 Episode 2. September 25, 1957
- Jeanette MacDonald on "Person to Person" Season 6 Episode 6. October 31, 1958
- Jeanette MacDonald on "The Jack Parr Show". Season 3 Episode 51. December 1, 1959

== Selected stage work ==
Appearance		Title	Genre	Role	Notes	Ref.
First	Last	Title	Genre	Role	Notes	Ref.
February 19, 1909		Charity	Children's opera	Mother Hubbard	One performance	
1913		Al White's Children's Carnival	Talent show	MacDonald performed three songs and participated in other children's acts	One performance	
October 24, 1919	December 1919	Ned Wayburn's Demi-Tasse Revue	"Movie-palace" prologue	Indian girl	—	
February 2, 1920	August 1920	The Night Boat	Musical comedy	Appeared as a dancer and singer in an ensemble	Also understudied Lousie Goody and Stella Hoban	
August 1920	December 1920	Irene	Musical comedy	Eleanor Worth	Officially opened November 1919	
September 1921	April 1922	Tangerine	Musical comedy	Kate Allen	Replaced Edna Pierce; Understudy for Julia Sanderson	
October 1922	—N/a	A Fantastic Fricassee	Revue	Performed three songs	Officially opened September 11, 1922 and ran for 124 performances	
October 1, 1923	May 26, 1925	The Magic Ring	Musical comedy	Iris Bellamy	MacDonald followed the performances on the road tour after it closed in New York	
October 28, 1925	—N/a	Tip-Toes	Musical comedy	Sylvia Metcalf	194 performances	
October 4, 1926	Two weeks later	Bubbling Over	Musical comedy	Geraldine Gray	Had a one-week run	
October 3, 1927	—N/a	Yes, Yes, Yvette	Musical comedy	Yvette Ralston	Spin-off to No, No, Nanette	
November 14, 1927	Two weeks later	The Studio Girl	Musical romance	Trilby	Show debuted in October; MacDonald replaced Florence Misgen	
February 8, 1928	—N/a	Sunny Days	Musical comedy	Ginette Bertin	109 performances	
December 3, 1928	—N/a	Angela	Comedy, featuring musical numbers	Princess Alestine Victorine Angela	Based on A Royal Family by Captain Robert Marshall	
January 28, 1929	March 30, 1929	Boom-Boom	Musical comedy	Jean	72 performances	
May 8, 1943	July 10, 1945	Roméo et Juliette	Opera (five acts)	Juliette	Tour: May 8–24, 1943; Tour: November 9–11, 1944	
November 15, 1944	December 12, 1951	Faust	Opera (five acts)	Marguerite	Tour: July 15–25, 1945; Tour: October 27 – November 3, 1945	
January 25, 1951	June 2, 1951	The Guardsman	Comedy	Singer	MacDonald's original role was changed from Actress to Singer so that she could have a musical number	
July 19, 1954	July 17, 1955	Bitter Sweet	Operetta (Summer stock theatre)	Sarah Millick; Sari Linden; Marchioness of Shayne	Tour:July 27-August 2, 1944; Tour: August 9–14, 1954; Tour: August 31-September 12, 1954; Tour: July 4–17, 1955	
August 20, 1956	—N/a	The King and I	Musical (Summer stock production)	Anna Leonowens	—	
August 11, 1959	September 27, 1959	Bitter Sweet	Operetta (Summer stock)	—	—	
