= Romance of Celluloid =

The Romance of Celluloid
- Starring: Adrian; Jack Dawn; Cliff Edwards; Clark Gable; Gladys George; Virginia Grey; Don Loomis; Robert Montgomery; Maureen O'Sullivan; Jessie Ralph; Rosalind Russell; Herbert Stothart
- Narrated by: Frank Whitbeck
- Distributed by: Metro-Goldwyn-Mayer
- Release date: August 27, 1937
- Running time: 10 minutes
- Country: United States

we must have music directs here The Romance of Celluloid is a 1937 short black and white documentary film, narrated by Frank Whitbeck, which goes behind the scenes to look at the manufacture of film and the making of motion pictures. The film was the first of the studio's Romance of Celluloid series which also included:

- Another Romance of Celluloid (1938)
- From the Ends of the Earth: Another Romance of Celluloid (1939)
- Electrical Power: Another Romance of Celluloid (1939)
- A New Romance of Celluloid: The Miracle of Sound (1940)
- A New Romance of Celluloid: Hollywood; Style Center of the World (1940)
- A New Romance of Celluloid: You Can't Fool a Camera (1941)
- A New Romance of Celluloid: Personalities (1942)
- A New Romance of Celluloid: We Must Have Music (1942) (Note: We Must Have Music (1942) contains a fragment of a musical number deleted from the film Ziegfeld Girl (1941), sung by Judy Garland. The rest of the musical number is lost.)
- Twenty Years After: A New Romance of Celluloid (1944)

== Synopsis ==
The film starts with a brief look at cotton being picked on a plantation in the southern United States, before cutting to the Kodak plant in Rochester, New York where the raw cotton is processed into cellulose which is treated with silver and other materials to make film stock. Behind the scenes at the Metro-Goldwyn-Mayer Studios in Culver City, California, where sets are being constructed, we see make-up artist Jack Dawn demonstrating his Abraham Lincoln make-up, costume designer Adrian sketching a dress for Jeanette MacDonald in The Firefly (1937), composer Herbert Stothart conducting the music for Conquest (1937), Virginia Grey doing her first screen test with Clark Gable, and candid footage of Robert Montgomery, Cliff Edwards, Rosalind Russell, Gladys George, Jessie Ralph, Maureen O'Sullivan and studio trainer Don Loomis. The film concludes with a montage from trailers for coming MGM pictures featuring the studio's parade of stars.

== Production ==
The film was shot on location at the Metro-Goldwyn-Mayer Studios in Culver City, California and the Kodak plant in Rochester, New York.
