= Fred Phillips (make-up artist) =

- Born: Frederick Beauregard Phillips; April 26, 1908; Raleigh, North Carolina
- Died: March 21, 1993 (aged 84)
- Occupation: make-up artist

Frederick Beauregard Phillips (April 26, 1908 – March 21, 1993), also known as Fred Philipps, was a Hollywood make-up artist. After his early MGM Studios work under Jack Dawn and William J. Tuttle, he did a pioneering stint at the Star Trek TV series, and created the formula for Spock's ears. In 1980, Phillips was nominated for a Saturn Award for best makeup on the film Star Trek: The Motion Picture.

== Career ==
Early in his career, Phillips went uncredited as a make-up artist on a number of films including The Wizard of Oz (1939) and Around the World in Eighty Days (1956). His credited work included Blacula (1972) and One Flew Over the Cuckoo's Nest (1975).

On television, he worked as a makeup supervisor for the entire 1963–1965 run of The Outer Limits, as well as on other shows, such as The Adventures of Superboy.

The last film Phillips worked on was 1981's Under the Rainbow.

He was credited under a number of variations of his name, including Fred B. Phillips, Fred Phillips and Fred Philipps.

=== Star Trek ===
Because Spock's ears are some of the most visible and famous make-up appliances associated with Star Trek: The Original Series, many people believe that Phillips, as the designated make-up artist for the show, designed Spock's ears; however, this is not true.

There was a contract in place with an outside company to make the ears, but after several failed attempts, Fred Phillips called a former colleague of his, Charlie Shram (the then-head of make-up at Metro-Goldwyn-Mayer Studios (MGM)). As a favor to Phillips, Shram took a mold of Nimoy's ears and designed and manufactured the first usable set of Spock ears prior to the production of the first attempt at a pilot episode, "The Cage".

While working on Star Trek: The Original Series, Phillips would create new ears every few days in batches by baking them. Not every pair fit actor Leonard Nimoy successfully and so multiples were required. They were made out of latex, and were fragile, easily being damaged while being removed or during scenes. That mould and two pairs of ears were listed for sale at Christie's auction house in November 2000.

In addition to his work on the Vulcans, he also designed the original Klingons, Romulans and the majority of the other aliens in the series. He went on to work on Star Trek: The Motion Picture, and was responsible for shaving Persis Khambatta's head so that she could portray Ilia in the film. He was asked to return for Star Trek II: The Wrath of Khan, but due to his diminishing eyesight, he turned the offer down.

Prior to the adoption of digital media, Phillips was occasionally conflated with an eponymous New York City science fiction fan who helped to popularize the Society for Creative Anachronism and the works of H.P. Lovecraft.

== Awards ==
He was nominated for a Saturn Award for his work on Star Trek: The Motion Picture, along with fellow make-up artists Ve Neill and Janna Phillips (his daughter).

Phillips was awarded a lifetime achievement award for his makeup work in 1983 by the Society of Operating Cameramen.

== Selected filmography ==
- Naughty Marietta (1935) (make-up artist) (uncredited)
- Rose Marie (1936) (make-up artist) (uncredited)
- Mr. Moto's Last Warning (1939) (make-up artist) (uncredited)
- The Wizard of Oz (1939) (make-up artist) (uncredited)
- The Talk of the Town (1942) (make-up artist) (uncredited)
- The Velvet Touch (1948) (makeup supervisor) (as Fred Phillips)
- Stampede (1949) (make-up artist) (as Fred Phillips)
- Love Happy (1949) (make-up artist) (as Fred Phillips)
- Tell It to the Judge (1949) (make-up artist) (as Fred Phillips)
- A Woman of Distinction (1950) (make-up artist) (uncredited)
- The Fighting Stallion (1950) (make-up artist) (as Fred Phillips)
- Bunco Squad (1950) (make-up artist) (as Fred Phillips)
- Dallas (1950) (make-up artist) (uncredited)
- Around the World in Eighty Days (1956) (make-up artist) (uncredited)
- House of Usher (1960) (make-up artist) (as Fred Phillips)
- Blacula (1972) (make-up artist)
- Gone with the West (1975) (makeup supervisor) (as Fred Phillips)
- One Flew Over the Cuckoo's Nest (1975) (make-up artist) (as Fred Phillips)
- Star Trek: The Motion Picture (1979) (make-up artist)
- Under the Rainbow (1981) (special makeup effects)

== TV shows ==
- The Adventures of Superboy (1961) (TV) (make-up artist)
- Bat Masterson (make-up artist) (14 episodes, 1961)
- The Outer Limits (makeup supervisor) (49 episodes, 1963–1965)
- Star Trek (make-up artist) (78 episodes, 1966–1969)
- James Dean (1976) (TV) (make-up artist) (as Fred Phillips)
- Pleasure Palace (1980) (TV) (make-up artist) (as Fred Phillips)
- Man from Atlantis (1977) (TV) (make-up artist)
