= The Miracle of Sound =

- Film title card
- Directed by: Douglas Shearer
- Starring: Douglas Shearer; Jeanette MacDonald; Nelson Eddy; Greer Garson; W.S. Van Dyke
- Narrated by: Frank Whitbeck
- Cinematography: Lester White
- Edited by: Jack Ruggiero
- Music by: Daniele Amfitheatrof
- Distributed by: MGM
- Release date: 1940
- Running time: 11 minutes
- Country: United States

A New Romance of Celluloid: The Miracle of Sound is a 1940 short documentary film, presented and directed by MGM sound engineer Douglas Shearer and narrated by Frank Whitbeck, which goes behind the scenes to look at how the sound portion of a talking picture is created. The film, which was produced as part of the studio's Romance of Celluloid series, is available as a bonus on the Warner DVD of The Shop Around the Corner.

== Synopsis ==
The film starts with a brief introduction to the work of Thomas A. Edison and a clip from William K.L. Dickson's The Dickson Experimental Sound Film (c. 1894). Douglas Shearer then presents a behind the scenes look at the filming of W.S. Van Dyke's Bitter Sweet (1940) featuring Jeanette MacDonald and Nelson Eddy to explain how the sound is recorded. A scene from King Vidor's Comrade X (1940) featuring Clark Gable and Hedy Lamarr is used to demonstrate the final result. The film concludes with a montage from trailers for coming MGM pictures and a Technicolor screen test of Greer Garson for Mervyn LeRoy's Blossoms in the Dust (1941).

== Production ==
The film was shot on location at the Metro-Goldwyn-Mayer Studios in Culver City, California.
