= Jeff Dawn =

American makeup artist

- Born: United States
- Occupation: Makeup artist
- Years active: 1982-present
- Children: Patrick Dawn (Born 1989)
- Parent: Robert Dawn
- Family: Jack Dawn (grandfather)

Jeff Dawn is an American makeup artist who is known for working with Arnold Schwarzenegger. He has done makeup on 19 of Schwarzenegger's films. He won an Academy Award in the category of Best Makeup during the 64th Academy Awards for his work on Terminator 2: Judgment Day. He shared his win with Stan Winston.

He has worked on over 50 movies and television shows. As of 2017, Dawn was the head of the makeup department for the Hawaii Five-0.

== Personal life and family ==
He comes from a family of makeup artists-his grandfather Jack Dawn worked on The Wizard of Oz. His father Robert Dawn and uncle Wes Dawn were also makeup artists. His son Patrick Dawn is a makeup artist as well.
