= Edna Gladney =

American children's rights activist (1886–1961)

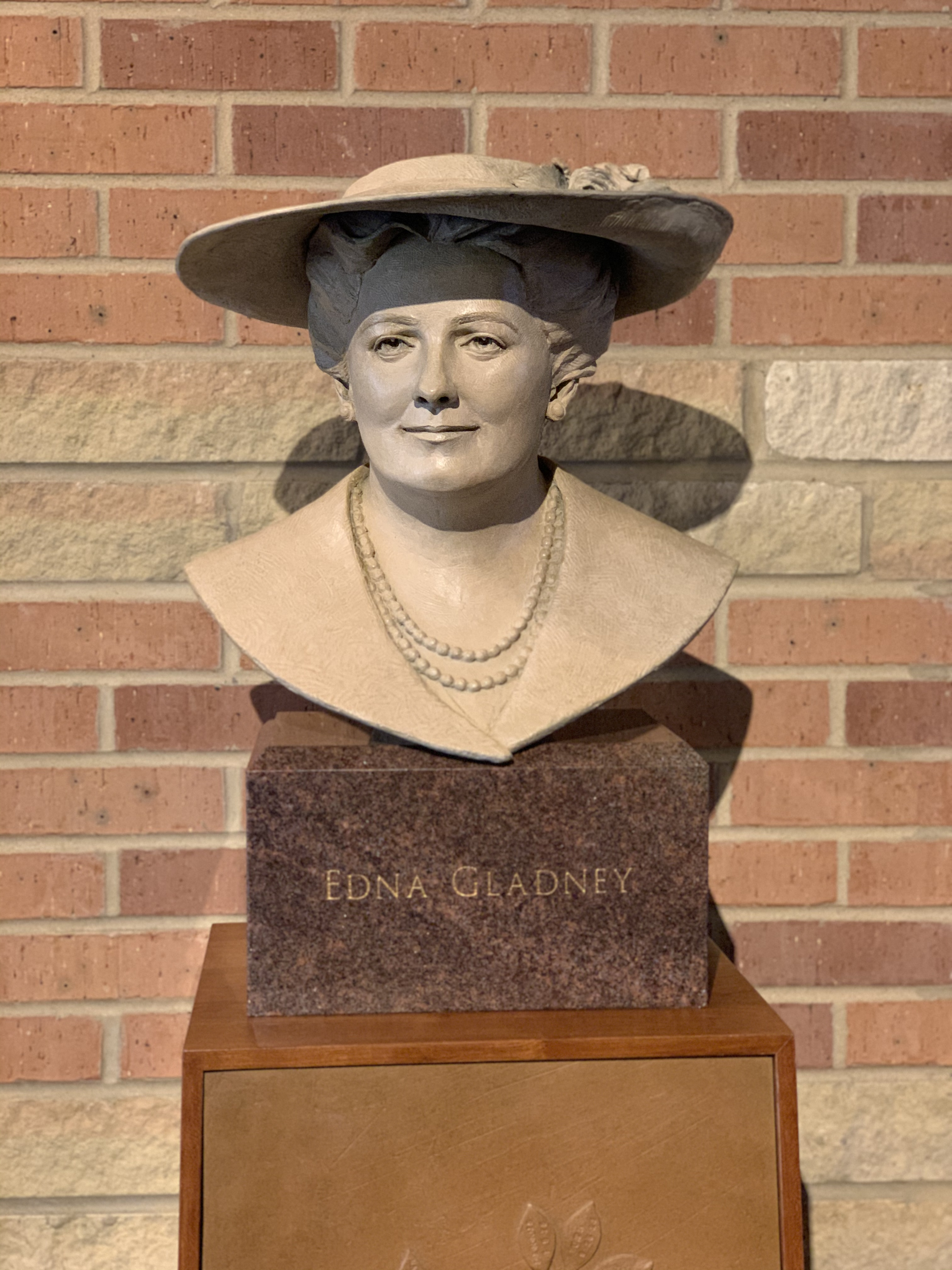
- Bust of Edna Gladney
- Born: Edna Browning Jones; January 22, 1886; Milwaukee, Wisconsin, US
- Died: October 2, 1961 (aged 75); Fort Worth, Tarrant County, Texas, US
- Burial place: Shannon Rose Hill Memorial Park; 32.729536°N 97.201625°W
- Other names: Edna Browning Kahly Gladney
- Occupations: Child welfare services; Social worker
- Years active: 1910–1959
- Known for: ☆ Sherman Civic League Hygiene Examiner (1910); ☆ Grayson County Poor Farm Reformation (1917); ☆ Texas Children’s Home and Aid Society (1924)
- Notable work: Advocacy of Texas adoption; Texas Children’s Home Superintendent of Ft. Worth, Texas; Texas 44th legislature of 1935 passing H.B. No. 732 requiring illegitimate omitted on birth certificates; Transition of Orphan Train movement, street urchins, and waifs

Edna Browning Kahly Gladney (January 22, 1886 – October 2, 1961) was an early campaigner for children's rights and better living conditions for disadvantaged children.

Her life story was told in the 1941 film Blossoms in the Dust, in which she was portrayed by Greer Garson, who was nominated for the Academy Award for Best Actress for her performance as Gladney.

== Early life ==
Edna Browning Jones was born on January 22, 1886 in Milwaukee, Wisconsin to Minnie Nell Jones, who was 17 and unmarried. Her natural father was never revealed. Her mother later married Maurice Kahly, and the couple had a daughter named Dorothy together. Edna worked as a clerk at Mutual Life Insurance to support her mother and sister, but was sent to live with her aunt and uncle, an executive at Texas & Pacific Coal and Thurber Brick Company in Fort Worth, Texas, in 1904. Edna's aunt was involved in Fort Worth society and women's clubs, and Edna quickly moved into these social circles as well.

Though expecting to only stay in Fort Worth for a few months, Edna stayed longer, and in 1906, she met Sam Gladney, a Gainesville, Texas native who worked at Medlin Mills. After a summer of courtship, Edna left her Wisconsin fiancé two days short of their planned wedding and eloped with Sam. The Gladneys lived in Wolfe City, Texas from 1909 to 1913, then moved to Sherman, Texas where Sam had bought his own flour mill. In 1910, Edna joined the Sherman Civic League and started inspecting local meat markets and public restrooms for cleanliness.

== Grayson County Poor Farm ==
On one of these Grayson County, Texas inspections, Gladney came across the Grayson County Poor Farm, which was little more than a dumping ground for the feeble-minded, handicapped, indigent, mentally ill, and unwanted. Appalled at the Poor Farm's conditions, especially for children, she enlisted the other Civic League members in a campaign for improvements beginning in 1917. The Civic League had a meeting with the Grayson County Commissioners Court, the local governing body and owners of the Poor Farm, where they declared it everyone's responsibility to care for the children at the farm. Impatient for action, the women of the civic league, led by Gladney, went to the farm and personally cleaned it. Gladney then arranged the transfer of the children to the Texas Children's Home and Aid Society in Fort Worth run by Reverend I.Z.T. Morris.

== Texas Children's Home and Aid Society ==
By 1910, Gladney had joined the board of directors for the Texas Children's Home and Aid Society. She studied settlement work and child welfare, and established a free day nursery in Sherman to provide childcare for working mothers who had moved into industrial jobs during World War I. Thirty-five women enrolled their children on opening day of the Sherman Day Nursery and Kindergarten for Working Mothers. The free day nursery was financed by Gladney and donations to collection boxes that she placed in local businesses. The day nursery was among the early daycare facilities in Texas and was operated by the City of Sherman until 2008.

While living in Sherman, Gladney audited classes at the North Texas Female College. In 1921, the Gladneys returned to Fort Worth, where Edna attended classes at Texas Christian University. The Gladneys commissioned Edna's cousin, the renowned American architect Frank Lloyd Wright, to design a house in Fort Worth's Forest Park neighborhood, but the plans were never realized.

Gladney began to devote more and more of her time to the Texas Children's Home and Aid Society, and by 1927, she had been named superintendent, a position she held until 1961. In 1929, Fort Worth publisher and philanthropist Amon G. Carter helped secure the first home for the Texas Children's Home and Aid Society. The large home, located on El Paso Street, was owned by the head of Texas Power and Light; Edna's mother oversaw daily operations of the facility until her death in 1938.

After her husband died on Valentine's Day 1935, Gladney continued to make the welfare of unwanted children the center of her life, personally placing children with adoptive families. She continued the work of Reverend Morris by placing abandoned children with adoptive families. She also expanded the society's activities to focus on the care of unmarried mothers and an adoption service for their babies. She focused her efforts on hard-to-place children during the Depression.

In 1950, the Texas Children's Home and Aid Society bought the West Texas Maternity Hospital, which was renamed the Edna Gladney Home (now the Gladney Center for Adoption). The purchase of the hospital expanded services to birth mothers and provided prenatal care. This new agency also operated a baby home where infants received care until their adoptions.

== Legislation ==
Gladney lobbied the Texas 44th legislature of 1935 to have the word "illegitimate" kept off birth certificates of adopted and abandoned children. She succeeded in 1936, making Texas the first state in the southwest to legally remove the stigma of illegitimacy. In 1939, Gladney successfully campaigned for a change in the Texas law that sealed the original birth certificates of adopted children and that made a second copy of the birth certificate, listing only the child's adoptive name and parents; the sealed original birth certificate could be opened only by court order. In 1951, Gladney helped to get a bill passed that gave adopted children the same inheritance rights as biological children and recognized that they should be legally adopted rather than placed in "long-term guardianship."

== Blossoms in the Dust ==
In 1939, Ralph Wheelwright, an MGM publicist who had adopted a child from the Texas Children's Home, developed a story based on Gladney's work, which became the film Blossoms in the Dust. The 1941 film starred Greer Garson and Walter Pidgeon as Edna and Sam Gladney, and was the first of eight films the actors made together. The film's sets, noted for their accuracy, were based on detailed photographs shot on location in Sherman, Fort Worth, and Austin, Texas. All of Gladney's proceeds from the film went back into funding the children's home.

== Death and legacy ==
Ill health forced Gladney into semi-retirement in 1960, but she remained active as an adviser until her death on October 2, 1961, from complications of diabetes. Gladney is buried at Rose Hill Cemetery in East Fort Worth. Gladney placed over 10,000 babies with adoptive parents during her career and totally revolutionized adoption practices. She helped to grant adoptive children the same rights as "natural" children and gave orphaned children and many birth mothers a place to stay and a hospital where they could receive treatment. Gladney helped develop modern day adoption practices and removed the stigma of "illegitimacy" from birth records and from society. Gladney treated all of "her" children as if they were her own and continued correspondence with adopted children long after they had left her care.

In 2019, the Gladney Center was excited to unveil a very special bronze bust of Mrs. Gladney by artist Linda Stinson. Stinson has art pieces in museums and hall-of-fame galleries throughout the United States. After collecting many photos and reading Edna's life story, Linda began the long creative process of sculpting Edna in the summer of 2018. The piece stands 5’3” tall, the same height of Edna Gladney. Although a hat was not in the original plan, Linda said Edna kept telling her “I need a hat.” Linda “listened” and the sculpture is wearing one of Edna's signature hats. The pedestal contains a bronze bas-relief panel with 66 leaves, each leaf represents 150 babies that were adopted during Edna's time of service at the Gladney Center. Each of the leaves has a birth date and baby's name etched in it.

== See also ==
- Children's Aid Society
- Legitimacy (family law)
