= Joint Council on International Children's Services =

Former child advocacy organization

- Joint Council on International Children's Services logo
- Formation: 1975
- Headquarters: Alexandria, VA
- Executive Director: Jennifer Mellon
- Website: http://www.jointcouncil.org/

Joint Council on International Children's Services, founded in 1976, was a nonprofit child advocacy organization based in Alexandria, Virginia. The organization "work[ed] to end the suffering of children who live every day without the protection and love of a strong permanent and safe family. Our 142 Partners in 52 countries do the same."

== Advocacy ==
Joint Council advocated for legislation, funding, and aggressive prosecution of corrupt practices in adoption. They promoted domestic adoption around the world, including in China, Africa, and Eastern Europe, while also advocating against the closure of international adoption programs.

In April 2010, after an American mother put her unwanted seven-year-old Russian-adopted son on a plane alone to Russia, Joint Council organized a petition to Barack Obama and Dmitry Medvedev with over 11,000 signatures discouraging Russia from freezing its international adoption program.

In 2014 the Council "partnered with 12 non-profits and India’s Central Authority on Child Welfare to assess India’s new child protection and adoption laws." That same year, work with the Indian government, Operation Smile and other partners "allow[ed] for the first time ever, 16,000 children in institutions to be eligible for cleft pallet surgeries if needed."

The Joint Council was the head of the (U.S.) Adoption Tax Credit Working Group in at least 2015. The Council was also co-founder and, together with Save the Children, co-chair of the Children in Adversity Policy Partnership (CAPP), which "brings together over 40 organizations to strengthen and implement the US Government Action Plan for Children in Adversity (APCA, a first-ever comprehensive approach to U.S. foreign assistance to children)." First created in 2012, the APCA is “a demonstration of the U.S. Government’s commitment to greater coordinated, comprehensive and effective assistance to prevent and respond to the needs of especially vulnerable children. More than 30 offices across the U.S. Government continue to support programs and policies relevant to the APCA objectives globally.”

Media outlets often featured comments from former Joint Council CEO, Tom DiFilipo, on articles related to international adoption. Statements from Joint Council have appeared in the Associated Press, USA Today, the New York Times and the Wall Street Journal, among others.

== Education and Research ==
The Council's Emerging Leadership Program "identifie[d], cultivate[d], educate[d] and support[ed] professionals and government officials who are positioned to make ‘a family for every child’ a priority for society… and a reality for all children." In 2015 alone, the Council "provided on-site training and distance learning to over 600 unique professionals both in the U.S. and abroad, we increased U.S. funding for children and family services, and we cultivated 18 emerging leaders through our Foreign Visitors Training & Exchange Program and Intern Development Programs."

The Council also offered four-month rotating internships for two qualified college and graduate school students. "Each internship include[d] a substantive research or policy project, ongoing education on public policy and non-profit management, a staff mentor, participation in two or more external policy workshops, career networking opportunities, post-program support and a competitive stipend."

== Partnerships ==
Joint Council's partner organizations included over 160 child welfare organizations, domestic and international adoption agencies, as well as orphan care organizations and other groups that provided services related to child welfare, orphan care or adoption.

According to its website, "collectively, Joint Council and its partners provide[d] over $760 million in services to 2.1 million children and families in 52 countries. All partners of our coalition adhere to the Joint Council Standards of Practice with a goal of providing ethical services in the best interest of children and families." Such services and programs included:

- Nutrition;
- Medicine;
- Advocacy;
- Family Preservation;
- Domestic Foster Care and Adoption;
- Intercountry Adoption (incoming and outgoing);
- Kinship Care;
- Family Support;
- Orphan Care;
- Women's Empowerment.

One of the Council's partners was Miriam's Promise, which "stands in the gap, building bridges through crisis pregnancy counseling and child placement services. They offer assistance for domestic, international and independent adoption, as well as post-placement services. Their promise is to ensure the well-being of the child by nurturing individuals and families." The SPOON Foundation, "recognizing the urgency of malnutrition for children impacted by disabilities and/or institutionalized care [and] equipping governments and citizen organizations to protect these children from the...consequences of nutritional deficiencies and improper feeding," was another. Others included the Barker Foundation, Heart of the Matter Seminars, and Adoptions of Indiana.

== Challenges and Demise ==
Notes from a December 2009 Joint Council stakeholders meeting were leaked online. In them, the council listed two core challenges to their organization, its financial viability and the efficacy of its advocacy efforts and public policy initiatives.

=== Financial Issues ===
Although the council focused on issues like a cause-based organization, it was structured like an association or trade organization, which get funding from "dues, fees for service, conferences, books, and magazines. For 29 of the past 33 years, Joint Council was funded from Dues and Fees for Service." For the remaining four years, 30% of the council's income came from dues. The Council's budget had reduced from a high of $1.1 million in 2007 to $450,000 in 2010. The notes list only two options for financial sustainability, moving to a "pre-1997 model whereby Joint Council operates with a 100% volunteer staff" or cutting back on initiatives and limiting their programming to conferences and listservs. The Joint Council was preparing a Stakeholders Initiative to generate funds, which involved applying for grants, giving seats on the board to donors, and public appeals.

=== Public Image ===
In the same notes, the Joint Council notes that it "is seen by many public policy makers, the press, NGOs and the public as:

- Serving the self-interest of Adoption Service Providers;
- Not having Adoption Service Providers of the highest quality, ethics or standards;
- Having an inherent conflict of interest;
- Protecting individual Adoption Service Providers;
- A trade organization, rather than an objective advocate".

The Council names some of these NGOs as "the highly respected Half the Sky Foundation...Global Action for Children...USAID....[and] the Orphans and Vulnerable Children Working Group, this despite the fact that some were founded by adoptive families and as a direct result of IA (international adoption)." It argued that in fact "trade Associations can be effective advocates for a particular group of for-profit and/or non-for-profits."

The Council acknowledged that "to increase the efficacy of public policy initiatives, changes must be made which will result in increased credibility," such as "elimination of conflicts of interest such as that constituted in the current Board structure by limiting the number of seats filled by employees of Adoption Service Providers" and "increasing the Membership criteria for voting Member Organizations."

=== Demise ===
The Joint Council ceased operations June 30, 2015. Board chair Brian Franklin in the email announcement said "this was a difficult and painful decision to make, and we would like you to know that the Board acted reluctantly. As an organization, we have been subject to the same trends that have impacted many of our partners over the last decade. While we have been on the brink before, each time we were able to recover, but with diminished capacity. At this point in time, we are simply out of money and realize that we no longer have the prospect of continuing as a viable organization."

== See also ==
- International adoption
- US Department of State Office of Children's Issues
- Congressional Coalition on Adoption Institute
