= Remember? (1939 film) =

1939 film by Norman Z. McLeod

- Theatrical poster
- Directed by: Norman Z. McLeod
- Written by: Corey Ford; Norman Z. McLeod
- Produced by: Milton Bren
- Starring: Robert Taylor; Greer Garson; Lew Ayres
- Cinematography: George J. Folsey, A.S.C.
- Edited by: Harold F. Kress
- Music by: Edward Ward
- Production company: Metro-Goldwyn-Mayer
- Release date: December 19, 1939
- Running time: 83 minutes
- Country: United Kingdom
- Language: English
- Budget: $611,000
- Box office: $889,000

Remember? is an American romantic comedy released on December 19, 1939, directed by Norman Z. McLeod and starring Robert Taylor, Greer Garson and Lew Ayres. It was rushed into production by MGM studio chief Louis B. Mayer to capitalize on the attention and publicity generated by Greer Garson in her first film appearance, Goodbye Mr. Chips, released seven months earlier.

== Plot ==
Following an establishing shot of the New York City skyline, an elevator in a busy office building opens and happy-go-lucky Sky Ames (Lew Ayres) steps out. In a joyful mood, singing to himself, he takes out a ring, puts it on third finger of his left hand and goes to the door marked "Eaton, Eiton, Piper & Holland Advertising Agency". Inside, Miss Wilson (Sara Haden), secretary to his best friend, Jeff Holland (Robert Taylor) tells him that Jeff is in a meeting. Showing her the ring, Sky explains that during the first vacation he took without Jeff, he met "the most wonderful girl in the world".

In Jeff's office, Mr. McIntyre (George Barbier) the ill-tempered health-tonic tycoon is complaining to Jeff and his elderly deaf partner, Mr. Piper (Richard Carle) that after spending a million dollars per year on advertising, he has the right to anticipate better results and, "if you can't put over this health tonic, I'll take the account to another advertising firm that can". He leaves, telling Jeff that he expects to see him at the 3 o'clock board meeting, angrily adding "sharp". Spotting Sky, Jeff asks about his trip to Nassau and Sky invites him for lunch at the Colony, a luxury restaurant renowned for its elite patronage.

Upon entering the Colony, while Sky is completing his hat check, Jeff spots a beautiful woman (Greer Garson) and when Sky asks, "what is it?", tells him, "just about the nicest thing I ever saw in my life, that's all". Sky then introduces the woman, Linda Bronson, to Jeff and asks, "do you like her well enough to marry her?" and Jeff answers, "Uh-huh, will you marry me?". Sky explains that he meant himself and Jeff says, "well, I'm sorry, old man, but I'm gonna marry her, too". Leaving Sky behind, Jeff leads Linda to a table and when she informs him that her wedding to Sky is "next week", offers to marry her "tomorrow" and tells Sky, "you're going to be our best man". When Linda says to Sky, "your friend here works pretty fast", Sky answers, "well, he could work a lot faster if he tried. For instance, he could elope with you and not tell me anything about it, you know, just send me back a postcard".

Meanwhile, back at the office, Piper is worried that Jeff hasn't returned for the meeting with McIntyre. He tells Miss Wilson to call the restaurant, while, at the table, Sky explains his ideas about time and memory, "if you really want to forget a thing, you musn't try to forget it", and Jeff reacts with, "there he goes again, that same old theory". Jeff persists with Linda in front of Sky and, when a telephone is brought to the table, Jeff pretends that Miss Wilson's call is really in regards to Sky, because his office has been looking for him "all over town". When Linda tries to leave along with Sky, however, since she has a hairdresser's appointment, Jeff holds her by the arm and says that he will take care of the check and look after Linda. As he departs, Sky mentions that he will see Linda that evening at her house and says, "funny they should have called me at your office".

Back at Jeff's office, Piper is apologizing on the phone to McIntyre for Jeff's absence at the meeting, while McIntyre, with his assistant Sky standing next to him, is becoming increasingly angry and asks Sky, "what did you do with him?". Sky replies, "well, he was all right when I left him at the Colony — he was with my girl". At the Colony, Jeff and Linda are still sitting, while the other tables are now empty, the headwaiter, Marcel (Armand Kaliz) answers the phone and, as Jeff waves his arms, says, "he's not here".

As evening arrives at the mansion of Linda's parents, the fashionably dressed guests are awaiting Linda who is late. The exasperated father (Reginald Owen) asks Linda's mother (Billie Burke), "how on earth does she expect us to know somebody we've never even met?" and she responds, "Oh, don't be silly, dear — I never knew you before I met you, did I?" The doorbell rings and the butler opens the door to Sky. Mrs. Bronson greets him and says, "come meet your father-in-law, now, he's my husband, you know, but I call him George". As Sky is introduced to the guests and Mr. Bronson, the doorbell again rings and Linda arrives with Jeff, explaining that she lost all track of time. While she goes up to change, Jeff is introduced to Mrs. Bronson's sister, Mrs. Carruthers (Laura Hope Crews) and is subsequently discomfited by all the attention and the talk about horses and saddles, with Sky doing his best to put him ill at ease and expose him as someone out of his element.

The next day, at the stables, everyone is wearing riding clothes for the fox hunt. Jeff, who is wearing Mr. Bronson's outfit, manages to break the top hat and then fall into the mud hole during a jump. As Linda offers her hand to pull him out, he manages to drag her into the big mud puddle. Walking from the puddle, they go into a barn and start taking off their wet clothes and then kiss, as the hunting party, with the disapproving Mr. Bronson and Sky in the lead, arrives. Mrs. Bronson exclaims, "tally tally ho, tally ho".

Later, Linda and Sky are playing golf and she says that from now on Jeff will be out of her mind and she'll never see him again. Sky advises her to do the opposite — make a date with Jeff and see him as often as she can, "that's the only way you can ever really put him out of your mind". She quickly agrees, but says that it would be only to say goodbye.

With the Perisphere and other structures of the 1939 World's Fair in the background, Jeff and Linda are walking amidst the crowds at the fairgrounds. They sit on the bench of miniature transportation train and try to say goodbye, but start reminiscing about the amusing events in which they have participated and decide to elope. As they kiss, the minitrain stops in front of the Niagara Falls Building and a member of the crowd observing them shouts out, "hey, aren't you folks going to see Niagara Falls?" and Jeff replies, "I'll say we are".

The next day, Linda arrives at Jeff's office, but he is too busy to remember. Disappointed, she leaves, but Jeff runs after her and, together, they rush into a cab. During the ride, they make plans for the future, but, holding the documentation for McIntyre's campaign with him, he stops the cab in front of McIntyre's building and rushes inside, promising to be right back, but McIntyre insists that he stay. Sky, who is in charge of McIntyre's research laboratory, comes in and McIntyre wants him to show Jeff around the facility and explain the chemical experiments which he is conducting. Dr. Schmidt (Sig Rumann), a German-accented scientist in the laboratory explains that they have invented a forgetfulness drug which makes the patient lose the memory of being sick or the shock of an accident or even the accident itself. By the time Jeff comes out, Linda has gotten tired of waiting and left the cab to return home in the suburb of White Plains. Jeff tells the cabdriver (unbilled Syd Saylor) to drive to White Plains, but as he catches up with Linda's cab, the chase attracts the attention of a motorcycle cop (Paul Hurst) who stops them. Jeff and Linda tell him that they are eloping so he leads them to the home of Judge Milliken (Henry Travers) who knows Linda's family and performs the ceremony. Outside, the motorcycle cop tears up the ticket and says, "suckers".

As Jeff and Linda unpack in their half-renovated house, their butler (Halliwell Hobbes) informs them that Sky, whom Linda called, is downstairs. Sky is disheartened and offers low-key congratulations, but Linda tries to cheer him up, saying that the three of them are friends for life. She asks Jeff and Sky how long they have known each other and when they say twenty-one years, she tells Jeff, "let's adopt Sky". They both kiss her and she says, "just one happy triangle".

Planning his honeymoon boat trip, Jeff is once again delayed by McIntyre, while at Linda's family home, her parents are planning a surprise party. Waiting for Jeff, Sky and Linda have been killing time playing backgammon. Eventually, Jeff arrives and rushes with Linda and Sky to White Plains where the guests, including Judge Milliken, have been drinking and waiting so they can jump out and shout "surprise". Coming into the room where the guests are hiding, Jeff tells Linda that he hates to come here and that he can't have a good time because "I have to look at that sour puss of your old man's all evening", adding that "I think he's a stuffed shirt and an old crab and a bore" and expanding about "that crowd of gibbering idiots he always has around him, like your half-wit aunt Letty, yap, yap, yap, yap, yap, yap". Going further, he mentions "that potato-faced judge who married us, you know, Milliken". Just then, Mrs. Bronson rings the bell for all the hidden guests to come out and their faces are dismayed and angry, especially that of Mr. Bronson.

During the dinner, Mr. Bronson interrupts himself on any topic that Jeff criticized, especially horses, while Jeff gets a call from Piper that he needs to see McIntyre before the honeymoon trip or the account will be lost. Asking Sky to cover for him and take Linda to the pier, Jeff rushes off.

As Sky, Linda and Linda's family watch from the pier, the ship departs and Jeff still has not arrived. Linda tells Sky that she's through waiting and, as Jeff finally gets to the pier, she walks away without a word.

In judge's chambers, Linda and Jeff have "interlocutory decree granted — final decree to become effective at the end of three months".

In the laboratory, Sky hears Dr. Schmidt pronounce that the forgetfulness drug is ready for testing, and returns to his office to find Jeff sleeping on his couch. Jeff says that he can't get Linda out of his mind and is unable to concentrate on anything else. At that point, Dr. Schmidt comes in and gives the vial of the forgetfulness drug to Sky who has an idea. He invites Jeff as his guest to a boxing match and as they arrive at Jeff's house, they run into Linda who explains that "I got my 'junk'". She tells Sky that couldn't see boxing because she "couldn't seem to rest last night". Sky offers "a little pick-up" for everybody and puts the drug into Jeff's and Linda's drink.

The next morning, Piper has an anxiety attack when Jeff turns the office upside down, because he's completely forgotten everything that has happened in the last six months, including all the ad campaigns and work orders that he himself had ordered. He now feels happy and energetic and also surprised that Sky returned from Nassau so soon. Sky takes him to lunch at the Colony where he spots Linda sitting exactly as she was when he first saw her. They go through the same motions and say the same things with Linda remembering that she and Sky were on the boat from Nassau the day before. Sky leaves to go back to his office and Linda takes Jeff home to introduce him to her mother who is astonished to see them back together and happy. Mr. Burton, however, walks in and says, "young man, how dare you set foot in this house?". Jeff leaves hastily, but he and Linda decide to have a date for that evening.

As Jeff is dressing for dinner and awaiting Linda, Sky arrives and tries to talk to him, but just then, Linda arrives. She compliments Jeff on his home and tells him that it is exactly the type of decor that she would have arranged herself. As Jeff shows her around the house, the butler gives her a pair of silk pajamas and tells her, "I'm sorry madam, I'm afraid you'll have to wear these for tonight". Offended, she tells Jeff that she'll be leaving. The butler returns with slippers, calling her "Mrs. Holland". She no longer feels offended and Jeff asks her if she believes in love at first sight and she says, "at lunch today". Jeff tells her, "let's get married" and they kiss. He says, "tonight" and suggests they sneak out the back to avoid Sky.

As they speed along, they are pulled over by the same motorcycle cop who stopped them on their first wedding day. Saying "sixty-five miles an hour", he looks at them, recognizing them as the same couple and again escorts them to Judge Milliken's house. The surprised judge tells them, "You don't have to get married — the ceremony isn't necessary — why, I mean, all you have to do is to start living together". Linda responds, "well, I thought I was fairly modern" and Jeff adds, "it's the last thing I expect to hear from a man in your position", with the cop interjecting, "either they get married or go to jail", so the judge invites them in, with the cop adding, "and I'll be the witness".

Later that evening, as Sky is asleep on the couch, Jeff carries Linda over the threshold of their new/former home. They explain to Sky that they are sorry, but they got married, with Linda adding, "it just seemed to happen — I guess it had to happen". Just then the doorbell rings and Mr. McIntyre brusquely walks in, congratulating Jeff on his new promotional campaign which is "the greatest stroke of advertising genius I've ever come across". He tells Jeff that a new contract will be waiting upon his return from the honeymoon. Sky offers a toast and Jeff and Linda invite him along on their honeymoon, "we'd have a lot of fun, the three of us". Sky declines, "two's a honeymoon". He correctly guesses that they plan to honeymoon in Niagara Falls and adds, "once I hoped to go there on a honeymoon myself". Linda then announces that she's going to have a baby. Jeff and Sky react with consternated expressions and then Sky takes the vial of forgetfulness fluid from his pocket, pours it all into his own glass, drinks it and stares directly into the camera for the fadeout.

== Cast ==
- Robert Taylor – Jeff Holland
- Greer Garson – Linda Bronson
- Lew Ayres – Sky Ames
- Billie Burke – Mrs. Bronson
- Reginald Owen – Mr. Bronson
- George Barbier – Mr. McIntyre
- Henry Travers – Judge Milliken
- Richard Carle – Mr. Piper
- Laura Hope Crews – Mrs. Carruthers
- Sara Haden – Miss Wilson
- Sig Rumann – Dr. Schmidt
- Halliwell Hobbes – Butler Williams
- Paul Hurst – Policeman
- Armand Kaliz – Marcel

== Evaluation in film guides ==
Leonard Maltin's Movie Guide gives Remember? 2 stars (out of 4) calling it a "blah comedy", concluding "nice try, but no cigar", with Steven H. Scheuer's Movies on TV arriving at the same 2 stars (out of 4) evaluation, describing it as a "silly little comedy" involving "some nonsensical experiment".

Assigning it 1 star (out of 5), The Motion Picture Guide states that "Garson's U.S. debut was not an auspicious one", describing the film as a "weak attempt at a romantic comedy". Further indicating that "no star can triumph over a clunky script and that the play is the thing", the review concludes, "it's a bore to watch, despite a few amusing moments and some crackling dialogue. Silly stuff made better than it seems by lighthearted acting from the principals and solid secondary work from the supporting cast. REMEMBER? is a picture that is easily forgotten."

== Newspaper advertisement ==
Remember Mrs. Chips? Who could forget her? When Greer Garson said "Hello America" in Goodbye Mr. Chips she became the screen's loveliest new star sensation! She is wonderful! And ---- Remember That Yank from Oxford? It was Bob Taylor's most delightful romantic adventure... until he fell for ex-Mrs. Chips! Remember Young Dr. Kildare? Lew Ayres has proven himself one of the screen's most capable romantic actors! ... You'll Never Forget All Three Together... in this gay glorious love story REMEMBER? Robert Taylor Greer Garson Lew Ayres NOTE! As one friend to another — Please do not divulge the ending to your friends... tell them to see it from the beginning!

== Box office ==
According to MGM records the film earned $555,000 in the US and Canada and $334,000 elsewhere resulting in a small loss of $32,000 despite its low costs.
