= Ziegfeld Girl (film) =

1941 film by Robert Zigler Leonard, Busby Berkeley

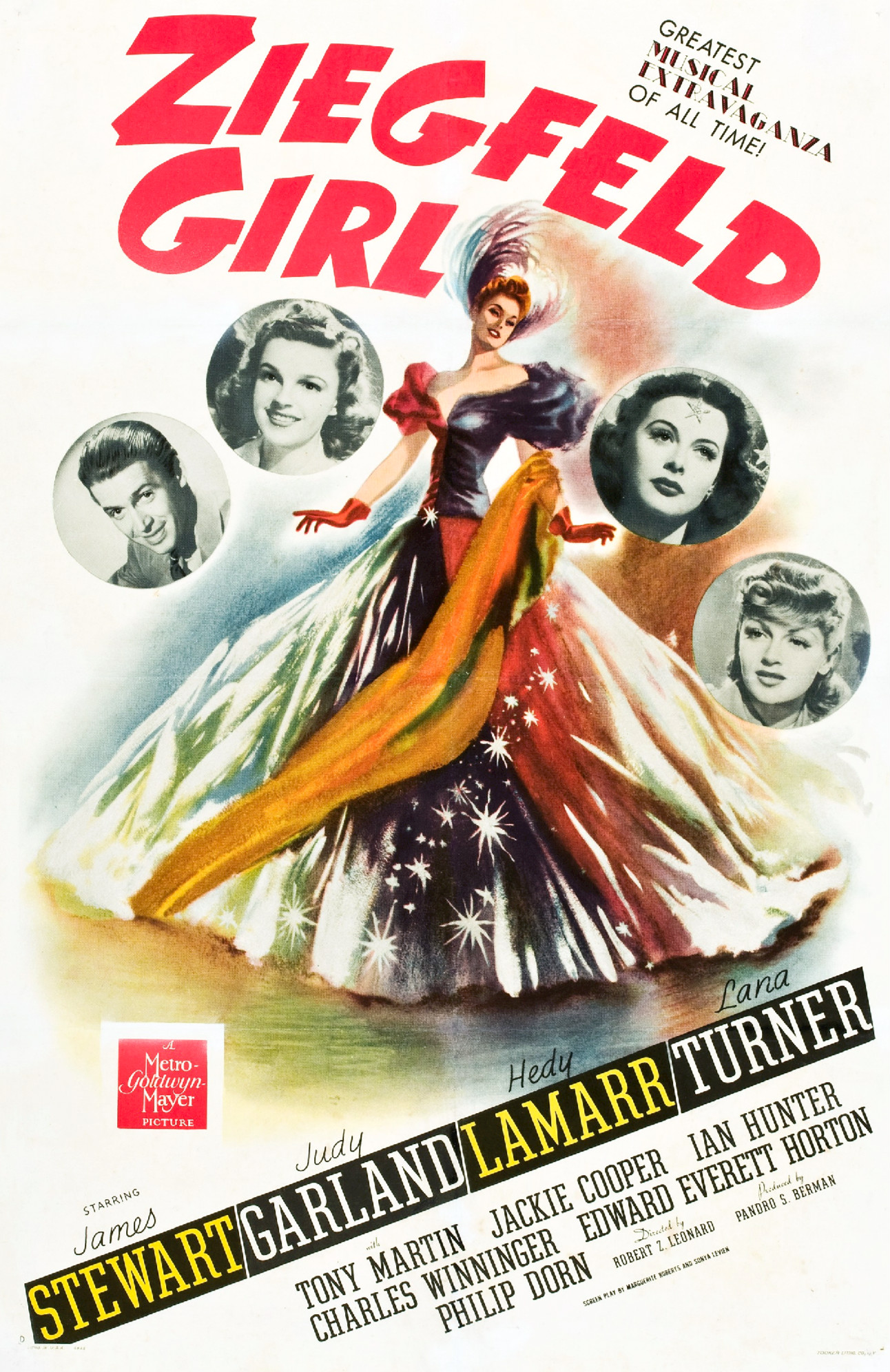
- Theatrical release poster
- Directed by: Robert Z. Leonard
- Screenplay by: Marguerite Roberts; Sonya Levien
- Story by: William Anthony McGuire
- Produced by: Pandro S. Berman
- Starring: James Stewart; Judy Garland; Hedy Lamarr; Lana Turner; Tony Martin; Jackie Cooper; Ian Hunter; Charles Winninger; Edward Everett Horton; Philip Dorn
- Cinematography: Ray June; Joseph Ruttenberg
- Edited by: Blanche Sewell
- Music by: Herbert Stothart
- Production company: Metro-Goldwyn-Mayer
- Distributed by: Loew's Inc.
- Release date: April 25, 1941
- Running time: 132 minutes
- Country: United States
- Language: English
- Budget: $1.5 million
- Box office: $3.1 million

Ziegfeld Girl is a 1941 American musical drama film directed by Robert Z. Leonard and starring James Stewart, Judy Garland, Hedy Lamarr, Lana Turner, Tony Martin, Jackie Cooper, Eve Arden, and Philip Dorn. Set in the 1920s, it tells the parallel stories of three women who become performers in the renowned Broadway show the Ziegfeld Follies. The film, which features musical numbers by Busby Berkeley, was produced by Metro-Goldwyn-Mayer. It was intended to be a 1938 sequel to the 1936 hit The Great Ziegfeld, and recycled some footage from the earlier film. Unlike that film and the later Ziegfeld Follies, Ziegfeld himself does not appear as a character.

Released on April 25, 1941, Ziegfeld Girl was a commercial hit, and grossed $3.1 million worldwide. The film has been noted as a significant entry in Lana Turner's filmography, elevating her profile and "launching her on a path towards mega-stardom."

== Plot ==
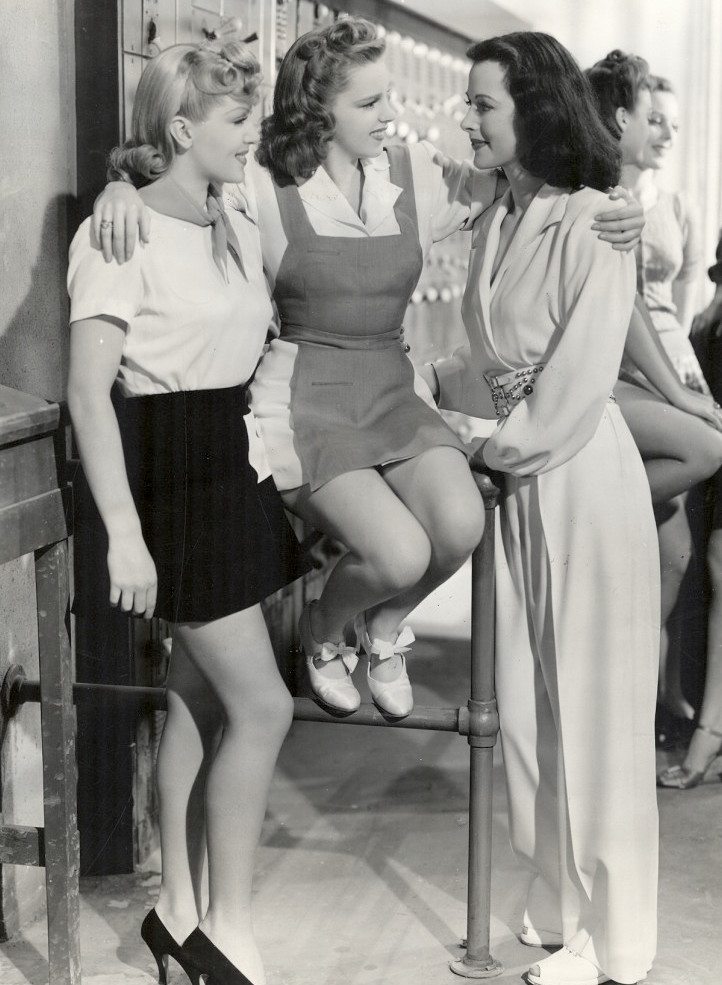
Lana Turner, Judy Garland, and Hedy Lamarr as three aspiring Ziegfeld girls

As happens every year, Florenz Ziegfeld is seeking new talent for the latest edition of his lavish Broadway revue, the Ziegfeld Follies. Three women, Sandra Kolter, Susan Gallagher, and Sheila Regan are among those selected to join the cast of glamorous "Ziegfeld girls", and become friends.

Sandra, a European beauty, is spotted and recruited while accompanying her violin virtuoso husband Franz to his audition for the show's orchestra. Franz is rejected because his musical skills are too good for the job, and Sandra becomes a showgirl over Franz' objections in order to earn needed income, causing a rift between the couple. Sandra quickly becomes a star and attracts the attentions of her singing co-star, Frank Merton. But after learning that Frank is married to a wife who loves him, Sandra reconciles with Franz and abandons her career to support him on a concert tour.

Susan, a seventeen-year-old from a theatrical family, is discovered performing a vaudeville act with her aging father. Although Susan is less physically beautiful than the other showgirls, her enormous singing talent lands her a featured role. Her father, not wanting to thwart her career, encourages her to stay in the Follies while he continues traveling on the vaudeville circuit alone. Susan worries about her father and eventually convinces the producers to give him a part in the show, where he proves to be a surprise hit.

Sheila, a working class elevator operator from Flatbush, Brooklyn, is torn between her love for truck driver Gil Young and her suddenly wealthy life as a showgirl, including a Park Avenue apartment, press coverage, and expensive gifts from rich male fans. After she turns down Gil's marriage proposal, he joins a bootlegging gang and ends up in prison. Sheila becomes a depressive alcoholic and is fired from the show after a drunken fall onstage. Seriously ill and unable to sustain her luxurious lifestyle, she moves back into her family's modest Flatbush home. Gil, newly released from prison, visits her and pledges his love, although he knows she is dying. Despite her precarious health, Sheila goes alone to the opening night of the latest Follies show, where she collapses in the theater. Sandra and Franz rush to her side as Susan, now a star, sings from the stage.

== Cast ==
- James Stewart as Gilbert Young
- Judy Garland as Susan Gallagher
- Hedy Lamarr as Sandra Kolter
- Lana Turner as Sheila Regan
- Tony Martin as Frank Merton
- Jackie Cooper as Jerry Regan
- Ian Hunter as Geoffrey Collis
- Charles Winninger as "Pop" Gallagher
- Edward Everett Horton as Noble Sage
- Philip Dorn as Franz Kolter
- Paul Kelly as John Slayton
- Eve Arden as Patsy Dixon
- Dan Dailey as Jimmy Walters
- Al Shean as Al
- Fay Holden as Mrs. Regan
- Mae Busch as Jenny

== Production ==
=== Development ===
Metro-Goldwyn-Mayer (MGM) began developing Ziegfeld Girl in 1936, the same year they released The Great Ziegfeld, another film focusing on the Ziegfeld Follies which proved to be a commercial hit for the studio. In May 1938, MGM announced that the project was being readied for production. Unlike the prior film, Ziegfeld Girl focused primarily on the female performers of the show.

=== Casting ===
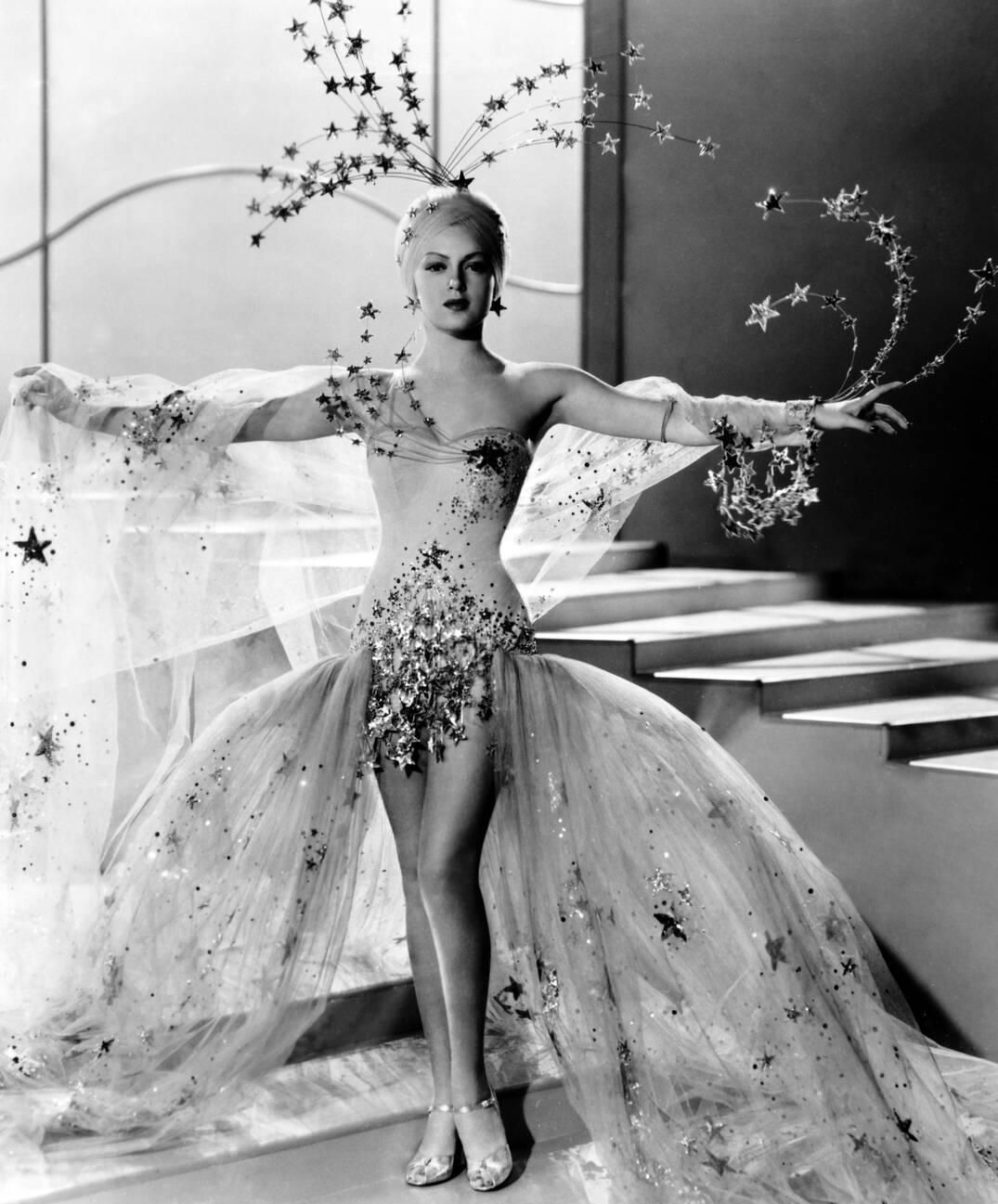
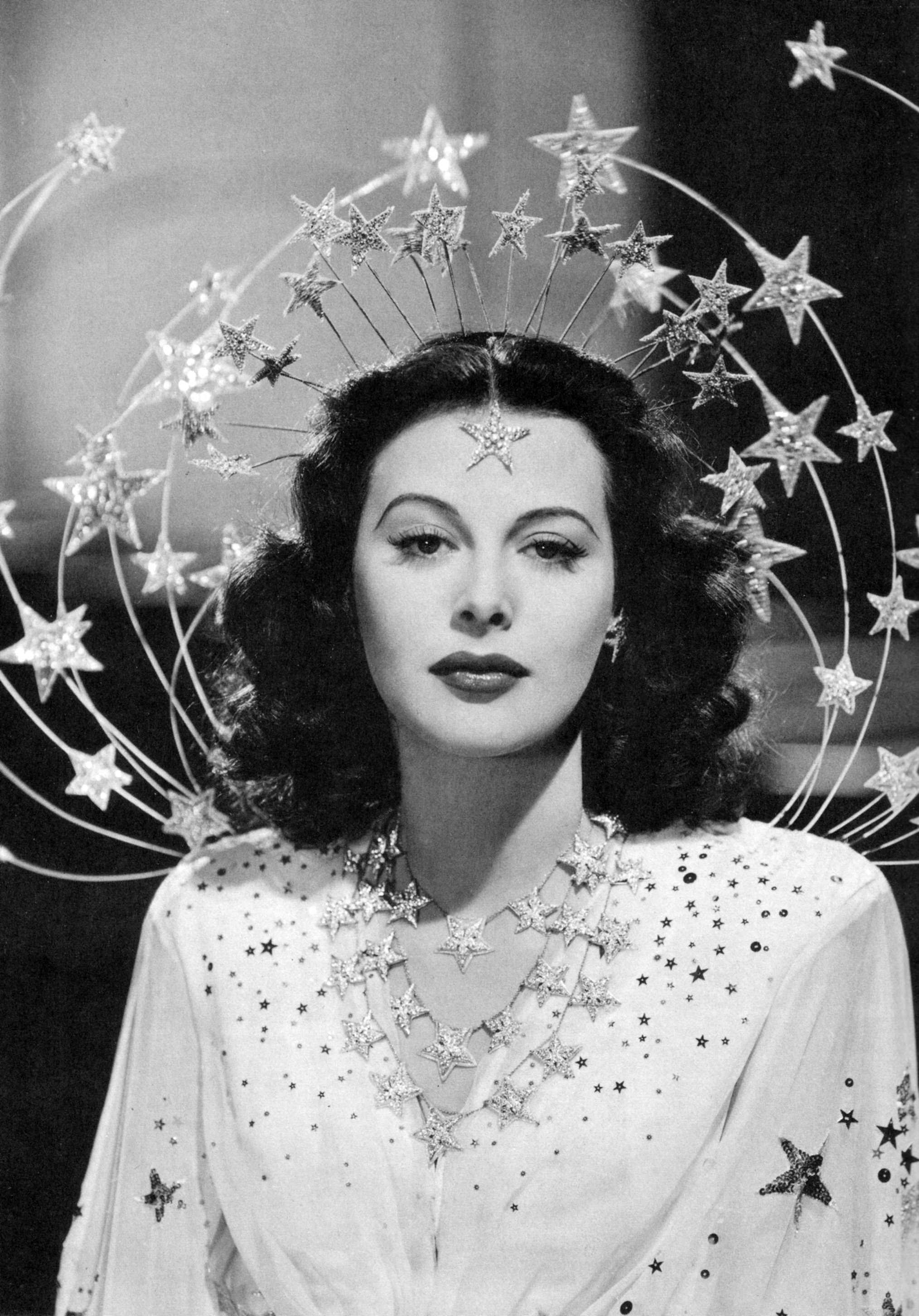
Lana Turner and Hedy Lamarr in Ziegfeld Girl

In July 1938, The Hollywood Reporter noted that Joan Crawford, Eleanor Powell, Margaret Sullavan, and Virginia Bruce were being considered to star in the film. However, when production was delayed by approximately two years, the cast was changed, with Hedy Lamarr, and Lana Turner appearing in the principal female roles alongside Powell. Powell was forced to drop out of production due to illness, after which Ann Miller was considered. The production was further delayed, after which Metro-Goldwyn-Mayer cast Judy Garland in the role of Susan Gallagher.

Turner's character, Sheila Regan, was based on Lillian Lorraine, an actual Ziegfeld follies star. According to Turner, her role in the film was expanded during production, and she was recurrently "handed new scenes not in the original script." She would later comment that the role was the first that got her truly "interested in acting."

The film marked actor James Stewart's last role for MGM before he enlisted in the United States Army during World War II. Stewart filmed Ziegfeld Girl concurrently alongside Pot o' Gold (1941).

=== Filming ===
Filming of Ziegfeld Girl began approximately in October 1940. The filming and recording process was completed by March 1941. To effectively capture the sequence in which Turner's character, Sheila, collapses on a staircase, twenty six takes were completed before director Leonard was satisfied.

In the original cut of the film, Sheila dies in the theater in the finale, but the ending was re-cut to leave her fate ambiguous after test audiences responded unfavorably to her character's death.

== Musical numbers ==
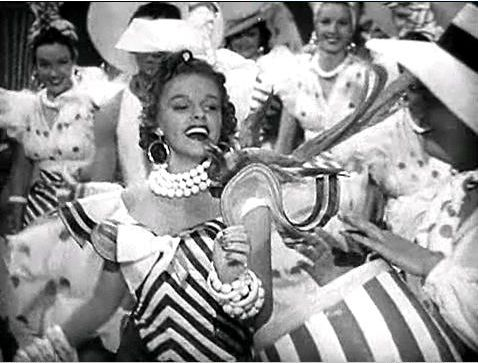
Judy Garland singing "Minnie from Trinidad" in Ziegfeld Girl

1. "Overture" – played by Orchestra and sung by Chorus
2. "Laugh? I Thought I'd Split My Sides" (music and lyrics by Roger Edens) – sung and danced by Judy Garland and Charles Winninger
3. "You Stepped Out of a Dream" (music by Nacio Herb Brown, lyrics by Gus Kahn) – sung by Tony Martin and Chorus
4. "I'm Always Chasing Rainbows" (music by Harry Carroll, lyrics by Joseph McCarthy) – sung by Judy Garland
5. "Caribbean Love Song" (music by Edens, lyrics by Ralph Freed) – sung by Tony Martin and Chorus
6. "Minnie from Trinidad" (Edens) – sung by Chorus and danced by Antonio and Rosario, then sung and danced by Judy Garland and Chorus
7. "Mr. Gallagher and Mr. Shean" – performed by Charles Winninger and Al Shean
8. "Ziegfeld Girls/You Gotta Pull Strings" (Edens) – sung by Judy Garland and Chorus
9. "You Stepped Out of a Dream (reprise)" – sung by Tony Martin
10. "You Never Looked So Beautiful" (music by Walter Donaldson, lyrics by Harold Adamson) – sung by Judy Garland and Chorus

=== Deleted song ===
A musical number sung by Garland, "We Must Have Music", was deleted from the final film in an effort to condense the running time. Only a fragment survives, as it was used in the MGM short A New Romance of Celluloid: We Must Have Music (1942).

== Release ==
Loew's Inc. released Ziegfeld Girl in the United States on April 25, 1941.

=== Home media ===
Warner Bros. Home Entertainment released Ziegfeld Girl on DVD in 2004 as part of the Judy Garland Signature Collection. Warner released the film again on DVD in a standard edition in 2010. On June 7, 2022, the Warner Archive Collection issued the film in Blu-ray format.

== Reception ==
=== Box office ===
According to MGM records, the film earned $1,891,000 in the US and Canada and $1,210,000 elsewhere resulting in a profit of $532,000.

=== Critical response ===
Ziegfeld Girl was favorably reviewed by critics, with Lana Turner receiving particular notice for her portrayal of Sheila Regan. In a review published by Kinematograph Weekly, it was noted: "The part is [Turner's] big chance and she takes it. All the hopes, disillusionment and the follies of youth are crystallized in her vital, memorable, glamorous and appealing performance.

The New York Times's review of the film uniformly praised the performances of Garland, Lamar, and Turner, but conceded that the film "emerges as another conventional musical show, only bigger... Ziegfeld Girl is another whirl on the same gorgeous merry-go-round, but with the horses slowing down."

=== Accolades ===
The film is recognized by American Film Institute in these lists:

- 2006: AFI's Greatest Movie Musicals – Nominated

== Legacy ==
Patrons at a movie theater are seen watching Ziegfeld Girl in MGM's Down in San Diego (1941). In Paul Morrissey's Women in Revolt, Candy Darling performs an impression of Lana Turner from the film.

The closing scene in which Turner's inebriated character descends a grand theatre staircase before falling at the bottom of the steps has been described as "one of the most memorable climaxes ever put on film."

== Sources ==
- Eliot, Mark (2006). Jimmy Stewart: A Biography. New York: Random House. ISBN 978-1-40005-222-6.
- Glancy, H. M., ed. (1992). "MGM Film Grosses, 1924–1948: The Eddie Mannix Ledger". Historical Journal of Film, Radio and Television. 12 (2). Los Angeles, California: Margaret Herrick Library, Center for Motion Picture Study: 127–144. ISSN 0143-9685.
- Green, Stanley (1999). Hollywood Musicals Year by Year (Second ed.). Milwaukee, Wisconsin: Hal Leonard Corporation. ISBN 978-0-634-00765-1.
- Neibaur, James L. (2022). The Films of Judy Garland. Jefferson, North Carolina: McFarland. ISBN 978-1-476-64702-9.
- Schechter, Scott (2006). Judy Garland: The Day-by-Day Chronicle of a Legend. Lanham, Maryland: Taylor Trade Publishing. ISBN 978-1-461-63555-0.
- Valentino, Lou (1976). The Films of Lana Turner. Seacaucus, New Jersey: Citadel Press. ISBN 978-0-8065-0553-4.
