= Ziegfeld girl =

Singers, showgirls, comediennes, and dancers in the Ziegfeld Follies

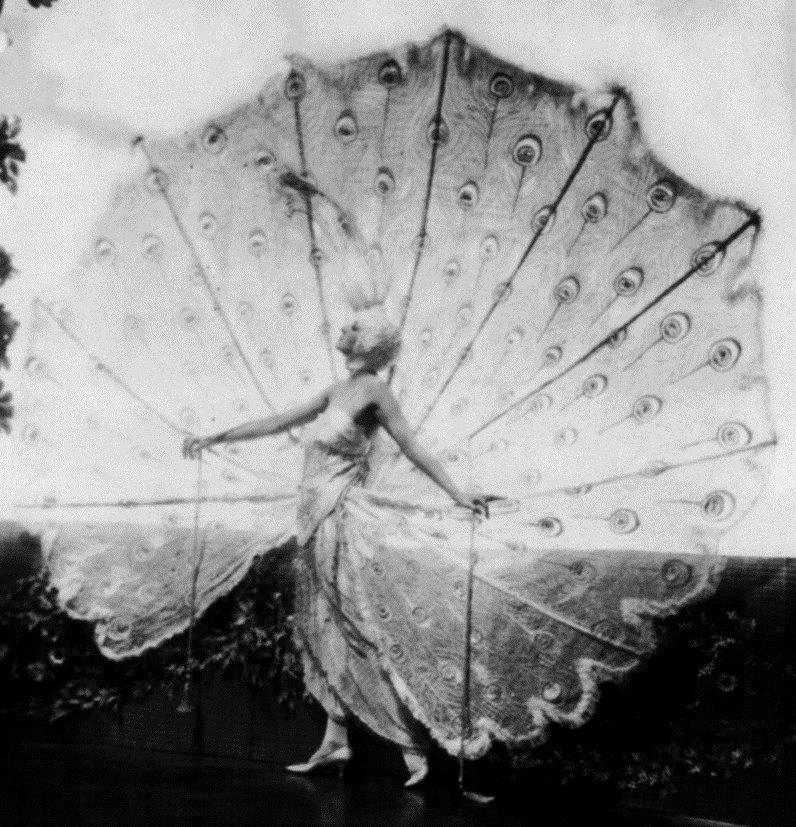
Dolores, Ziegfeld Girl.

The term "Ziegfeld Girl" (or "Ziegfeld Follies Girl") is used broadly to describe the "singers, showgirls, comediennes, [and] dancers" who appeared in Florenz Ziegfeld Jr.'s theatrical Broadway revue spectaculars known as the Ziegfeld Follies.

== Origin ==
When Ziegfeld's Follies began in 1907, advertisements for the show noted the "Ziegfeld Beauty Girls," along with other groups, including the "Gibson Bathing Girls," "Bewitching Peacock Girls," and many others. By 1912, Ziegfeld Girls were described as "ever-changing from widows to pink ladies, to cafe spirits, to troubadours, to drummers, to hockey girls, Purity League girls, and whatever girls—always shimmering, diverting and disappearing with the carefree abandon of butterflies," suggesting that the term referred generally to the women in the chorus.

In 1916, star solo dancer Ann Pennington, a Follies principal, was referred to as a Ziegfeld Follies Girl, indicating that the term applied headliners, members of the chorus, and any woman appearing in a Ziegfeld-branded production.

Broad use of the term has continued to the present, with Fanny Brice referred to in 2011 as a Ziegfeld Follies Girl. despite Brice not conforming "to the prevailing notion of female beauty and, more specifically, to the Ziegfeldian definition of it."

== More specific usage ==
Ziegfeld himself appears to have thought of Ziegfeld Girls with specific regard to the chorus. In 1921 he published a series of newspaper articles in which he promised to reveal "the real truth about the American chorus beauty." The articles outlined "where the chorus beauties come from, how they are selected for their jobs, how they keep beautiful and the secrets of their fascination for the tired businessman."

Ziegfeld Girl (or Girls) can also refer to the hierarchy of performers in Ziegfeld productions, particularly those staged by choreographer Ned Wayburn. Described as atop this hierarchy were the showgirls, tall women who modeled extravagant costumes; below them were the chorus girls, also known as "ponies" or "chickens," who danced and sang in group numbers.

== Ziegfeld as promoter and tastemaker of female beauty ==
One contemporary critic declared that Ziegfeld "must glorify the American Girl to the limit, but he must know in advance exactly where that limit is ... . As a barometer of New York, it [the Follies] cannot be excelled" and that audiences went to the shows "to worship – and to discover where the exact limit of propriety has moved."

Ziegfeld was credited as the "arbiter of beauty in America" and the "one man in America who knows better than any other what makes a girl beautiful ... . Out of America’s vast garden of girls, Ziegfeld picks the perfect blossoms. He knows beauty. If he did not the name of the Follies Girl would not stand, as it does today throughout the world, as the synonym for sheer loveliness, daintiness, charm, allure."

Modern scholars have pointed out the racial, ethnic, and other limitations to Ziegfeld's ideas of beauty. "His 'system' was a curious 'racism of beauty' ... . The Follies registered not simply the exclusion of color but the protection of whiteness – he forbade a suntan on any of his girls."

== Film portrayals ==
The 1936 film The Great Ziegfeld starring William Powell and Myrna Loy is a fictionalized and sanitized tribute to Florenz Ziegfeld Jr., and his Follies. 1941 saw release of the film Ziegfeld Girl, starring Judy Garland and James Stewart. The movie tells the story of three women who become Follies performers. Ziegfeld Follies is a 1945 film in which imagines Ziegfeld creating a new show from his perch in heaven. Such portrayals "emblazoned the term Ziegfeld Girl in popular culture as a shorthand for female glory, beauty, and glamour."
