= Robert Dawn =

American make-up artist

- Born: October 22, 1921; Hollywood, California, U.S.
- Died: July 9, 1983 (aged 61); Los Angeles, California, U.S.
- Occupation: Make-up artist
- Years active: 1950–1983
- Children: Jeff Dawn
- Parent: Jack Dawn (father)

Robert Dawn (October 22, 1921 – July 9, 1983) was an American make-up artist.

Dawn was born in Hollywood, California, the son of Anna Christine and Jack Dawn, a make-up artist. He attended and graduated from Commerce High School in San Francisco, California. He served as a fighter pilot in the []United States Air Force during World War II, which he earned the Distinguished Flying Cross, Purple Heart and Silver Star. After his discharge, he worked for Metro-Goldwyn-Mayer.

In 1971, Dawn won a Primetime Emmy Award in the category Outstanding Makeup for his work on the television program Mission: Impossible.

Dawn died on July 9, 1983 in Los Angeles, California, at the age of 61.
