= Nathan Gwilliam =

- Education: Brigham Young University (MBA)
- Occupations: Entrepreneur, Founder & CEO of Adoption.com
- Years active: 1997–present
- Organization(s): Elevati, Adoption.com, Adoption.org, AdoptionGifts.com, Adopting.org
- Board member of: National Council for Adoption
- Spouse: Crystal Ullery Gwilliam
- Children: 3

Nathan W. Gwilliam is an entrepreneur, who is the founder CEO of Adoption.com, which is the world's most-used adoption site, founded in 1997. Gwilliam has been inducted into the Adoption Hall of Fame by Family Services & Families Supporting Adoption in 2007 and was awarded the U.S. Congressional Coalition's Angels in Adoption award in 2017.

== Career ==
Gwilliam started his first venture, Adoption.com in 1997 after winning a BYU Business Plan Competition, hosted by BYU's Marriott School of Management, based on his business idea to use the Internet as a platform to help children get adopted.

In 2012, Nathan began working with Deseret Digital Media, where he helped the company to increase its online following from less than 100K to 40 million within a period of 18 months. He also launched FamilyShare.com, which reached 22 million monthly page views before he left the company. He was also involved with a new Brazilian airline, Azul, along with a number of other ventures, as reported by Post Register.

He served as the president of the More Good Foundation, a non-profit organization, which developed websites such as Christ.org, LDS.net, MormonChurch.com, ThomasMonson.com and ModernProphets.com. He has been a speaker at a TEDx conference and the National Adoption Conference. He serves on the board of directors of the National Council for Adoption.

He holds a Masters in Business Administration from Brigham Young University. Gwilliam has taught a course on Social innovation at Brigham Young University–Idaho. He is one of the founders of the BYU Center for Entrepreneurship.

== Awards and recognition ==
- He was inducted into the Adoption Hall of Fame by Family Services and Families Supporting Adoption in 2007.
- He received the Angels in Adoption award from the Congressional Coalition on Adoption Institute (CCAI) in 2015.
- He received the Best of the Decade award from the BYU Center for Entrepreneurship & Technology in 2005.
- He won the BYU Business Plan Competition, hosted by BYU's Marriott School of Management in 1997.
- He won the US West New Ventures Seed Money Competition in 1997.
