= Louis B. Meyer =

American judge

Louis B. Meyer (July 15, 1933 – December 25, 1999) was an American jurist who served as an associate justice of the North Carolina Supreme Court.

Meyer was born in Marion, North Carolina but spent most of his youth in Enfield, North Carolina, where his mentor was local attorney and politician Joseph Branch. He earned an undergraduate degree at Wake Forest College and then served as an officer in the United States Army's Chemical Corps. Meyer returned to Wake Forest to complete his law degree in 1960. He then clerked for North Carolina Supreme Court Justice R. Hunt Parker, who also hailed from Enfield.

After a stint as an agent for the Federal Bureau of Investigation, Meyer engaged in private practice in Wilson, North Carolina, where he also served as City Attorney.

Governor Jim Hunt appointed Meyer to the Supreme Court in 1981, where he served alongside Joseph Branch. Justice Meyer was the Court's senior Associate Justice for eight years, before he lost a bid for re-election in 1994. Governor Hunt then appointed him a Special Superior Court Judge. He retired in 1999, shortly before his death from cancer.
