= Greer Garson =

British and American actress (1904–1996)

Greer Garson CBE
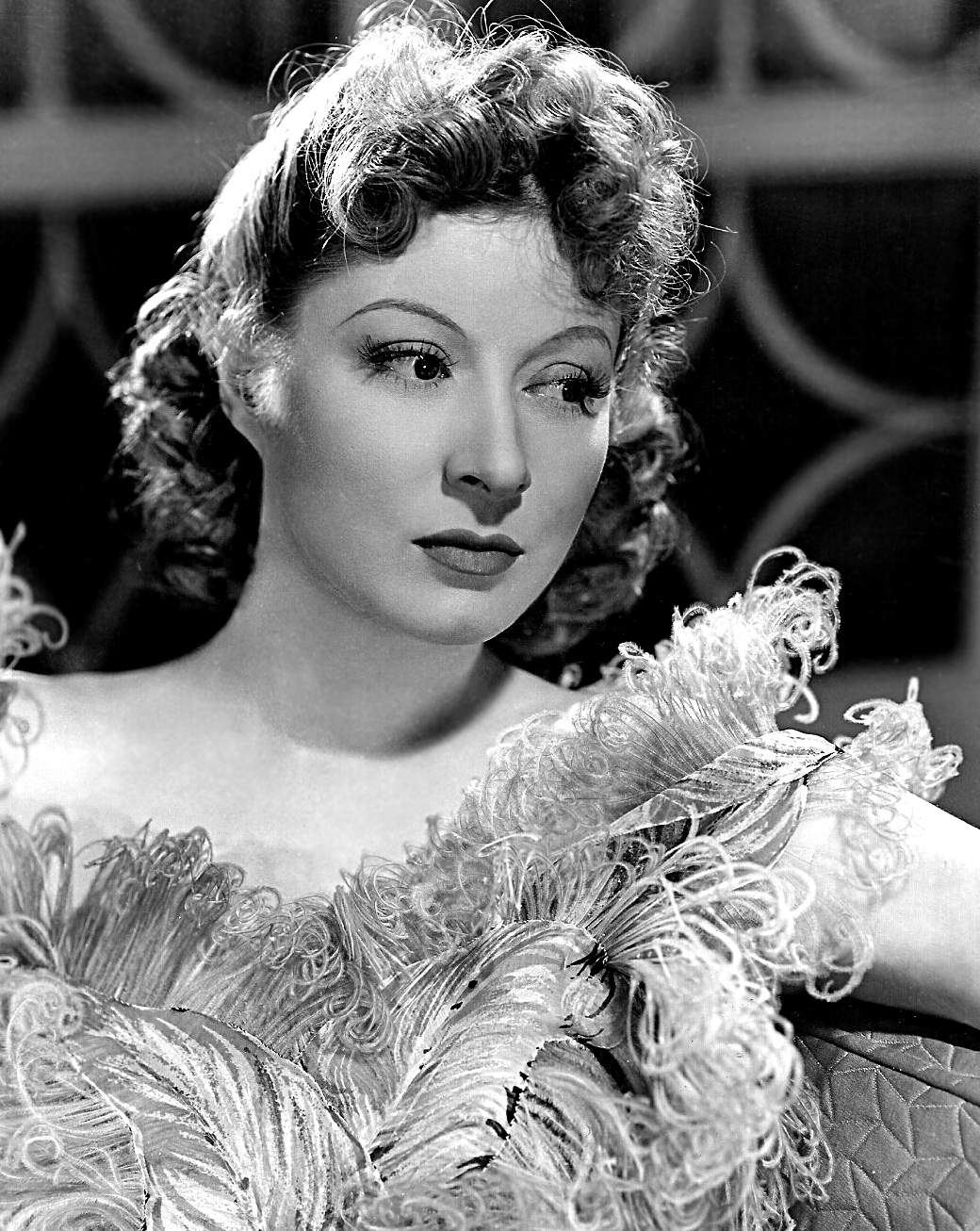
- Publicity photo of Garson, c. 1940s
- Born: Eileen Evelyn Greer Garson; 29 September 1904; Manor Park, Essex, England
- Died: 6 April 1996 (aged 91); Dallas, Texas, U.S.
- Resting place: Sparkman-Hillcrest Memorial Park Cemetery
- Citizenship: United Kingdom (1904–1996); United States (1951–1996)
- Education: King's College London; University of Grenoble
- Occupations: Actress; singer; philanthropist
- Years active: 1932–1986
- Political party: Republican
- Spouses: Edward Snelson (m. 1933; div. 1943); Richard Ney (m. 1943; div. 1947); Buddy Fogelson (m. 1949; died 1987)

Eileen Evelyn Greer Garson (29 September 1904 – 6 April 1996) was a British and American actress and singer. Known for playing graceful, noble, and dignified women in period and war dramas, she quickly rose to popularity during the Golden Age of Hollywood. A top star at Metro-Goldwyn-Mayer Studios (MGM), Garson was among the most popular stars of the 1940s, becoming one of the highest-paid actresses in the United States and Britain. From 1942 to 1946, she was consistently ranked by the Motion Picture Herald as one of America's top box-office draws.

Originally a stage and television actress in her native England, Garson signed a film contract in 1937 with Louis B. Mayer, the then-president of Metro-Goldwyn-Mayer (MGM). She found early critical success with her debut film, Goodbye, Mr. Chips (1939), which earned her her first Academy Award nomination for Best Actress. Following career-elevating performances in the romantic comedy Remember? (1939) and the period drama Pride and Prejudice (1940), Garson starred in a string of commercial and critical successes that earned her a record five consecutive Academy Award nominations for Blossoms in the Dust (1941), Mrs. Miniver (1942), Madame Curie (1943), Mrs. Parkington (1944), and The Valley of Decision (1945). She won once for Mrs. Miniver, the highest-grossing film of 1942.

By the late 1940s Garson's career had begun to decline, though she remained visibly active in film. Her successes during this period include the romantic drama Adventure (1946), the romantic comedy Julia Misbehaves (1948), and the 1953 adaptation of Shakespeare's Julius Caesar. She made a brief comeback in 1960, portraying first lady Eleanor Roosevelt in the film Sunrise at Campobello, for which she earned her final Academy Award nomination for Best Actress. She subsequently made sporadic appearances in film until her death in 1996.

Garson received numerous accolades throughout her career. She garnered seven Academy Award nominations for Best Actress, the fourth most-nominated woman, and received a Golden Globe for Best Actress in a Motion Picture – Drama. She received a star on the Hollywood Walk of Fame in 1960, and in 1993, Queen Elizabeth II recognised Garson's achievements by investing her as Commander of the Order of the British Empire (CBE).

== Early life ==
Garson was born on 29 September 1904 in Manor Park, East Ham (then in Essex, now part of Greater London), the only child of Nancy Sophia "Nina" (née Greer; 1880–1958) and George Garson (1865–1906), a commercial clerk in a London importing business. Her father was born in London to Scottish parents, and her mother was born at Drumalore (usually spelled as "Drumalure" or "Drumaloor"), a townland near Belturbet in County Cavan, Ireland. The name Greer is a contraction of MacGregor, another family name.

Her maternal grandfather, David Greer (c. 1848–1913) from Kilrea, County Londonderry, was an RIC sergeant later stationed in Castlewellan, County Down. In the 1870s or 1880s he became a land steward to the wealthy Annesley family, who built the town of Castlewellan. Whilst there, he lived in a large detached house named Clairemount, which was built on the lower part of what was known as Pig Street, locally known as the Back Way, near Shilliday's builder's yard. It was erroneously reported Greer Garson was born there (The Macmillan International Film Encyclopedia gives her place of birth as County Down, and her year of birth as 1908).

Following her father's death, she was raised by her mother and grew up mainly in Castlewellan. Garson was often ill as a child and was not popular at school. When she was four years old, she realized she wanted to be an actress after receiving praise for performing a recitation at a town hall. Garson read French and 18th-century literature at King's College London and did her postgraduate studies at the University of Grenoble. While aspiring to be an actress, she was appointed head of the research library of LINTAS in the marketing department of Lever Brothers. Her co-worker there, George Sanders, wrote in his autobiography that it was Garson who suggested he start a career in acting.

== Career ==
Garson's early professional appearances were on stage, starting at Birmingham Repertory Theatre in January 1932, when she was aged 27. She appeared on television during its earliest years (the late 1930s), most notably starring in a 30-minute production of an excerpt of Twelfth Night in May 1937, with Dorothy Black. These live transmissions were part of the BBC's pioneering television service from Alexandra Palace, and this is the first known instance of a Shakespeare play being performed on television. In 1936, she appeared in the West End in Charles Bennett's play Page From a Diary, and Noël Coward's play Mademoiselle.

Louis B. Mayer discovered Garson while he was in London looking for new talent. Garson was signed to a contract with MGM in late 1937. The actress suffered a back injury during her first 18 months at MGM while waiting for a role Mayer deemed worthy of her, and she nearly was cut from her contract.

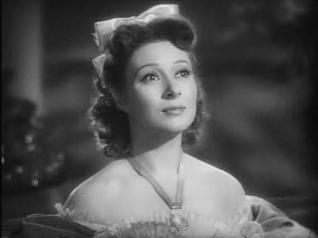
Garson in Pride and Prejudice (1940)

She began work on Goodbye, Mr. Chips, her first film, in late 1938, and she received her first Oscar nomination for the role. She received critical acclaim the next year for her role as Elizabeth Bennet in the 1940 film Pride and Prejudice.

Garson starred with Joan Crawford in When Ladies Meet, a 1941 poorly received and sanitized re-make of a pre-Code 1933 film of the same name, which had starred Ann Harding and Myrna Loy. The same year, she became a major box-office star with the sentimental Technicolor drama Blossoms in the Dust, which brought her the first of five consecutive Best Actress Oscar nominations, tying Bette Davis's record from 1938 to 1942, which still stands.

Garson starred in two Oscar-nominated films in 1942: Mrs. Miniver and Random Harvest. She won Best Actress for her performance as a strong British wife and mother protecting the homefront during the Second World War in Mrs. Miniver, which co-starred Walter Pidgeon. The Guinness Book of World Records credited her with the longest Oscar acceptance speech, at five minutes and 30 seconds, after which the Academy Awards instituted a time limit. Garson held this record until it was surpassed by Adrien Brody's speech at the 97th Academy Awards, eighty-two years later.

In Random Harvest she co-starred with Ronald Colman. The drama received seven Academy Award nominations, including Best Actor for Colman and Best Picture. The American Film Institute ranked it #36 on its list of 100 Greatest Love Stories of All Time, and it was one of Garson's favorite films.

Garson also received Oscar nominations for her performances in the films Madame Curie (1943), Mrs. Parkington (1944), and The Valley of Decision (1945). She frequently co-starred with Walter Pidgeon, ultimately making eight pictures with him: Blossoms in the Dust (1941), Mrs. Miniver (1942), Madame Curie, Mrs. Parkington, Julia Misbehaves (1948), That Forsyte Woman (1949), The Miniver Story (1950), and Scandal at Scourie (1953).

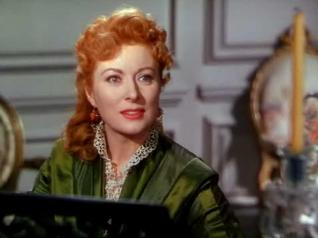
Garson in That Forsyte Woman (1949)

Garson starred with Clark Gable after his return from war service in Adventure (1945). The film was advertised with the catch-phrase "Gable's back, and Garson's got him!" Gable argued for "He Put the Arson in Garson"; she countered with "She Put the Able in Gable!"; thereafter, the safer catchphrase was selected.

She injured her back again while filming Desire Me in Monterey on 26 April 1946 when a wave knocked her and co-star Richard Hart from the rocks where they were rehearsing. A local fisherman and a film extra rescued Garson from the surf and potential undertow. She was bruised and in shock, and she required by doctors to rest for several days. The injury to her back required several surgeries over the coming years.

Garson's popularity declined somewhat in the late 1940s, but she remained a prominent film star until the mid-1950s. In 1951, she became a naturalised citizen of the United States. She made only a few films after her MGM contract expired in 1954. In 1958, she received a warm reception on Broadway in Auntie Mame, replacing Rosalind Russell, who had gone back to Hollywood to make the film version. In 1960, Garson received her seventh and final Oscar nomination for Sunrise at Campobello, playing Eleanor Roosevelt.

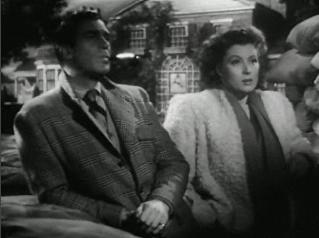
Garson and co-star Walter Pidgeon in The Miniver Story (1950), a sequel to the successful award-winning Mrs. Miniver

Greer was a special guest on an episode of the TV series Father Knows Best, playing herself. On 4 October 1956, Garson appeared with Reginald Gardiner as the first two guest stars of the series in the premiere of The Ford Show, Starring Tennessee Ernie Ford. She appeared as a mystery guest on What's My Line on 25 October 1953 and again on 6 April 1958 to promote her appearance on stage in Auntie Mame. She also served as a panelist rather than a guest on the What's My Line episode that aired on 12 May 1957.

She returned to MGM for a role in The Singing Nun (1966), starring Debbie Reynolds. Her last film appearance was in the 1967 Walt Disney feature The Happiest Millionaire, and she made infrequent television appearances afterward. In 1968, she narrated the children's television special The Little Drummer Boy. Her final role for television was in a 1982 episode of The Love Boat.

== Personal life ==
Garson was married three times. Her first marriage, on 28 September 1933, was to Edward Alec Abbot Snelson (1904–1992), later Sir Edward, a British civil servant who became a noted judge and expert in Indian affairs. After a honeymoon in Germany, he returned to his appointment at Nagpur, a town in central India, and she chose to return to her mother and the theatre in Britain. Snelson reportedly grieved at losing her and would watch multiple screenings of any film of hers that played in Nagpur. The marriage was not formally dissolved until 1943.

Her second marriage, on 24 July 1943, was to Richard Ney (1916–2004), a young actor who had played her son in Mrs. Miniver. The relationship was under constant scrutiny owing to their 12-year age difference. MGM claimed that Garson was merely three years older than Ney and tried to portray them as a happy couple, but the marriage was troubled. They divorced in 1947, after several attempts at reconciliation. Ney eventually became a stock-market analyst, financial consultant, and author.

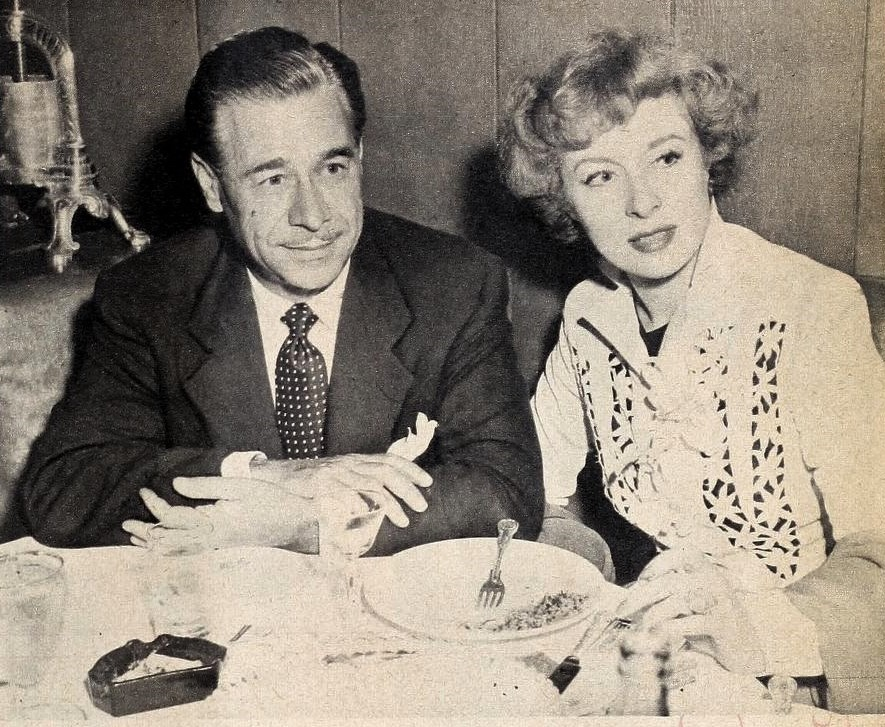
Buddy Fogelson and Garson in 1948

Her third marriage in 1949 was to E.E. "Buddy" Fogelson (1900–1987), a millionaire oilman and horse breeder. In 1967, the couple retired to their Forked Lightning Ranch in New Mexico. They purchased the US Hall of Fame champion Thoroughbred Ack Ack from the estate of Harry F. Guggenheim in 1971, and were successful as breeders. They also maintained a home in Dallas, where Garson funded the Greer Garson Theatre at Southern Methodist University. She founded a permanent endowment for the Fogelson Honors Forum at Texas Christian University (TCU), Buddy Fogelson's alma mater, in nearby Fort Worth.

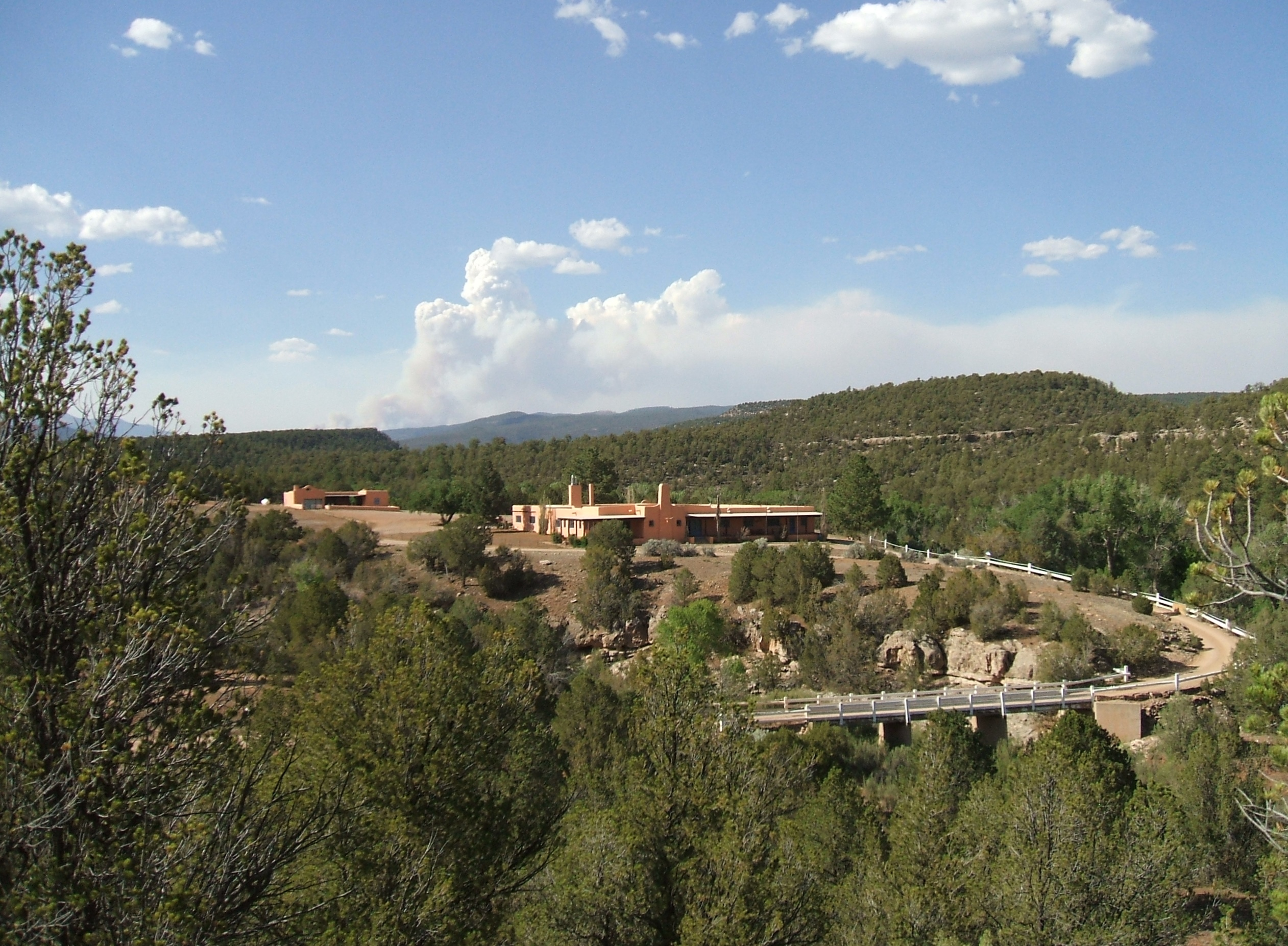
Residence at Forked Lightning Ranch, New Mexico

In 1951, Garson became a dual citizen of the United Kingdom and the United States. She was a registered Republican, and in 1966, she was asked to run for Congress on the Republican ticket against Democrat Earle Cabell but declined. She was a devout Presbyterian.

During her later years, Garson was recognised for her philanthropy and civic leadership. She donated several million dollars for the construction of the Greer Garson Theatre at both the Santa Fe University of Art and Design and at Southern Methodist University's Meadows School of the Arts on three conditions: 1) the stages be circular 2) the premiere production be A Midsummer Night's Dream and 3) they have large ladies' rooms.

=== Death ===
Garson lived her final years in a penthouse suite at the Presbyterian Hospital of Dallas, where she died from heart failure on 6 April 1996. She was 91. She is interred beside her husband in the Sparkman-Hillcrest Memorial Park Cemetery in Dallas.

== Honours ==
Garson received an honorary Doctor of Arts degree from Southern Methodist University in 1991.

In 1993, Queen Elizabeth II recognised Garson's achievements by investing her as Commander of the Order of the British Empire (CBE).

Garson received a star on the Hollywood Walk of Fame on 8 February 1960 located at 1651 Vine Street in Los Angeles.

== Filmography ==
Year	Title	Role	Notes
1939	Goodbye, Mr. Chips	Katherine Chipping	Nominated – Academy Award for Best Actress
1939	Remember?	Linda Bronson Holland	
1940	The Miracle of Sound	herself	color test for Blossoms in the Dust
1940	Pride and Prejudice	Elizabeth Bennet	
1941	Blossoms in the Dust	Edna Kahly Gladney	Nominated – Academy Award for Best Actress
1941	When Ladies Meet	Mrs. Claire Woodruff	
1942	Mrs. Miniver	Mrs. Kay Miniver	Academy Award for Best Actress
1942	Random Harvest	Paula Ridgeway/Margaret Hansen	
1943	The Youngest Profession	herself	
1943	Madame Curie	Marie Curie	Nominated – Academy Award for Best Actress
1944	Mrs. Parkington	Susie "Sparrow" Parkington	Nominated – Academy Award for Best Actress
1945	The Valley of Decision	Mary Rafferty	Nominated – Academy Award for Best Actress
1945	Adventure	Emily Sears	
1947	Desire Me	Marise Aubert	
1948	Julia Misbehaves	Julia Packett	
1949	That Forsyte Woman	Irene Forsyte	
1950	Screen Actors	Herself	short subject, uncredited
1950	The Miniver Story	Mrs. Kay Miniver	
1951	The Law and the Lady	Jane Hoskins	
1953	Scandal at Scourie	Mrs. Victoria McChesney	
1953	Julius Caesar	Calpurnia	
1954	Her Twelve Men	Jan Stewart	
1955	Strange Lady in Town	Dr. Julia Winslow Garth	
1956	The Little Foxes	Regina Giddens	TV movie
1960	Sunrise at Campobello	Eleanor Roosevelt	Golden Globe Award for Best Actress in a Motion Picture – Drama; National Board of Review Award for Best Actress; Nominated – Academy Award for Best Actress
1960	Pepe	herself	cameo
1960	Captain Brassbound's Conversion	Lady Cicely Waynflete	TV movie
1963	Invincible Mr. Disraeli	Mary Anne Disraeli	TV movie
1966	The Singing Nun	Mother Prioress	
1967	The Happiest Millionaire	Mrs. Cordelia Biddle	
1968	The Little Drummer Boy	"Our Story Teller"	credited as Miss Greer Garson
1974	Crown Matrimonial	Queen Mary	TV movie
1976	The Little Drummer Boy, Book II	"Our Story Teller"	credited as Miss Greer Garson
1978	Little Women	Aunt Kathryn March	TV miniseries
1986	Directed by William Wyler	herself	documentary

== Awards and nominations ==
Garson won an Academy Award out of 7 nominations for Best Actress, including the most consecutive nominations, from 1941 to 1945, tied with Bette Davis.

Garson was recognized by the Academy of Motion Picture Arts and Sciences for the following performances:

Year	Category	Work	Result
1939	Best Actress	Goodbye, Mr. Chips	Nominated
1941	Best Actress	Blossoms in the Dust	Nominated
1942	Best Actress	Mrs. Miniver	Won
1943	Best Actress	Madame Curie	Nominated
1944	Best Actress	Mrs. Parkington	Nominated
1945	Best Actress	The Valley of Decision	Nominated
1960	Best Actress	Sunrise at Campobello	Nominated

=== Box-office ranking ===
Year	US Rank	UK Rank	Ref.
1942	9th		
1943	6th	1st	
1944	6th	3rd	
1945	3rd	3rd	
1946	7th	4th	

== Television appearances ==
Year	Title	Role	Notes
1953; 1958	What's My Line	Mystery Guest	airdates: 25 October 1953; 6 April 1958
1955	Producers' Showcase	Elena Krug	Episode: "Reunion in Vienna"
1956–1960	General Electric Theater	Various	3 episodes
1957	Telephone Time	Liza Richardson	
1957	Father Knows Best	Herself	Episode "Kathy's Big Chance"
1962	The DuPont Show of the Week	Juliette Harben	
1965	The Red Skelton Hour Christmas Special	herself and Old Granny	
1968–1970	Rowan & Martin's Laugh-In	Guest Performer	5 episodes
1970	The Virginian	Frances B. Finch	Episode: "Lady At The Bar”
1982	The Love Boat	Alice Bailey	Episode: "The Tomorrow Lady"

== Radio appearances ==
Year	Program	Episode/source
1942	The Screen Guild Theater	The Philadelphia Story
1945	The Screen Guild Theater	My Favorite Wife
1946	Academy Award	Brief Encounter
1946	Lux Radio Theatre	Mrs. Parkington
1952	Lux Radio Theatre	The African Queen
1953	Suspense	Twas the Night Before Christmas

== Sources ==
- Katz, Ephraim (1994). The Macmillan International Film Encyclopedia. Pan Macmillan Limited. p. 511. ISBN 0-333-61601-4.
- Sarvady, Andrea (2006). Leading Ladies: The 50 Most Unforgettable Actresses of the Studio Era. San Francisco: Chronicle Books. ISBN 0811852482.
- Troyan, Michael (1999). A Rose for Mrs. Miniver: The Life of Greer Garson. Lexington: University Press of Kentucky. ISBN 978-0813120942.

Awards and achievements
Preceded by Charles Edward Wilson	Cover of Time magazine 20 December 1943	Succeeded by Patriarch Sergius
