= Congressional Coalition on Adoption Institute =

American non-profit organization

- Formation: 2001
- Headquarters: Washington, DC
- Executive Director: Kate McLean
- Website: www.ccainstitute.org

The Congressional Coalition on Adoption Institute (CCAI) is an American non-partisan, non-profit organization "dedicated to raising awareness about the millions of children around the world in need of permanent, safe, and loving families and to eliminating the barriers that hinder these children from realizing their basic right to a family." CCAI was founded in 2001 by advocates of children in the U.S. and around the world in need of families. CCAI seeks to support Congress' Adoption Caucus, the Congressional Coalition on Adoption, through educating and informing its members on adoption, foster care, and child welfare issues. Additionally, CCAI serves as a resource for Members of Congress and their staff through the offering of information, resources, and opportunities to engage in adoption and foster care programs year-round. This is done through congressional briefings, leadership training programs, educational trips, and other notable programs. The institute's work is entirely funded by donations and gifts from organizations and individuals. Kate McLean currently serves as the Executive Director of CCAI.

== History ==
Congressional Coalition on Adoption in the 118th United States Congress

In 1985, U.S. Senators Lloyd Bentsen (D-TX) and Gordon Humphrey (R-NH) and U.S. Representatives Tom Bliley (R-VA) and Jim Oberstar (D-MN) united to form the Congressional Coalition on Adoption (CCA) caucus. In 1998, the four CCA co-chairs at the time consisting of U.S. Representatives Tom Baily (R-VA) and Jim Oberstar (D-MN) and U.S. Senators Mary Landrieu (D-LA) and Larry Craig (R-ID) hired a full-time fellow, Kerry Marks Hasenbalg, to support the CCA. In 2001, the aforementioned CCA co-chairs and Hasenbalg founded CCAI. Today CCA is the largest bicameral, bipartisan caucus in Congress with 145 members of the 118th Congress.

== Angels in Adoption ==
CCAI is known for its annual Angels in Adoption award, which allows Members of Congress to nominate a constituent for their work in the adoption, foster care, and child welfare community. Angels in Adoption honorees travel to Washington, D.C. to celebrate their hard work and dedication to the issues and participate in special events to engage them in using their personal experience to effect change. Each year, there are several National Angels, individuals or groups that work on a national or global level, are honored. Past recipients include Alonzo Mourning, Darryl McDaniels, Laura Bush, Jane Seymour, Bruce Willis, Rosie O'Donnell, Muhammad Ali, Shonda Rhimes, Bill Klein and Jen Arnold, NBC Studios, Hallmark Channel, PEOPLE Magazine, Miranda and Luke Caldwell, This Is Us, Hoda Kotb, and Alec Ingold.

== Foster Youth Internship ==
The Foster Youth Internship Program places undergraduate and graduate college students who have been in the foster care system in congressional offices for a summer. The purpose of the program is "to bring attention to the policy and procedural barriers that trap children in the foster care system." The experience includes the researching and writing of a policy report that is presented to Members of Congress and the press, highlighting urgent and continuing issues in foster child welfare.

The Foster Youth Internship Program "began in 2003 as an effort to raise awareness to federal policymakers about the needs and unique perspectives of children and youth in foster care." To date, there are 234 alumni of the Foster Youth Internship Program.

== National Adoption Day ==
A coalition of national partners - The Dave Thomas Foundation for Adoption, Alliance for Children's Rights and Children's Action Network, and the Congressional Coalition on Adoption Institute - founded National Adoption day. The day is a "collective effort to raise awareness of the more than 123,000 children waiting to be adopted from foster care in the United States."

National Adoption Day is generally the Saturday before Thanksgiving. Courts open to finalize adoptions. More than 700,000 children in foster care have been adopted as part of National Adoption Day. Today, more than 400 cities across the United States participate in National Adoption Day events.
