= Blossoms in the Dust =

1941 film by Mervyn LeRoy

- Theatrical release poster
- Directed by: Mervyn LeRoy
- Screenplay by: Anita Loos
- Story by: Ralph Wheelwright
- Based on: Life of Edna Gladney
- Produced by: Irving Asher
- Starring: Greer Garson; Walter Pidgeon; Felix Bressart
- Cinematography: Karl Freund; W. Howard Greene
- Edited by: George Boemler
- Music by: Herbert Stothart
- Color process: Technicolor
- Production companies: Metro-Goldwyn-Mayer; Mervyn LeRoy Productions
- Distributed by: Loew's Inc.
- Release dates: June 26, 1941 (New York City); July 25, 1941 (US)
- Running time: 99 minutes
- Country: United States
- Language: English
- Budget: $1,112,000
- Box office: $2,658,000

Blossoms in the Dust is a 1941 American biographical drama film directed by Mervyn LeRoy and starring Greer Garson, Walter Pidgeon, Felix Bressart, Marsha Hunt, Fay Holden and Samuel S. Hinds. It tells the story of Edna Gladney, who helped orphaned children find homes and began a campaign to remove the word "illegitimate" from Texas birth certificates, despite the opposition of "good" citizens. The screenplay was by Anita Loos, with a story by Ralph Wheelwright. Some of the important aspects of her life fictionalized in the film are the fact that it was Edna herself who was born out of wedlock; she and Sam eloped on the eve of her marriage to someone else, and they had much more time together before his death (26 years) than given them in the film.

The film was one of the biggest hits of 1941 for Metro-Goldwyn-Mayer and began the rise of Greer Garson as one of the largest stars of the decade. Blossoms in the Dust won an Oscar for Best Art Direction-Interior Decoration, Color, and was nominated for Best Actress in a Leading Role (Garson), Best Cinematography, Color, and Best Picture.

== Plot ==
Edna Kahly and her adopted sister Charlotte are both to be married. However, when Charlotte's mother-in-law-to-be discovers that Charlotte was a foundling, she declares the wedding must not occur, and Charlotte kills herself from shame. Meanwhile, Edna falls for Sam Gladney, a brash cashier at a bank, and eventually marries him and moves with him to his home state of Texas.

Sam Gladney has a flour mill in Sherman, Texas, and at first, the couple has an idyllic life, though after a difficult delivery Sam is told Edna must have no more children. Several years later, their son dies, and Sam's effort to ease the pain she still endures by trying to get her to adopt a foundling fails. However, the little girl's story touches Edna's heart, and she starts a day care center for the children of working women.

Sam's business fails, and they must auction off all their possessions. The local women take over the day care center, and Sam and Edna move to Fort Worth, Texas, where he runs a mill. Edna starts a home for orphans and extramarital children, and works hard to find them appropriate homes, matching parents to child by interests and inclinations. Sam becomes ill and dies. When a young woman comes to try to donate a large sum of money, Edna worms the young woman's story out of her, and discovers she is in a similar situation as poor Charlotte. After insisting the girl's fiancé won't care that her parents weren't married, she decides to campaign to have the word "illegitimate" removed from Texas birth certificates.

After succeeding in her quest, Edna faces one more trial—the little crippled boy Tony she raised from an infant and nursed back to health, finds a new home at last. She is reluctant to let him go, but as she takes in two new foundlings, brought to her door by a policeman, she at last realizes it is for the best.

== Cast ==
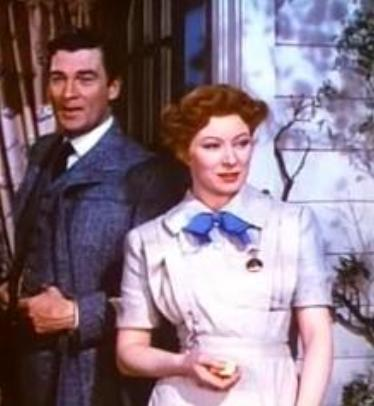
Greer Garson and Walter Pidgeon

- Greer Garson as Edna Kahly Gladney
- Walter Pidgeon as Samuel 'Sam' Gladney
- Felix Bressart as Doctor Max Breslar
- Marsha Hunt as Charlotte Kahly
- Fay Holden as Mrs. Kahly
- Samuel S. Hinds as Mr. George Kahly
- Kathleen Howard as Mrs. Sarah Keats
- George Lessey as Mr. Keats
- William Henry as Allan Keats
- Henry O'Neill as Judge Hartford
- John Eldredge as Damon McPherson, Edna's Fiancé
- Clinton Rosemond as Zeke, Edna's Servant
- Theresa Harris as Cleo, Edna's Maid
- Charles Arnt as G. Harrington Hedger
- Cecil Cunningham as Mrs. Gilworth
- Ann Morriss as Mrs. Loring
- Richard Nichols as Sammy
- Pat Barker as Tony
- Marc Lawrence as LaVerne

== Production ==
The film was directed by Mervyn LeRoy and produced by Irving Asher. Anita Loos wrote the screenplay, and Ralph Wheelwright the story. Mildred Cram, Dorothy Yost and Hugo Butler made uncredited contributions to the script.

== Reception ==
When the film premiered at Radio City Music Hall, Bosley Crowther of The New York Times wrote "There is a shade too much of shining nobility in this film, too often tiny fingers tug deliberately on the heartstrings. And the dramatic continuity seems less spontaneous than contrived. The career of Mrs. Gladney is drawn out over a tedious stretch of time. But it is an affecting story and one which commands great respect ... As pure inspirational drama with a pleasant flavor of romance, 'Blossoms in the Dust' should reach a great many hearts."

Variety called the film "a worthy production on which much care has been showered by Mervyn LeRoy and others, but it is questionable as to draft. Though meritorious as to production value, cast and background, plus being in color, the picture fails to impress as being big." The review also called the film "a trifle over-done on occasion."

Film Daily wrote "Mervyn LeRoy is at his directorial best here, and makes the most of the fine screenplay fashioned by Anita Loos ... Greer Garson's performance is rousing, and that of Walter Pidgeon, as her husband, as inspiring as will be found in any '40-'41 picture."

John Mosher of The New Yorker wrote "The subject matter receives very conventional treatment of the inspirational order, with an occasional tear, and, of course, a sad smile here and there."

Blossoms in the Dust placed tenth on Film Daily's year-end poll of 548 critics naming the best films of 1941.

== Academy Awards ==
Wins

- Best Art Direction (Color): Art Direction: Cedric Gibbons, Urie McCleary; Interior Decoration: Edwin B. Willis

Nominations

- Outstanding Motion Picture: Metro-Goldwyn-Mayer
- Best Actress: Greer Garson
- Best Cinematography (Color): Karl Freund, W. Howard Greene

== Box office ==
According to MGM records, the film earned $1,272,000 in the U.S. and Canada and $1,386,000 elsewhere, resulting in a profit of $552,000.
