= Body swap appearances in media =

Storytelling device appearing in media

Body swaps have been a common storytelling device in fiction media. The concept was first popularized in Western Anglophone culture by the personal identity chapter of John Locke's Essay Concerning Human Understanding, Novels such as Vice Versa (1882) and Freaky Friday (1972) have inspired numerous film adaptations and retellings, as well as television series and episodes, many with titles derived from "Freaky Friday". In 2013, Disney Channel held a Freaky Freakend with seven shows that featured body-swapping episodes. (Note: On Disney Channel USA, a special marathon of body swap episodes was aired from April 5, 2013 until April 7 at 8/7c. The series with body swap are: Dog With a Blog, Austin & Ally, Jessie, Gravity Falls, Phineas and Ferb, A.N.T. Farm and Shake It Up. The marathon was also aired on June 8 in Latin America, along with Disney movie The Wizards Return: Alex vs. Alex.)

This list features exchanges between two beings, and thus excludes similar phenomena of body hopping, spirit possession, transmigration, and avatars, unless the target being's mind is conversely placed in the source's body. It also excludes age transformations that are sometimes reviewed or promoted as body swaps, as in the movies Big and 17 Again; identity/role swaps, typically between clones, look-alikes, or doppelgängers; and characters with multiple personalities.

== Books ==
Title	Author	Year	Characters	Method / notes	Reference
''Du bist ich und ich bin du'' (転校生!おれがあいつであいつがおれで)	Hisashi Yamanaka	1980	A boy and girl switch bodies	Magic	
Agent Cormac book series	Neal Asher	2001–2008	Cormac, Mika, Aiden, Stanton, Dragon, Crane	Artificial intelligence transfers to different bodies; downloads of human minds into artificial carriers and cyborg bodies	
Airhead book series	Meg Cabot	2008	Emerson Watts (tomboy) and Nikki Howard (teenage supermodel)	Brain transplant (Note: In the second book of the Airhead series, Being Nikki, it is revealed that Nikki's brain was transplanted into another body and that she wants her body back.)	
The Anubis Gates	Tim Powers	1983	Doyle and Dog-Face Joe		OCLC 10259963
The Barking Ghost	R. L. Stine	1995	Cooper, Margaret and two dogs	spell / Goosebumps series #32	OCLC 32441922
Body Swap	Sylvia McNicoll	2018	Hallie (age 15), Susan (age 82)	Characters swap souls after a car accident	OCLC 1013167479
Captain Underpants and the Big, Bad Battle of the Bionic Booger Boy	Dav Pilkey	2003	Melvin and Mr. Krupp	Combine-O-Tron 2000	
Charlotte Sometimes	Penelope Farmer	1969	Teenage girls in 1918 and 1963	the bed they sleep in	
Curse the Dawn	Karen Chance	2009	Cassandra and Pritkin		OCLC 233548351
Cerberus: A Wolf in the Fold	Jack Chalker	1982	various characters	Warden powers to swap minds of two sleeping participants	OCLC 277005501
Dragon Princess	S. Andrew Swann	2014	Thief, princess, dragon and wizard	Wizard's spell	
An Exchange of Souls	Barry Pain	1911			
Flip	Martyn Bedford	2011	Teenager and another boy		OCLC 639518192
Flip	Ngozi Ukazu	2025	Chi-Chi, a Nigerian-American girl, and Flip, a white boy		
Fox Eyes	Mordicai Gerstein	2001	Martin and a fox	Staring at fox's eyes	OCLC 44750632
Freaky Monday	Mary Rodgers and Heather Hach	2009	Teenage girl and teacher she dislikes	Thematic sequel to Freaky Friday	
Freaky Friday	Mary Rodgers	1972	Teenage Annabel Andrews and her mother		
Gender Blender	Blake Nelson	2006	Emma and Tom		OCLC 60590030
Graveyard School; Book #11	Tom B Stone	1996	Maria and Dr. Morthouse		
Help! I'm Trapped... book series	Todd Strasser	1993–2011	Multiple characters	Mind-swapping machine	
The Identity Matrix	Jack L. Chalker	1982	Victor Gonser swaps with various women	Alien powers	
Katie Kazoo, Switcheroo series	Nancy E. Krulik	2002–2010	Katie Kazoo and various characters (Note: This title is debatable whether it is a true body swap as one of the recipients is in a coma or not accounted for in the story. * 18 Again * Dream a Little Dream)	Magic wind (originally wish from a falling star)	
Laughing Gas	P. G. Wodehouse	1936	Reggie and Joey	Laughing gas	
La Machine	René Belletto	1990	Psychiatrist and serial killer	Experiment with a mind-reading device, resulting in unintended body swap	
The Master Mind of Mars	Edgar Rice Burroughs	1928	multiple people	Brain transplant	
Me and My Cat?	Satoshi Kitamura	1999	Nicholas (young boy) and Leonardo (his pet cat)	Witch's spell	
The Mind Cage	A.E. van Vogt	1957	A.E. van Vogt	Invention swaps minds between bodies. but never back between the same	
Mindswap	Robert Sheckley	1966	Marvin Flynn and various alien people	Mind-swapping technology	OCLC 18565280
The Ogre Downstairs	Diana Wynne Jones	1974	Step-brothers	Magical chemistry set	
Prelude to a Kiss (play)	Craig Lucas	1988	Old man and bride	Kiss	
Rascal Does Not Dream of Siscon Idol	Hajime Kamoshida	2015	Nodoka Toyohama and Mai Sakurajima	Adolescent syndrome	
The Stolen	Alex Shearer	2003	Young girl and elderly witch	Magic potion	
Summer Switch	Mary Rodgers	1982	Preteen Ben Andrews and his father	Freaky Friday stories, book 3	
Switched	R. L. Stine	1995	Nicole and Lucy	Fear Street series #31	OCLC 32331235
The Dosadi Experiment	Frank Herbert	1982	McKee and woman	Whipping Star series #2	OCLC 32331235
The Tale of the Body Thief	Anne Rice	1992	Lestat de Lioncourt and Raglan James		
The Toilet of Doom	Michael Lawrence	2001	Jiggy McCue and Angie	Magic toilet	OCLC 50802367
Tiffany Twisted	Alison Tyler	2006	Tiffany and Kurt		OCLC 64554840
Turnabout	Thorne Smith	1931	Tim and Sally Willows	Egyptian idol	
Vice Versa: A Lesson to Fathers	F. Anstey	1882	Paul and Dick Bultitude (father and son)	Wish from magic stone	
The Victorian Chaise-Longue	Marghanita Laski	1953	Modern woman wakes to find herself in the body of a Victorian woman		
Why I'm Afraid of Bees	R. L. Stine	1994	Gary and a bee	Goosebumps series #17	OCLC 29815540
Strange Journey	Maud Cairnes	1935	Lady Elizabeth and Polly Wilkinson		

== Short stories ==
Title	Author	Year	Characters	Method / notes	Reference
Avatar	Théophile Gautier	1856		Magic	
New Bodies for Old	Jack Vance	1950		collected 1982 as "Chateau d'If"	
The Great Keinplatz Experiment	Arthur Conan Doyle	1885		mesmerism	
Icchapuran, Ichchhapuran (Fulfilling the wish)	Rabindranath Tagore	1895			
Lejana (The Distances)	Julio Cortázar	1949	Woman and beggar	Hug	
Mefisto in Onyx	Harlan Ellison	1993			
Queen of the Martian Catacombs	Leigh Brackett	1949	Eric John Stark	Alien technology	
The Shadow Out of Time	H. P. Lovecraft	1936 (cut); 1939 (restored)	Nathaniel Wingate Peaslee	Psychic temporal transfer	
The Story of the Late Mr Elvesham	H. G. Wells	1896			
The Thing on the Doorstep	H. P. Lovecraft	1937	Edward Derby / Asenath Waite	Magic	
Transformation	Mary Shelley	1830	Young man and dwarf	Supernatural ritual	
The Galoshes of Fortune	Hans Christian Andersen	1838	A watchman and his lieutenant	Magic galoshes	

== Operas ==
Title	Author	Year	Characters	Method / notes	Reference
The Gentleman in Black	Frederic Clay and W. S. Gilbert	1870		Magic	
Happy Arcadia	Frederic Clay and W. S. Gilbert	1872		Magic	

== Video games ==
Title	Developer / Publisher	Year	Characters	Method / notes	Reference
The 3rd Birthday	Square Enix	2011	Eve and Aya	Soul transference	
Atelier Lydie & Suelle: The Alchemists and the Mysterious Paintings	Koei Tecmo	2018	Lucia and Sue	Drink potion magic	
Atelier Meruru: The Apprentice of Arland	PhyreEngine/ Gust Co. Ltd.	2011	Meruru and Keina	Switching pie	
Bugs Bunny & Taz: Time Busters	Artificial Mind and Movement / Infogrames	2000	Taz and a Frankenstein monster	Mind-swapping device	
Chrono Cross	Square	1999	Serge and Lynx	Dragon tear	
Digimon Rumble Arena 2	Bandai Games	2004	Playable character	Special power	
Dragon Ball Z games	various	various	Captain Ginyu	Ginyu's ability	
Fire Emblem Awakening	Nintendo	2012	Henry and Sumia	Body swap spell	
Fire Emblem Fates	Nintendo	2015–16	Ophelia and Soleil	Body swap spell	
Last Stop	Annapurna Interactive	2021	Jack and John	Magic Bracelet	
Marvel Ultimate Alliance	Activision	2006	Playable character and a demonic soul	Demonic soul's special ability	
Mobile Legends: Adventure	Moonton	2019	Layla, Kimmy, and Chang'e		
Paper Mario: The Thousand-Year Door	Intelligent Systems / Nintendo	2004	Mario and Creepy Steeple Boss		
Pitfall: The Lost Expedition	various / Activision	2004	Harry and a monkey		
Ragnarok	Norsehelm	1992-1995	Main character	Scroll	
Resident Evil: Revelations 2	Capcom	2015	Natalia and Alex Wesker	Transferring consciousness	
Roblox	Roblox Corporation	2005	Playable character	Body swap potion	
Super Smash Bros. Brawl	Nintendo	2008	Playable character	Random Poké Ball ability by Manaphy	
Tales of Rebirth	Namco	2004	Agarte and Claire	Force of Moon ability	
The Witch's House MV	Fummy	2018	Ellen and Viola	Body swap spell	
Whacked!	Presto / Microsoft	2002	Main character	Special power (red button)	
Xenoblade Chronicles 3	Monolith Soft / Nintendo	2022	Mio and M	M's power	

== Graphic novels and manga ==
Some graphic novels and manga series feature stories that center around a body swap, while others have a story arc or a character that body swaps. These include anime and live-action adaptations if the original storyline was in the manga or comic.

List of graphic novels and comics featuring body swaps
Title	Author	Year (Note: Indicates the year the graphic novel or tankōbon was published rather than the issue.)	Characters	Method / notes	Reference
Anti/hero	Demitria Lunetta & Kate Karyus Quinn	2020	Piper Parajo and Sloane MacBrute	Machine	#1-4
Crosswind	Gail Simone	2017-	Chicago hitman and Seattle housewife	man with power to transfer souls	Series
Captain Marvel	Kelly Thompson	2019	Captain Marvel and Doctor Strange	Spell by Enchantress	Issue #6-7
Daredevil	Stan Lee	1968	Daredevil and Doctor Doom	Body Transferral Ray	Issue #37
Harley & Ivy Meet Betty & Veronica	Paul Dini	2018	Harley Quinn and Betty Cooper, Poison Ivy and Veronica Lodge	Sabrina and Zatanna's spells	Series
Invader Zim	Jhonen Vasquez	2017	Zim and Gaz; Dib and GIR	Machine malfunction	Issue #21
Marvel Team-Up	Eve Ewing	2019	Spider-Man and Kamala Khan	Mind-swapping device	Issue #1-3
Moon Girl And Devil Dinosaur	Brandon Montclare, Amy Reeder, and Jordan Ifueko	2016-	Moon Girl and Devil Dinosaur	Moon Girl's Inhuman abilities	Series
Sensational Wonder Woman Special	Stephanie Collins	2022	Wonder Woman and Devyn	Circe's spell	Special Edition
Suicide Squad Black Files	Mike W. Barr	2018	Katana and Lady Eve	Soul-taking gone wrong	Series
The Amazing Spider-Man	Dan Slott	2012	Spider-Man and Doctor Octopus	Brain-swapping Octobot	"Dying Wish" storyline
The Superior Spider-Man	Dan Slott	2013-2014	Spider-Man and Doctor Octopus	Brain-swapping Octobot	Series
X-Men	Various authors	1989-2018	Psylocke (Betsy Braddock and Kwannon)	Body swap by Spiral	Franchise wide

List of manga featuring body swaps
Title	Author	Year	Characters	Gender	Method / notes	Reference
The 100 Girlfriends Who Really, Really, Really, Really, Really, Really Love You	Nakamura Rikito, Nozawa Yukiko	2019	All of the Girls Swap Bodies	FtF	Chemical Explosion	Volume 3, Chapter 23
The 100 Girlfriends Who Really, Really, Really, Really, Really, Really Love You	Nakamura Rikito, Nozawa Yukiko	2019	Rentarou and Momiji	MtF	Chemical Explosion	Chapter 119
Air Gear	Oogure Ito	2002-2012	Adachi and The President of the United States	MtF		Volume 24, Chapter 227–228
Angel Sanctuary	Kaori Yuki	1997-1998	Setsuna and Alexiel			Volumes 8-11
Artificial Girl (Jinzou Shoujo)	Natsume Satoru	2000	Misumi to Nina	MtF	Brain Transplant	Series
Asmodeus Will Not Give Up	Yuuto	2017-2020	Ritsu and Eligos	MtF	Spell	Chapter 43
Berserk of Gluttony	Isshiki Ichika	2018-	Fay and Roxy	MtF	Spell	Volume 9, Chapter 42
Big Brother is Little Sister and Little Sister is Big Brother (Ani ga Imouto de Imouto ga Ani de)	Kurumatani Haruko	2012-2014	Youta and Hikaru	MtF	Car Accident	Series
CHANGE-R	Ueno Nito	2015	Hikari and a Criminal	MtF	Through a Kiss	Series
Classroom for Heroes (Eiyuu Kyoushitsu)	Shin Araki	2017-	Blade and Arnest, Jessica and Sarah, Sophitia and Claire, Iona and Cú Chulainn, Lunaria and Maria, Clay and Leonard	MtF, FtF, MtM	Brain Swap Machine	Volume 20, Chapter 77
Corporate Slave and Gal Switch Places (Shachiku to Gal ga Irekawarimashite)	Taki Rei	2018-2019	Enmoto and Riko	MtF	Unknown	Series
Countrouble	Akinari Nao	2009-2012	Kouta and Asaka	MtF	Spell	Volume 5, Chapter 22
Cross Method in the Dead of Night (Mayonaka no X Giten)	Tamaguchi Mikoto	2014-2016	Various Characters	MtF, MtM, FtF	Magic Doors	Series
Damn Goddess of Poverty (Binbougami ga!)	Sukeno Yoshiaki	2008-2012	Momiji and Ichiko	FtF	Misfortune God Item: Bandagement Replacer~	Volume 4, Chapter 18
Demon Lord Exchange!!	Hozumi Riya	2023-2024	The Demon Lord and Filina	MtF	Ritual	Series
Don't Cry, Little Demon Lord	Enchi	2017-2019	Maou and Fatalite	FtF	Personality Swapping Device	Volume 3, Chapter 21
Dragon Ball	Akira Toriyama	1991	Captain Ginyu and Goku, Captain Ginyu and Frog	MtM	Captain Ginyu's Special Ability	Volumes 23–24
Exchange Teacher	Touson	2024	Delinquent Student and Shy Teacher	MtF	Lighting Strike	Oneshot
Expressionless Kashiwada-san and Emotional Oota-kun	Azuma Fuyu	2018	Kashiwada and Oota	MtF	Head Collision	Volume 2, Chapter 25.5
Female Knight Goblin (Onna Kishi Goblin)	Ondi	2022-2023	Female Knight and Goblin	FtG	God Granted Wish	Series
Futaba's Family Twins (Futaba-san Chi no Kyoudai)	Tsukudani Norio	2017	Otohiro and Neiko	MtF	Fell asleep watching "Your Name"	Volume 4, Chapter 33–34
Have you Seen Me?	Takatsuki Nagi	2019	Salary-Man and Highschool Girl	MtF	Unknown	Series
Hero no Himitsu	Imamura Yoko	2009	Yellow Star and White Star	MtF	Malfunctioning Bracelet	Volume 1, Chapter 5
Hina Change	Kajikawa Gaku	2019	Hina and Ren	MtF	Mind Swap Power	Series
Hope You're Happy, Lemon	Mizuki Kishikawa	2023	Sunao and Lemon	MtF	Shooting star	Series
Hungry Marie	Tamura Ryuuhei	2017	Taiga and Marie Antoinette	MtF	Religious Ritual	Series
I'm a Fujoshi and that guy's a Yuri-Otaku (Ore ga Fujoshi de Aitsu ga Yuri-ota de)	Ajiichi	2016-2017	Reiji and Mitsuru	MtF	Vengeful Ghost	Series
I am Alice: Body Swap in Wonderland	VisualWorks, Ayumi Kanou	2014-	Makoto and Alice		Magic Book	Series
Inazuma Eleven Go Anthology!	Momiji Aki	2013	Tenma and Aoi		Head Collision	Chapter 6
Inside Mari	Shūzō Oshimi	2012-2016	A shut-in guy and teenage girl	MtF	Unknown	Series
Instant Teen: Just Add Nuts	Haruka Fukushima	2001	Natsumi and Asuma		Miracle nuts side effect	Volume 2, Extra Chapter
JM	Ohtake Masao	2023-	J and Megumi	MtF, FtM	Head Collision	Series
JoJo's Bizarre Adventure Part 5: Golden Wind	Hirohiko Araki	1998	Mista and Trish, Giorno and Narancia, Buccelati and Diavolo, Polnareff and The Turtle	MtF, MtM, MtA	Chariot Requiem's Item causes "Soul Swap"	Volume 16 Chapters 133-
Kämpfer	Toshihiko Tsukiji	2008-2013	Various characters	MtF	Unknown	
Karate Idols (Doll-Kara)	Kazuyoshi Ishii	2017-	Ishii to Kei	MtF	Talking Cat gives Ishii another chance at Life	Series
Kodomo Dorobou	Yamabuki	2023-	Minori and a Thief	MtF	Head Collision	Series
Kokoro Connect	Sadanatsu Anda	2010-	Taichi, Iori, Himeko, Yoshifumi and Yui	MtF, MtM, FtF	Mysterious being known as "Heartseed"	Series
Kusakabe-kun Another	Shindou Arashi	2012-2013	Kusakabe and Hoshino	MtF	Fell Down the Stairs	Series
Ma O Eru! ~Daily Life of a Corporate Slave OL and Another World’s Demon King Who Exchanged Bodies~ (Maoeru! Shachiku OL to Isekai Saikyou Maou Irekawari Seikatsu)	Yamigishiki Karuto	2021-	Office Lady and the Demon Lord	MtF	Bicycle Crash	Series
Mone-san's Overly Serious Way of Dating (Mone-san no Majime Sugiru Tsukiakata)	Gotou Masaki	2017	Mone and Nobu	MtF	Collision	Volume 4, Chapter 38.5
Mr. Clice	Akimoto Osamu	1985	Mr. Clice and a Deceased Female Tennis Player	MtF	Brain Swap Surgery	Series
Murder Princess	Sekihiko Inui	2005–2007	Princess and bounty hunter		Fall	Series
My Barbaric Girlfriend (Boku to Kanojo no XXX)	Morinaga Ai	2001-2011	Nanako and Akira	MtF	Grandpa's Invention	Series
My Dead Boyfriend Came Back as a High School Girl	Tokiwa Rokukou	2018	Boyfriend and a Highschool Girl	MtF	Possession after Death	Oneshot
No Side	Ikeda Fumiharu	1994-1997	Yuuji and a Highschool Girl	MtF	Possession after Death	Series
One Morning I Woke Up (Aru Asa Okitara)	Nisio Isin	2014	Highschool Boy and Highschool Girl	MtF	Unknown	Oneshot
One Piece	Eiichiro Oda	2012	Sanji to Nami, Nami to Franky, Franky to Chopper, Chopper to Sanji, Smoker and Tashigi	MtF, MtM	Trafalgar Law's Ope Ope no Mi Ability "Shambles"	Volumes 67–68
Outreijou	Keiso	2023-	Multiple Yakuza to High School Girls	MtF	Bus Accident	Series
Orange Chocolate	Yamada Nanpei	2008-2013	Chiro and Ritsu	MtF	Wish	Series
Pink WoMan ★ Change (Momoiro Ome-chen)	Souda Momo	2015-2016	Sara and Yuuhi	MtF	Robot Explosion	Series
Psycho x Past: Ryouki Satsujin Sennyuu	Honda Shingo	2022-	Godai is sent into the bodies of victims in the past	MtM, MtF	Paranormal Police Investigator	Series
Quantum Mistake	Son Eun-ho and Choi Myung-su	1998–2006	Kang Too-jee and Woo Soo-choi		Malfunctioning Device	Series
Reversal Honey (Gyakuten Honey)	Tokeino Hari	2001-2009	Kengo and Mitsuka	MtF	Curse	Series
Rosario + Vampire Season II	Akihisa Ikeda	2007	Yukari Sendo and Fangfang Huang	MtF	Yukari's Magical Item: Ishin Deshin	Volume 6, Chapter 25
Seishun no Hekireki	Yasuko	2021-	Shizuka and Kouki	MtF		Series
Shishunki Bitter Change	Mayao Masayoshi	2012–2019	Yuuta and Yui	MtF	Fall	Series
Shuffle School (Shuffle Gakuen)	Hori Yuusuke	2014	Various Characters	MtF, FtF, MtM	Malfunctioning Machine	Series
Spider-Man: Octopus-Girl	Furuhashi Hideyuki	2023	Doctor Octopus and Otoha	MtF	Unknown	Series
Super Ball Girls	Kaneshiro Muneyuki	2022-	Ichi and Eliza	MtF	Merge	Chapter 43-
Swap Swap	Tomekichi	2015	Haruko and Natsuko	FtF	Kiss	Series
Do You Like Drooping Breasts? Busty Girl Anthology Comic (Tawawa na Oppai wa Suki desu ka?)	Various	2017-	Yamato and Chiyori	MtF	Unexplained	Chapter 21
Though I Am an Inept Villainess (Futsutsuka na Akujo de wa Gozaimasu ga: Sūgū Chōso Torikae Den)	Satsuki Nakamura	2020-	Kou Reirin and Shu Keigetsu	FtF	A spell cast by Shu Keigetsu	Series
To-Love-Ru	Saki Hasemi, Kentaro Yabuki	2007-2009	Rito and A Dog	MtA	Lala's Maru-Maru Change-Kun Body-Swapping Machine	Volume 5, Chapters 43–44
To-Love-Ru	Saki Hasemi, Kentaro Yabuki	2007–2009	Lala and Haruna	FtF	Lala's Maru-Maru Change-Kun Body-Swapping Machine	Volume 12, Chapter 105
To-Love-Ru	Saki Hasemi, Kentaro Yabuki	2007-2009	Mikan and Yami	FtF	Lala's Maru-Maru Change-Kun Body-Swapping Machine	Volume 16, Chapter 139
To-Love-Ru Darkness	Saki Hasemi, Kentaro Yabuki	2010-2017	Rito and Haruna	MtF	Lala's Round-Round Change-Kun Body-Swapping Machine	Volume 5, Chapter 18
Two-Person Switch (Futari Switch)	Hiramoto Akira	2022-	Shinichi and Ichigo	MtF	Magical Bitter Gourd	Series
Tying the Knot with an Amagami Sister (Amagami-san Chi no Enmusubi)	Naito Marcey	2021-	Uryuu and Yuna	MtF	Shrine God Swaps Their Bodies	Volume 7, Chapters 57–62
Urusei Yatsura	Rumiko Takahashi		Ataru and Ten		Magic earmufffs	Chapter 72
The Witch's House: The Diary of Ellen	Fummy	2019	Ellen and Viola		Spell	Chapter 8
The World God Only Knows	Tamiki Wakaki	2010	Keima and Yui	MtF	Mysterious Headache	Volume 9, Chapters 82–89
The World God Only Knows	Tamiki Wakaki	2013	Keima and his younger self		Spell	Volume 20
Yamada-kun and the Seven Witches	Miki Yoshikawa	2013-	Ryū Yamada, Urara Shiraishi and others		Kiss	Series
Your and My Secret	Ai Morinaga	2001–2011	Uehara and Momoi		Body Swap Machine	Series

== Music ==
Title	Artist	Year	Characters	Method / notes	Reference
The Chicken in Black	Johnny Cash	1984	Johnny Cash, a bank robber, and a chicken	Brain transplant	
Freaky Friday	Lil Dicky featuring Chris Brown	2018	Lil Dicky and Chris Brown	Activated by a lil dicky's fortune cookie	
Running Up That Hill	Kate Bush	1985	Woman and her male partner	Deal with God	

== See also ==
- Mind uploading in fiction
- Whole-body transplants in popular culture
