= Turnabout (Smith novel) =

1931 fantasy novel by Thorne Smith

- First edition cover
- Author: Thorne Smith
- Genre: Fantasy comedy
- Publisher: Doubleday, Doran & Company
- Publication date: September 1931
- Media type: Print (hardcover)

Turnabout is a 1931 comedic fantasy novel, the eighth by American author Thorne Smith, in which a husband and wife swap bodies. It inspired a play, a movie, and a television series. It was included in James Cawthorn and Michael Moorcock's Fantasy: The 100 Best Books.

== Plot ==
The year is presumably 1931 or thereabouts, the year the novel was published. The country is in the midst of both Prohibition and The Depression.

The Depression gets some small mention, but only an occasional nod: the characters are for the most part solidly middle class. Most of the action takes place in Cliffside, an upscale suburb of New York City, perhaps an allusion to Cliffside Park, New Jersey. Life in suburbia is central to the plot.

Prohibition gets more attention and a few direct references. Several of the characters consume copious amounts of alcohol, including especially the lead character, Tim Willows. Tim and Sally Willows have liquor in their bedroom, drink from flasks, and even get cups of liquor from the receptionist at the advertising agency where Tim works. Nobody is punished for violating prohibition-era alcohol laws.

Sally and Tim Willows live in Cliffside. Tim works at the National Advertising Agency. Sally does not work.

Mr. Ram is a small, ages-old Egyptian statue given to Tim and Sally by Tim's Uncle Dick Willows. Mr. Ram stands in the Willows’ bedroom, observing the couple's constant marital bickering, judging, and eventually acting. After they both complain about how easy the other's life is – Tim goes to his work, gets out of the house and does interesting things, like flirting with girls, while Sally gets to lie around the house all day and do whatever she pleases – they state twice in front of Mr. Ram that they wish they could change places. Mr. Ram makes it happen.

Prior to the switch, Sally's flirtation with unattached Carl Bentley becomes a flashpoint of their marital conflict. Although the novel eventually makes clear that Sally and Carl have never consummated their relationship, the flirting is obvious to their neighbors and even Tim. It leads to Tim nearly murdering Carl. Tim goes so far as stuffing Carl's presumed-dead body in the coal furnace, with Sally's help, and it is only the next day on the commuter train when Tim and Carl meet by chance that Tim discovers that Carl is alive. After the body switch, Sally must go to the advertising agency to work as Tim, while Tim must stay at home and do social functions. Unfortunately, Tim – as Sally – gets pregnant. The circumstance is barely alluded to. They constantly slip-up in disguising their role change, a source of much of the book's comedy, but Tim and Sally manage to pull off a successful advertising campaign for union suits, embarrass Carl Bentley and ruin his reputation. Tim gives birth while still in Sally's body, but switches back very soon afterward.

=== Body-swap plot mechanism ===
Turnabout was not the first body-swapping literary work. An earlier husband-wife swap novel was Avatar by Théophile Gautier (1856). Anthony Slide wrote in his biography of Thorne Smith:

The most obvious, but unacknowledged, influence in the writings of Thorne Smith is the English novelist Thomas Anstey Guthrie (1856-1934), who wrote under the pseudonym of F. Anstey. His first novel, Vice Versa, published in 1882, contains elements to be found in Smith’s work. It is rightfully argued that all “body swap” plots owe much to Anstey’s writings.

However, Smith himself pointed to none of these – or any earlier literary source – as his inspiration for Turnabout.

== Reception ==
Bruce Catton, was the book reviewer for Newspaper Enterprise Association, a Scripps-Howard syndicate. His review was featured in many newspapers during September and October 1931. He wrote, “The story of their adventures is about as funny as anything I have seen all year, if not a little funnier. It is also, now and then, somewhat improper, if that bothers you.”

Turnabout is Number 40 in James Cawthorn and Michel Moorcock's Fantasy: The 100 Best Books. The authors write, “Lighthearted as the novel is, it still makes some pertinent comments upon the routine indignities inflicted upon women in man’s world.”

== Adaptations ==
There is no clear evidence that Turnabout directly influenced the many subsequent body-swap works. It is certain that the Turnabout novel directly inspired a play, the Turnabout movie, and many years later, a short-lived television series.

The play If I were You opened in 1938. Brooks Atkinson of The New York Times writes that it was “suggested by an idea in a novel by the late Thorne Smith.” It is witchcraft rather than an Egyptian god that forces the transformation, and the lead is not Tim Willows in advertising, but Arthur Blunt, the chemist. The play closed after only eight performances.

The Turnabout movie adaptation was released in 1940, starring John Hubbard as Tim and Carole Landis as Sally. It did not feature the Carl Bentley story arc, nor did Tim give birth in the movie version. Anthony Slide notes, “The novel takes only four chapters before the transformation takes place. The film takes a long, thirty-seven minutes,” and “Unlike the novel, the transformation lasts only one day.”

A television series was produced in 1979. It was canceled after seven episodes.

The young adult novel Freaky Friday, which eventually spawned three movies is acknowledged to have been influenced by Turnabout. Author Mary Rodgers recalled "that when I was fourteen, I’d read and loved a novel called Turnabout, by Thorne Smith. Vicious and hilarious, it was something I thought I could emulate in children’s fiction … for teens." A Freaky Friday movie was first released in 1976 with Barbara Harris and Jodie Foster starring, and a second version in 2003 with Jamie Lee Curtis and Lindsey Lohan.

Keith R.A. DeCandido writes that the last broadcast episode of the original Star Trek series "Turnabout Intruder” (June 3, 1969) “… was partly inspired by the 1931 novel Turnabout by Thorne Smith, in which a husband and wife switch bodies.” In the episode, Captain Kirk’s persona is switched with Dr. Janice Lester.
