= Airhead (disambiguation) =

An airhead is a military term for the endpoint of an airborne assault

Airhead may also refer to:

- Airhead (slang), a common derogatory term for a foolish or ignorant person

== Arts and media ==
=== Music ===
- Airhead (band), a British indie-pop group active in the early 1990s, best known for their minor UK hit "Funny How"
- "Airhead" (song), a 1988 song by Thomas Dolby
- "Airhead", a song by Millencolin from their 1995 album Life on a Plate
- "Airhead", a song by Seaway from their 2015 album Colour Blind
- "Airhead", a song by KMFDM from their 2024 album Let Go
- "Airhead", a 2001 song by Girls@Play
- "Airheads", a song by Queen Drummer Roger Taylor from his 1981 solo album Fun in Space

=== Other media ===
- Airhead (novel), a 2008 novel by Meg Cabot
- Airheads, a 1994 comedy movie

== Other uses ==
- Airhead (motorcycle), a line of motorcycles featuring the air-cooled flat twin Type 247 engine, built by BMW since 1923
- Airheads (candy), a popular candy manufactured by Perfetti Van Melle
