= Three-bagger =

Three-bagger may refer to:

- Triple (baseball), a three-base hit in baseball
- Three-volume novel, three books by one author bound in one volume
  - The Thorne Smith Three-Bagger, by Thorne Smith
