= Little Boy Lost (novel) =

1949 novel by Marghanita Laski

- First edition (UK)
- Author: Marghanita Laski
- Language: English
- Publisher: Cresset Press (UK); Houghton Mifflin (US)
- Publication date: December 1949
- Publication place: United Kingdom
- Media type: Print (Hardback & Paperback)
- ISBN: 0-248-98373-3 (first edition, hardback)

Little Boy Lost is a dramatic novel by Marghanita Laski that was published in 1949. It was republished in 2001 by Persephone Books.

== Plot ==
The novel focuses on Hilary Wainwright, an English man, on the search for his lost son in the ruins of post-war France. Hilary at first resents the child he finds because it interferes with memories of his late wife.

== Film, TV or theatrical adaptations ==
A motion picture version of the same title starring Bing Crosby was released in 1953.

== Reception ==
In 1949 Kirkus Reviews found Little Boy Lost "An inescapably affecting story where sentiment is edged by bitterness", while in 2001 Nicholas Lezard of The Guardian wrote "If you like a novel that expertly puts you through the wringer, this is the one." and "This is haunting stuff."
