= Margaret Roach =

American actress (1921–1964)

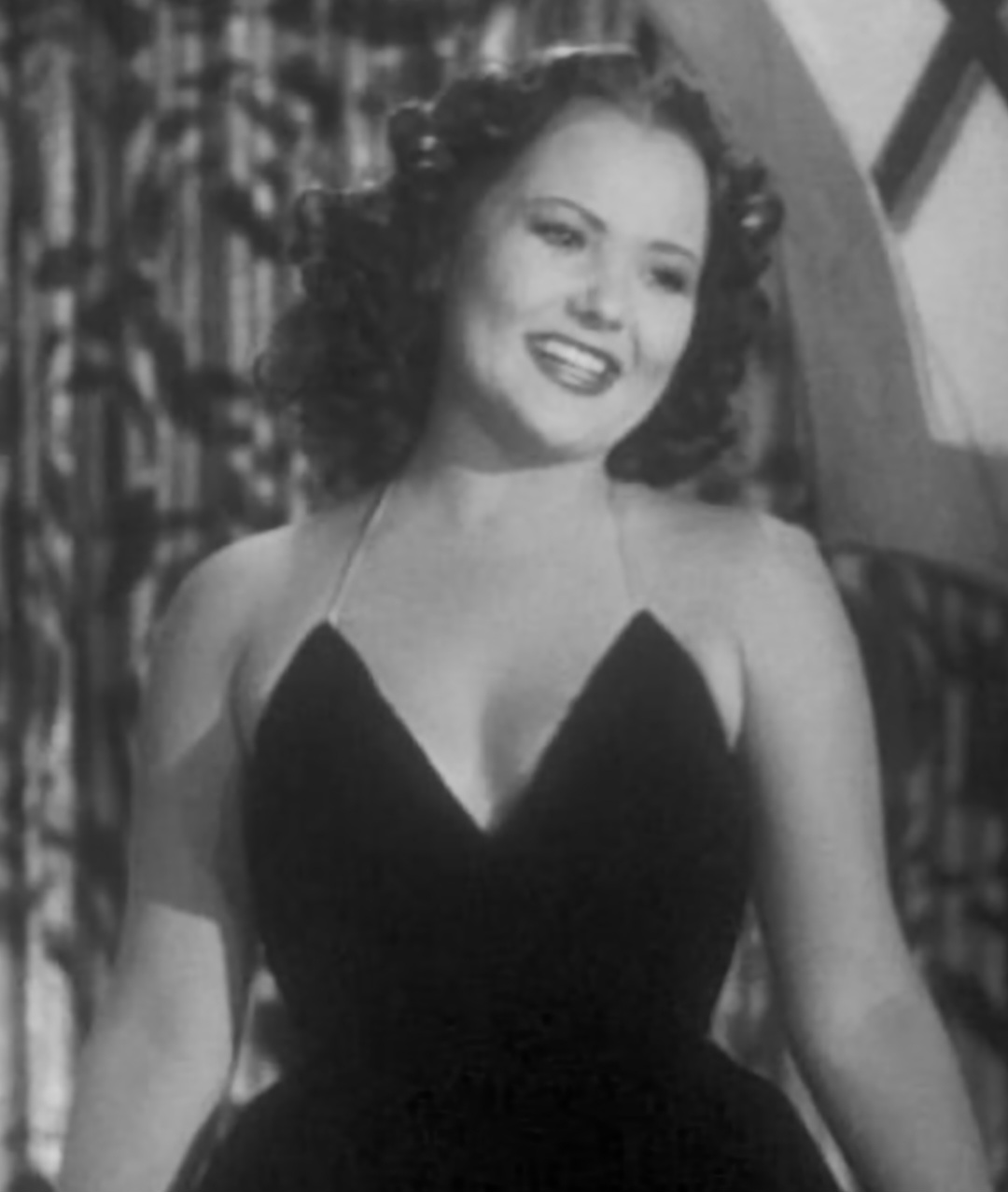
- Roach in Road Show (1941)
- Born: Margaret Mae Roach; March 15, 1921; Los Angeles, California, U.S.
- Died: November 22, 1964 (aged 43); Washoe County, Nevada, U.S.
- Resting place: Calvary Cemetery (East Los Angeles, California)
- Occupation: Actress
- Years active: 1939–1948
- Spouse: Robert Livingston (m. 1947; div. 1951)
- Children: 1
- Parents: Hal Roach Sr. (father); Marguerite Nichols (mother)
- Relatives: Hal Roach Jr. (brother)

Margaret Mae Roach (March 15, 1921 – November 22, 1964) was an American actress active in the 1930s and 1940s.

== Biography ==
She was born on March 15, 1921, in Los Angeles, California, the daughter of Hal Roach and Marguerite Nichols, and her brother was Hal Roach Jr.

Roach gained early acting experience with a stock theater company headed by Ben Bard. She also sang in a night club and worked for two years as an extra in films before she obtained bigger roles.

Roach was married to the actor Robert Livingston, from 1947 to 1951, and they had one son, actor and writer Addison Randall (b. 1949).

Roach died November 1964 in Washoe County, Nevada from cirrhosis of the liver caused by chronic alcoholism. She was buried in Calvary Cemetery, East Los Angeles, California.

== Filmography ==
- All Women Have Secrets (1939), as Betty
- Fast and Furious (1939), as Emmy Lou
- Riders from Nowhere (1940) as Marian Adams
- Turnabout (1940) as Dixie Gale
- Niagara Falls (1941) as Honeymooner
- Road Show (1941)
- A-Haunting We Will Go (1942)
- Test Tube Babies (1948)
