= Little Boy Lost (1953 film) =

1953 American drama film

- Theatrical release poster
- Directed by: George Seaton
- Screenplay by: George Seaton
- Based on: Little Boy Lost (novel) by Marghanita Laski
- Produced by: William Perlberg
- Starring: Bing Crosby; Claude Dauphin; Christian Fourcade; Nicole Maurey
- Cinematography: George Barnes
- Edited by: Alma Macrorie
- Music by: Victor Young
- Production company: Paramount Pictures
- Distributed by: Paramount Pictures
- Release date: September 3, 1953 (Los Angeles)
- Running time: 95 minutes
- Country: United States
- Language: English
- Box office: $3million (US)

Little Boy Lost is a 1953 American drama film directed by George Seaton and starring Bing Crosby, Claude Dauphin, and Christian Fourcade. Based on the novel Little Boy Lost by Marghanita Laski, the film is about a war correspondent stationed in Paris during World War II and once married to a young Frenchwoman who was murdered by the Nazis. Following the war, he returns to France trying to find his son, whom he lost during a bombing raid but has been told is living in an orphanage in Paris.

Costumes were designed by Edith Head. Makeup was supervised by Wally Westmore.

== Plot ==
During World War II an American war correspondent, Bill Wainwright (played by Crosby), was stationed in Paris. He met and fell in love with a French singer, Lisa Garret (played by Maurey). They married and had a son, Jean.

Wainwright was then assigned to cover the Battle of Dunkirk and after the evacuation of Allied troops and the French surrender he could not return to Paris. He later learned that his wife was murdered by the Nazis for participating in the French Resistance and that his small son went missing during a bombing raid.

This background information is presented via a flashback narrated by Wainwright. The war is now over and the grieving widower has returned to Paris to find his lost little boy. His best friend is Pierre Verdier (played by Dauphin).

Wainwright has been told that his son is living in an orphanage. There, he finds a sad and confused boy, Jean (played by Fourcade), who does bear a resemblance to Lisa, and Wainwright believes he might be his son. The Mother Superior (played by Dorziat) insists that the boy is his, but Wainwright is skeptical and sets out to test him. He begins to form an emotional attachment to the boy, but eventually, when the boy fails the test, Wainwright realizes that the child has been fed information in order to help him pass the test. He confronts the nun, who confesses to having tried to help the boy because of her determination to have her orphans placed in good homes and have happy lives.

Though Wainwright and the boy have formed a bond, he cannot get over his grief until he speaks to a friend who advises him to face up to his wife's death. While out and about, he has seen a stuffed toy identical to one that Wainwright had won at a carnival for Lisa, and which was named "Binky". He buys the toy and has it sent to the orphanage. The movie ends as Wainwright returns to the orphanage, having realized that he needs the boy, even if he may not be the son he lost. Jean, seeing the stuffed dog, hugs it and calls it "Binky", thus revealing that he is Wainwright's son.

== Cast ==
- Bing Crosby as Bill Wainwright
- Claude Dauphin as Pierre Verdier
- Christian Fourcade as Jean (The Little Boy)
- Gabrielle Dorziat as Mother Superior
- Nicole Maurey as Lisa Garret
- Colette Deréal as Nelly
- Georgette Anys as Madame Quilleboeuf
- Henri Letondal as Tracing Service Clerk
- Peter Baldwin as Lt. Walker

== Production ==
Filming took place in Paris in September 1952 and then continued in Hollywood from November to December 1952. Bing Crosby received the news that his wife Dixie Lee was terminally ill while filming in Paris. He returned to California and his wife died on November 1, 1952. Returning to the studio, Crosby had to face a grueling scene, one of the most important in the picture. The war correspondent, who had never in his own heart accepted the fact that his wife was dead, was forced to listen to the official, brutal account of her death, read by her friend. He had to realize that to go on living and to love the living, a man must bury his dead.

== Reception ==
The film had its world premiere at the Beverly Wilshire theatre in Los Angeles on September 3, 1953 and grossed $22,000 in its first week. Its New York premiere was at the Rivoli Theatre as a benefit for the Overseas Press Club on September 21, 1953. The following day Bosley Crowther of The New York Times wrote "here Mr. Crosby is playing a straight dramatic role in a picture of deep emotional content and genuinely tragic, overtones. Except for two or three song numbers that are worked in consistently, there are few other points of contact with the bright and chipper Bingle of old. And yet it must be said for Mr. Crosby that he manages to convey a strong sense of real emotional torment in a tragically wracked character and that he serves as a credible buffer in a candidly heart-socking film."

The reviewer for Variety commented: "Based on the Marghanita Laski story of a father’s search for the young son from whom he had become separated because of the war, the film doesn’t come off with the tremendous heart impact of the original, or of the television version seen only a season or two back, although it does have sufficient moving moments to be satisfactory family filmfare"

Little Boy Lost received the Golden Globe Award for Best Film Promoting International Understanding. It was entered into the 1954 Cannes Film Festival.

== Soundtrack ==
- "Mon Coeur est un violon" (Miarka Laparcerie / Jean Richepin / Auguste Richepin): sung by Nicole Maurey
- "Darktown Strutters' Ball": sung by Bing Crosby and Nicole Maurey
- "A Propos de Rien" (Jimmy Van Heusen / Johnny Burke): sung by Nicole Maurey and again by Bing Crosby
- "Oh! Susanna": sung by boys' group and again by Christian Fourcade.
- "Cela M'est Egal (If It's All the Same to You)" (Jimmy Van Heusen / Johnny Burke): sung by Bing Crosby
- "Sur le Pont d'Avignon": sung by Claude Dauphin and Christian Fourcade
- "Frère Jacques": sung by Bing Crosby, Claude Dauphin and Christian Fourcade
- "The Magic Window” (Jimmy Van Heusen / Johnny Burke): sung by Bing Crosby

Crosby recorded four of the songs for Decca Records and these were issued on a 10" LP titled The Country Girl / Little Boy Lost. Crosby's songs were also included in the Bing's Hollywood series.
