= W. Horace Schmidlapp =

American investment banker and Broadway producer (1916–1987)

- Born: January 29, 1916; Cincinnati, Ohio
- Died: June 27, 1987 (aged 71); Palm Beach, Florida
- Years active: 1940–1946
- Spouses: Carole Landis (m. 1945; died 1948) Patricia Kennedy McClintock (m. 1958)

William Horace Schmidlapp, II (January 29, 1916 – June 27, 1987) was an American investment banker and Broadway producer, and the fourth husband of actress Carole Landis.

He was born in Cincinnati, Ohio, the son of William Horace Schmidlapp, Sr. and Jean Allison Maxwell Schmidlapp. He was the youngest of four brothers. His grandfather, Jacob Godrey Schmidlapp, founded several breweries and earned a fortune that was passed down to his grandchildren. During his youth W. Horace Schmidlapp spent much of his time with his mother and grandmother in France.

Schmidlapp moved to New York City and was involved in the productions of the Broadway plays Boyd's Daughter, Return Engagement, Cabin in the Sky, Count Me In, Polonaise, and South Pacific.

On December 8, 1945 Schmidlapp married actress Carole Landis. They separated in 1947 and Landis filed for divorce in May 1948, charging Schmidlapp with "extreme mental cruelty." At the time of Landis’ July 5, 1948 death, Schmidlapp conceded that the divorce action was "continuing" but claimed that no divorce papers had been served upon him, and that he and his wife had spent Christmas together in France.

In 1958 Schmidlapp married Patricia Kennedy McClintock in Palm Beach, Florida and adopted her daughter Victoria. He resided in Palm Beach until his death on June 27, 1987.
