= Neville Laski =

English judge and leader of Anglo-Jewry

Neville Jonas Laski QC (18 December 1890 – 24 March 1969) was an English judge and leader of Anglo-Jewry.

== Family ==
Laski's father was Nathan Laski (1863-1941), a Lithuanian Jewish Manchester cotton merchant and a leader of British Jewry; his mother, Sarah Frankenstein, had married Nathan Laski in 1889. His younger brother was Harold Laski.

He married Phina Emily, eldest daughter of Moses Gaster. They had four children, including Marghanita Laski.

== Education ==
- Manchester Grammar School
- Clifton College
- Corpus Christi College, Oxford, MA Beit Prize, 1912.

== Career ==
Laski was a barrister and was appointed a King's Counsel (KC) in 1930 and a Bencher of the Inner Temple in 1938. He was a Judge of Appeal of the Isle of Man, 1953–1956 and Recorder of Burnley, 1935–1956. He was a Judge of the Crown Court and Recorder of Liverpool (1956–1963).

During the First World War he served with the 6th Lancashire Fusiliers in Gallipoli, Sinai and France, retiring with the rank of Captain.

He was a member of the General Council of the Bar, 1950–1956, Chairman of its Professional Conduct Committee, 1952–1956 and its Honorary Treasurer, 1955–1956.

== Other positions held ==
- Chairman, Manchester Victoria Memorial Jewish Hospital
- President, Board of Deputies of British Jews, 1933–1939
- Presiding elder of the Spanish and Portuguese Jews Congregation, 1961–1967
- Vice-president, Anglo-Jewish Association

== See also ==
- Who Was Who
- Sagar v Ridehalgh & Sons Ltd [1931] 1 Ch 310, a UK labour law case where Laski KC represented the employer.

== Publications ==
- The Laws and Charities of the Spanish and Portuguese Jews' Congregation of London (1663-1677)
- Jewish Rights and Jewish Wrongs
