= Road Show (film) =

1941 film by Hal Roach

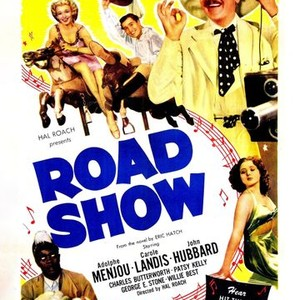
- Theatrical poster
- Directed by: Hal Roach
- Written by: Arnold Belgard; Harry Langdon; Mickell Novack
- Based on: Road Show by Eric S. Hatch
- Produced by: Hal Roach
- Starring: Adolphe Menjou; Carole Landis; John Hubbard
- Cinematography: Norbert Brodine
- Edited by: Bert Jordan
- Music by: George Stoll
- Production company: Hal Roach Studios
- Distributed by: United Artists
- Release date: February 18, 1941
- Running time: 87 minutes
- Country: United States
- Language: English
- Budget: $500,000
- Box office: $284,394

Road Show is a 1941 American comedy film directed by Hal Roach and starring Adolphe Menjou, Carole Landis and John Hubbard. Based on the 1934 novel of the same title by Eric S. Hatch. The film was distributed by United Artists.

== Plot ==
Fabulously wealthy young Drogo Gaines is about to marry his fiancée Helen Newton. Coming down with cold feet, he fakes a nervous breakdown as the service begins. Taken to a private room, he then overhears golddigging Helen and her equally greedy brother revealing that she is after his money. Helen is furious and loudly feigns a violent attack by Drogo. Before he can explain his entrapment to witnesses, he is knocked out. When he wakes up, he is in a mental institution.

At the sanitarium Drogo meets wealthy eccentric Colonel Carleton Carraway. Carraway has admitted himself to get away from annoying relatives. Nonetheless, Carraway helps Drogo escape, and they are picked up by beautiful young maverick carnival operator Penguin Moore.

When Penguin is pressed by a local sheriff for skipping town on some bills, Drago bails her out with his last cash. She does not know it is, or anything about his background, which he determinedly hides from everyone. Now broke, Drogo and Carraway raise some fast money conning some rubes. They are arrested, but escape and are helped by Penguin, who gives them jobs as roustabouts.

They are spotted by Stanhope, Drogo's personal secretary, who hangs about on the periphery. Drogo falls in love with Penguin, the first woman he has met who does not want him for his fortune. In spite of everyone's efforts, the carnival keeps losing money.

Drogo secretly sends Stanhope to buy the best carnival in America, lock, stock, and barrel. Rewarding him for his hard work, and attracted to him, Penguin promotes Drogo into the role of her partner in an acrobatic act. He fails badly at it, and is hooted off the stage by the audience. Drogo gets support from his pal Carraway, who convinces Penguin Drogo was once the greatest lion tamer ever. The daughter of one, Penguin acquires the cats of another carnival so Drogo can be featured in a headline act. A providential rain storm saves him from embarrassment his first night.

Fortuitously, the carnival sets up at the estate of Carraway's millionaire nephew Harry Whitman. Harry's wealthy friends flock to the attraction, but a commotion arises when a lion follows Drogo out of the enclosure during a performance. A donnybrook then starts when a spurned local lout, offended earlier when told the carnival was hosting a private party, returns with his gang of ruffians. The riot destroys the entire carnival. Harry pledges to reimburse Penguin for the damage.

Calloway slyly ensures that what is left of the carnival is stored in a barn that Harry "burns down" every Friday for the entertainment of his guests and a chance for him to play fire chief. Out come several of Harry’s personal fire engines, and everyone jumps on board. But instead of putting out the fire, they race to the next town over where the carnival that Drogo had purchased is dazzlingly set up. Emblazoned over its entrance are the names Moore & Gaines. The couple seal their partnership, and future marriage, with a kiss.

== Cast ==
- Adolphe Menjou as Colonel Carleton Carroway
- Carole Landis as Penguin Moore
- John Hubbard as Drogo Gaines
- Charles Butterworth as Harry Whitman
- Patsy Kelly as Jinx
- Shemp Howard as Moe
- George E. Stone as Indian
- Margaret Roach as Priscilla
- Polly Ann Young as Helen Newton
- Edward Norris as Ed Newton
- Marjorie Woodworth as Alice
- Florence Bates as Mrs. Newton
- Willie Best as Willie
- The Charioteers

== Soundtrack ==
- The Charioteers - "I Should Have Known You Years Ago" (Written by Hoagy Carmichael, lyrics by Harris Robison)
- Carole Landis (dubbed by Martha Mears) - "I Should Have Known You Years Ago" (Written by Hoagy Carmichael, lyrics by Harris Robison)
- The Charioteers - "Calliope Jane" (Written by Hoagy Carmichael)
- The Charioteers - "Yum Yum" (Written by Hoagy Carmichael)
