= Carole Landis =

American actress (1919–1948)

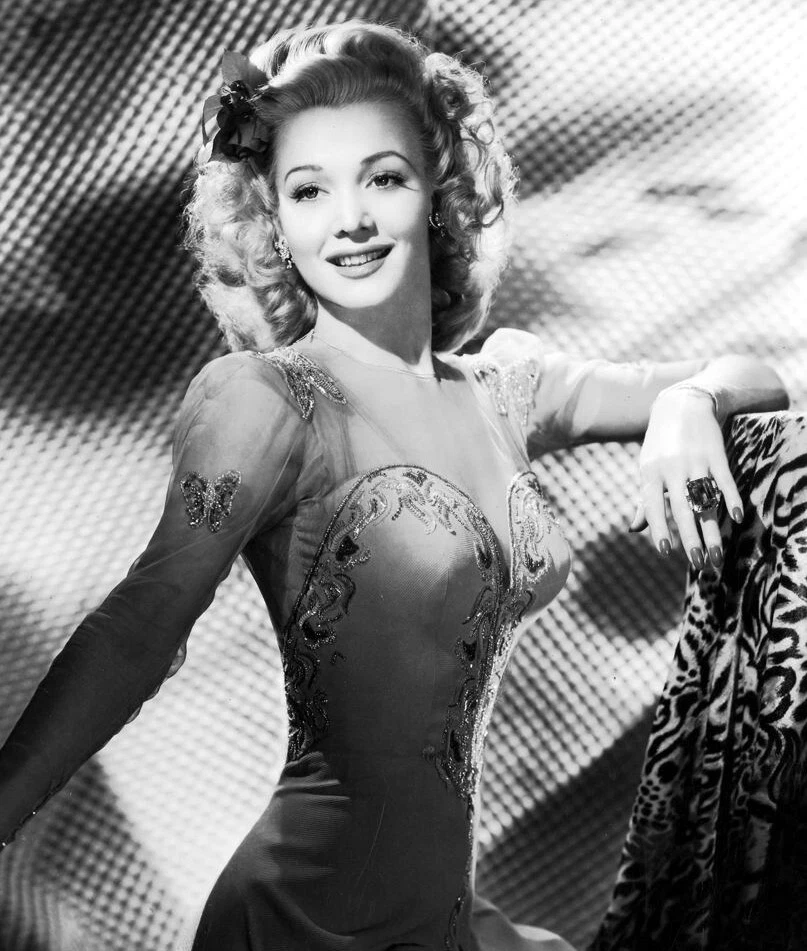
- Carole Landis in 1944
- Born: Frances Lillian Mary Ridste; January 1, 1919; Fairchild, Wisconsin, U.S.
- Died: July 5, 1948 (aged 29); Pacific Palisades, Los Angeles, California, U.S.
- Burial place: Forest Lawn Memorial Park
- Occupation: Actress
- Years active: 1934–1948
- Spouses: Irving Wheeler (m. 1934; ann. 1934) Irving Wheeler (m. 1934; div. 1939) Willis Hunt Jr. (m. 1940; div. 1940) Thomas C. Wallace (m. 1943; div. 1945) W. Horace Schmidlapp (m. 1945–1948)

Carole Landis (born Frances Lillian Mary Ridste; January 1, 1919 – July 5, 1948) was an American actress. She worked as a contract player for 20th Century Fox in the 1940s. Her breakout role was as the female lead in the 1940 film One Million B.C. from United Artists. She was known as "The Ping Girl", a nickname given to her by Frank Seltzer that she disliked and tried to disassociate herself from.

== Early life ==
Landis was born on January 1, 1919, in Fairchild, Wisconsin, the youngest of five children of Clara (née Sentek), a Polish farmer's daughter, and Norwegian-American Alfred Ridste, a drifting railroad mechanic who abandoned the family after Landis's birth. According to Landis's biographer E. J. Fleming, circumstantial evidence supports that Landis was likely the biological child of her mother's second husband, Charles Fenner. Fenner left Landis's mother in April 1921 and remarried a few months later.

In 1923, Landis's family moved to San Bernardino, California, where her mother worked menial jobs to support the family. At the age of 15, Landis dropped out of San Bernardino High School and set forth on a career path to show business. She started out as a hula dancer in a San Francisco nightclub, where she was described by her boss as a "nervous $35-a-week blonde doing a pathetic hula at her opening night at the old Royal Hawaiian on Bush [Street]...that'll never get her anyplace in show business". He apparently employed her only because he felt sorry for her; she later sang with a dance band.

After saving $100, she moved to Hollywood in 1937. She bleached her hair blonde and adopted the screen name of "Carole Landis" in honor of her favorite actress, Carole Lombard, and baseball commissioner Kenesaw Mountain Landis. She would legally change her name to Carole Landis on April 23, 1942.

== Career ==
=== Film career ===
She was signed by Warner Bros. in late 1936 and went on to appear in two dozen features, mostly for Bryan Foy's low-budget "B" unit (including gradually increasing roles in four Torchy Blane comedies, some of which gave her screen credit). By 1938 she was working in the studio's major motion pictures like The Adventures of Robin Hood and Boy Meets Girl, but only in uncredited bits.

Dissatisfied with her lack of progress, she moved on to Republic Pictures, a small but efficient studio specializing in action pictures. The smaller studio paid more attention to her, giving her ingenue leads in two Three Mesquiteers westerns and a serial, Daredevils of the Red Circle.

Pioneer producer Hal Roach was preparing One Million B.C., a dramatic film about prehistoric people menaced by the elements. He hired another movie pioneer, D. W. Griffith, to cast the picture. It was to be a rugged shoot, with many scenes staged outdoors. Roach recalled:

We had already decided on Victor Mature as the man and Lon Chaney [Jr.] as the father. They brought in girls. [Griffith] looked at them. Every time these girls came in, he took them to the back lot. I didn't know what the hell he was doing in the open spaces. Then one day he said, "I found your girl." It was Carole Landis. We went out on the back lot where there was street scenery and, on the corner, a telephone post. He looked at the girl and said, "Take your shoes off. Now run to that post as fast as you can. Then run back to me as fast as you can." She did. I wasn't particularly impressed. That's a hell of a way to pick our leading lady. He said, "I've had 50 girls run to that post and back. She's the only one who knows how to run. You're not going to make a believable girl in a picture of that kind who runs like an average girl. She's got to run like an athlete, a deer." And she could. Her rhythm was really beautiful. In the picture you never noticed it. But if she ran like most girls, you would damn well have seen the difference.

Hal Roach saw star potential in Carole Landis and signed her to a contract in June 1940. He continued casting her in three more starring roles, the best known being Turnabout (1940), a role-reversal farce written by Thorne Smith and co-starring John Hubbard.

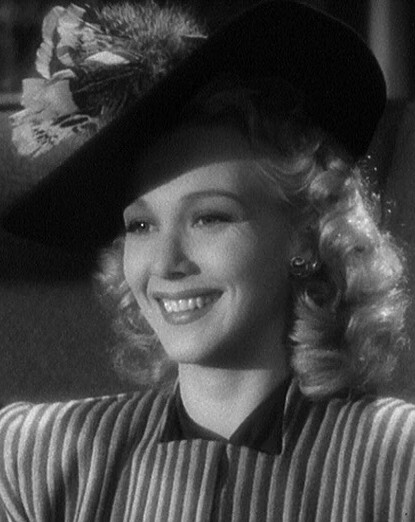
Carole Landis in Topper Returns, 1941

She returned to Republic for one more film, the Judy Canova comedy Sis Hopkins (1941). She then landed a contract with Twentieth Century-Fox and began a sexual relationship with studio chief Darryl F. Zanuck. She had roles playing opposite fellow pin-up girl Betty Grable in the musical Moon Over Miami and the crime drama I Wake Up Screaming, both in 1941. When Landis ended her relationship with Zanuck, he stopped furthering her career. She remained under contract but was now assigned to lesser pictures, and Fox loaned her out to other studios three times. Her final two films, Noose and Brass Monkey, were both made in Great Britain.

On March 20, 1943, the Fashion Academy had named Landis the best-dressed woman for 1943 in its screen classification category. The Fashion Academy honor was based on an annual poll of leading designers to select the twelve best dressed women of the nation for twelve different classification categories.

=== USO tours ===
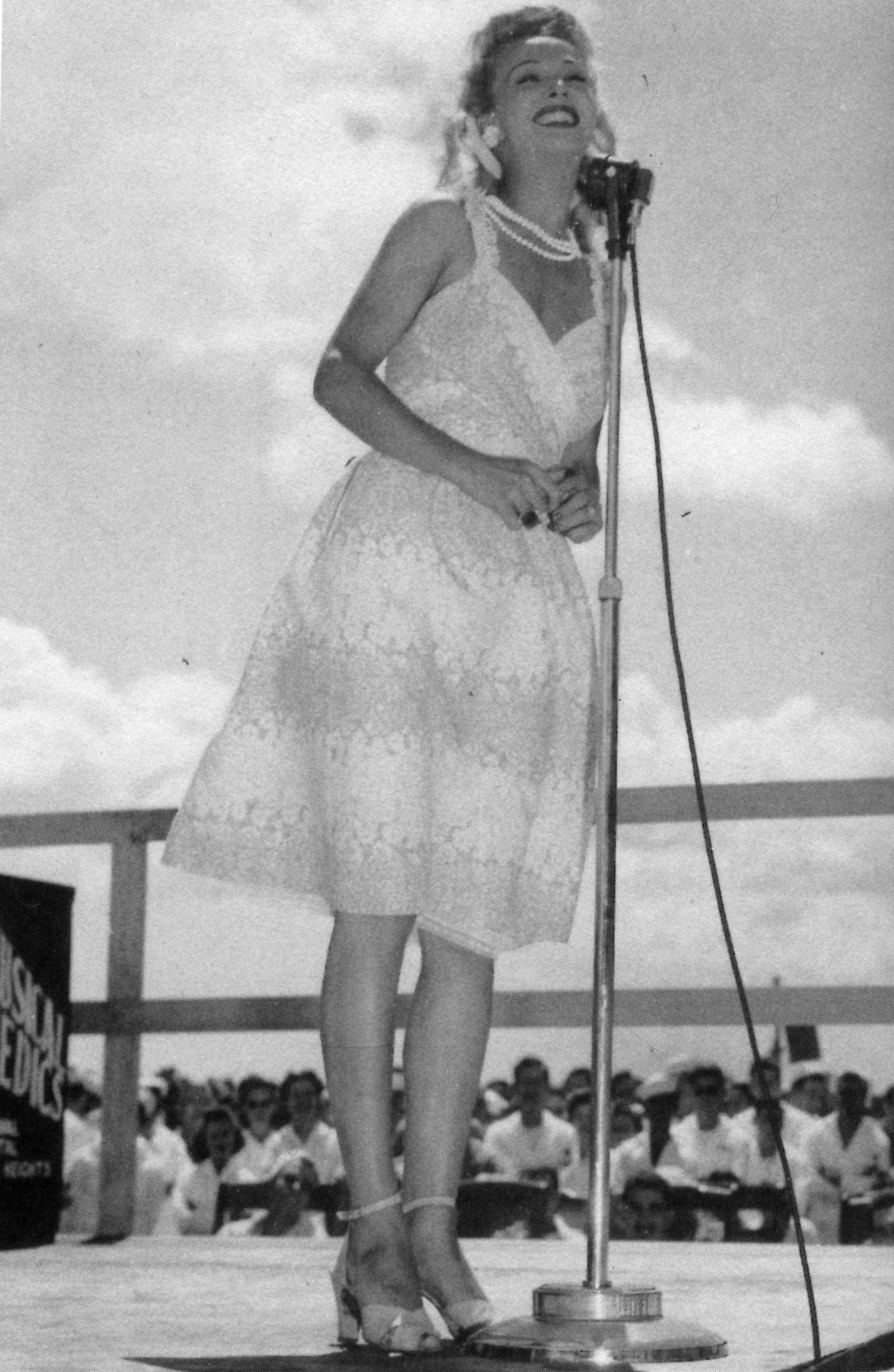
Carole Landis performing in a USO show at the U.S. Naval Hospital in Aiela Heights, Oahu on June 20, 1945.

Carole Landis became a popular pin-up with servicemen during World War II. In 1942, she traveled with comedian Martha Raye, dancer Mitzi Mayfair, and actress Kay Francis, serving for the USO in England and North Africa. Two years later, she entertained soldiers in the South Pacific alongside Jack Benny. During the war, Landis traveled over 100,000 miles and was the actress who spent the most time engaged in this activity. During her travels, she became seriously ill due to amoebic dysentery and malaria.

=== Broadway ===
In 1945 she starred on Broadway in the musical A Lady Says Yes, with future novelist Jacqueline Susann in a small role. Susann is said to have based the character of Jennifer North, from her best-selling novel Valley of the Dolls, in part on Landis.

=== Writing ===
Landis wrote several newspaper and magazine articles about her experiences during the war, including the 1944 book Four Jills in a Jeep, which was later made into a movie costarring Kay Francis, Martha Raye, and Mitzi Mayfair. She also wrote the foreword to Vic Herman's cartoon book Winnie the WAC.

== Personal life ==
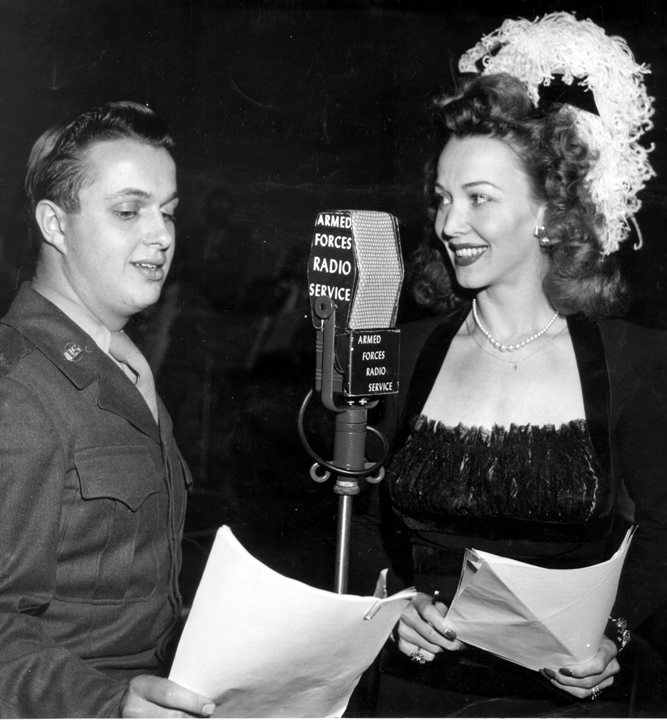
Sgt. Bill Stewart and Landis ca. 1940s

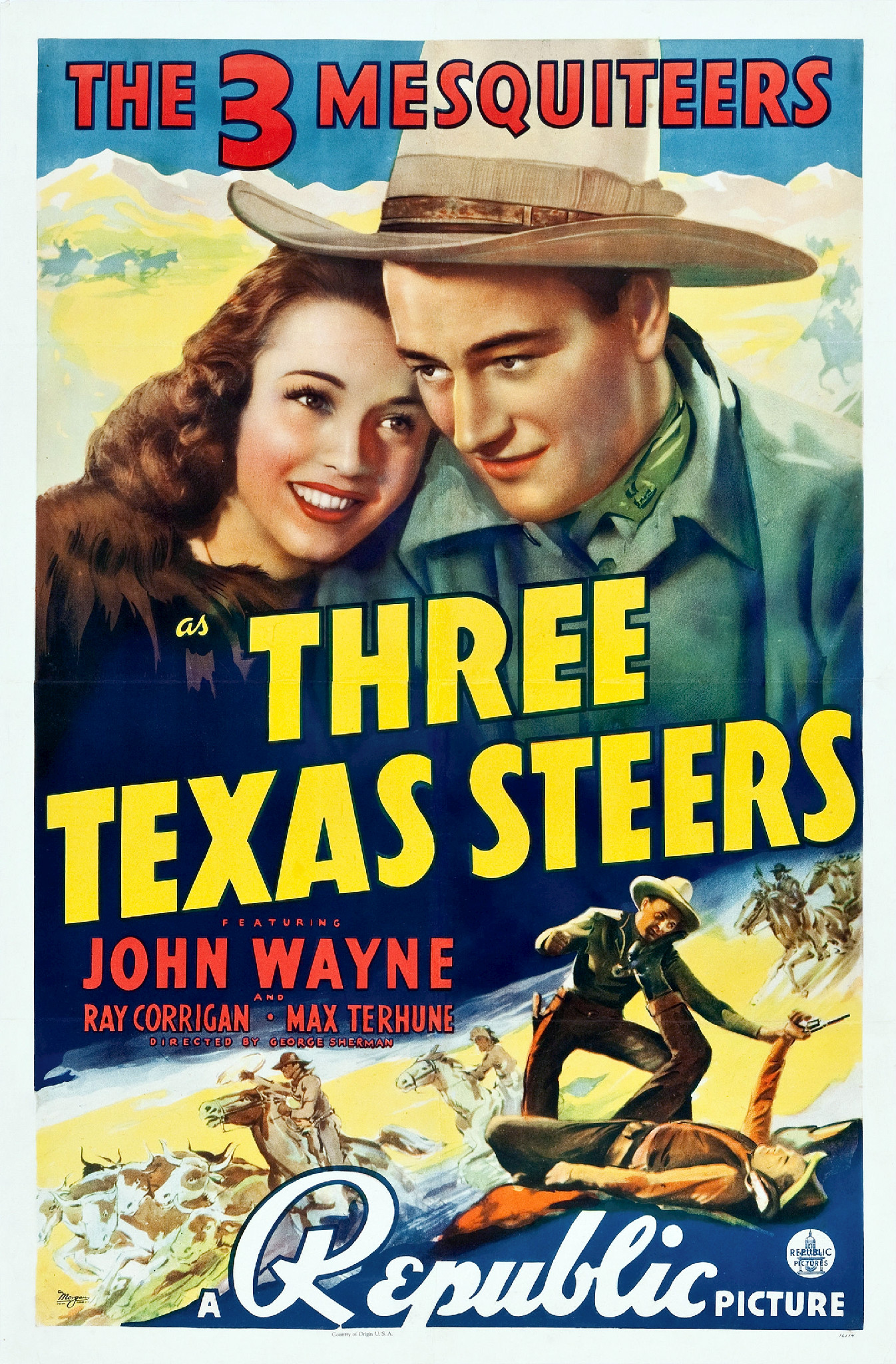
Landis and John Wayne, 1939

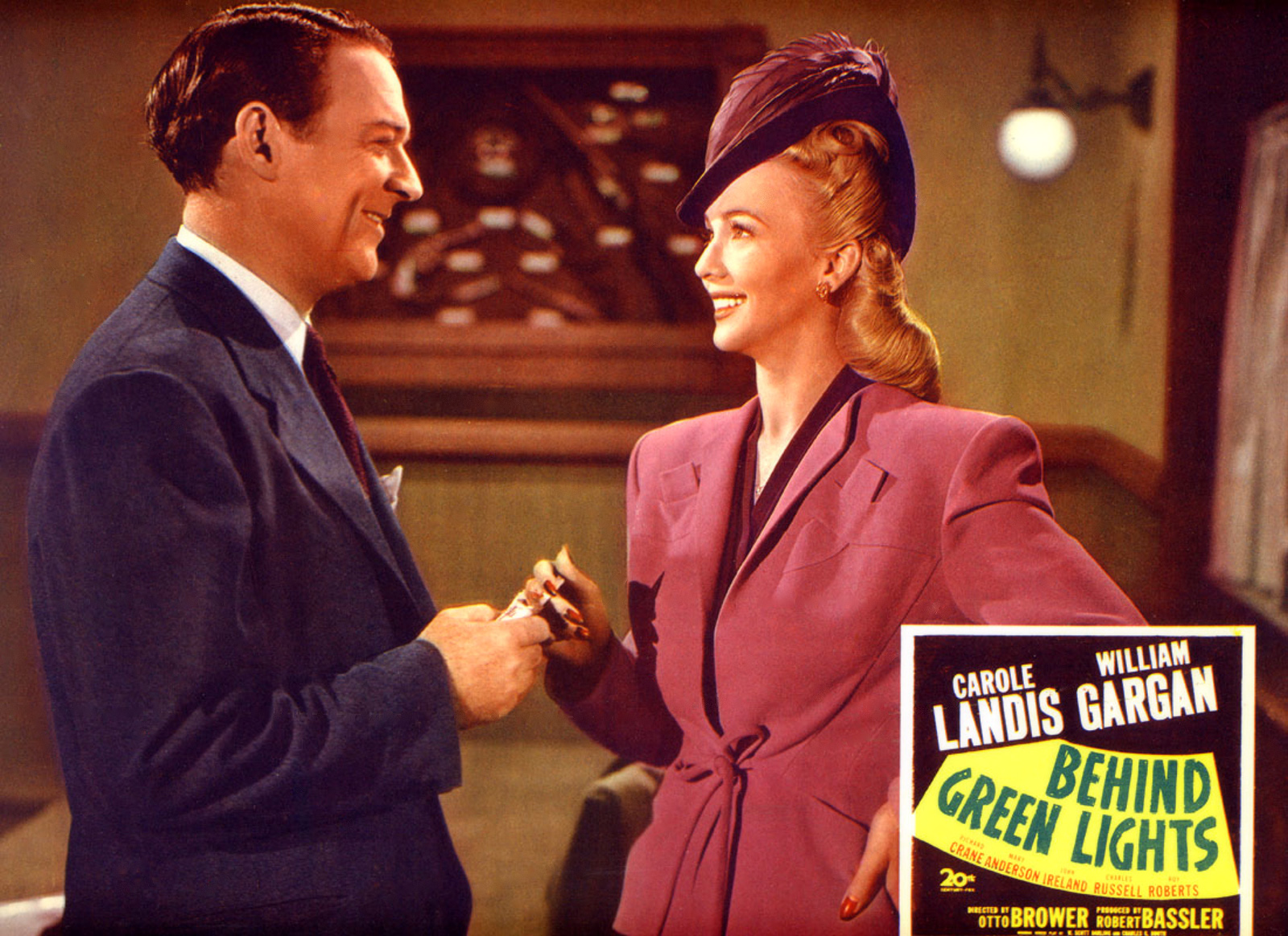
William Gargan and Landis, 1946)

Landis was married four times and had no children (she was unable to conceive owing to endometriosis). In January 1934, 15-year-old Landis married her first husband, 19-year-old Irving Wheeler. Her mother had the marriage annulled in February 1934. Landis persuaded her father, Alfred Ridste (who had left the family shortly after Landis was born and who, by coincidence, lived near the family in San Bernardino), to allow her to remarry Wheeler. He finally relented, and the two were remarried on August 25, 1934. After three weeks of marriage, Landis and Wheeler got into an argument, and Landis walked out. Neither filed for divorce, and Landis began pursuing an acting career. In 1938, Wheeler reappeared and filed a $250,000 alienation of affections lawsuit against director and choreographer Busby Berkeley. Even though Landis and Wheeler were estranged, he claimed that Berkeley had enticed and otherwise persuaded Landis to transfer her affections. Landis maintained that she had not seen Wheeler in years and had heard from him only the previous year when he claimed to want a divorce. Wheeler's lawsuit was later dismissed, and Landis and Wheeler were divorced in 1939.

In June 1939 Berkeley proposed to Landis but later broke it off. On July 4, 1940, she married yacht broker Willis Hunt Jr. in Las Vegas. Landis left Hunt after two months of marriage due to abuse by Hunt; they were divorced on November 20, 1940.

While touring army camps in London in 1942, she met United States Army Air Forces Captain Thomas Wallace. They were married in January 1943, and the wedding received a two-page photo spread in Life magazine. Landis would also write an article about their honeymoon for the June 1943 edition of Photoplay. The couple separated in early 1945, and they would divorce in July 1945. Landis would write about the relationship, marriage, and later causes that led to the eventual collapse of their marriage in her article "Don't Marry A Stranger" for the January 1945 issue of Photoplay. She would state that "No woman ever loved a man more than I loved Tommy Wallace. And Tommy loved me, too. All my life, above all the rest, I want to remember that."

On December 8, 1945, Landis married Broadway producer W. Horace Schmidlapp. They separated in 1947, and Landis filed for divorce in May 1948, charging Schmidlapp with "extreme mental cruelty." During her separation from Schmidlapp, Landis began a relationship with actor Rex Harrison, who was then married to actress Lilli Palmer. The affair became widely known in Hollywood as an "open secret." After Landis's death, however, Harrison downplayed their relationship and publicly claimed that she was merely a close friend of himself and Palmer.

== Death and funeral ==
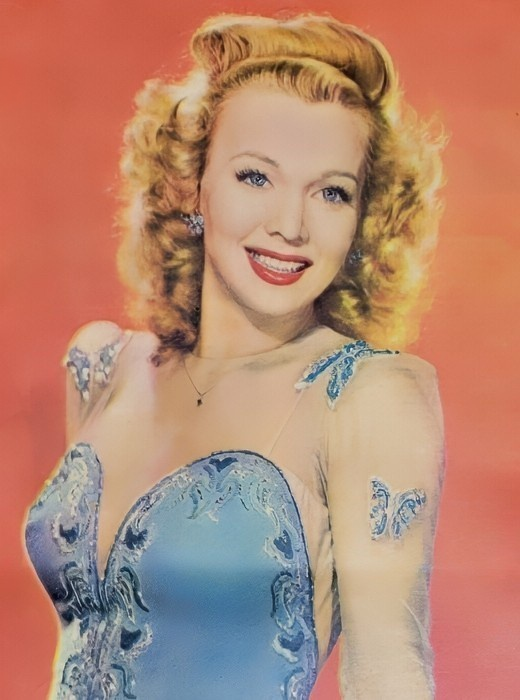
The blue beaded butterfly dress that Carole Landis would be interred in on July 10, 1948

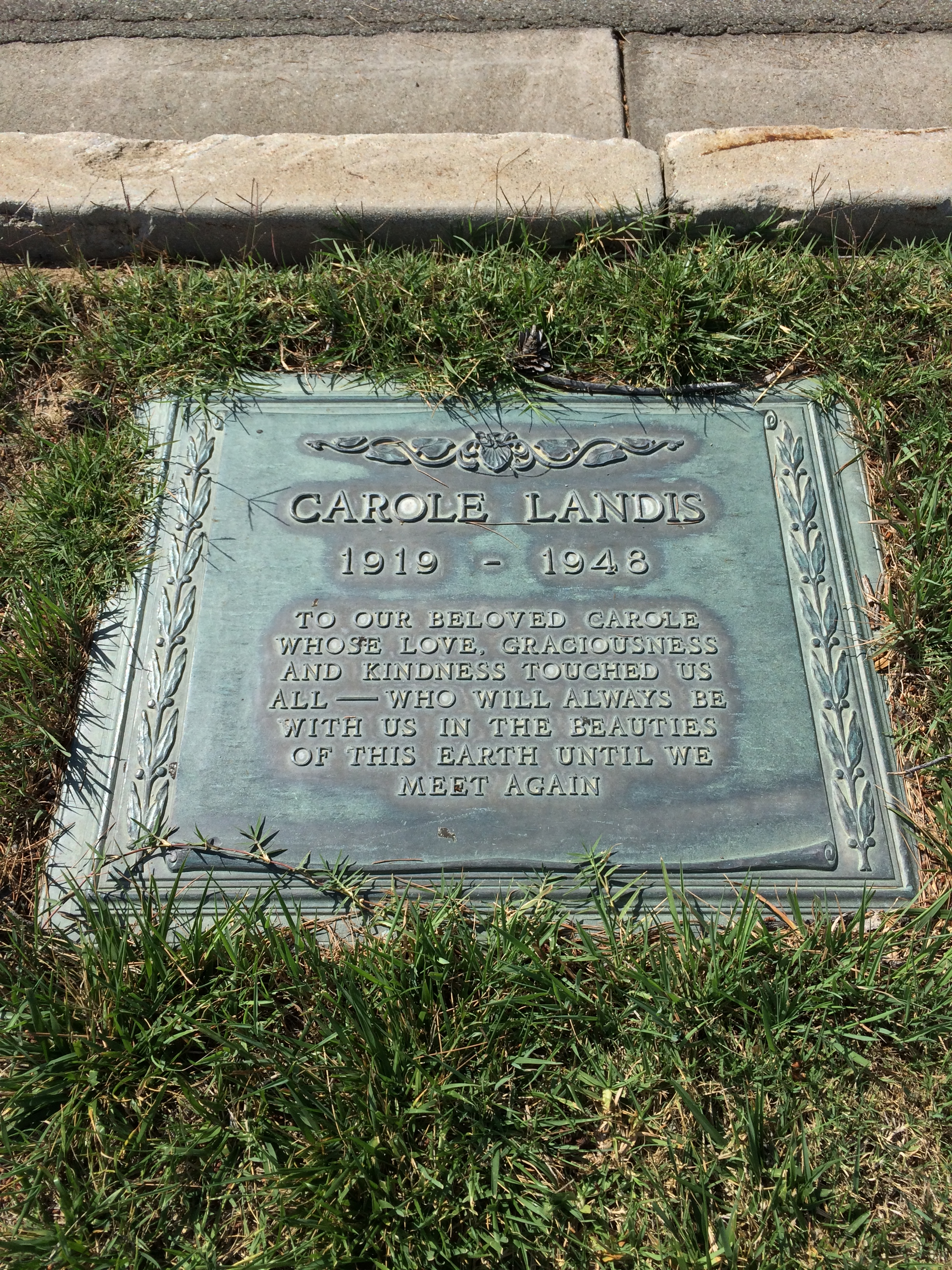
Grave of Carole Landis at Forest Lawn in Glendale, California

Landis was reportedly devastated when Harrison refused to divorce his wife to be with her. On July 5, 1948, unable to cope any longer, she died by suicide at her Pacific Palisades home at 1465 Capri Drive by taking an overdose of Seconal. Before she took her life, she penned a note to her mother, expressing remorse for the pain her actions would cause. She assured her mother and family members of her love and asked her to find her will, which left everything to her mother. Landis signed off as “Your Baby” and requested her mother’s prayers. Harrison was the last person to see her alive, having had dinner with her the night before she committed suicide.

The next afternoon, Harrison and Landis's maid discovered her on the bathroom floor. Harrison waited several hours before he called a doctor and the police. According to some sources, Landis left two suicide notes, one for her mother and the second for Harrison, who instructed his lawyers to destroy it. During a coroner's inquest, Harrison denied knowing any motive for her suicide and told the coroner he did not know of the existence of a second suicide note. Landis's official website, which her family owns, has questioned the events of Landis's death and the coroner's ruling of suicide.

On July 10, 1948 at 12:30 PM her service was held at Forest Lawn's Church of the Recessional by Bishop Fred L. Pyman. During her service Pyman sang her favorite hymn, "In the Garden". Afterwards she was interred in Forest Lawn Memorial Park Cemetery in Glendale, California, in plot 814 of the "Everlasting Love" section. Among the celebrities at her service and funeral were Cesar Romero, Eddie Sutherland, Van Johnson, and Pat O'Brien. W. Horace Schmidlapp, her estranged husband, also attended her service and funeral. Rex Harrison attended with his wife; however, they both left early and had refused to look at Landis in her coffin during viewing.

== Legacy ==
Landis has a star on the Hollywood Walk of Fame at 1765 Vine Street which was dedicated to her on February 8, 1960.

On October 4, 2019 Landis was honored with a 28 inch bronze statue that is housed in Fairchild Public Library in her hometown of Fairchild, Wisconsin. The Carole Landis Fan Club donated the statue, as well as memorabilia related to the actress.

Carole Landis Hollywood Walk of Fame Star

== Filmography ==
Year	Title	Role	Notes
1937	The King and the Chorus Girl	Chorine	Uncredited
1937	A Star Is Born	Girl in beret at Santa Anita bar	Uncredited
1937	A Day at the Races	Dance Extra	
1937	Fly-Away Baby	Blonde at airport	Torchy Blane comedy
1937	The Emperor's Candlesticks	Bit part	
1937	Broadway Melody of 1938	Dancer	
1937	Varsity Show	Student	
1937	Alcatraz Island		Uncredited
1937	Over the Goal	Co-ed	Uncredited
1937	The Adventurous Blonde	Uncredited	Torchy Blane comedy
1937	Hollywood Hotel	Hat check girl with coat	
1938	The Invisible Menace	Woman waiting to go with her Johnnie	
1938	Blondes at Work	Carole	Torchy Blane comedy
1938	A Slight Case of Murder	Partygoer leaning on piano during song	
1938	Love, Honor and Behave	Wheel watcher at party	Uncredited
1938	Over the Wall	Peggy, girl at beach	Uncredited
1938	Torchy Blane in Panama	Miss Leopard of 1938	Torchy Blane comedy
1938	Women Are Like That	Cocktail party guest	Uncredited
1938	The Adventures of Robin Hood	Guest at banquet	Uncredited
1938	Gold Diggers in Paris	Golddigger	Alternative title: The Gay Impostors
1938	Men Are Such Fools	June Cooper	Uncredited
1938	When Were You Born	Ship passenger	Uncredited
1938	Penrod's Double Trouble	Girl at fair	Uncredited
1938	Four's a Crowd	Myrtle, Lansford's 2nd Secretary	
1938	Boy Meets Girl	Commissary cashier	Uncredited
1939	Three Texas Steers	Nancy Evans	Alternative title: Danger Rides the Range
1939	Daredevils of the Red Circle	Blanche Granville	
1939	Cowboys from Texas	June Jones	
1939	Reno	Mrs. Humphrey	Uncredited
1940	One Million B.C.	Loana	
1940	Turnabout	Sally Willows	
1940	Mystery Sea Raider	June McCarthy	
1941	Road Show	Penguin Moore	
1941	Topper Returns	Ann Carrington	
1941	Moon Over Miami	Barbara Latimer, aka Miss Sears	
1941	Dance Hall	Lily Brown	
1941	I Wake Up Screaming	Vicky Lynn	Alternative title: Hot Spot
1941	Cadet Girl	Gene Baxter	
1942	A Gentleman at Heart	Helen Mason	
1942	My Gal Sal	Mae Collins	
1942	It Happened in Flatbush	Kathryn Baker	
1942	Orchestra Wives	Natalie Mercer	
1942	Manila Calling	Edna Fraser	
1943	The Powers Girl	Kay Evans	
1943	Wintertime	Flossie Fouchere	
1943	Show Business at War	Herself	
1944	Secret Command	Jill McGann	
1944	Four Jills in a Jeep	Herself	
1945	Having Wonderful Crime	Helene Justus	
1946	Behind Green Lights	Janet Bradley	
1946	A Scandal in Paris	Loretta de Richet	Alternative title: Thieves' Holiday
1946	It Shouldn't Happen to a Dog	Julia Andrews	
1947	Out of the Blue	Mae Earthleigh	
1948	Noose	Linda Medbury	Alternative title: The Silk Noose; released posthumously.
1948	Brass Monkey	Kay Sheldon	Alternative title: Lucky Mascot; released posthumously (final role)

== Radio Appearances ==
Date	Program	Episode/Program/Source
04/24/1938	Warner Brothers Academy Theater	Special Agent / Carol' Radio Debut
06/11/1942	Command Performance	Program #17
05/10/1943	The Front Line Theater	Johnny Eager
10/23/1943	Command Performance	Program #90
11/25/1943	Soldiers In Greasepaint	Thanksgiving Salute to U.S.O.
12/11/1943	Command Performance	Program #96
04/11/1944	Duffy's Tavern	Program #47
04/11/1944	Duffy's Tavern	Program #125 (Rebroadcast of #47 for AFRS)
04/21/1944	GI Journal	Episode #42
06/24/1944	Command Performance	Program #126
02/14/1946	Command Performance	Program #211
03/16/1946	Continental Celebrity Club	Episode #15

== Theater ==
Performance Date	Theater Genre	Play	Character
01/10/1945 - 03/25/1945	Broadway	A Lady Says Yes	Ghisella

== Recordings ==
Recording Date	Format	Recording Title
07/02/1948	Record	Party Games
