= Riders from Nowhere =

- Theatrical release poster
- Directed by: Raymond K. Johnson
- Screenplay by: Carl Krusada
- Story by: Richard D. Pearsall
- Produced by: Harry S. Webb
- Starring: Jack Randall; Margaret Roach; Ernie Adams; Tom London; Charles King; Nelson McDowell
- Cinematography: Edward A. Kull; William Hyer
- Edited by: Robert Golden
- Production company: Monogram Pictures
- Distributed by: Monogram Pictures
- Release date: December 30, 1940
- Running time: 47 minutes
- Country: United States
- Language: English

Riders from Nowhere is a 1940 American Western film directed by Raymond K. Johnson and written by Carl Krusada. The film stars Jack Randall, Margaret Roach, Ernie Adams, Tom London, Charles King and Nelson McDowell. The film was released on December 30, 1940, by Monogram Pictures.

== Plot ==
Assuming the identity of a Ranger he finds dying on the trail, Jack Rankin, aided by his sidekick Manny, begins to clean up the lawless town of Brimstone, which is being preyed upon by outlaws robbing the nearby gold mines of the bullion shipments, secretly led by Frank Mason and his chief henchman Trigger. He is uncovered by the arrival of the dead man's sister, Marian Adams and is accused of killing the Ranger.

== Cast ==
- Jack Randall as Jack Rankin
- Margaret Roach as Marian Adams
- Ernie Adams as Manny
- Tom London as Mason
- Charles King as Trigger
- Nelson McDowell as Undertaker
- George Chesebro as Bart
- Dorothy Vernon as Mrs. Gregory
