= Turnabout (film) =

1940 film by Hal Roach

- main title
- Directed by: Hal Roach
- Screenplay by: Mickell Novack; Berne Giler; John McClain; Add'l dialogue: Rian James
- Based on: Turnabout (1931 novel) by Thorne Smith
- Produced by: Hal Roach
- Starring: Adolphe Menjou; Carole Landis; John Hubbard
- Cinematography: Norbert Brodine
- Edited by: Bert Jordan
- Music by: Arthur Morton
- Production company: Hal Roach Studios
- Distributed by: United Artists
- Release date: May 17, 1940
- Running time: 83 minutes
- Country: United States
- Language: English

Turnabout is a 1940 fantasy comedy film directed by Hal Roach and starring Adolphe Menjou, Carole Landis and John Hubbard. Based on the 1931 novel, Turnabout, by Thorne Smith, the screenplay was written by Mickell Novack, Bernie Giler and John McClain with additional dialogue by Rian James. In 1979, the screenplay was adapted for the short-lived television series with the same name.

== Plot ==
Tim and Sally Willows (John Hubbard and Carole Landis) are a spoiled well-off couple who constantly bicker and cannot agree on anything.

Tim Willows is considered to be the main cog in the machinery of his own advertising company Manning, Willows, and Clare. His wife Sally is his exact opposite, pampering herself in their home all day. And when Tim gets home, they start arguing, constantly watched by a strange Indian idol they got from a distant relative of Tim. They call it Mr. Ram.

After one extraordinarily stressful day at the office, Tim comes home to find Sally in the bath, and they start arguing like never before. In the heat of the moment, Tim expresses a wish to switch places with his lazy wife, to see how she goes about her days at nearly half speed. Sally also makes the same wish, seriously doubting the strain of running the advertising firm, having fun all day long. The Indian idol on the wall overhears their respective wishes and makes them come true, speaking loudly from its place on the wall.

When the couple wake up the next morning they have indeed switched places and bodies with each other. Chaos ensues, as active Tim stays home with the servants and wives of his colleagues all day, in Sally's body, while she goes to work and manages to be rude to the firm's biggest client. Sally also succeeds in landing another client that Tim had denied business before.

When the couple finally meet again in their home at night, they both beg on their bare knees to switch back into their regular bodies again. Their wish is granted this time too, and life goes back to normal. Tim has to clean up the mess Sally made at the firm, and she apologizes to all their friends. They blame everything on the fact that Sally is pregnant.

When everything seems to be just fine again, Mr. Ram explains that he made a mistake when changing them back into their ordinary bodies, and as it now happens, Tim is the one who is pregnant.

== Cast ==
- Adolphe Menjou as Phil Manning
- Carole Landis as Sally Willows
- John Hubbard as Tim Willows
- William Gargan as Joel Clare
- Verree Teasdale as Laura Bannister
- Mary Astor as Marion Manning
- Donald Meek as Henry – the Valet
- Joyce Compton as Irene Clare
- Inez Courtney as Miss Edwards
- Franklin Pangborn as Mr. Alan Pingboom
- Marjorie Main as Nora – the Cook
- Berton Churchill as Julian Marlowe
- Margaret Roach as Dixie Gale
- Ray Turner as Mose
- Norman Budd as Jimmy
- Polly Ann Young as Miss Gertie Twill
- Eleanor Riley as Lorraine
- Murray Alper as Doc – the Masseur
- Miki Morita as Ito
- Yolande Donlan as Marie – the Maid
- Georges Renavent as Mr. Ram
