= Marghanita Laski =

English journalist and novelist (1915–1988)

- Marghanita Laski, date unknown
- Born: 24 October 1915; Manchester, England
- Died: 6 February 1988 (aged 72); Royal Brompton Hospital, London, England
- Education: Somerville College, Oxford
- Occupations: Journalist, radio panellist and novelist
- Notable work: Little Boy Lost (1949); The Victorian Chaise-longue (1953)
- Relatives: Neville Laski (father); Moses Gaster (grandfather); Harold Laski (uncle)

Marghanita Laski (24 October 1915 – 6 February 1988) was an English journalist, radio panellist and novelist. She also wrote literary biography, plays and short stories, and contributed about 250,000 additions to the Oxford English Dictionary.

== Personal life ==
Marghanita Laski was born in Manchester, England, to a prominent family of Jewish intellectuals (Neville Laski was her father, Moses Gaster her grandfather, and Harold Laski her uncle). She was educated at Lady Barn House School in Manchester and St Paul's Girls' School in Hammersmith, worked in fashion, then studied English at Somerville College, Oxford, where she was a close friend of Inez Pearn, who was later to become a novelist and marry Stephen Spender and subsequently, after a divorce, Charles Madge.

While she was at Oxford she met John Eldred Howard, founder of the Cresset Press; they married in 1937. During this time she worked as a journalist.

Laski lived at Capo Di Monte in Judge's Walk, Hampstead, North London, and in the Hertfordshire village of Abbots Langley.

== Career ==
Laski began writing in earnest after her son and daughter were born. Most of her output in the 1940s and 1950s was fiction. She wrote the original screenplay of the 1952 UK film It Started in Paradise and sold the film rights to Little Boy Lost (1949), her novel about an Englishman in search of a lost son in the ruins of post-war France, to John Mills. However, when the film adaptation was released in 1953 she was upset that it had been turned into a musical starring Bing Crosby. She turned towards non-fiction in the 1960s and 1970s, producing works on Charlotte Mary Yonge, Jane Austen, George Eliot and Rudyard Kipling.

In the 1960s Laski was science fiction critic for The Observer.

On 1 October 1970 The Times published "The Appeal of Georgette Heyer", Laski's controversial article about the bestselling historical novelist Georgette Heyer, which raised a storm of protest from Heyer's fans.

Laski was a member of the Annan Committee on broadcasting between 1974 and 1977. She joined the Arts Council in 1979, was elected its Vice Chair in 1982, and served as the Chair of the Literature Panel from 1980 to 1984.

=== Contributions to the Oxford English Dictionary (OED) ===
Laski was an omnivorous reader, and from 1958 she was a prolific contributor to the Oxford English Dictionary (OED). By 1986 she had contributed about 250,000 quotations, making her (according to Ilan Stavans) "the supreme contributor, male or female, to the OED". Laski’s connection to the OED began in 1958, when Robert (Bob) Burchfield, Editor of the Supplement of the OED in the 1960s, published his second periodical desiderata list requesting the public’s aid in search for antedatings to specific vocabularies. It was to this list that Laski responded and began her time volunteering for the OED. In just her first year alone, Laski contributed 8,600 slips. Thus, Laski was, of course, mentioned in Burchfield’s first five-year report to the Oxford University Press (OUP) as one of the five outstanding figures who made significant input to the quotation files, in first place with 31,000 contributions. She was known to be fond of crime fiction, and her OED influence in particular to her interest in the works of Charlotte Yonge translated onto the novelist’s accession within the OED’s first and second editions. Laski had a habit of noting down in a small notebook any words that she thought would be useful for the OED in her readings. Some of these notebooks are now preserved in the OED archives. According to Burchfield, Laski also went through copious amounts of voluminous Edwardian catalogues for the names of domestic articles,^{vi} scouring through magazines and books for unregistered vocabulary.

In 1968, when the first volume of the Supplement was completed, Laski sent a purposefully timed letter to the Times Literary Supplement expressing her appreciation for the Supplement, to coincide with the date of its official publication. Laski was also one of the few individuals to receive a copy of that first volume of the Supplement even before its publication. In this letter Laski also lamented that the updating of the OED was lagging behind the development of the English language. She went as far as to call in a written submission to the Waldock Report or Waldock Committee, devoted to the modernisation of OUP. Laski conveyed her worries about how non-literary texts, which she considered a significant source of vocabulary that illuminated the history and development of the English language, were too often neglected. Her view of this matter, heavily based on her extensive historical readings, was eventually deemed quite reasonable and became an issue addressed in the OED.

It was also in 1968 that she published a series of articles in the Times Literary Supplement about her experience reading for the OED, detailing her thought process whenever she encountered innovative vocabulary. These articles prompted a letter from Phillip Grove, then Editor of Webster’s International Dictionary, in which he offered to make the quotation files of Merriam-Webster’s works available to the compilers of the OED Supplement. This led to an amicable relationship between Merriam-Webster and Oxford in the years to come.

In the 1970s Laski went on to work with Simpson on the Concise Oxford Dictionary of Proverbs. Together they filled documentary gaps in the quotations of earlier texts.

=== Broadcasting ===
Laski was a panellist on the popular UK BBC panel shows What's My Line? (1951–63), The Brains Trust (late 1950s), and Any Questions? (1960s).

== Overall views ==
An avowed atheist, Laski was also a keen supporter of the Campaign for Nuclear Disarmament. Her play The Offshore Island is about nuclear warfare.

== Critical reception ==
Anthony Boucher described her novella The Victorian Chaise Longue as "an admirably written book, highly skilled in its economic evocation of time, place and character – and a relentlessly terrifying one." Ecstasy: A Study of Some Secular and Religious Experiences has been compared to The Varieties of Religious Experience by William James in its importance. Tory Heaven, a counterfactual novel depicting a Britain ruled by a rigidly hierarchical Conservative dictatorship and satirising middle-class attitudes towards the Attlee ministry, was described as "wickedly amusing" by Ralph Straus of The Sunday Times, and as "an ingeniously contrived and wittily told tale" by Hugh Fausset of the Manchester Guardian: writing about the book in 2018, David Kynaston called it a "highly engaging, beautifully written novel".

== Death ==
Laski died at Royal Brompton Hospital, London, due to a smoking-related lung problem, on 6 February 1988, aged 72.

== Works ==
- Love on the Supertax (1944), comic novel
- Stories of Adventure (1946)
- The Patchwork Book (1946), editor
- To Bed with Grand Music (1946), as Sarah Russell
- Victorian Tales for Girls (1947), editor
- Tory Heaven or Thunder on the Right (1948), political satire
- Little Boy Lost (1949), novel
- Toasted English (US edition of Tory Heaven) (1949)
- Mrs Ewing, Mrs Molesworth and Mrs Hodgson Burnett (1950), biography
- The Village (1952) novel, reprinted 2004
- It Started in Paradise (1952), film screenplay
- The Victorian Chaise-longue (1953) novel, reprinted 1999
- The Tower (1955), short story
- Apologies (1955), caricature
- The Offshore Island (1959) play
- Ecstasy: a Study of Some Secular and Religious Experiences (1961), psychology
- A Chaplet for Charlotte Yonge (1965) editor with Georgina Battiscombe
- Jane Austen and Her World (1969), literary history
- God and Man (1971), with Metropolitan Anthony (Bloom) of Sourozh religion
- George Eliot and Her World (1973) literary history
- Kipling's English History (1974) Rudyard Kipling poems, editor
- Everyday Ecstasy (1980), psychology
- Ferry, the Jerusalem Cat (1983), story
- From Palm to Pine: Rudyard Kipling Abroad and at Home (1987), biography
- Common Ground: an Anthology (1989), editor
- To Bed with Grand Music (2001) (posthumous)

== Sources ==
- Burchfield, R.W. (2007). "Laski, Marghanita (1915–1988)". Oxford Dictionary of National Biography (online ed.). Oxford University Press. doi:10.1093/ref:odnb/39837. (Subscription, Wikipedia Library access or UK public library membership required.)
- Marghanita Laski at Persephone Books
- Marghanita Laski at IMDb
- "Two portraits of Laski". National Portrait Gallery.
