= Quantum Mistake =

South Korean manhwa series

- Cover of the ADV Manga edition of Quantum Mistake vol. 1, art by Choi Myung-su

체인지가이 Cheinji gai
- Genre: Action/adventure
- Author: Son Eun-ho
- Illustrator: Choi Myung-su
- Publisher: In Korea Daiwon C.I.
- English publisher: In US ADV Manga
- Original run: 1998–2006
- Volumes: 31

Quantum Mistake, originally titled Change Guy (Korean: 체인지가이) after its Korean-language title, is a manhwa originally published in 31 volumes between 1998 and 2006. It was authored by Son Eun-ho and illustrated by Choi Myung-su. It tells the tale of two boys, Woo-Soo Choi and Kang-Too Jee, after their souls are accidentally switched into one another's bodies.

== Plot ==
On the same day as a scientist is performing body teleportation experiments, Woo-Soo Choi and Kang Too-Jee end up in a fight after Woo-Soo Choi pulls down Kang-Too Jee's trousers accidentally. As they are fighting, the mad scientist - currently chasing a homeless person she was trying to bribe who stole the money - runs them over. She then uses them to test her new teleportation device. The transportation is successful and she then unceremoniously dumps their bodies and drives off only to find something was wrong with the device. She had just teleported their bodies, not their minds to go with them.

When he wakes up, Woo-Soo Choi sees himself lying on the ground. He realizes that his body has somehow been switched and runs his unconscious body to the hospital. When Kang Too-Jee - now in Woo-Soo Choi's body - wakes up, he appears to have amnesia and has reverted to a childlike state. Woo-Soo Choi's mother believes Woo-Soo Choi - in Kang Too-Jee's body - to be the one who caused it and chases him out of the hospital.

Woo-Soo Choi is able to find out where Kang Too-Jee lives and goes to school, but soon enough trouble appears in the form of Kang Too-Jee's old rivals and the fighting begins.

== Characters ==
=== Main characters ===
- Woo Soo-Choi: Currently has Kang Too Jee's body. He is studious to an extreme, with great concentration skills. A very kind heart, he is often misunderstood because of Kang Too-Jee's personality and past. He becomes a student of the Gyuk Moo-Do school of martial arts in order to fight one of his first enemies.
- Kang Too-Jee: Currently has Woo Soo Choi's body. As he has amnesia he is not seen often until later volumes. He recovers his memory during a fight and confronts Woo-Soo Choi. After this confrontation, he stays at Woo-Soo Choi's house at his behest so that his mother does not get upset. He becomes a student of Judo - a skill which he could never previously master, but now can do, due to Woo-Soo Choi's weak, but extremely flexible body (It is double-jointed).
- Park Yu-Na: Beautiful, popular among boys and scared of gangsters or trouble-makers. She always thought Kang Too-Jee was a scary and violent person until Choi Woo-Soo took over his body. Then she starts falling for who she thinks is Too-Jee but is really Woo-Soo.
- Do Do-He (or Do Do-Hye, Do Do-Heh): Attractive, smart and stubborn, she is Kang Too-Jee's land-lord. She also dislikes him until Choi Woo-Soo takes over his body.
- Chun Moo-Jin: Long haired, pretty-boy kind of character. He befriended Kang Too-Jee when they learned Hapkido together. Very quickly becomes obsolete as a fighter, but remains an amusing character. Also in love with 'Do Do-He' (Yun-Na's close friend).

=== Supporting characters ===
==== The Four Dragons of Goo-Ryong High School ====
- Ji Kang-Hyuk: The Leader of the Four Heavenly Dragons or the Daeil Cheonhwang of Goo-Ryong High School. He's an incredibly gifted fighter who likes to chain together aerial moves. In the beginning of the story he is the strongest fighter in Seoul. He is defeated in volume 12 by Shin Jin-Ho. After the defeat he trains for a year and learns the Corkscrew Punch in an effort to redeem himself with a rematch. After that training time he participates in the tournament against the five gang leaders from the correctional institute, and his first opponent is the Savage Mah Kang-Chul. He delivers the Corkscrew Punch countless times, but is still defeated by Mah Kang-Chul. After the match he apologizes to Shin Jin-Ho for breaking their promise of not losing until they fought each other.
- Pi Ho-Chul (Boxing): The weakest of the Four Heavenly Dragons. The good-looking, womanizer type, he crosses paths with Woo So-Choi when he tries to hit on Yuna and Do-He. He's Japan's young amateur representative, and later on when he becomes a pro-boxer, runs for nomination of Rookie of the Year. Pi Ho-Chul is the first of the four dragons to face Woo So-Choi. He challenges him to a boxing match thinking that Woo So-Choi has the boxing abilities of the real Kang Too-Jee. He loses the match, despite cheating. One year later he becomes a pro-boxer, and is easily defeated by Jegal Mih-Yang during the mainland hunting.
- Jee Dae-Woong (Judo): The second weakest of the Four Heavenly Dragons. He is a very tall, strong guy, and the captain of the judo club in Goo-Ryong High School. He is defeated by Han Sang-Jin during his revenge on the four dragons for destroying his Tae Kwon Do master. During his participation in the correctional institute tournament, he is quickly defeated by Kwon Shin's palm twisting attack.
- Dokko Dae-San (or Dokgo Dae-San) (Wrestling): He was the one who defeated Han Sang-Jin's Tae Kwon Do master. He is the captain of the wrestling club, and has great technique and strength (capable of bench pressing 300 kg). He never participates in a fight that he doesn't have 100% chance of winning. He defeats Han Sang-Jin in less than 3 minutes, when the latter goes attempts to avenge his master. After Woo So-Choi's special underwater training, he fights Dokko Dae-San and wins. A year later during the main land hunt Dokko Dae-San fights Jang-Suk Chung and loses badly. He ends up in the hospital with many bones broken, including his chin.
- Han Sang-Jin (Tae Kwon Do): A former member of the Four Heavenly Dragons. He was only a member as part of his plan to exact revenge on the four dragons for what they did to his Tae Kwon Do Instructor, Ryu Nam-Jin. A natural born talent, Han Sang-Jin prefers "real-life" training and so participates in fights often. His initial goal is to defeat the man who defeated his Tae Kwon Do instructor. He defeats Woo So-Choi at the same time he defeats Jee Dae-Woong and Pi Ho-Chul, but loses in less than 3 minutes when he challenges Dokko Dae-San. After working on Tae Kwon Do's basic kicks and punches to perfection, he is able to do a Tae Kwon Do punch with full shoulder and back strength, and that punch is the one ton hit. When he participates in the Academy of Hell tournament, his first opponent is Lee Hae-Kang. He fights a good match, capable of bringing his opponent to the ground, while about 100 men wasn't able to make him move a single step but ultimately loses due to Lee Hae-Kang's immense stamina and resilience.

==== Other Powerful Opponents ====
- Han Kang-Ho: The first powerful opponent that Woo-Soo Choi had to face as Kang Too-Jee. Han Kang-Ho was someone who Kang Too-Jee had stolen the title of the strongest from a year before the body swap. He is taken to the correctional institute, and after almost dying in there many times he manages to escape and alert Woo Soo Choi about the danger posed to him by the top five from the institute. Later he is attacked by two guys from the institute, and then Kang Too-Jee appears beating up the two guys and saves Han Kang-Ho.
- Shin Jin-Ho: A legend who defeated the strongest Mafia-Family in Guang-Ju. He received the title "The immortal". This is a guy who practiced the basic punch and the basic kick a thousand times a day from the time when he began to walk. His speed and skills are off the radar, he is the quiet-silent type of guy. He believes that anyone can become stronger, even the ones without talent; everything depends on how much sweat, tears, blood and countless hours of training one is willing to pay. Shin Jin-Ho is the first to defeat Seoul's strongest fighter, Ji Kang-Hyuk. His only defeat in life was against Woo Soo Choi in Kang Too-Jee's body. He is also the first to defeat one of the 5 leaders from the Correctional Institute, Jegal Mi-Hyang. During the fight, she stops his arms from moving with her acupuncture technique, but his countless hours of basic training overcome even that, and he defeats her with his new 13 hits technique.
- Pyo Dok-Soo: A renowned fighter in Kang-Nam. He became the leader of the strongest mafia family in one year, but was defeated by Shin Ji-Ho in the underground school battle. In the Auigdo Correctional Institute he has one of his arms broken by Sa-Mong Cho.
- Chan-Soo Kang: A bodyguard, nicknamed "One-Hit" in his street fighting days. Targeted by the Auigdo Correctional Institute guys, he is defeated by Lee Hae-Kang, ironically, in one hit.
- Sun Woo-Hyuk: Shin Jin-Ho's one and only friend (until Shin Jin-Ho befriends Kang Too-Jee after their fight).

==== Inmates of the Auigdo Correctional Institute ====
- Lee Hae-Kang (Boxing and Wrestling): Fourth year Position 'Crimson Frontline' Leader. Three years prior to the fights by the justification that they were training their junior members the senior members of his gang got him alone and beat him with pipes and bats. They all gave up because he didn't budge an inch while they beat him. During the main land hunt he easily defeats Chan-Soo Kang. In the first round from the Auigdo Correctional Institute tournament he fights a tough match against Han Sang-Jin, but in the end stands victorious.
- Jang-Suk Chung (Muay Thai Kick-Boxing): Third year leader of the Blood Moon Gang. The weakest of the five gang leaders in the Auigdo Correctional Institute, he hates people who mock his intelligence. He defeats Dokko Dae-San by escaping a STF wrestling submission maneuver. He is defeated in the Correctional Institute by Mah Kang-Chul, when he escapes from his steel cell.
- Jegal Mi-Hyang (Ushoo, Kun-Joo, etc.): Second year Leader of Spider Gang. She uses acupuncture to severe the link from her opponent's brain to bodily functions. This renders them unable to move their effected limbs. She completely defeats Pi Ho-Chul in his boxing gym during the main land hunt. She is defeated by Shin Jin-Ho during the first match in the Auigdo Correctional Institute tournament.
- Sa-Mong Cho (Advanced Judo): Third year Leader of the gang Crazy. Probably the second strongest guy from the academy, just behind Kwon Shin. His only objective is fighting Kwon Shin, the man with unlimited potential. He hospitalized his own judo mentor and asked for permission to go into the hell academy by his own will. He breaks one of Pyo Dok-Soo's arms in the Auigdo Correctional Institute. His first match is against Kang Too-Jee. In the beginning it looks like a tough match, but in the end Sa-Mong Cho defeats Kang Too-Jee easily as the experience in judo between the two is just too far. Kang Too-Jee only loses because he doesn't use his trump card snake-like punch, for a reason unexplained even till the end. His finishing move is a twist attack to one pressure point to the back of his opponent that damages the internal organs - it is a much more devastating attack than the one used by Kwon Shin.
- Kwon Shin (Total Style): Third year leader of Demon Trinity. Rumored to be the strongest of all the gang leaders in the Auigdo Correctional Institute. He is a very easy-going guy, but extremely strong. He is a fighting genius, second in that respect to no one. After feeling the attack from an opponent he can copy it and measure the enemy's strength. Kwon Shin says that the most important thing in fighting is not training but witnessing and experiencing some situations. One can become stronger this way, which explains his strength as a fighter. He only fights a man once, because he believes that there is no point in defeating the same person twice. Kwon Shin has a perfect defense technique that allows him to parry any attack without inflicting damage upon himself, and his finishing move is a twisting palm attack that damages the internal organs. During the main land hunt he is scheduled to face Woo So-Choi, but he ultimately faces Ji Kang-Hyuk, although their match is interrupted. In his first fight of the tournament he easily defeats Jee Dae-Wong with his twisting palm attack. In his second match he has to face Shin Jin-Ho. They have an incredibly intense fight reaching the top of their limits and Kwon Shin finally wins when Shin Jin-Ho collapses from physical and mental exhaustion.
- The Savage Mah Kang-Chul (No Style): Said to be the strongest man on earth, he doesn't have any style and does not use on any kind of guard or defense techniques, relying instead on his monstrous strength, stamina and adrenaline. He destroys Jang-Suk Chung which earns him a spot on the tournament. He wins his first match against Ji Kang-Hyuk. However, Ji Kang-Hyuk manages to deliver a corkscrew punch while Mah Kang-Chul was against a wall before he was defeated and caused Mah Kang-Chul to collapse from immense internal organ damage and bleeding after the fight. It is unknown whether he really dies.
