= John Hubbard (actor) =

American actor (1914–1988)

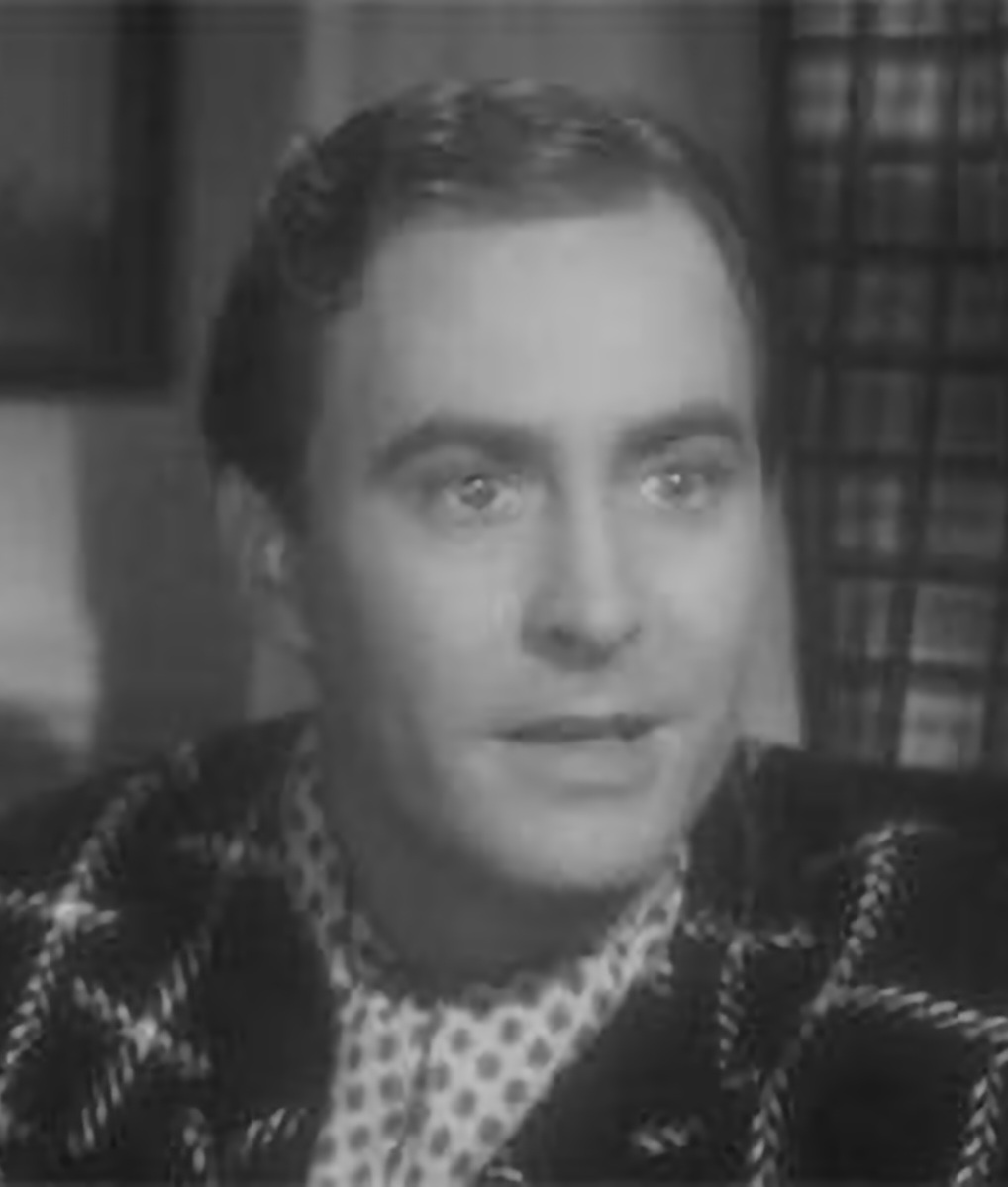
- Hubbard in Road Show (1941)
- Born: April 14, 1914; East Chicago, Indiana, U.S.
- Died: November 6, 1988 (aged 74); Camarillo, California, U.S.
- Other names: Anthony Allan; Jack Hubbard
- Occupation: Actor
- Years active: 1937–1980
- Spouse: Lois Hubbard
- Children: 3

John Hubbard (April 14, 1914 – November 6, 1988) was an American television and film actor.

== Career ==
MGM changed Hubbard's professional name to Anthony Allen and cast him in modest feature films and short subjects for one year.

In 1939, Hal Roach signed John Hubbard (under his given name) as one of five promising young actors with "star" potential (the other four were Lon Chaney Jr., Victor Mature, Carole Landis, and William Bendix). Roach saw something in Hubbard, whose handsome features lent themselves to romantic roles while his dialogue skills allowed him to play farce comedy. He was showcased in The Housekeeper's Daughter (1939) and Turnabout (1940), but when Roach abandoned full-length features for shorter featurettes, Hubbard found roles elsewhere.

During World War II Hubbard was busily engaged as a "male lead for hire" at several studios, substituting for established male stars who had joined the armed forces. With no single studio guiding his career, Hubbard never advanced to important roles in major productions, and wound up in roles in romances, mysteries, and musical comedies produced on lower budget. Hubbard himself joined the military in 1944, and resumed his movie career in 1947 at smaller, independent studios.

== Television ==
Hubbard found additional opportunities in the new field of television, as a supporting actor. He played "Brown" in The Mickey Rooney Show (12 episodes), "Bill Bronson" in My Little Margie (four episodes), "Col. U. Charles Barker" in the military comedy Don't Call Me Charlie! (18 episodes) and "Ted Gaynor" in Family Affair (eight episodes). However, most of his television assignments were single appearances in popular network series like Perry Mason, The Green Hornet, Mr. Novak and Adam-12. He was frequently cast by Warner Bros. for such series as Maverick, Hawaiian Eye, 77 Sunset Strip, Lawman, Cheyenne, and Surfside 6.

== Other media ==
In 1951 Hubbard starred on stage with Mary Brian in a comedy, Mary Had a Little, in Melbourne, Australia. Hubbard also worked in network radio, replacing Robert North as Alice Faye's brother Willy starting in the 1953–54 season of The Phil Harris-Alice Faye Show. Between acting roles, Hubbard worked as an automobile salesman and the manager of a restaurant. He retired from acting in 1974 after a character role in Herbie Rides Again, although he made one more appearance in a television movie in 1980.

== Personal life and death ==
Hubbard was married to his high school sweetheart, Lois, for nearly 50 years. The couple had three children: Lois, Jane, and John. On November 6, 1988, Hubbard died at the age of 74 in a convalescent home in Camarillo, California.

== Filmography ==
Film
Year	Title	Role	Notes
1937	Hold 'Em Navy	Midshipman Hopkins	Alternative title: That Navy Spirit
1938	The Buccaneer	Charles	
1938	The Big Broadcast of 1938	Officer	Uncredited
1938	College Swing	Student	Uncredited
1938	Cocoanut Grove	Radio Station Attendant	Uncredited
1938	You and Me	Salesman	Uncredited
1938	Prison Farm	Guard	Uncredited
1938	Men with Wings	Attendant	Uncredited
1938	Give Me a Sailor	Rodney Weatherwax	Uncredited
1938	Out West with the Hardys	Cliff Thomas	
1938	Dramatic School	Fleury	
1939	Fast and Loose	Phil Sergeant	
1939	The Kid from Texas	Bertie Thomas	credited as Anthony Allan
1939	Maisie	Richard "Ray" Raymond	credited as Anthony Allan
1939	The Housekeeper's Daughter	Robert Randall	leading role
1940	One Million B.C.	Ohtao	
1940	Turnabout	Tim Willows	leading role
1940	Who Killed Aunt Maggie?	Kirk Pierce	
1941	Road Show	Drogo Gaines	
1941	Murder Among Friends	Dr. Thomas Wilson	
1941	You'll Never Get Rich	Captain Tom Barton	
1941	Our Wife	Tom Drake	
1941	You'll Never Get Rich	Captain Tom Barton	
1942	Canal Zone	Harley Ames	
1942	The Mummy's Tomb	Dr. John Banning	
1942	Youth on Parade	Prof. Gerald Payne	
1942	Secrets of the Underground	P. Cadwallader Jones	
1943	Chatterbox	Sebastian Smart	
1943	What's Buzzin', Cousin?	Jimmy Ross	
1943	Dangerous Blondes	Kirk Fenley	
1943	There's Something About a Soldier	Michael Crocker	
1943	Whispering Footsteps	Marcus Aureus 'Mark' Borne	
1944	Beautiful But Broke	Bill Drake	
1944	Up in Mabel's Room	Jimmy Larchmont	
1944	Cowboy and the Senorita	Craig Allen	
1947	Linda Be Good	Roger Prentiss	
1948	Joe Palooka in Fighting Mad	Charles Kennedy	
1948	Mexican Hayride	David Winthrop, American Embassy	
1949	An Old-Fashioned Girl	Mr. Sydney	
1949	And Baby Makes Three	Harold York	Uncredited
1950	Second Chance	Ed Dean	
1951	Bullfighter and the Lady	Barney Flood	Alternative title: Torero
1951	The Cimarron Kid	George Weber	
1952	Big Jim McLain	Lt. Cmdr. Clint Grey	
1952	Horizons West	Sam Hunter	
1953	Walking My Baby Back Home	Rodney Millard	
1957	The Tall T	Willard Mims	
1957	Pal Joey	Stanley	Uncredited
1958	The Buccaneer	Dragoon Capt. Wilkes	
1958	Escort West	Lt. Weeks	
1963	Gunfight at Comanche Creek	Marshal Dan Shearer	
1963	Soldier in the Rain	Battalion Major	
1964	Fate Is the Hunter	Al Robbins	Uncredited
1965	The Satan Bug	Guard	Uncredited
1966	The Family Jewels	Second Pilot	
1966	Duel at Diablo	Major Novak - CO, Fort Creel	
1969	The Love God?	Craig Frazier	Uncredited
1972	Justin Morgan Had a Horse	Wellington	
1974	Herbie Rides Again	Announcer at Chicken Run	
Television
Year	Title	Role	Notes
1950	The Magnavox Theatre	Athos	1 episode
1953	The Ford Television Theatre	Peter Blakely	1 episode
1954	Four Star Playhouse	Haskell Beecher	1 episode
1955	The Lone Ranger	Major Trask	1 episode
1955	The Danny Thomas Show	1st Baseball Coach	1 episode
1956	The Bob Cummings Show	Wally Seawell	1 episode
1956	Circus Boy	Arthur	1 episode
1957	Whirlybirds	Ben Davis	1 episode
1957	How to Marry a Millionaire	Quinby	1 episode
1957	Navy Log	Skipper	1 episode
1958	The Life and Legend of Wyatt Earp	Tim Maxwell	1 episode
1958	Bronco	Aaron Lake	1 episode
1958	Frontier Doctor	Ralph Courtwright	1 episode
1959	Five Fingers	Major Kane	1 episode
1960	The DuPont Show with June Allyson	Bill	1 episode
1960	Rescue 8	Randolph	1 episode
1960	Hawaiian Eye	Gordon McLaren	1 episode
1960	Lock-Up	John Van Der Berg	1 episode
1961	Cheyenne	John Mercer	1 episode
1961	Lassie	Dr. Hank Simms	1 episode
1961	Pete and Gladys	Dr. Bill	1 episode
1962	Shannon	Dr. Fiske	1 episode
1963	Petticoat Junction	Max Thornton	1 episode
1963	Mr. Novak	Mr Belney	1 episode
1964	Mister Ed	Major Collins	1 episode
1964	Rawhide	Smitty	1 episode
1964	Karen	Tolliver	1 episode
1964	The Munsters	Duke Ramsey	1 episode
1964	Wendy and Me	Maitre D'	2 episodes
1965	McHale's Navy	Dr. Halifert	1 episode
1965	The Virginian	Dr. Wagner	1 episode
1965	Burke's Law	Mr. Farrell the Manicurist	1 episode
1965	Kraft Suspense Theatre	Dwight Hardy	1 episode
1965	Hank	Kingston	1 episode
1967	The Wild Wild West	Clive Finsbury	1 episode
1968	Green Acres	Mr. Carter	1 episode
1969	Then Came Bronson	Walt	1 episode
1970	Adam-12	Dr. Vince Packard	1 episode
1970	That Girl	Passenger	1 episode
