= The Victorian Chaise-Longue =

1953 novella by Marghanita Laski

- First edition (publ. Cresset Press)
- Author: Marghanita Laski
- Language: English
- Publisher: Cresset Press
- Publication date: 1953
- OCLC: 1684660
- LC Class: PZ3.L3334 Vg

The Victorian Chaise-Longue (1953) is a novella by the English novelist Marghanita Laski. Published in 1953, the book describes the experience of an invalided young woman who wakes up in the body of her alter-ego eighty years previously. Described by Anthony Boucher as 'relentlessly terrifying', and as 'disturbing and compulsive' by Penelope Lively, the novella plays on the fear of the unexpected and unknown.

It was republished in 1999 by Persephone Books.

== Reception ==
The New York Times reviewer Kenneth Fearing praised the story as "a subdued, evenly paced nightmare." Writing in F&SF, Anthony Boucher described The Victorian Chaise Longue as "an admirably written book, highly skilled in its economic evocation of time, place and character - and a relentlessly terrifying one." P. Schuyler Miller placed the "slight but beautifully written" novella on "the borderlands of fantasy and science fiction."

== Television ==
Two adaptations of the story were produced for American television. The first, in 1957, starred Joan Fontaine and appeared on the Ronald Reagan-hosted General Electric Theater. The second, starring Frances White, appeared as an episode of Studio 4 in the United Kingdom in 1962.
