= Shishunki Bitter Change =

Japanese manga series

思春期ビターチェンジ (Shishunki Bitā Chenji)
- Genre: Coming-of-age, drama
- Manga
- Written by: Masayoshi
- Published by: Flex Comix
- Imprint: Polaris Comics
- Magazine: Comic Polaris
- Original run: 25 October 2012 – 15 January 2019
- Volumes: 9

Shishunki Bitter Change (思春期ビターチェンジ, Shishunki Bitā Chenji; lit. Puberty Bitter Change) is a manga series written and illustrated by Masayoshi. It was published in the web comic magazine Comic Polaris from October 2012 to January 2019 and was collected in nine tankōbon volumes from October 2013 to January 2019.

== Plot ==
Fourth graders Yūta Kimura and Yui Ōtsuka inexplicably swap bodies after Yūta falls from a tree and lands on Yui. Years pass, and with no known way to change back to their former selves, the two struggle through adolescence. Filled with comical, relatable, and heartwarming moments, the two struggle to handle each other's lives in the other person's shoes.

== Characters ==
=== Main ===
- Yuuta Kimura (木村 佑太, Kimura Yūta) He was formerly a thrill-seeking boy, but "he's" now mature since Yui took over his body.
- Yui Ootsuka (大塚 結依, Ōtsuka Yui) She was formerly a lone, "goody-two shoes" girl, but "she's" now gregarious since Yuuta took over her body.

=== Supporting ===
- Kazuma Takaoka (高岡 和馬, Takaoka Kazuma) - Yuuta's best friend who becomes his and Yui's mutual confidant, the only person fully aware of their situation.
- Haruki Kimura (木村 春樹, Kimura Haruki) - Yuuta's little brother who quickly realizes his brother has changed into a different person but grows fond of the new Yuuta (actually Yui).
- Hiromi Kinoshita (Kinoshita Hiromi) - Yuuta's middle school classmate who is attracted to him (actually Yui).
- Chiharu Aoki (Aoki Chiharu) - Yui's middle school classmate and friend after she (actually Yuuta) stands up to her bullies.
- Hikaru Kikuchi (菊池 ひかる, Kikuchi Hikaru) - Yuuta's high school classmate, an aspiring musician who befriends him (actually Yui).
- Hayato Tachibana (橘 隼人, Tachibana Hayato) - Yui's high school classmate whom she (actually Yuuta) befriends at the request of a teacher.
- Koizumi Erina (小泉えりな Erina Koizumi) - Yui's high school classmate whom she (actually Yuuta) befriends. She found out the two's secret, about switching, but not what exactly Yuuta's original body is.

== Media ==
=== Manga ===
Written and illustrated by Masayoshi, Shishunki Bitter Change was serialized in Flex Comix's shōjo web manga magazine Comic Polaris from 25 October 2012 to 15 January 2019. Its chapters were collected into nine tankōbon volumes from 15 October 2013 to 15 January 2019.

==== Volume list ====
No.	Japanese release date	Japanese ISBN
1	15 October 2013	978-4-593-88077-5
2	15 January 2014	978-4-593-88089-8
3	12 September 2014	978-4-593-88102-4
4	15 May 2015	978-4-866-75960-9
5	15 January 2016	978-4-866-75968-5
6	15 September 2016	978-4-866-75974-6
7	15 June 2017	978-4-866-75985-2
8	15 May 2018	978-4-866-75014-9
9	15 January 2019	978-4866750460

=== Other ===
The series had an illustration collaboration with I Love Yuri and I Got Bodyswapped With a Fujoshi! by Ajiichi that was included in the special release of the seventh volume.

A reading of the manga was held at the Tsukiji Hongan-ji Buddhist hall between October 17–20, 2019. It featured Kazutomi Yamamoto and Hiroshi Watanabe as Yuuta Kimura, Eri Inagawa and Minami Shinoda as Yui Ootsuka, Shohei Komatsu and Arthur Lounsbery as Kazuma Takaoka.

== Reception ==
The series ranked 15th in the first Next Manga Award in the print manga category.
