= Thorne Smith =

American writer (1892–1934)

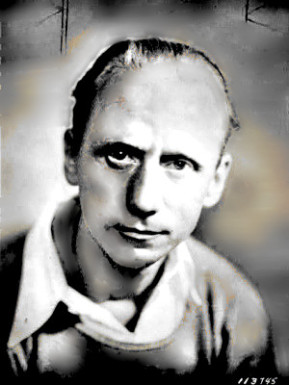
- Smith in the mid-1920s
- Born: James Thorne Jr; March 27, 1892; Annapolis, Maryland, U.S.
- Died: June 20, 1934 (aged 42); Florida, U.S.
- Education: Dartmouth College
- Occupations: In advertising; Author; Screenwriter
- Spouse: Celia Sullivan
- Writing career
- Period: 1918–1934, 1941 (posthumously)
- Genres: Fantasy comedy, Screenwriting, Poetry, Mystery fiction,
- Notable works: Topper; The Night Life of the Gods; Turnabout

James Thorne Smith Jr. (March 27, 1892 – June 20, 1934) was an American writer of humorous supernatural fantasy fiction under the byline Thorne Smith. He is best known today for the two Topper novels, comic fantasy fiction involving sex, frequent drinking and ghosts. With racy illustrations, these sold millions of copies in the 1930s and were equally popular in paperbacks of the 1950s.

== Life ==
Smith was born in Annapolis, Maryland, the son of a Navy commodore. He attended Locust Dale Academy, a boarding school, in Virginia (now closed), St. Luke's preparatory school in Wayne, Pennsylvania, and two years at Dartmouth College. He left in June 1912.

In his 2012 biography, A Man Named Smith: The Novels and Screen Legacy of Thorne Smith, Anthony Slide writes, "Thorne Smith left no papers, anyone writing about the author must, of necessity, rely on one primary source, and that is the 1951 dissertation by Joseph Leo Blotner titled Thorne Smith: A Study in Popular Fiction." However, we also have the short 32-page biography, Thorne Smith: His Life and Times, written by the actor Roland Young, a close friend of Smith since 1930 who played the character Topper in several movie adaptations of Smith's work.

The period between 1912 and Smith's enlistment in the Navy (1917) is not well-documented. He spent time with his father, and worked in advertising.

In the winter of 1916, Smith and the poet Dorothy Parker (Dorothy Rothschild at the time) lived at the same New York boarding house at 103rd Street and Broadway. The exact nature of their relationship is not clear; Dorothy Parker herself stated, "We used to sit around in the evening and talk. There was no money but Jesus we had fun." Anthony Slide makes more of it, saying "Smith would spend time in Parker's room, drinking coffee, helping her revise her poetry and making love."

He enlisted in the US Navy in December 1917, the United States having entered World War I in April 1917. He was appointed editor of the Naval Reserve newspaper The Broadside. After the war ended, Smith left the Navy in January and moved to Greenwich Village. In need of money, he worked part-time as an advertising agent.

He lived for two years at the Greenwich Village Inn, where Young reports that he kept company with Sinclair Lewis, John Reed, Barney Gallant, Harold Stearns, Jack Conroy, and "various other stout spirits." He also met his future wife, Celia Sullivan, in Greenwich Village. They were married in the fall of 1919 in Rye, New York. Their first daughter, Marion, was born on November 14, 1922, and their second daughter June on March 4, 1924.

He was an early resident of Free Acres, a social experimental community developed by Bolton Hall according to the economic principles of Henry George, in Berkeley Heights, New Jersey.

Young wrote that Smith seldom frequented night clubs and preferred his "small estate in New Jersey to his city apartment, and the soft coasts of southern France to either."

He died of a heart attack in 1934 at the age of 42 while vacationing in Florida.

== Writing career ==
Between 1919 when he left the Navy and the publication of Topper, Smith's only published works were Biltmore Oswald: The Diary of a Hapless Recruit, a compilation of his stories in The Broadside; a sequel, Out O' Luck: Biltmore Oswald Very Much at Sea; and Haunts and Bypaths, a book of poetry.

Topper was published in 1926.

In the eight years after Topper, he wrote another eleven works of fiction. One was a serious novel (Dream's End 1927), one a mystery novel (Did She Fall?; 1930), and one a children's book (Lazy Bear Lane; 1931). The rest contained many of the same comedic elements as Topper.

Smith characterized his own works within a short autobiographical section (less than eight pages) within Young's book:

Like life itself my stories have no point and get absolutely nowhere. And like life they are a little mad and purposeless. They resemble those people who watch with placid concentration a steam shovel digging a large hole in the ground. They are almost as purposeless as a dignified commuter an impotent fist after a train he has just missed. They are like the man who dashes madly through traffic only to linger aimlessly on the opposite corner watching a fountain pen being demonstrated in a shop window. Quite casually I wander into my plot, poke around with my characters for a while, then amble off, leaving no moral proved, and no reader improved.

Paul Di Filippo in the St. James Guide to Fantasy Writers wrote of Smith's writing:

If one were to attempt to fabricate a writer from bits and pieces of Charles Bukowski, S. J. Perelman, Damon Runyon, Lewis Carroll and Mark Twain, one might possibly come close to creating a figure like Thorne Smith. But such a chimera would still surely not possess the original's high-spirited elan, sense of utter irresponsibility and fine disdain for all forms of convention—traits which found their perfect embodiment in a series of "ribald" screwball novels where the fantastic plays a pivotal part in disrupting society, unleashing repressed individuals and shattering unnatural strictures.

== Influences ==
Roland Young described Smith as someone who mostly read "serious" authors such as "Wassermann, Knut Hamsun, Nexø, Rolland and William Beebe, and a number of writers on travel and exploration".

Thorne Smith himself acknowledged no influences.

Anthony Slide wrote of Smith:

The most obvious, but unacknowledged, influence in the writings of Thorne Smith is the English novelist Thomas Anstey Guthrie (1856–1934), who wrote under the pseudonym of F. Anstey. His first novel, Vice Versa, published in 1882, contains elements to be found in Smith's work. It is rightfully argued that all "body swap" plots [e.g. Smith's Turnabout] owe much to Anstey's writings.

== Works ==
- Biltmore Oswald: The Diary of a Hapless Recruit (1918). A series of comic stories written for the Naval Reserve journal The Broadside while Smith was in the Navy. It sold 70,000 copies.
- Out O' Luck: Biltmore Oswald Very Much at Sea (1919).
- Haunts and Bypaths (1919). A book of poetry.
- Topper (1926, copyright renewed 1953, but now in the public domain in the US; also known as The Jovial Ghosts). This and its sequel, Topper Takes a Trip (1932, set in the French Riviera), are probably Smith's most famous work. They concern a respectable banker called Cosmo Topper, married to his depressingly staid wife Mary, and his misadventures with a couple of ghosts, Marion and George Kerby, who introduce him to other ghosts. He is romantically attracted to Marion, who at one point tries to kill him so that they can always be together. Mary is treated sympathetically—she does not like what she has become and tries to change.
- Dream's End (1927, copyright renewed 1955). A serious novel that was not a success.
- The Stray Lamb (1929). Mild-mannered investment banker, cuckold, and dipsomaniac T. Lawrence Lamb gains perspective on the human condition during a series of mysterious transformations into various animal forms. Lamb, his daughter Hebe, her boyfriend Melville Long, and Hebe's friend Sandra Rush (a twentyish lingerie model who becomes Lamb's love interest) pursue several adventures, most of which fall well outside the perimeter of law and order. Lamb has a shrewish and adulterous wife who tries to murder him when he is a goldfish. A courtroom scene involving the protagonists and an exasperated judge provides a climax.
- Did She Fall? (1930).
- The Night Life of the Gods (1931). Quirky inventor Hunter Hawk strikes gold when he invents a device enabling him to turn living matter into stone. After a chaotic field test he meets stunning 900-year-old Megaera, who teaches him to turn stone into flesh. They and some friends set their sights on New York City to bring the Roman gods of the Metropolitan Museum of Art to life: Mercury shows himself an expert pickpocket, while Neptune causes chaos in the fish market.
- Turnabout (1931) is a comedic body-swap novel. In response to the constant bickering of a young married couple, an Egyptian idol causes them to switch bodies.
- Lazy Bear Lane (1931). A children's book.
- The Bishop's Jaegers (1932). The depressed, indifferent heir of a vast coffee import fortune, Peter Van Dyke finds his life and high society engagement turned upside down when his secretary, Josephine Duval, determines to “rescue” him by ruining him morally. After a scandal in a coat closet, he is cast adrift in a fog with a motley crew that includes a bishop of the Episcopal Church and a former nude model named Aspirin Liz. The party lands on the shores of a naturist resort, and the liberation of the coffee importer is set in motion.
- Rain in the Doorway (1933). A cuckold husband, Hector Owen, inadvertently becomes a partner in a big-city department store. The bulk of the action involves the inebriated adventures of Owen, his three partners (Mr. Horace Larkin, a man called Dinner, and Major Barney Britt-Britt), and a salesgirl from the pornographic books department, Miss Honor "Satin" Knightly. The novel includes many direct suggestions of sexual encounters, accompanied with cartoons of nude women cavorting with the protagonists, drawn by artist Herbert Roese.
- Skin and Bones (1933). A photographer's freak accident in the darkroom produces a chemical concoction causing him and his dog to randomly switch back and forth between normal and X-ray (skeleton) versions of themselves. Drinking and cavorting ensues as he finds people able to see beyond his appearance and appreciate him for who he is, while inadvertently terrifying those who cannot.
- The Glorious Pool (1934). Set in the backdrop of the Volstead Act (Prohibition), two unrepentant reprobates are celebrating the 25th anniversary of the seduction which made the stylish Rex Pebble into an adulterer and his companion, Spray Summers, into his mistress. While their exasperating and alcoholic Japanese houseboy, Nakashima, plays jujitsu with the English language, the two slip into a swimming pool, the waters of which have been changed into a fountain of youth. Abandoning their clothes and modesty with their advanced years, the newfound youthfulness of their bodies puts into motion an evening of hijinks.
- The Passionate Witch (1941, published posthumously and completed by Norman H. Matson). A sequel to the novel, Bats in the Belfry (1942), is entirely by Matson, though sometimes attributed to Smith.

The Thorne Smith 3-Decker (Sun Dial Press, 1933) included The Stray Lamb, Turnabout and Rain in the Doorway.

During World War II, Skin and Bones, Turnabout, The Night Life of the Gods, The Passionate Witch, The Stray Lamb, The Bishop's Jaegers, The Glorious Pool, and Rain in the Doorway were all published in mass-market sized paperbacks by Armed Services Editions for distribution to the military.

== Influence ==
Topper was made into a film of the same name starring Cary Grant as George Kerby, Constance Bennett as Marion Kerby, and Roland Young as Cosmo Topper. Two filmed sequels followed: Topper Takes a Trip, in 1939, and Topper Returns, in 1941. The latter film was not based on a book. Young reprised the role in the 1945 NBC radio summer replacement series The Adventures of Topper. The books were adapted into an American television series, Topper, beginning in 1953, with Leo G. Carroll as Cosmo Topper, and Robert Sterling and Anne Jeffreys as the ghosts. Seventy-eight episodes were made.

Night Life of the Gods was made into a film of the same name in 1935. It was cited in the book, Fantasy: The Best 100 Books.

Turnabout inspired both a film (1940) and a short-lived 1979 television sitcom starring Sharon Gless and John Schuck (canceled after six episodes), and to some extent the last broadcast episode of Star Trek: The Original Series, "Turnabout Intruder". Turnabout was one of the inspirations for Mary Rodgers' popular young adult novel Freaky Friday (1972). As she was considering a new children's book, following several picture books for young children, she remembered "that when I was fourteen, I'd read and loved a novel called Turnabout, by Thorne Smith. Vicious and hilarious, it was something I thought I could emulate in children's fiction ... for teens."

The Passionate Witch was produced in 1942 as the film I Married a Witch. It was one of the inspirations, along with Bell, Book and Candle, for the long-running TV series Bewitched.
