= Airhead (novel) =

Novel by Meg Cabot

- First edition
- Author: Meg Cabot
- Language: English
- Series: Airhead
- Genre: Sci-Fi/Comedy and Drama
- Publisher: Point
- Publication date: May 13, 2008(hardback), April 7, 2009 (paperback)
- Publication place: United States
- Pages: 337
- Followed by: Being Nikki

Airhead is a young-adult novel by Meg Cabot. It was released on May 13, 2008. The sequel, Being Nikki, was released in May 2009. The third book in the series Runaway was released in March 2010.

The book is about a teenage girl whose life is forever changed by the tragic accident that leaves her taking the identity of a supermodel, Nikki Howard. Thrown into a completely unfamiliar world, she's forced to hide her old identity in order to personify her current one.

== Plot ==
Emerson "Em" Watts accompanies her sister, Frida, and her best friend, Christopher, to a Stark Megastore opening in SoHo, which is attended by teen supermodel Nikki Howard and British musician Gabriel Luna, who Frida hopes to meet. Protesters attend the event because the Stark Megastore has replaced a locally owned grocery store, and one of the protesters shoots a plasma screen with a paintball gun, snapping the wires. Em saves her sister from being hit by the falling plasma screen but takes the hit herself. At almost the same moment, Nikki faints.

A month later, Em finds herself in the hospital, trying to recall what had happened. She finds out she is in Nikki's body when she is kidnapped by Lulu Collins, Nikki's roommate, and Brandon Stark, her on-again, off-again boyfriend and heir to the Stark fortune. Em tries to remember the events that led to her current state and finds out that not only did she die during the accident, Nikki had collapsed from a brain aneurysm at the same time. In an effort to save Em, her parents agreed to a controversial brain transplant offered by Stark Industries, transplanting her brain into Nikki's body, on the condition that Em continues Nikki's career as the face of Stark Industries; the penalty for breaching this contract would be two million dollars.

Em is forced to take on the role of Nikki Howard, all the while struggling with the fact that she does not have control over her life. She tries to let go of her tomboyish ways to take over Nikki's glamorous lifestyle. Although she is now dealing with Nikki's job, friends, and various boyfriends, she fights to keep some of her old life by going back to school and facing Christopher, whom she has a secret crush on. As Em follows through with Nikki's commitments, she realizes that the supermodel lifestyle is a lot harder than she perceived it to be. When Em notices that Christopher is now a mess because of her supposed death, she goes out of her way to talk to him, and try to make him realize that she is still alive in someone else's body.

The novel ends with Em bringing Lulu to her family's house for dinner, Em learns that Lulu doesn't have a family and spends most of her time drinking and partying. When asked by Lulu how she knows her family, Em answers, "I don't know where to begin".

== Characters ==
- Emerson "Em" Watts/Nikki Howard- Forced to become Nikki Howard after a freak accident.
- Lulu Collins- Nikki's best friend. Father is a film producer and is girlfriend to Justin Bay.
- Brandon Stark-heir to Stark Enterprises, Nikki's on-again off-again boyfriend.
- Christopher Maloney- Em's former best friend. After Em's death, he becomes withdrawn from life, according to Frida.
- Frida "Free" Watts- Em's fourteen-year-old sister who adores (the real) Nikki and Gabriel Luna. She becomes popular after she makes the JV Cheerleading squad and is seen talking to Nikki Howard (Em) at school.
- Mrs. Watts- Mother of Frida and Em, forced with Mr. Watts to sign a contract with Stark Enterprises claiming Em Watts allegedly dead though she has been brain-transplanted into Nikki Howard's body.
- Mr. Watts- Father of Frida and Em, forced with Mrs. Watts to make a deal with Stark Enterprises.
- Robert Stark- creator of Stark Enterprises.
- Nikki Howard- Face of Stark, world famous supermodel who dies having an aneurysm.

== Sequels ==
Airhead is the first book of a three book series. The subsequent books are:

- Being Nikki (2009)
- Runaway (2010)
