= Bren (disambiguation) =

The Bren is a light machine gun.

Bren or BREN may also refer to:

== Weapons ==
- Bren Carrier or Universal Carrier, a family of light armoured tracked vehicles built by Vickers-Armstrong
- CZ 805 BREN, a Czech assault rifle created in 2009

== Places ==
- Bren, Drôme, France, a commune
- Breń, Lesser Poland Voivodeship, Poland
- Breń, West Pomeranian Voivodeship, Poland, a village

== School-related ==
- Bren School of Environmental Science & Management, University of California, Santa Barbara
- Donald Bren School of Information and Computer Sciences, also known as the Bren School, University of California, Irvine
- Bren Events Center, a stadium on the campus of the University of California, Irvine
- Bren Hall, a hall on the campus of University of California, Santa Barbara

== People ==
- Bren (surname)
- nickname of Avraham Adan (1926–2012), Israeli major general
- Bren Foster (born 1978), English-born Australian actor
- Bren Simmers (born 1976), Canadian poet
- Bren Spillane (born 1996), American baseball player

== Fictional characters ==
- Bren Cameron, main character of C. J. Cherryh's Foreigner series science fiction series
- Brenda "Bren" Furlong, main character of the British sitcom dinnerladies
- Bren, one of the protagonists of the American television series Monsuno

== Other uses ==
- BREN or Bulgarian Research and Education Network
- BREN Tower, a guyed steel framework mast on the Nevada Test Site in Nevada, U.S.

== See also ==
- Bren Ten, a semi-automatic pistol
- Brens, Ain, France, a commune
- Brens, Tarn, France, a commune
