= Bren School =

Bren School may refer to:

- UC Santa Barbara Bren School of Environmental Science and Management (renamed in 1997) at UC Santa Barbara
- Donald Bren School of Information and Computer Sciences (renamed in 2004) at UC Irvine
