= 1986 American Racing Series season =

The 1986 American Racing Series Championship consisted of 10 races and was the inaugural season for the series. Fabrizio Barbazza won five races on his way to the championship.

This was a "spec series", and all cars were March 86A Wildcat, powered by Buick V6 engines.

== Calendar ==
Race No	Track	State	Date	Laps	Distance	Time	Speed	Winner	Pole position	Most leading laps	Fastest race lap
1	Phoenix	Arizona	April 6, 1986	76	1.6093=122.3068 km	0'37:58.23	193.266 km/h	Steve Millen	Kim Campbell	Kim Campbell	?
2	Milwaukee	Wisconsin	June 8, 1986	75	1.6607976=124.55982 km	0'38:56.19	191.943 km/h	Mike Groff	Jeff Andretti	Mike Groff	?
3	Meadowlands	New Jersey	June 29, 1986	44	2.7229356=119.809166 km	0'51:44.117	136.515 km/h	Fabrizio Barbazza	Fabrizio Barbazza	Fabrizio Barbazza	?
4	Toronto	Canada	July 20, 1986	42	2.8709912=120.58163 km	0'47:54.656	151.007 km/h	Fabrizio Barbazza	Fabrizio Barbazza	Fabrizio Barbazza	?
5	Pocono	Pennsylvania	August 16, 1986	40	4.02325=160.93 km	0'40:52.11	236.265 km/h	Jeff Andretti	Jeff Andretti	Mike Groff	?
6	Lexington	Ohio	August 31, 1986	31	3.86232=119.73192 km	0'44:41.550	160.741 km/h	Steve Millen	Steve Millen	Steve Millen	?
7	Elkhart Lake	Wisconsin	September 20, 1986	19	6.4372=122.3068 km	0'41:23.38	177.300 km/h	Mike Groff	Juan Manuel Fangio II	Mike Groff	?
8	Monterey	California	October 12, 1986	40	3.05767=120.3068 km	0'41:17.328	174.827 km/h	Fabrizio Barbazza	Tommy Byrne	Steve Millen	?
9	Phoenix	Arizona	October 19, 1986	75	1.6093=120.6975 km	0'37:11.24	194.740 km/h	Fabrizio Barbazza	Jeff Andretti	Fabrizio Barbazza	?
10	Miami	Florida	November 9, 1986	22	2.8709912=63.1618064 km	0'25:54.98	146.229 km/h	Fabrizio Barbazza	Fabrizio Barbazza	Juan Manuel Fangio II	?

== Race summaries ==
=== Phoenix race 1 ===
Held April 6 at Phoenix International Raceway. Kim Campbell won the pole. This was the first race for the series.

Top Five Results

1. 5- Steve Millen
2. 3- Cary Bren
3. 12- Fabrizio Barbazza
4. 8- Billy Boat
5. 85- Jeff Andretti

=== Milwaukee race ===
Held June 8 at The Milwaukee Mile. Jeff Andretti won the pole.

Top Five Results

1. 20- Mike Groff
2. 1- Jerrill Rice
3. 85- Jeff Andretti
4. 5- Steve Millen
5. 10- Stan Fox

=== Meadowlands race ===
Held June 29 at the Meadowlands Sports Complex. Fabrizio Barbazza won the pole.

Top Five Results

1. 12- Fabrizio Barbazza
2. 4- Tommy Byrne
3. 2- Steve Bren
4. 1- Jerrill Rice
5. 14- Brad Murphey

=== Toronto race ===
Held July 20 at Exhibition Place. Fabrizio Barbazza won the pole.

Top Five Results

1. 12- Fabrizio Barbazza
2. 20- Mike Groff
3. 3- Cary Bren
4. 9- John Graham
5. 8- Sammy Swindell

=== Pocono race ===
Held August 16 at Pocono Raceway. Jeff Andretti won the pole.

Top Five Results

1. 85- Jeff Andretti
2. 20- Mike Groff
3. 59- Nick Fornoro Jr.
4. 4- Tommy Byrne
5. 7- Sammy Swindell

=== Mid-Ohio race ===
Held August 31 at The Mid-Ohio Sports Car Course. Steve Millen won the pole.

Top Five Results

1. 10- Steve Millen
2. 12- Fabrizio Barbazza
3. 15- Ross Cheever
4. 85- Jeff Andretti
5. 8- Billy Boat

=== Elkhart Lake race ===
Held September 20 at Road America. Juan Manuel Fangio II won the pole.

Top Five Results

1. 20- Mike Groff
2. 85- Jeff Andretti
3. 9- Tommy Byrne
4. 15- Ross Cheever
5. 2- Gary Rubio

=== Laguna Seca race ===
Held October 12 at Mazda Raceway Laguna Seca. Tommy Byrne won the pole.

Top Five Results

1. 12- Fabrizio Barbazza
2. 71- Steve Millen
3. 3- Juan Manuel Fangio II
4. 84- Albert Naon Jr.
5. 6- Dave Simpson

=== Phoenix race ===
Held October 19 at Phoenix International Raceway. Jeff Andretti won the pole.

Top Five Results

1. 12- Fabrizio Barbazza
2. 3- Juan Manuel Fangio II
3. 8- Billy Boat
4. 85- Jeff Andretti
5. 4- Davy Jones

=== Miami race ===
Held November 9 at Tamiami Park. Fabrizio Barbazza won the pole.

Top Five Results

1. 12- Fabrizio Barbazza
2. 3- Juan Manuel Fangio II
3. 85- Jeff Andretti
4. 84- Albert Naon Jr.
5. 71- Steve Millen

== Final points standings ==
=== Driver ===
For every race the points were awarded: 20 points to the winner, 16 for runner-up, 14 for third place, 12 for fourth place, 10 for fifth place, 8 for sixth place, 6 seventh place, winding down to 1 points for 12th place. Additional points were awarded to the pole winner (1 point) and to the driver leading the most laps (1 point).

Place	Name	Country	Team	Total points	(United States)	(United States)	(United States)	(Canada)	(United States)	(United States)	(United States)	(United States)	(United States)	(United States)
1	Fabrizio Barbazza	Italy	Arciero Racing	145	14	-	22	22	3	16	6	20	21	21
2	Jeff Andretti	United States	Ralph Sanchez Racing	107	10	15	3	3	21	12	16	-	13	14
3	Mike Groff	United States	Groff Motorsports	89	1	21	1	16	17	-	21	6	6	-
4	Steve Millen	New Zealand	Truesports	85	20	12	4	-	-
4	Steve Millen	New Zealand	?	85						22	-
4	Steve Millen	New Zealand	Hemelgarn Racing	85								17	-	10
5	Juan Manuel Fangio II	Argentina	Ralph Sanchez Racing	69	-	-	2	6	6
5	Juan Manuel Fangio II	Argentina	?	69						5	3	14	16	17
6	Billy Boat	United States	Marsh Holt Racing	67	12	2	6	-	5	10	8	5	14	5
7	Tommy Byrne	Ireland	Agapiou Racing	62	-	5	16	5	12	1	14	1	-	8
8	Sam Swindell	United States	?	40	6	-	-	10
8	Sam Swindell	United States	Cahill Brothers Racing	40					10	6	4	1	2	1
9	Cary Bren	United States	?	38	16	3	5	14	-	-	-	-	-	-
10	Jerrill Rice	United States	?	37	5	16	12	4	-	-	-	-	-	-
	Albert Naon Jr.	United States	Ralph Sanchez Racing	37	-	6	-	-	2	2	3
	Albert Naon Jr.	United States	Duration Racing	37								12	-	12
12	Brad Murphey	United States	Louis Motorsports	33	-	-	10	8	4	4	-	3	4	-
13	Nick Fornoro Jr.	United States	?	30	-	-	-	-	14	8	5	2	1	-
14	Ross Cheever	United States	Brian Stewart Racing	26	-	-	-	-	-	14
14	Ross Cheever	United States	Agapiou Racing	26							12	-	-	-
15	Stan Fox	United States	Ralph Sanchez Racing	23	4
15	Stan Fox	United States	?	23		10	-	-
15	Stan Fox	United States	Cahill Brothers Racing	23					1	-	-	-
15	Stan Fox	United States	Agapiou Racing	23									8	-
16	Steve Bren	United States	?	17	-	1	14	2	-	-	-	-	-	-
	Dave Simpson	United States	Bill Simpson Racing	17	-	-	-	-	-	-	-	10	5	2
18	Kim Campbell	United States	Motorsports Racing	12	4	8	-	-	-	-	-	-	-	-
	Scott Wood	United States	Agapiou Racing	12	-	4	8	-	-	-	-	-	-	-
	John Graham	Canada	Agapiou Racing	12	-	-	-	12	-	-	-	-	-	-
21	Jim Busby Jr.	United States	?	11	-	-	-	-	-	-	-	8	3	-
22	Gary Rubio	United States	?	10	-	-	-	-	-	-	10	-	-	-
	Davy Jones	United States	Agapiou Racing	10	-	-	-	-	-	-	-	-	10	-
24	Desiré Wilson	South Africa	?	8	8	-	-	-	-	-	-	-	-	-
	Ian Ashley	United Kingdom	Agapiou Racing	8	-	-	-	8	-	-	-	-	-	-
26	Rich Rutherford	United States	?	7	3	-	-	-	-	-	-	-	-
26	Rich Rutherford	United States	Ian Gordon Racing	7										4
27	Guido Daccò	Italy	Agapiou Racing	6	-	-	-	-	-	-	-	-	-	6
28	Jan Thoelke	West Germany	Agapiou Racing	4	-	-	-	-	-	-	-	4	-	-
29	Jack Miller	United States	Agapiou Racing	3	-	-	-	-	-	3	-	-	-	-
	Bobby Fix	United States	?	3	-	-	-	-	-	-	-	-	-	3

Note:

Race 4 and 7 not all points were awarded (not enough competitors).

== Complete Overview ==
first column of every race	10	= grid position

second column of every race	10	= race result

R10=retired, but classified

Place	Name	Country	Team	(United States)		(United States)		(United States)		(Canada)		(United States)		(United States)		(United States)		(United States)		(United States)		(United States)
1	Fabrizio Barbazza	Italy	Arciero Racing	2	3	-	-	1	1	1	1	4	R10	5	2	3	R7	5	1	2	1	1	1
2	Jeff Andretti	United States	Ralph Sanchez Racing	8	5	1	3	7	R10	2	R10	1	1	2	4	11	2	8	R14	1	4	6	3
3	Mike Groff	United States	Groff Motorsports	9	R12	3	1	8	R12	6	2	2	2	3	R13	2	1	6	7	3	7	-	-
4	Steve Millen	New Zealand	Truesports	4	1	5	4	2	9	-	-	-	-
4	Steve Millen	New Zealand	?											1	1	-	-
4	Steve Millen	New Zealand	Hemelgarn Racing															2	2	-	-	4	5
5	Juan Manuel Fangio II	Argentina	Ralph Sanchez Racing	-	-	-	-	3	R11	5	7	5	7
5	Juan Manuel Fangio II	Argentina	?											4	8	1	R11	4	3	4	2	2	2
6	Billy Boat	United States	Marsh Holt Racing	11	4	6	R11	12	7	-	-	13	8	12	5	7	R6	12	8	8	3	10	8
7	Tommy Byrne	Ireland	Agapiou Racing	-	-	10	8	4	2	4	R8	3	4	8	R12	6	3	1	R13	-	-	5	6
8	Sam Swindell	United States	?	7	7	-	-	-	-	10	5
8	Sam Swindell	United States	Cahill Brothers Racing									10	5	10	7	8	R9	10	R12	7	R11	7	12
9	Cary Bren	United States	?	3	2	7	10	5	R8	8	3	-	-	-	-	-	-	-	-	-	-	-	-
10	Jerrill Rice	United States	?	5	8	4	2	11	4	7	R9	7	R13	-	-	-	-	-	-	-	-	-	-
	Albert Naon Jr.	United States	Ralph Sanchez Racing	-	-	11	7	10	R14	-	-	11	R11	7	R11	5	R10
	Albert Naon Jr.	United States	Duration Racing															9	4	-	-	3	4
12	Brad Murphey	United States	Louis Motorsports	-	-	-	-	13	5	11	6	12	9	11	9	-	-	14	10	12	9	-	-
13	Nick Fornoro Jr.	United States	?	-	-	-	-	-	-	-	-	6	3	13	6	9	R8	15	11	11	R12	-	-
14	Ross Cheever	United States	Brian Stewart Racing	-	-	-	-	-	-	-	-	-	-	6	3
14	Ross Cheever	United States	Agapiou Racing													4	4	3	R15	-	-	-	-
15	Stan Fox	United States	Ralph Sanchez Racing	6	9
15	Stan Fox	United States	?			9	5	-	-	-	-
15	Stan Fox	United States	Cahill Brothers Racing									8	R12	-	-	-	-	-	-
15	Stan Fox	United States	Agapiou Racing																	10	6	-	-
16	Steve Bren	United States	?	13	R14	2	R12	5	3	3	R11	-	-	-	-	-	-	-	-	-	-	-	-
	Dave Simpson	United States	Bill Simpson Racing	-	-	-	-	-	-	-	-	-	-	-	-	-	-	7	5	9	8	8	11
18	Kim Campbell	United States	Motorsports Racing	1	R11	8	6	9	R13	-	-	-	-	-	-	-	-	-	-	-	-	-	-
	Scott Wood	United States	Agapiou Racing	-	-	12	9	14	6	-	-	-	-	-	-	-	-	-	-	-	-	-	-
	John Graham	Canada	Agapiou Racing	-	-	-	-	-	-	9	4	-	-	-	-	-	-	-	-	-	-	-	-
21	Jim Busby Jr.	United States	?	-	-	-	-	-	-	-	-	-	-	-	-	-	-	11	6	6	R10	-	-
22	Gary Rubio	United States	?	-	-	-	-	-	-	-	-	-	-	-	-	10	5	-	-	-	-	-	-
	Davy Jones	United States	Agapiou Racing	-	-	-	-	-	-	-	-	-	-	-	-	-	-	-	-	5	5	-	-
24	Desiré Wilson	South Africa	?	10	6	-	-	-	-	-	-	-	-	-	-	-	-	-	-	-	-	-	-
	Ian Ashley	United Kingdom	Agapiou Racing	-	-	-	-	-	-	-	-	9	6	-	-	-	-	-	-	-	-	-	-
26	Rich Rutherford	United States	?	12	10	-	-	-	-	-	-	-	-	-	-	-	-	-	-	-	-
26	Rich Rutherford	United States	Ian Gordon Racing																			11	9
27	Guido Daccò	Italy	Agapiou Racing	-	-	-	-	-	-	-	-	-	-	-	-	-	-	-	-	-	-	9	7
28	Jan Thoelke	West Germany	Agapiou Racing	-	-	-	-	-	-	-	-	-	-	-	-	-	-	13	9	-	-	-	-
29	Jack Miller	United States	Agapiou Racing	-	-	-	-	-	-	-	-	-	-	14	R10	-	-	-	-	-	-	-	-
	Bobby Fix	United States	?	-	-	-	-	-	-	-	-	-	-	-	-	-	-	-	-	-	-	12	10
-	Wally Dallenbach Jr.	United States	?	14	R13	-	-	-	-	-	-	-	-	-	-	-	-	-	-	-	-	-	-
-	Ken Johnson	United States	?	-	-	-	-	-	-	-	-	-	-	9	R14	-	-	-	-	-	-	-	-
