= Bren (surname) =

Bren is a surname. Notable people with the surname include:

- Donald Bren (born 1932), American businessman
- Frank Bren (born 1943), Australian actor and playwright
- J. Robert Bren (1903 – 1981), Mexican-American filmmaker
- Llywelyn Bren (died 1318), Welsh rebel
- Steve Bren (born 1960), American racing driver
