= Cary Bren =

American former racing driver

- Born: May 8, 1959 (age 67)
- Occupation: Car Racing
- Parent(s): Diane and Donald Bren
- Family: Marion Newbert Bren (grandmother); Milton H. Bren (grandfather); Steve Bren (brother)(Hunter Bren)

Cary Bren (born 8 May 1959) is an American former racing driver. He is from Santa Ana, California.

Cary took part in the first four races of the 1986 International Formula 3000 season but only raced once, finishing 21st at Silverstone. He is the brother of another racing driver, Steve Bren and one of seven children of businessman Donald Bren.
