= Marios Papaefthymiou =

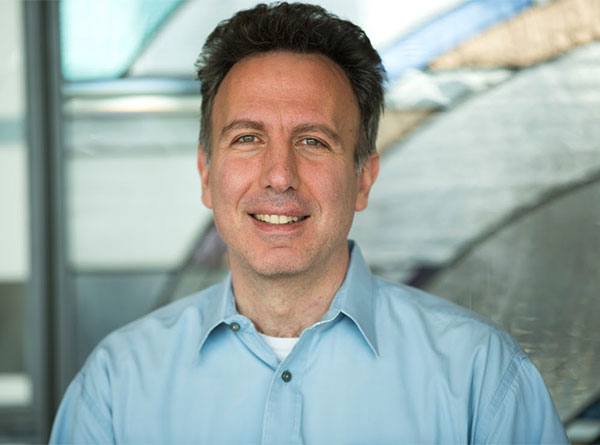
Papaefthymiou is the Ted and Janice Smith Family Foundation dean of the School of ICS at UCI.

Marios Papaefthymiou is the Ted and Janice Smith Family Foundation dean of the Donald Bren School of Information and Computer Sciences at the University of California, Irvine, United States. He previously served as chair of computer science and engineering at the University of Michigan, Ann Arbor, MI. He was named Fellow of the Institute of Electrical and Electronics Engineers (IEEE) in 2014 for contributions to the design of adiabatic circuits for high-performance computing.
