= There Goes My Heart (film) =

1938 film by Norman Z. McLeod

- Directed by: Norman Z. McLeod
- Written by: Ed Sullivan (story); Eddie Moran; Jack Jevne
- Produced by: Milton H. Bren; Hal Roach (uncredited)
- Starring: Fredric March; Virginia Bruce
- Cinematography: Norbert Brodine
- Edited by: William Terhune
- Music by: Marvin Hatley
- Production company: Hal Roach Studios
- Distributed by: United Artists
- Release date: October 14, 1938
- Running time: 81-83 minutes
- Country: United States
- Language: English
- Budget: $1 million
- Box office: $410,700

There Goes My Heart is a 1938 American romantic comedy film starring Virginia Bruce and Fredric March, and directed by Norman Z. McLeod. Bruce plays a wealthy heiress who goes to work under an alias at a department store owned by her grandfather, and March the reporter who tracks her down. The film is based on a story by Ed Sullivan, better known for his long-running Ed Sullivan Show. The film was nominated for a Best Score Oscar for Marvin Hatley.

== Plot ==
Because heiress Joan Butterfield can't convince her grandfather to let her do what normal girls her age do, she decides to sneak away from their yacht and go off on her own in New York City. Reporter Bill Spencer arrives at the yacht just before she leaves, hoping to get a rare photograph of her for his editor, Mr. Stevens, but he is only able to get a glimpse of her. Bill is determined to get his story on Joan and convinces Stevens to let him continue his pursuit. While other papers are trying to find the missing heiress, Bill decides to do a story contrasting her life with that of an ordinary salesgirl in her grandfather's department store. Meanwhile, Joan meets good-hearted Peggy O'Brien in an automat and is able to get herself a free lunch when Peggy's is stolen and the manager refuses to replace it until the well-dressed Joan says that hers was stolen as well. The girls become friends and Peggy offers to let Joan stay with her, thinking that she is down-on-her-luck. She also promises to get Joan a job in Butterfield's department store, where Peggy works. Because Joan does not want anyone to know who she is, she assumes the name of Joan Baker. She enjoys her new life, even though adapting to everyday situations like cooking dinner prove challenging. When Bill comes into the store to do his feature, he recognizes Joan and, hoping to get a hot story, he pursues her. After first trying to avoid Bill, Joan soon agrees to go out with him, but inadvertently manages to squelch every attempt he makes to photograph her. As he gets to know Joan for the down-to-earth person she really is, Bill begins to fall in love with her. One day, when Joan accidentally leaves her watch in the women's restroom at Butterfield's, Dorothy Moore, a jealous co-worker, sees the inscription, "To Joan Butterfield--from Gramps" and realizes Joan's true identity. While Dorothy goes to Gramps, Peggy agrees to help Joan, even though she can't understand why Joan prefers the life of an ordinary salesgirl to her own. Not knowing that Bill has secretly been working on a story about Joan, Peggy calls him to tell him what has happened and he takes Joan to his island cabin just twenty-five miles from New York. That night, at his cabin, they realize that they are in love and Bill decides to stop Stevens from printing the story about Joan. The next morning, he secretly goes to New York to get some groceries and a marriage license and tears his story up into little pieces. As soon as Bill leaves, however, Stevens calls the entire newsroom staff in to glue the story back together, and before Bill can return to the island, his "exclusive" on a secret romance with Joan is headline news. Gramps then calls the paper and learns from Bill's pal, Flash Fisher, where he has taken Joan. By taking a speed boat, Gramps and his staff arrive at the island before Bill and show Joan the story with Bill's byline. When Bill arrives, Joan is so hurt and angry that she leaves without allowing him to explain. Some time later, Peggy and her chiropractor boyfriend, Pennypepper E. Pennypepper, decide that the best way to get the stubborn pair back together is to send each a telegram signed by the other, asking to meet at the island cabin. When they meet, they are at first reluctant to forgive and forget, but soon realize they are in love when a thunderclap causes the frightened Joan to rush into Bill's arms. Finally, a local minister who was sent to the island by Peggy and Penny enters the cabin at the right moment with his prayer book opened to the wedding ceremony.

== Cast ==
- Fredric March as Bill Spencer
- Virginia Bruce as Joan Butterfield
- Patsy Kelly as Peggy O'Brien
- Alan Mowbray as Pennypepper E. Pennypepper
- Nancy Carroll as Dorothy Moore
- Eugene Pallette as Mr. Stevens
- Claude Gillingwater as Cyrus W. Butterfield
- Arthur Lake as Flash Fisher
- Harry Langdon as Preacher (uncredited)
- Etienne Girardot as Hinkley
- Robert Armstrong as Detective O'Brien
- Irving Bacon as Mr. Dobbs
- Irving Pichel as Mr. Gorman
- Syd Saylor as Robinson (as Sid Saylor)
- J. Farrell MacDonald as Police Officer
- Marjorie Main as Butterfield's customer (uncredited)
- Mary Field as Mrs. Crud (uncredited)
- George Chandler as Tailor (uncredited)
