= Milton H. Bren =

American film producer and businessman (1904–1979)

- Born: June 14, 1904; Los Angeles, California, U.S.
- Died: December 14, 1979 (aged 75); Orange, California, U.S.
- Occupations: movie producer real estate developer
- Spouse(s): Marion Newbert (1930—1948; divorced; 2 sons); Claire Trevor (m. 1948)
- Children: 2, including Donald Bren

Milton H. Bren (June 14, 1904 – December 14, 1979) was a Hollywood movie producer and real estate developer.

== Biography ==
Bren was born in Los Angeles in 1904 to a Jewish family, the son of Sadie (née Simon) and Harry Bren. He first worked as a talent agent. In 1937, he accepted a job at Hal Roach Studios as an associate producer where he produced the film Topper, the studio's first feature film, which was wildly successful. In 1938, he was elevated to producer. In March 1939, he accepted a job at Metro-Goldwyn-Mayer as a producer eventually becoming an Executive Vice President. From 1939–1940 he maintained a home in Palm Springs, California. He later served in the United States Navy during World War II as a lieutenant commander.

Milton Bren later became a real estate developer known for developing part of Sunset Strip.

== Select filmography ==
- Topper (1937) – associate producer
- Merrily We Live (1938) – producer
- Swiss Miss (1938) – production supervisor (uncredited)
- There Goes My Heart (1938) – producer
- Topper Takes a Trip (1938) – producer
- Remember? (1939) – producer
- Wyoming (1940) – producer
- Free and Easy (1941) – producer (uncredited)
- Barnacle Bill (1941) – producer
- Tars and Spars (1946) – producer
- Borderline (1950) – producer and presenter
- Three for Bedroom "C" (1952) – Writer and director

== Personal life ==
In 1930, at age 27, Bren married 18-year-old Marion Newbert who was of partial Irish descent. They divorced in 1948. (Newbert remarried in 1953 to steel businessman Earle M. Jorgensen and became a prominent philanthropist). They had two sons: Donald, who became chairman of the Irvine Company in Newport Beach, California, and Peter, chairman of KBS Realty Advisors, Inc. in New York City at the time of his death in 2019.

In 1948, Bren remarried, to Academy Award-winning actress Claire Trevor; they remained married until his death. Bren's grandson, Steve, is a former professional auto racing driver.

== Death ==
Milton Bren died on December 14, 1979, aged 75, in Orange, California from a brain tumor.
