= Tiffany Lopez =

American administrator

- Born: Tiffany Ana López
- Education: California State University, Sacramento (BA) University of California, Santa Barbara (PhD)
- Occupations: Artist, Academic, Administrator
- Employer: Claire Trevor School of the Arts
- Known for: Diversity, Equity, Inclusion, Theatre Studies, Claire Trevor Endowment for the Dean
- Notable work: Growing up Chicana/o (Editor, 1993)
- Title: Dean
- Awards: Arizona's 48 Most Intriguing Women Nominee (2022), ASU Faculty Women's Association Outstanding Faculty Mentor award (2019), Hispanic Lifestyle Latina of Influence (2015), Fulbright Scholar (2004)

Tiffany Ana López is an American academic and administrator who serves as the dean of the Claire Trevor School of the Arts at the University of California, Irvine. Her work focuses on storytelling in relation to trauma, violence, and creativity's role in fostering personal transformation and social change.

== Early life ==
At 15, Lopez started working in a fast-food restaurant and was involved in the arts. Exposure to the arts, including attendance at classical music concerts and participation in public arts programs, played a role in shaping her perspective on life and storytelling. These experiences contributed to her subsequent career choices in academia and arts administration.

López is a first-generation college student. She earned her B.A. from California State University, Sacramento, after transferring from the California community college. She then obtained her M.A. and Ph.D. from the University of California, Santa Barbara.

== Career ==
López began her academic career in the California Community College system and later pursued a master's and PhD in English as a Fulbright scholar. She went to Dartmouth while completing her dissertation. López spent 21 years teaching at the University of California, Riverside. She led Latinx initiatives, programming, and community engagement as the Tomás Rivera Endowed Chair in the College of Humanities, Arts, and Social Sciences. She also collaborated on a National Endowment for the Humanities (NEH) grant on medical narratives and graphic medicine.

López holds the Endowed Chair "Claire Trevor Endowment for the Dean".

Immediately prior to her role at UCI, López served as the vice provost for inclusive excellence and the director of the School of Film, Dance and Theater at the Herberger Institute for Design and the Arts (HIDA) at Arizona State University (ASU). During her tenure, the film program saw expansion and diversification in its curriculum, faculty, and student body, and underwent preparations for its rebranding as the Sidney Poitier New American Film School.

== Work ==
López's research and professional work focus on the intersections of theater, trauma, and violence. She has worked with regional theaters, including Center Theatre Group and Oregon Shakespeare Festival. She has also been published in several books and journals, including "Encuentro – Latinx Performance for the New American Theater" (2019), "The Cambridge Guide to U.S. Latina/o Literature" (2016), "Performing the U.S. Latina and Latino Borderlands" (2011), and "Growing up Chicana/o" (1993).

She has collaborated with theater companies, regional theaters and festivals, such as the Southwest Shakespeare Company, Oregon Shakespeare Festival, and Artists Repertory Theatre. Selected recent production dramaturgy includes "La Ruta" by Isaac Gomez and "Mother Road" by Octavio Solis. López is also the founding director of the Latina/o Play Project and a founding member of several theater organizations.

She wrote an essay titled "Struggles of Chicanas/Latinas in Academia", which discusses the difficulties Chicanas/Latinas encounter in academic environments, focusing on issues like sexism, homophobia, and racism. Her essay delves into the challenges faced by Chicanas/Latinas in academic settings, highlighting systemic issues such as institutionalized sexism, homophobia, and racism. This work serves as a resource for those looking to address the slow the progress of Chicanas/Latinas in academia.

== Selected publications ==
- Growing up Chicana/o: an anthology (1. ed.). New York, N.Y: William Morrow. 1993. ISBN 0-688-11467-9.
- López, Tiffany Ana (2006). "SPEAKING FRANKLY, DOCUMENTING STRUGGLE: Chicanas/Latinas in Academia". Chicana/Latina Studies. 6 (1): 132–136. ISSN 1550-2546. JSTOR 23014589.
- López, Tiffany Ana (2010). "Traumaturgy". Science Fiction Studies. 37 (1): 134–136. ISSN 0091-7729. JSTOR 40649599.
- López, Tiffany Ana (2012). "EDITOR'S COMMENTARY: Conclusion of Service: Reflecting on Seven Years of Collaborative Work in Chicana/Latina Feminist Editorial Practice". Chicana/Latina Studies. 11 (2): 26–37. ISSN 1550-2546. JSTOR 23345341.

== Awards and recognition ==
López's work has been recognized with various awards and fellowships, such as a nomination for Arizona's 48 Most Intriguing Women (2022), an ASU Faculty Women's Association Outstanding Faculty Mentor award (2019), a Hispanic Lifestyle Latina of Influence (2015), and a Fulbright Scholar (2004). Her work has been supported by grants from the Mellon Foundation, National Endowment for the Humanities, National Endowment for the Arts, and Rockefeller Foundation.
