= Claire Trevor School of the Arts =

Art school of UC Irvine

Coordinates: 33.6497°N 117.845°W

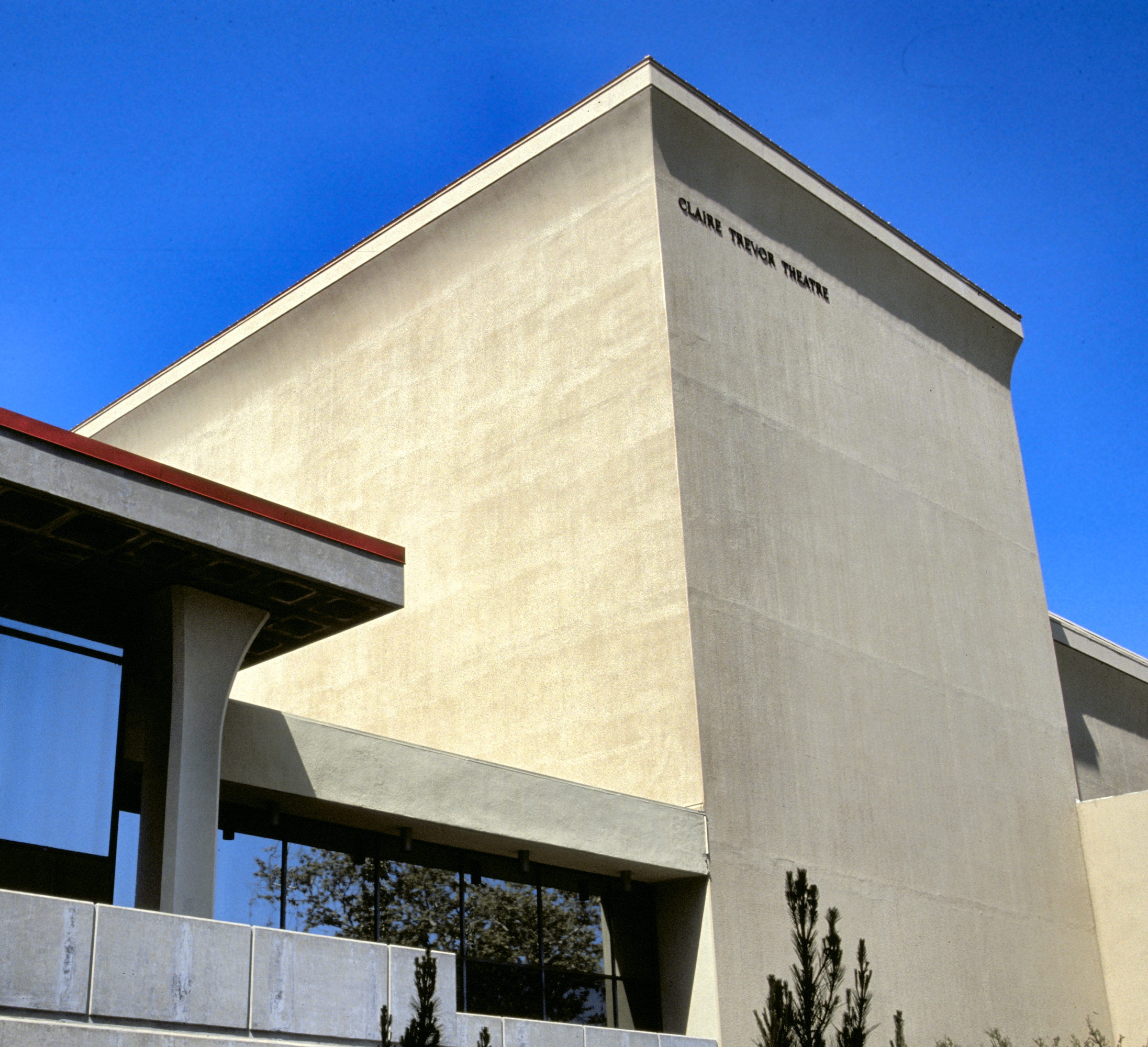
- Claire Trevor Theater and related structure

General information
- Architectural style: Brutalist
- Location: Irvine, California, United States of America
- Construction started: 1969
- Completed: 1970
- Client: University of California, Irvine

Technical details
- Structural system: Reinforced concrete

Design and construction
- Architect: William Pereira
- Structural engineer: Brandow & Johnston

Website
- Official website

The Claire Trevor School of the Arts (CTSA, Claire Trevor) is an academic unit at the University of California, Irvine, focused on the performing and visual arts. The four departments housed in the school are for art, dance, drama, and music. CTSA has undergraduate programs, masters programs, and a doctoral program in drama conducted jointly with UC San Diego.

== Architecture and history ==
The school was named in honor of Academy Award-winning Hollywood actress Claire Trevor (1910–2000), a longtime resident of nearby Newport Beach and the stepmother of UCI benefactor Donald Bren. The school represents the largest contribution to the campus by architect William Pereira, who oversaw its construction in 1970. It features a distinctive "modular" design in which individual buildings are connected by an overhead network of pillar-supported canopies. Early architectural sketches showed a design incorporating a lattice of broadly curved columns around the buildings, this was ultimately simplified into the flared solid forms of the buildings themselves. In 2005, the school's landscape was redesigned by Maya Lin in a retro-futuristic style, featuring an outdoor theater, fountains, decorative LED lighting and landscaping with native grasses and wildflowers. In fall 2011, the new "green" Contemporary Arts Center opened in the heart of the school, a $42.35-million building equipped with studios and spaces for displaying, staging, and producing art. It serves as the new anchor for the art school complex.

== Departments and faculty ==
=== Art department ===
Founded under the name Studio Art, the department renamed itself in 2012. It teaches a wide range of contemporary media, including drawing, electronic art and design, new genres, painting, performance, photography, sculpture, and video and digital filmmaking. The department has around 20 full-time faculty members and accepts about 10 graduate students each year into its three-year M.F.A. program.

=== Dance department ===
The UCI Dance department teaches ballet, modern dance, improvisation, and jazz performance and choreography, as well as courses in the history of dance, dance medicine and science, and the integration of dance with interactive technologies such as motion capture and telematics.

=== Drama department ===
Robert Cohen organized an undergraduate repertory company that took Oedipus Rex on the road to UC San Diego and UC Santa Cruz in the department's early years. Other early productions included The Assassination of Jean Paul Marat by the Marquis de Sade, "Little Mary Sunshine", Night of the Iguana and Midsummer Night's Dream. William Inge, author of such plays as Bus Stop, Picnic, and The Dark at the Top of the Stairs taught playwriting in the drama department in the 1970s. Jerzy Grotowski, acting theorist and founder of the Polish Laboratory Theater, joined the drama faculty in 1983, and conducted his Objective Drama project in the fields and barn south of the main campus.

=== Music department ===
The Music department offers both a B.A. and a B.Mus at the undergraduate level, as well as a two-year M.F.A. degree program. Emphases at the Master's level include choral conducting, collaborative piano, guitar/lute performance, instrumental and piano performance, and vocal arts. There is also a Ph.D. degree in Integrated Composition, Improvisation, and Technology (ICIT) and Musicology.

=== Deans ===
The current dean of the Claire Trevor School of the Arts is Tiffany Ana López. López is a professor of dramaturgy and, as dean, she holds the Claire Trevor Professor endowed chair in CTSA.

- Clayton Garrison (1964-1982)
- William C. Holmes (1982-1983)
- Robert Garfias (1983-1987)
- Bernard Gilmore (1987-1989)
- Robert Hickok (1989-1994)
- Robert Cohen (1994-1995 acting dean)
- Jill Beck (1995-2003)
- Nohema Fernández (2003-2008)
- Alan Terricciano (2008-2010 acting dean)
- Joseph S. Lewis III (2010-2014)
- Stephen Barker, Ph.D. (2014-2022)
- Tiffany Ana López, Ph.D. (2022-present)

== Notable alumni ==
- Chris Burden, American sculptor and conceptual performance artist known for using his body in his artworks including Shoot, in which an assistant shot him in the arm.
- Nancy Buchanan, American installation, performance, and video artist key figure in the Feminist Movement.
- Russell Crotty, American visual artist known for his sculptural installations of suspended globes with drawings and large-scale books.
- Crista Flanagan, a regular on Mad TV, a recipient of an MFA degree from the Claire Trevor School
- Bob Gunton, Drama Desk Award-winning actor on stage and screen
- Glenn Kaino, American conceptual artist based in Los Angeles
- Kevin Kwan Loucks, CEO of Chamber Music America; co-founder of Chamber Music OC; member of classical music ensemble Trio Céleste
- Jon Lovitz, American comedian and actor
- Beth Malone, American Tony Award-nominated stage actress, a performer at the Public Theater, New York, and the Sundance Theater Lab in Utah
- Barbara T. Smith, American artist known for her performance, and installation work, part of the Feminist Movement.
- Brian Thompson, American actor, known for his work in action films and TV series
- Teal Wicks, American stage actor, known for her role as Elphaba in the Broadway and touring productions of Wicked. Teal was Sheila in the 2003 version of Hair on the Claire Trevor stage.

== Links ==
- Official website
