= Bren Hall =

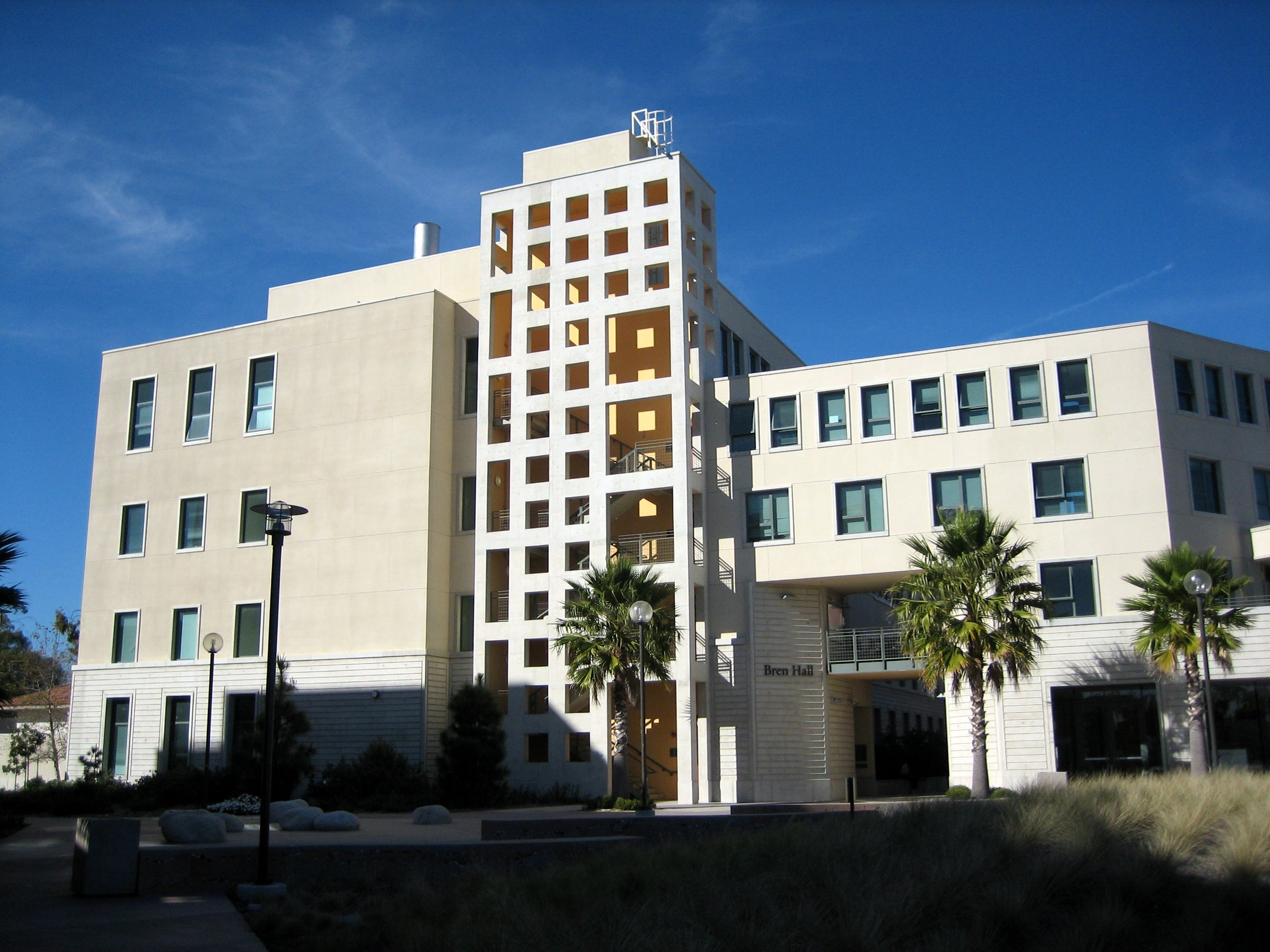

General information
- Location: Santa Barbara, California, United States
- Coordinates: 34°24′43.61″N 119°50′31.25″W
- Completed: April 2002
- Cost: $26 Million
- Client: University of California, Santa Barbara

Design and construction
- Architect: Zimmer Gunsul Frasca

Bren Hall, opened in April 2002, is located on the campus of University of California, Santa Barbara, located in Santa Barbara, California. It is named in honor of philanthropist Donald Bren and hosts the university's Bren School of Environmental Science & Management. The building has a view of Santa Barbara Channel and the Channel Islands. It has been called the "greenest" laboratory facility in the United States.

== Construction ==
Bren Hall's original location was a parking lot. All of the waste was recycled and used in the construction or elsewhere on campus. Developers designed the building to conserve power by using energy-efficient lighting, natural lighting, efficient boilers, connection to the campus's chilled water loop, and a sophisticated building automation system. Many of the furnishings—including the carpet, insulation, counters, and furniture—were made from recycled materials. All water fixtures are highly efficient, including waterless urinals and low-flow, self-closing faucets. Reclaimed water is used in the toilets and for irrigation purposes. Offices on the side of the ocean are cooled by ventilation system of air from operable windows.

== Platinum rating ==
The United States Green Building Council gave Bren Hall one of its first Platinum ratings under LEED 1.0's New Construction category. On August 4, 2009, it was announced that Bren Hall had become the first building in the nation to receive a second Platinum award, this time in the category Existing Buildings –– Operations & Maintenance.

== 2010 ceiling collapse ==
On October 30, 2010, a two-ton piece of the ceiling collapsed into the building lobby. The building was evacuated, and all suspended ceilings (some of which were also found to be coming loose) were removed before the building reopened after several days. The University later reported that defective ceiling suspension anchors were at fault, and said there was no connection between the ceiling problems and the building's sustainable design.
