= UC Santa Barbara Bren School of Environmental Science and Management =

Graduate professional school at the University of California, Santa Barbara

- Established: 1991
- Dean: Steve Gaines
- Location: Santa Barbara, California, United States
- Website: bren.ucsb.edu

The UC Santa Barbara Bren School of Environmental Science and Management is the graduate environmental studies school of the University of California, Santa Barbara.

The mission of the Bren School is to play a leading role in researching environmental issues, identifying and solving environmental problems, and training research scientists and environmental-management professionals.

== History ==
In 1991, recognizing the need for a graduate school dedicated to the study of the environment, the Regents of the University of California established the School of Environmental Science and Management at UC Santa Barbara.

In 1994, Jeff Dozier became the school's first dean. In 1995, the first faculty were appointed, and in 1996 the first master's students were admitted, receiving their degrees in 1998. In 2000, the first PhD students were admitted. The first PhD degrees were awarded in 2002.

In 1997, the school received a US$15 million gift from the Donald Bren Foundation and was renamed the Bren School of Environmental Science and Management.

In 2002, Bren Hall was completed, providing the school with the facilities and the physical focus it retains to this day.

In 2020, the Bren School launched the Master of Environmental Data Science program and admitted the first cohort of MEDS students in September 2021.

== Degree programs ==
The Bren School offers Master of Environmental Data Science (MEDS), Master of Environmental Science & Management (MESM), and Doctor of Philosophy (PhD) degrees.

=== Master of Environmental Data Science ===
The Bren School's Master of Environmental Data Science (MEDS) degree is an 11-month program focused on using data science to advance solutions to environmental problems.

Students complete a capstone project during their last two quarters of the program. Students collaborate with real-world clients—which may be internal clients (Bren School faculty, other UCSB researchers) or outside clients from industry, government, or non-government organizations–in teams of 3–4 students to build real world experience and skills to solve environmental problems using data science.

=== Master of Environmental Science & Management ===
The Bren School's Master of Environmental Science and Management (MESM) degree is a two-year program comparable to the Master of Environmental Management (MEM) degree offered by other schools. The Bren School chose to include "Science" in the name of its degree to emphasize its focus on environmental science.

In addition to the broad training they receive in the core courses, MESM students select one or two specializations to pursue in greater depth. There are seven specializations:

- Coastal Marine Resources Management (CMRM)
- Conservation Planning (CP)
- Corporate Environmental Management (CEM)
- Economics and Politics of the Environment (EPE)
- Energy and Climate (EC)
- Pollution Prevention and Remediation (PPR)
- Water Resources Management (WRM)

In addition to the seven specializations, students may also select an optional focus. The two foci are:

- Environmental Innovation and Entrepreneurship (Innovation)
- Strategic Environmental Communication and Media (SECM)

One notable aspect of the master's program at the Bren School is the group project. The master's thesis for MESM candidates consists of a project, usually proposed by an agency or company having a local, statewide, nationwide, or international presence. Group projects begin during the spring quarter of the first year of study, and culminate in a final presentation to the Bren community, project stakeholders, and local professionals.

=== PhD in Environmental Science & Management ===
The Bren School's PhD program is designed to prepare leaders in Environmental Science & Management. The program is notable for its focus on a wide variety of environmental issues.

== Bren Hall ==
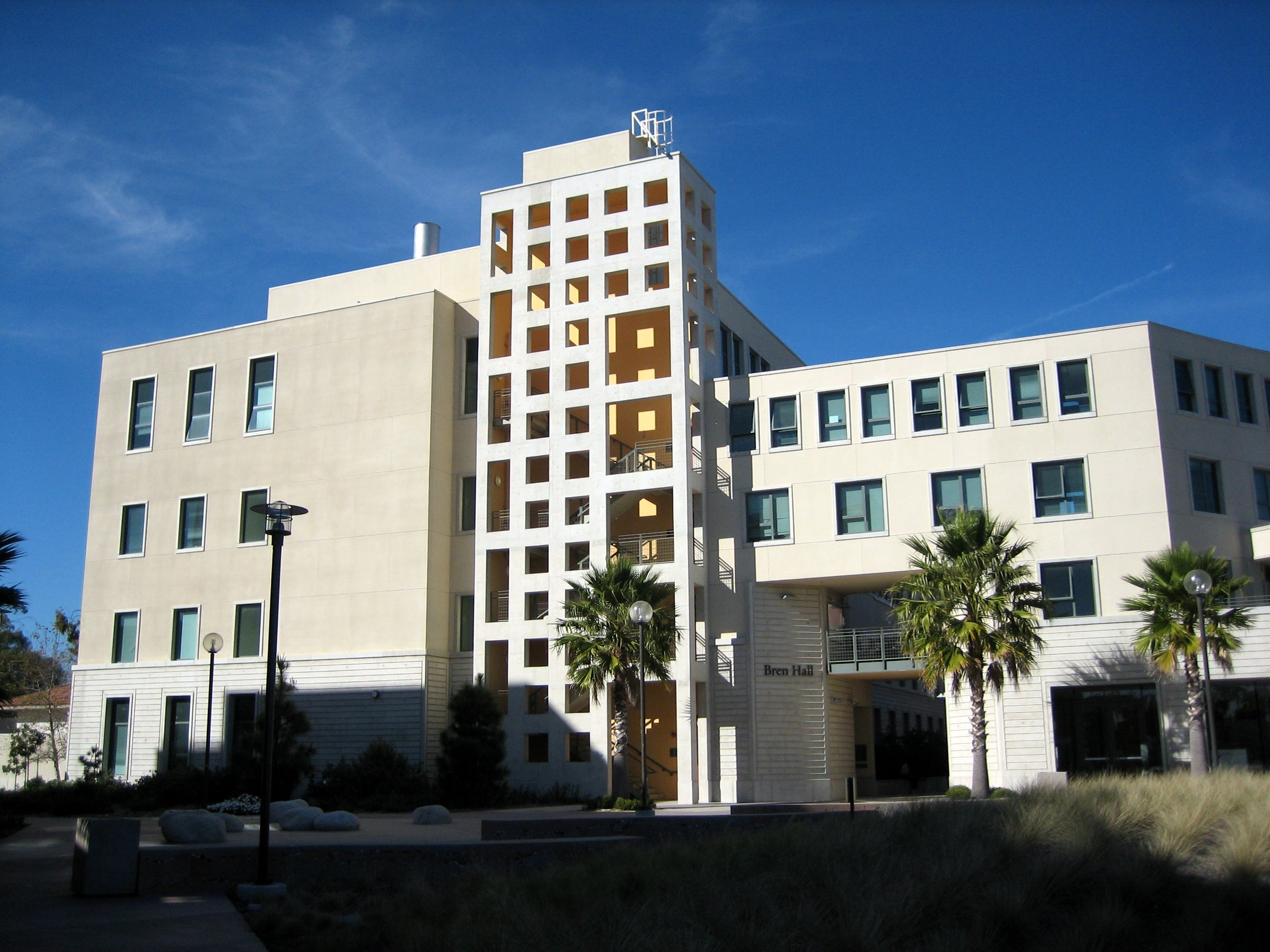
Bren Hall

The school's classrooms, laboratories, and other facilities are located in Bren Hall. Since opening in 2002, Bren Hall has been recognized as an exemplar of sustainable building practices. The building was the first laboratory building in the United States to receive a LEED Platinum certification from the U.S. Green Building Council (USGBC) in 2002. In 2009, the building became the first structure in the nation to receive a second LEED Platinum certification—the LEED for Existing Buildings: Operations & Maintenance.

In 2017, Bren Hall received its third LEED Platinum certification. The building was the highest scoring LEED project in the country.

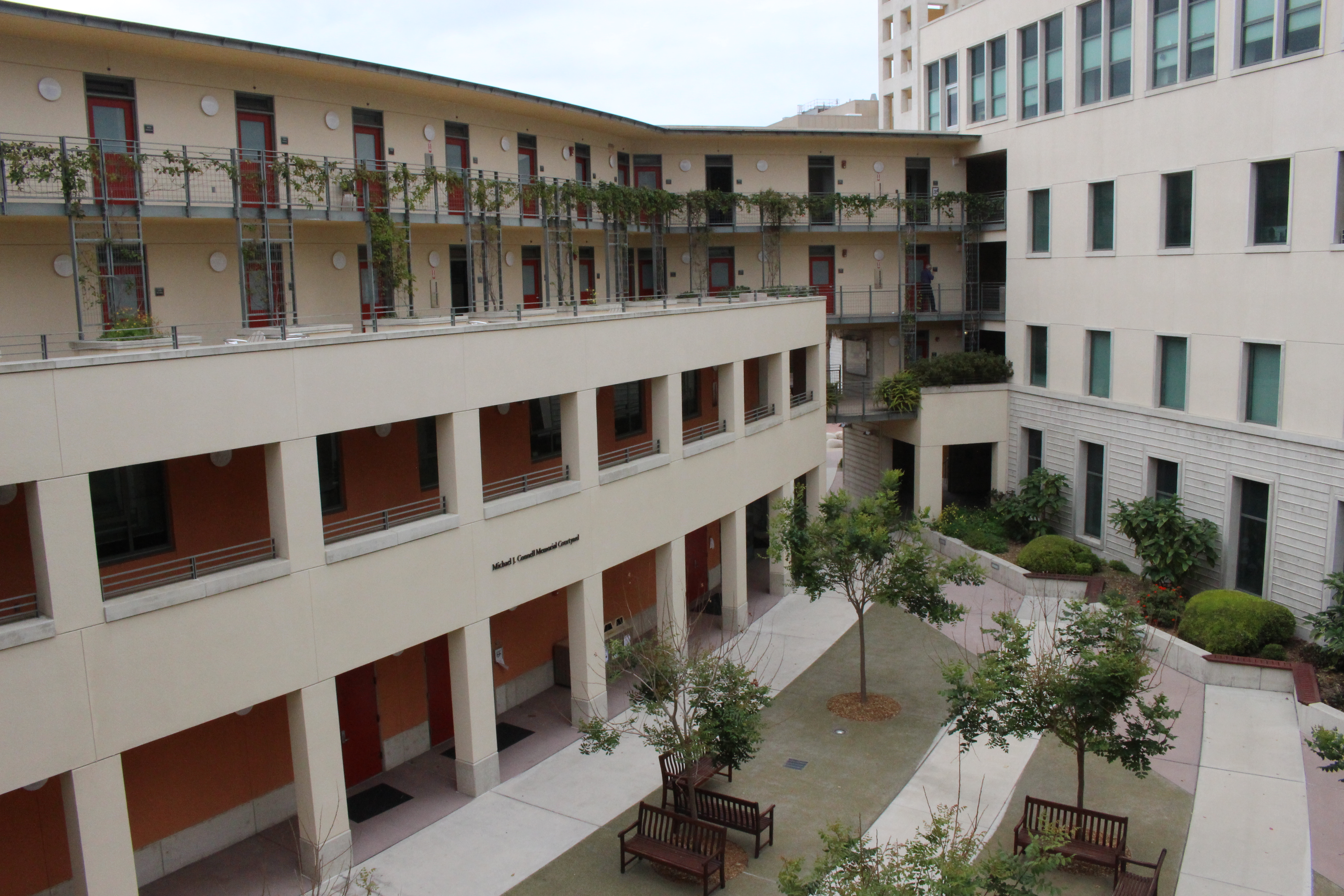
Bren School interior courtyard, UCSB.

== See also ==
- Donald Bren School of Information and Computer Sciences, UC Irvine
