= Donald Bren =

American businessman (born 1932)

- Born: Donald Leroy Bren; May 11, 1932 (age 94); Los Angeles, California, U.S.
- Education: University of Washington (BA)
- Occupations: Chairman of Irvine Company, United States Marine Corps Officer
- Known for: Real estate development
- Spouses: Diane Bren; Mardelle Bren (divorced); Brigitte Muller
- Children: 7
- Parent(s): Marion Newbert; Milton H. Bren
- Website: Official website

Donald Leroy Bren (born May 11, 1932) is an American billionaire businessman. He is the chairman and owner of the Irvine Company, a U.S. real estate development corporation. With a net worth of $19 billion, he ranks number 104 on the 2024 Forbes Billionaires List.

== Early life ==
Bren is the son of Marion Newbert and Milton Bren. His Jewish father Milton was a naval officer, talent agent, and movie producer. His mother Marion, who was of partial Irish descent, was a civic leader. Following their divorce in 1948, Bren's father remarried Academy Award-winning actress Claire Trevor in the same year. His mother later got remarried to steel businessman Earle M. Jorgensen in 1953.

Bren graduated with a bachelor's degree in business administration and economics from the University of Washington. While at the University of Washington, Bren became a member of the Beta Theta Pi fraternity. He failed to qualify for the 1956 Olympic ski team following an injury. After college, he served as an officer in the United States Marine Corps.

== Career ==
Bren founded the Bren Company in 1958 to build homes, later expanding into commercial properties. In 1963, he co-founded the Mission Viejo Company (MVC), which purchased 10,000 acres to develop the city of Mission Viejo, California. He was President of MVC from 1963 to 1967. International Paper purchased the Bren Co. for $34 million in 1970. They sold it back to Bren for $22 million in 1972 due to the recession.

In 1977, Bren joined a group of investors to purchase the 146-year-old Irvine Company. In 1983 he was elected chairman of the board and by 1996 had completed a full buyout, becoming the sole owner.

OC Weekly wrote in 2005 that Bren "wields more power than Howard Hughes ever did, probably as much as any man in America over a concentrated region—determining not only how people live and shop but who governs them." In 2006, the Los Angeles Times wrote "[s]imply put, Orange County looks like Orange County...because of the influence of [Donald Bren]." In a 2011 interview, Bren summarized his real estate investment strategy: "What I learned was that when you hold property over the long term, you're able to create better values and you have something tangible to show for it." Forbes, in its 2019 edition of "The 400 Richest Americans", ranked Bren as the wealthiest real estate developer in the US and 32nd "Richest American" with an estimated net worth of $17 billion.

It is believed that the Irvine Company owns more than 120 million square feet of real estate – the majority of which is in Southern California. The company's holdings include several hotels, marinas, golf courses, 550 office buildings, 125 apartment complexes and more than 40 shopping centers. He currently also owns a 97% stake in the MetLife Building in Manhattan.

== Philanthropy ==
In 2008, BusinessWeek named Bren one of the top ten philanthropists in the nation. His contributions to various causes such as education, conservation and research exceeded $1 billion. In 2023, his lifetime contributions reached $2.1 billion.

Bren was honored in the 2010 National Philanthropy Day of Orange County with the "Donald Bren Legacy of Giving Award". At that time, he said, "I do try to bring the same level of attention to both my philanthropic and business ventures."

In April 2025, the Donald Bren Foundation and the Irvine Company contributed $2 million to the Irvine Unified School District's Excellence in Education Enrichment Fund, part of 20-year, $50 million commitment for elementary students. This marked the 19th consecutive annual gift under the program.

=== Education ===
Bren has donated over $200 million to support programs in K-12 public schools and higher education institutions in Southern California.

His contributions have benefited the University of California, Irvine, University of California, Santa Barbara, and Chapman University. The University of California recognised that Bren "has contributed more to support endowed chairs than any other single donor in UC's history." He had done so privately and through the Donald Bren Charitable Trust. At UC Irvine, his patronage was honored with the naming of the Bren Events Center, Donald Bren School of Information and Computer Sciences and Donald Bren Hall after him. Its Claire Trevor School of the Arts was named after his stepmother. UC Santa Barbara named Bren Hall and the Bren School of Environmental Science & Management, a graduate school, after him in recognition of his donation to "enhance and strengthen the school's core interdisciplinary programs, personnel, and special activities." UC Santa Barbara Chancellor Henry T. Yang said, "Bren's vision for developing a peerless, world-leading institution offering an interdisciplinary program of environmental science, management, and policy has been a tremendous source of inspiration and leadership for the Bren School."

In August 2007, Bren pledged $20 million to the recently established UC Irvine School of Law. The purpose was to establish an endowment to help recruit and support a nationally recognized dean and 11 distinguished law scholars, and provide the dean with discretionary start-up funding. In recognition of the gift, the school was initially named the UC Irvine Donald Bren School of Law. In 2008, it was agreed that the school would no longer bear his name to be similar or parallel to other UC schools.

As a trustee at the California Institute of Technology, Bren supported new faculty as Bren Scholars and endowed five Bren Professorships.

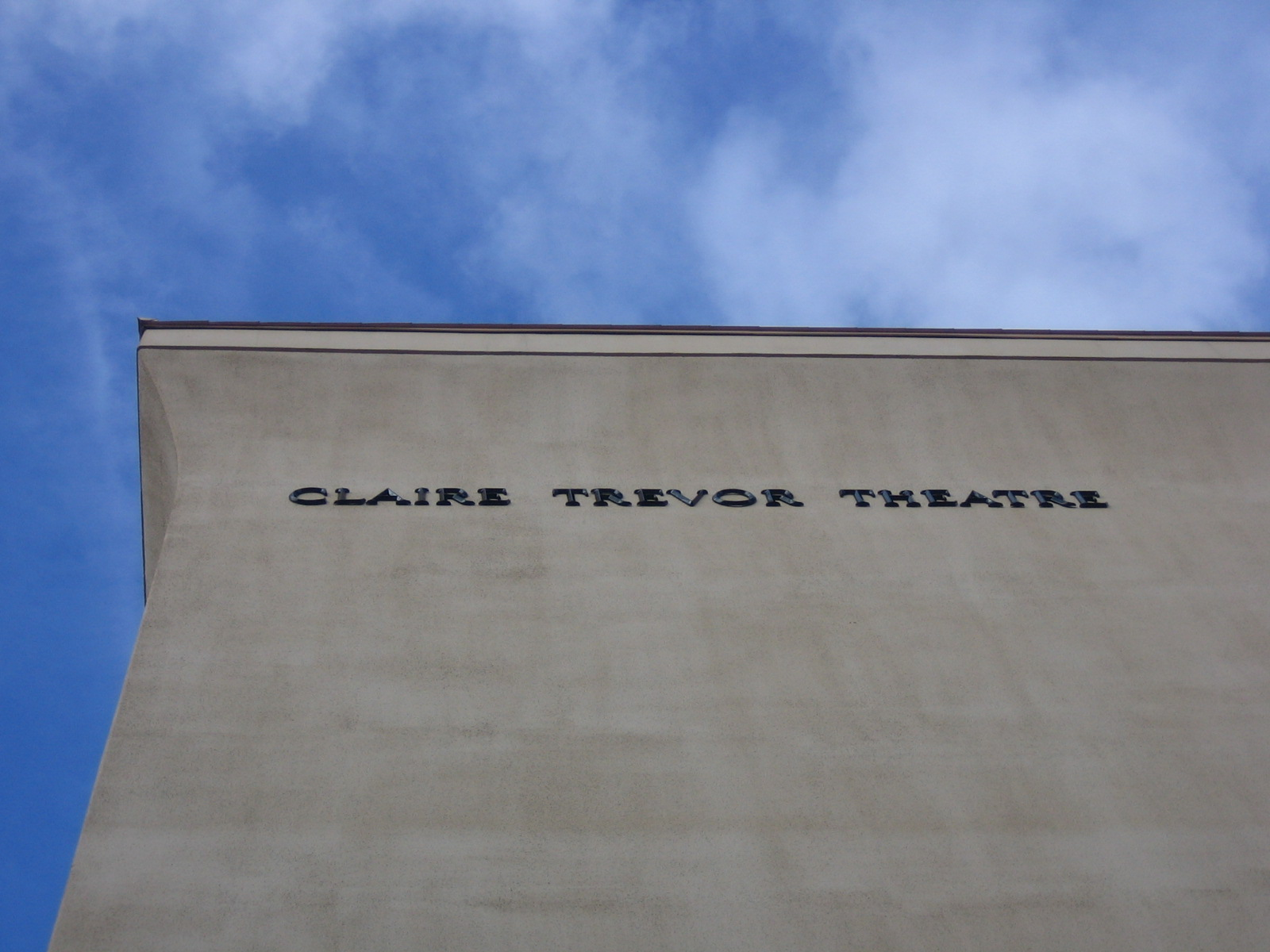
Claire Trevor Theatre, UC Irvine

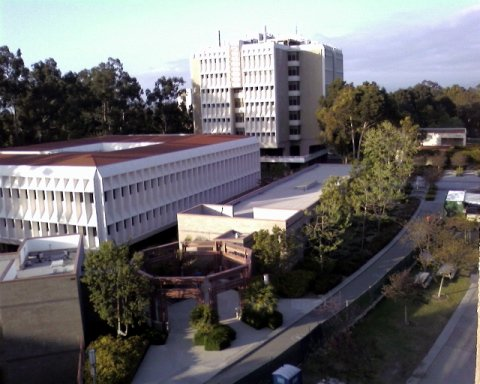
The Donald Bren School of Information and Computer Sciences viewed from the top of Donald Bren Hall, UC Irvine

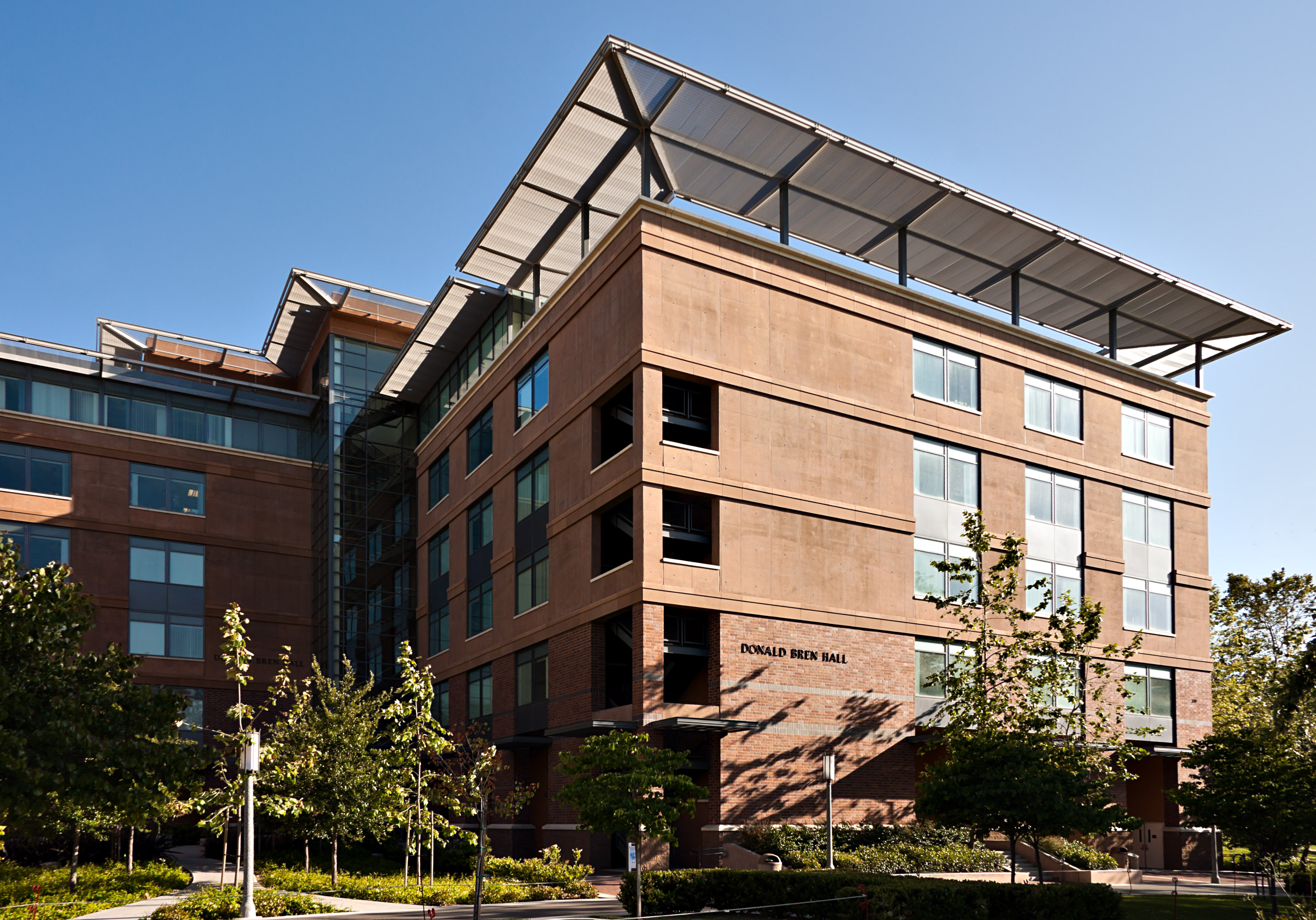
Donald Bren Hall, UC Irvine

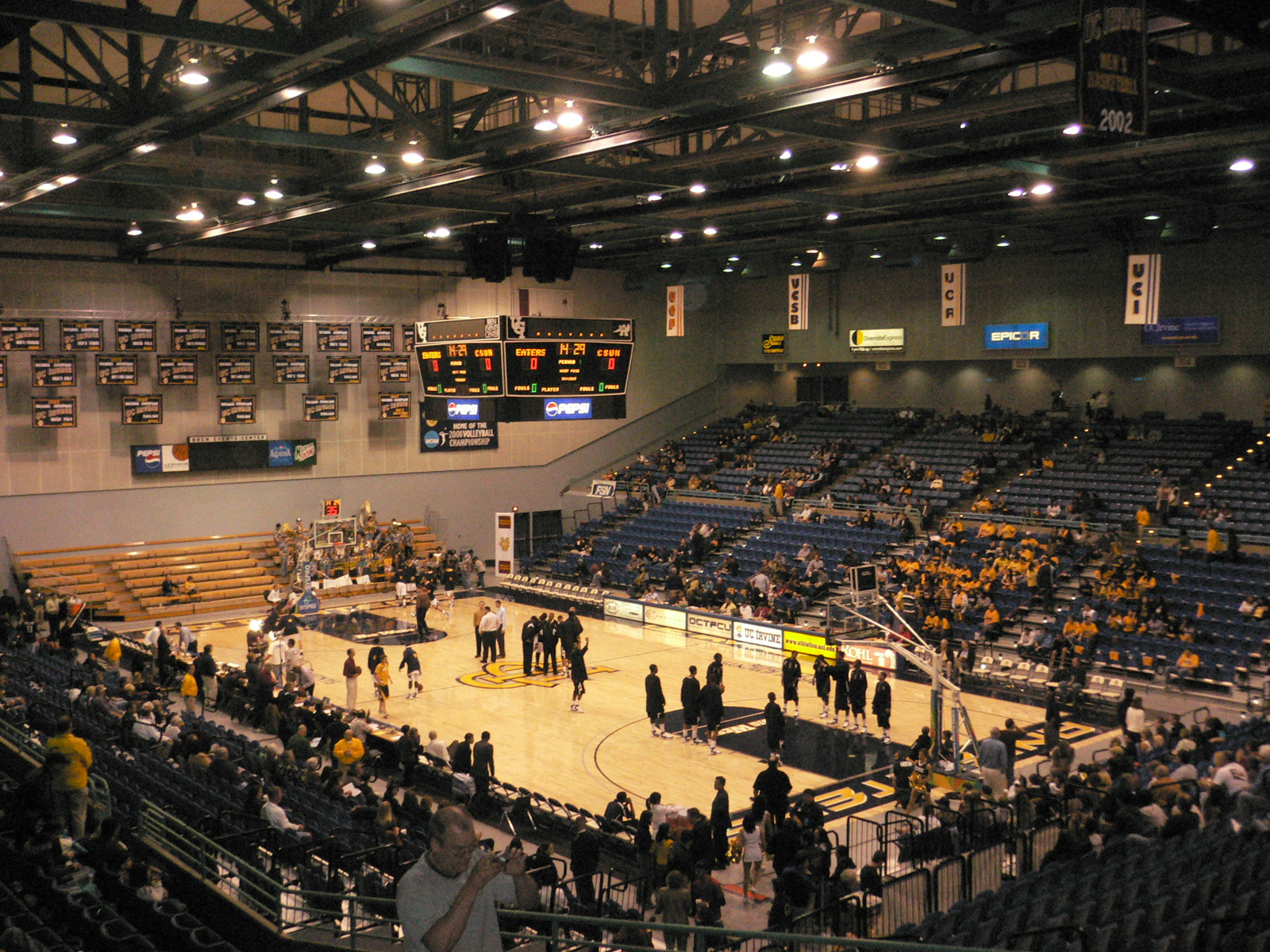
Basketball court of the Bren Events Center before a game, UC Irvine

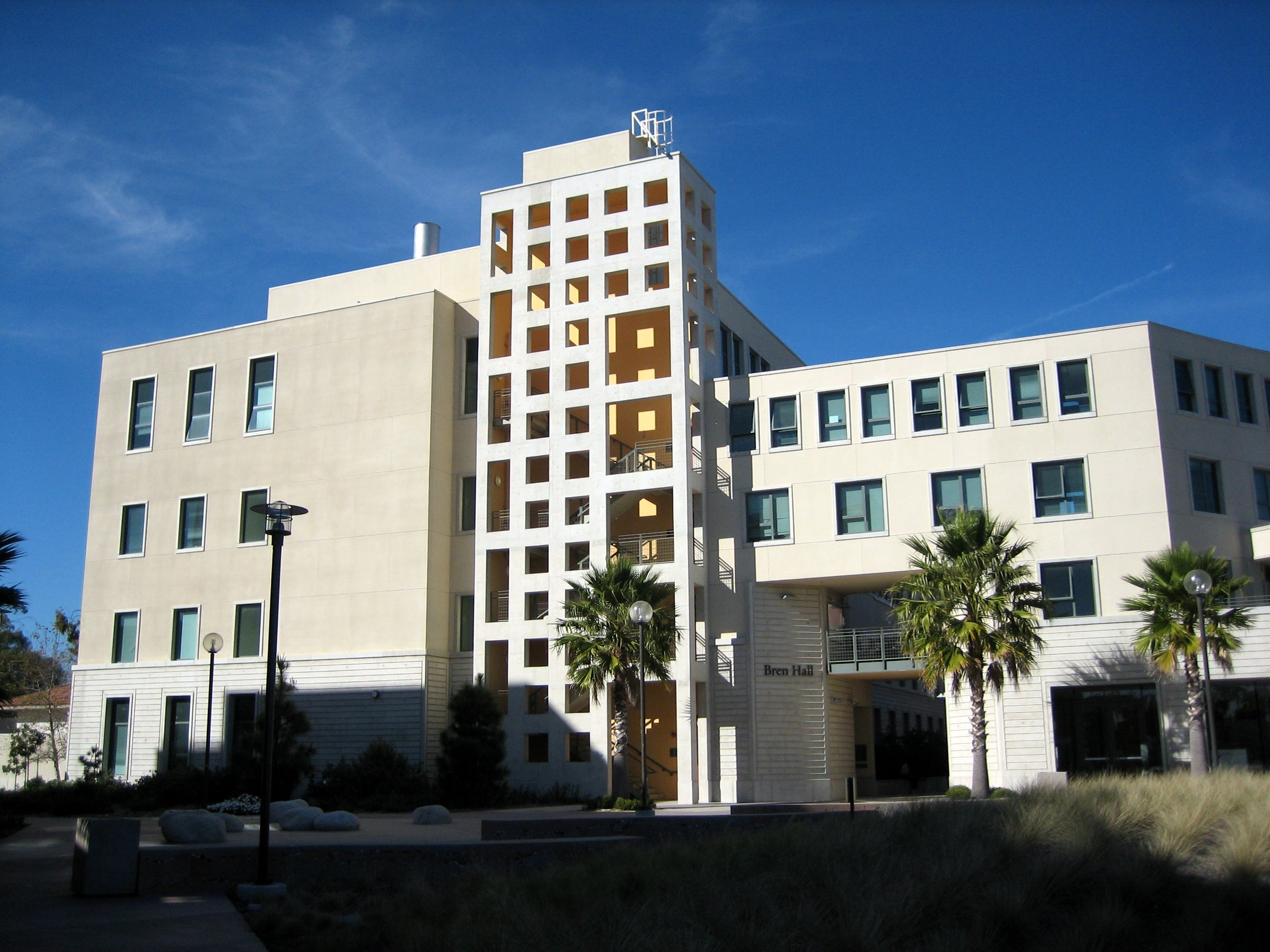
Bren Hall, UC Santa Barbara

In 2003, Bren donated $1 million to the Marine Corps University in Quantico, Virginia. It was used to endow two academic chairs on ethics and leadership, and on innovation and transformation.

Bren also supported after-school services for K-12 students in Southern California through THINK Together. His contribution in 2001 helped the after-school program expand its services to 40 schools in the Santa Ana district. This would benefit more than 10,000 students over 10 years.

Bren donated $25 million in 2000 and $20 million in 2006 to the Irvine Unified School District. Tim Shaw, former chief executive officer of the Irvine Public Schools Foundation, commented that the gift "seeded the strong public support of elementary arts, music and science instruction." In 2024, the Donald Bren Foundation contributed a $2 million gift to the Irvine Unified School District as part of a broader $50 million commitment over 20 years.

=== Conservation ===
The Sunday Times ranked Bren as 9th in its "Green Rich List" in March 2009. This lists the 100 wealthiest people, who have either invested in green technology/business or made large contributions to environmental causes. It was due to his $20 million in donations to UC Santa Barbara's School of Environmental Science.

In 30 years, Bren donated 55,000 acres (220 km^{2}) of land for parks, greenways, recreation and wilderness preserves. This fulfills his plans and commitment to preserve more than 50-percent of historic Irvine Ranch of 93,000 acres (380 km^{2}). 40,000 acres (160 km^{2}) of it were designated as the Irvine Ranch National Natural Landmark. During the 2006 ceremony at Crystal Cove State Park to celebrate this, California Governor Arnold Schwarzenegger said, "it is really a spectacular gift that [Bren's] given to [California]. Donald Bren is...the ultimate of generosity. Not only what he contributes to the environment, but what he contributes continuously to the community, if it is in education, if it is in arts, if it is music, if it is the environment, the tens of millions of dollars he's invested in the environment, to protect the environment. He's an extraordinary man."

In 2008, the state of California also designated the land as the first California Natural Landmark because of the land's ecological value. The protected land, once a part of Irvine Ranch, is operated by The Irvine Ranch Conservancy. In June 2010, Bren completed his pledge to set aside more than 50,000 acres (202.3km2) of the original 93,000-acre ranch as open space by designating 20,000 acres (81 km2) to Orange County, California, as an open-space and parklands gift. This was the largest donation of private property to public ownership in Orange County history. That year, he was recognized for donating more than 20,000 acres of pristine wilderness to Orange County, asking only that it remain open space forever. In August 2014, the Irvine Company announced plans to donate and preserve 2,500 additional acres of land previously approved for housing, bringing the preserved lands of the Irvine Ranch to 60%.

Gale Norton, former U.S. Secretary of the Interior, speaking about Bren's history of land donations, said, "The Irvine Ranch illustrates what cooperative conservation is all about. A conservation-minded corporate citizen is working hand-in-hand with federal and state agencies, The Nature Conservancy, local communities, private citizens and other partners to thoughtfully and purposefully create an environment where both people and wildlife can thrive."

=== Research ===
In 2007, Bren made a $2.5 million commitment to the Burnham Institute for Medical Research in La Jolla, California. The contribution established The Donald Bren Presidential Chair and the money donated was used to support research conducted by the Institute such as cancer, neurodegeneration, diabetes, and childhood diseases among others.

In a 2011 interview, Bren indicated that solar energy is one of the areas he is exploring for a future philanthropic gift. He said, "It's my view that solar energy may be the ultimate solution for energy for most of the world. I believe, based on what little I know about it, that there is a possibility of a breakthrough."

== Awards and honours ==
In 2006 the Los Angeles Times named Bren as both the most powerful and wealthiest person in Southern California, and the Orange County Business Journal named him "Businessperson of the Year" based on the company's office expansion, new building construction, and Bren being recognized for his conservation efforts by the federal government. In 2011 the Urban Land Institute awarded Bren its first Vanguard Award, calling him "one of the most consequential developers in American history." In 2014 he was named on OC Register's list of the 100 most influential people in Orange County.

In 2004 Bren received the University of California Presidential Medal, the University's highest honor, because of his financial support throughout the years which at the time was more than $43 million. During the award ceremony, former UC President, Robert Dynes said, "[Bren's] passionate philanthropy and commitment to educational excellence have helped strengthen the university."

In 1998, Bren received the Marine Corps University Foundation's Semper Fidelis Award, which recognises a distinguished American leader whose commitment to personal and professional excellence embodies those qualities of leadership and character uniquely associated with the United States Marine Corps. Past award recipients include former President George H.W. Bush and former Secretary of State George P. Schultz. The Foundation also presented Bren with its most prestigious award in 2003, the General Leonard F. Chapman Medallion named in honor of the 24th Commandant of the United States Marine Corps.

Bren serves on the board of trustees at Caltech and the Los Angeles County Museum of Art. He was elected a Fellow with the American Academy of Arts & Sciences in 2007 in the category of Business, Corporate and Philanthropic Leadership.

== Personal life ==
Bren has been married three times. His first marriage was to Diane Bren, and they had three children. His first son, Cary Bren, born 1959, served as president of Orange County home builder California Pacific Homes. His second son, Steve Bren, born 1960, was a former professional auto racing driver and real estate developer.

Bren's second marriage was to Mardelle Bren in 1977. They had one daughter, Ashley Bren, born 1968.

In May 1998, Bren, an Episcopalian, married Brigitte Muller, an entertainment lawyer born in La Jolla, California, in a church ceremony at the All Saints Episcopal Church in Beverly Hills, California. He and his wife reside in Newport Beach, California. They had a son in 2003. Bren also has three children by two former companions.

Bren keeps a low public profile and typically avoids press interviews. OC Weekly described Bren in 2005 as "one of the nation's least public billionaires", who guards his privacy "jealously". The Los Angeles Times that year canceled a pending article discussing how the fictional Caleb Nichol of the popular television show The O.C. was based on Bren, allegedly because the Irvine Company threatened to withdraw advertising. The Times denied the allegation and stated that the story was canceled for timing reasons.

== Politics ==
Bren supported Republican Pete Wilson's Senate and gubernatorial campaigns, and Democrat Dianne Feinstein, whom he calls "a great senator for California."

Since the availability of FEC records in 1980, Donald Bren, has contributed tens of thousands of dollars each year to GOP causes. In May 2016, he made contributions to Donald Trump. Bren has donated at least $135,000 to the California Republican Party.

== Donald Leroy Bren links ==
- Biography at the Irvine Company
- Donald Bren, Chairman of the Board of the Irvine Company
- Biography at UCI's Bren School of Information and Computer Sciences
- Donald Bren: Southern California's richest man in his own words by Los Angeles Times
- The Billionaire’s Town - BusinessWeek
