= Steve Bren =

American racing driver

- Born: Steven Michael Bren; July 29, 1960 (age 65); Newport Beach, California, U.S.
- Occupation: Car Racing | Motocross | Real Estate Development
- Parent(s): Diane and Donald Bren
- Family: Marion Newbert Bren (grandmother); Milton H. Bren (grandfather); Cary Bren (brother)

Steve Bren (born July 29, 1960) is an American former racing driver from Newport Beach, California.

== Early life ==
Bren is the son of Diane and Donald Bren, billionaire and chairman of the US-based real estate investment company, the Irvine Company. His paternal grandfather was Hollywood movie producer Milton H. Bren.

== Career ==
After a fairly successful stint in US Formula Super Vee in 1985, Bren moved to the new American Racing Series (ARS) in 1986. While he only participated in four races, he was competitive in all his ARS starts. That year, he also completed rookie orientation for the Indianapolis 500, but could not find a ride to make a qualification attempt. He made two one-off starts in the CART Championship Car series in 1988 at Laguna Seca Raceway and 1990 at Long Beach, however he failed to finish either race. Steve's brother Cary also drove in Super Vee and Indy Lights.

Bren later became a property developer and art collector.

== Personal life ==
Bren has been married twice. In 1988, he married model Thais Baker in a Roman Catholic ceremony. They subsequently divorced in the 1990s. In July 2010, Bren married Erica Spangler of Honolulu, Hawaii. They have a daughter, Bella Rose Bren, born in Ketchum, Idaho.

In 2017, Bren was in trouble with the law for stalking Spangler in Idaho and also held in contempt of court for failing to appear at a civil case where he allegedly owed creditors over $5 million as part of his real estate developments. Bren said he could not pay because he was in rehab for drug and alcohol addiction.

== Motorsports career results ==
=== American open-wheel racing ===
(key) (Races in bold indicate pole position; races in italics indicate fastest lap.)

==== Indy Car World Series ====
Year	Team	1	2	3	4	5	6	7	8	9	10	11	12	13	14	15	16	Rank	Points	Ref
1988	Arciero Racing	PHX	LBH	INDY	MIL	POR	CLE	TOR	MEA	MCH	POC	MDO	ROA	NAZ	LAG; 17	MIA		40th	0	
1990	Arciero Racing	PHX	LBH; 25	INDY	MIL	DET	POR	CLE	MEA	TOR	MCH	DEN	VAN	MDO	ROA	NAZ	LAG	**42nd**	**0**	
