= Donald Bren School of Information and Computer Sciences =

Information school of the University of California, Irvine

Coordinates: 33.6432°N 117.842°W

UC Irvine Donald Bren School of Information and Computer Sciences
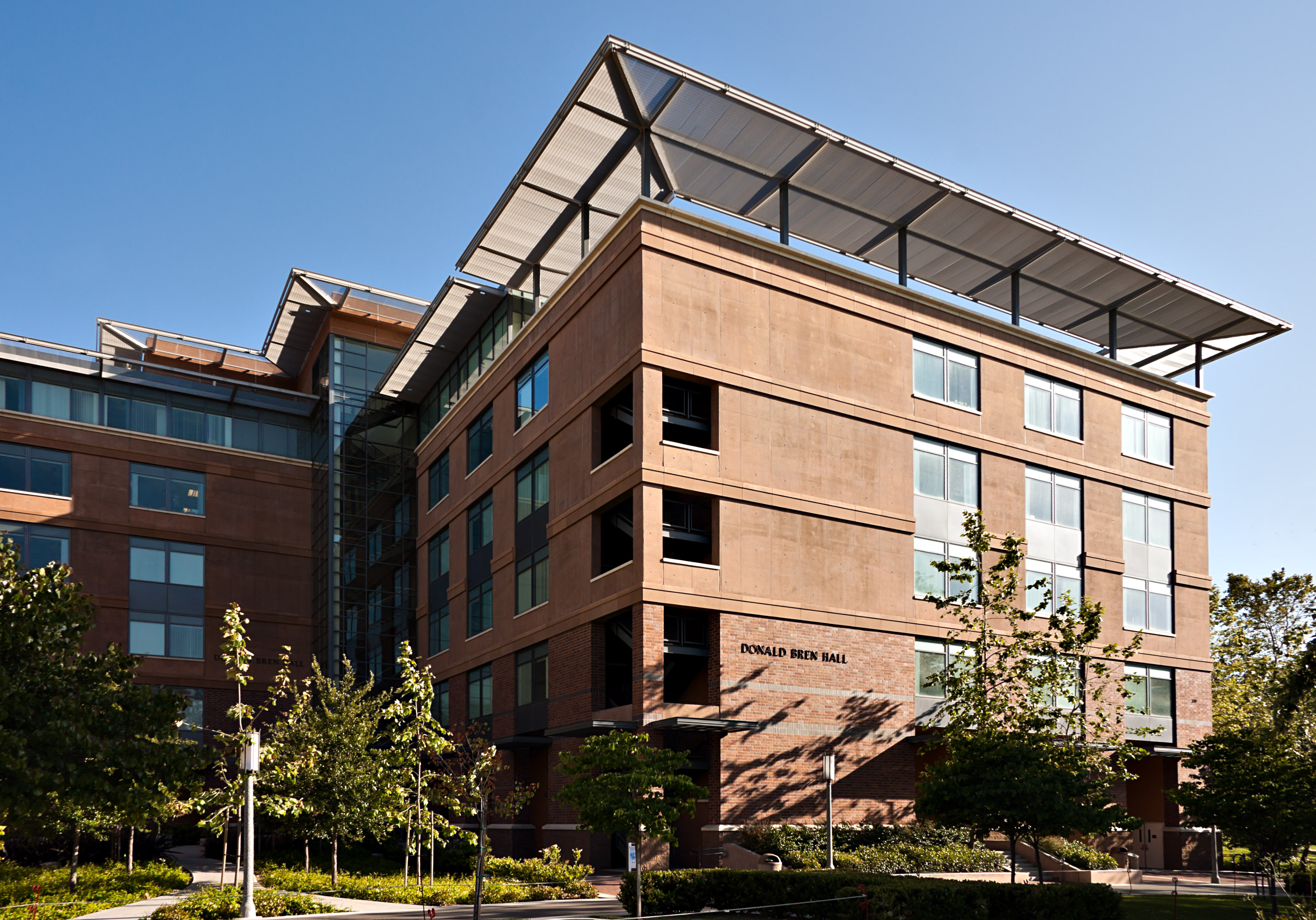
- Donald Bren Hall, one of the buildings on the campus of the Bren School
- Type: Academic unit
- Established: 2002
- Affiliations: University of California, Irvine
- Dean: Marios Papaefthymiou
- Website: ics.uci.edu

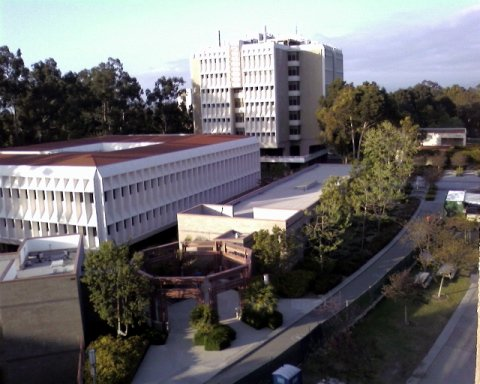
ICS buildings (center and left) viewed from the top of Bren Hall

The UC Irvine Donald Bren School of Information and Computer Sciences (ICS) is the information school of the University of California, Irvine (UCI). Consisting of nearly three thousand students, faculty, and staff, the school has three buildings in the southeast section of UCI's undergraduate campus, and maintains student body and research affiliations throughout UCI.

The school of ICS consists of three departments: Computer Science, Informatics, and Statistics. The combined groupings focus the school around the fields of computing and information processing. The departments confer eight undergraduate, eleven masters, and seven doctoral degrees in total, with some degree programs cooperating with affiliated schools.

== History ==
In 1968, three years after UCI's founding, the Department of Information and Computer Science was created as an independent department, not belonging to any school. In 2002, the 35-year-old department was elevated to school status, and its faculty were partitioned into two departments, the Department of Computer Science and the Department of Informatics. The Department of Statistics, founded earlier in 2002, was included as a third department in the newly created school.

In 2004, the school received a US$20 million anonymous donation. The donation was later revealed to be from Donald Bren, a wealthy real estate developer and head of the Irvine Company. The school was renamed in his honor.

== Academics ==
The school of ICS is one of less than fifty independent computer science schools in the United States, and the only one in the University of California system.

U.S. News & World Report ranks Bren School as 29th in the United States for Computer Science as of 2016, and 14th in public university programs. Among some ICS subareas, the school is ranked 4th in human-computer interaction, 9th in software engineering, and 8th in databases.

=== Undergraduate ===
The school possesses 8 undergraduate majors, ranging from lower level hardware to high level social computing, each providing a Bachelor of Science degree (notably, Computer Engineering is not part of ICS, and resides in the Henry Samueli School of Engineering). Out of the 8 undergraduate majors in the Donald Bren School, 3 are unique interdisciplinary studies shared between the Paul Merage School of Business, the Henry Samueli School of Engineering, and the School of Biological Sciences. The majors that are available include Biomedical Computing, Business Information Management, Computer Game Science, Computer Science, Computer Science & Engineering, Informatics, Information and Computer Science, and Software Engineering.

Non-interdisciplinary majors are:

- The school's primary major is Information and Computer Science, focused on computer science theory and software engineering. In contrast to engineering majors, additional natural sciences (such as physics) are not required to complete the major. Two upper division theoretical mathematics courses are required, along with basic calculus, linear algebra, statistics, and discrete mathematics. The program allows students more freedom to pursue a selected field in computer science. Though not required for a degree, the school certifies specializations within the major:
  - Artificial Intelligence
  - Computer Systems
  - Implementation and Analysis of Algorithms
  - Information Systems
  - Networks and Distributed Systems
  - Software Systems
- The second most popular major within the school is Computer Science, similar in composition to ICS. Though more limiting in electives, the major was formed around the recommended courses set by ACM and IEEE, and features a more classical computer science curriculum.
- Informatics, a major unique in the UC system. The higher level of social abstraction prepares students in such fields as software analysis, management, design, computer engineering interfaces.

Undergraduate interdisciplinary majors are:

- Computer Science and Engineering - hosted jointly by The Henry Samueli School of Engineering and The Donald Bren School of Information and Computer Science.
- Business Information Management (BIM) is administered by the Donald Bren School of Information and Computer Sciences as an interdisciplinary degree program with The Paul Merage School of Business.
- Biomedical Computing (BMC)

=== Graduate ===
ICS provides 11 master's level and 7 doctorate level graduate programs. Since computing is a part of many other fields (which use or interact with computing technology), ICS collaborates with other schools in many of its programs.

The Department of Computer Science offers a general major to those who have no specialized field, and is awarded as Information and Computer Science (M.S.). Computer Science (M.S., Ph.D.) allows for a wide range of fields, similar to the general degree; however, doctoral degrees require a particular research interest within the field, unlike the general degree. Embedded Systems (M.S.) more narrowly focuses students on the implementation of specialized computer systems. Knowledge Discovery and Data (M.S.) applies to informatics fields like information processing and to computer science fields such as artificial intelligence.

The Department of Informatics offers its own general degree Informatics Track in General Informatics (M.S., Ph.D.), however doctoral candidates must have a specific research interest. Informatics Track in Interactive and Collaborative Technology (M.S., Ph.D.) narrows its general degree to the field of human–computer interaction, with end parties as wholly human or man and machine. Software engineering is researched under the Informatics Track in Software (M.S., Ph.D.) degree, as software development processes are directly related to human interaction and information systems.

Three multi-discipline fields exist, spread across more than one school. Networked Systems (M.S., Ph.D.) involves both the School of Engineering and the school of ICS. The research area covers high and low levels of telecommunications and computer networks. Arts Computation Engineering (M.S.), as its name suggests, covers both the School of Engineering and the Claire Trevor School of the Arts in addition to ICS. The field relies heavily on high level informatics principles, applying science to the arts. Informatics in Biology & Medicine (M.S., Ph.D.), requires classes within the wide fields of Biology. Research may range from microscopic systems, such as proteins, or macro-level systems, such as populations.

Though the Department of Statistics currently has no undergraduate degrees, it offers one graduate program: Statistics (M.S., Ph.D.). The graduate program may help model many different problems, and is highly applicable to researchers in other fields such as economics and biology.

== People ==
The current dean of the Bren School is Marios Papaefthymiou. Papaefthymiou is a professor of computer science and, as dean, he holds the Ted and Janice Smith Family Foundation endowed chair in ICS.

Noteworthy alumni have graduated from the school, including: Roy Fielding, co-creator of Hypertext Transfer Protocol and the Apache HTTP Server; Patrick Hanratty, CAD pioneer; Paul Mockapetris, creator of Domain Name System and the first Simple Mail Transfer Protocol server; Steven Joe, CEO of D-Link North America.

== Facilities ==
The school currently has three associated buildings operational, providing over 100,000 square feet (10,000 m^{2}) of space. Labs are located in each building, with over 500 administered computers total. All buildings are positioned adjacent to the School of Engineering at the South-East side of UCI's undergraduate campus.

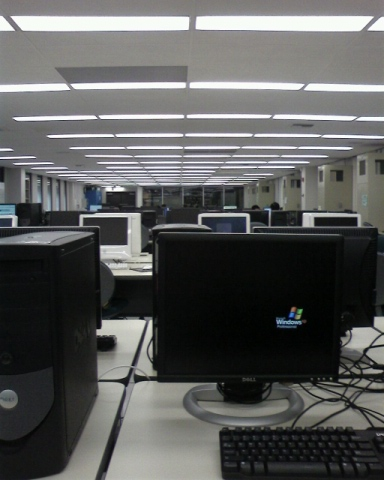
Computer lab, ICS364, with server room in the very back behind glass windows

The Information and Computer Science building (ICS), previously named the Computer Science building, is the primary facility for undergraduate instruction, consisting 24,416 square feet (2,268 m^{2}) on 4 floors, opposite to the Engineering Tower (ET). The bottom (and first) floor links physically to ET's bottom floor, while the second floor shares the same plaza with the ET. The bottom floor consists of three instructional labs, CS183, CS189, and CS192—each lab contains 45 Microsoft Windows Server machines, used primarily as desktops for first year undergraduates. Lab CS193 is used for business related software projects for upper division undergraduates, and holds 24 Windows machines. Both the first and second floors contain instruction halls and classrooms, while the third and fourth primarily contain meeting and faculty offices, except for CS364.

The building also has the largest computer lab, ICS364, containing 117 Windows, 12 OS X, 12 Solaris Java boxes, and 11 Linux Network Stations. Each Network Station includes 4 Dell PC with Linux operation systems, 4 Cisco routers, and 4 Netgear Ethernet Hubs. The lab is also located next to the air conditioned server room, visible to each other through a large window.

Information and Computer Science 2 (ICS2), is a narrow computing facility surrounding the South-East side of the ICS tower. ICS2 houses graduate offices in 9,731 square feet (904 m^{2}) of space. It is also home to the Human Computer Interaction lab.

Donald Bren Hall is the latest addition to the school, completed in early 2007. It consists of 87,000 square feet (8,100 m^{2}), making it the largest building in the ICS family. It houses offices for many ICS faculty and staff, in addition to the 4 lecture halls and 10 classrooms.

Two former buildings, the Frank Gehry-designed ICS Engineering Research Facility (IERF, a 9,954-square-foot (925 m^{2}) laboratory facility, with an added instruction hall and classroom) and Computer Science/Engineering (CS/E, a 6,681-square-foot (621 m^{2}) office and facility building near Bren Hall and IERF) were demolished in January 2007.

== Associated bodies ==
=== Research organizations ===
ICS helped found the Ada Byron Research Center (ABRC), which helps minorities in the field of Computer Science. Named in honor of the 19th century female mathematician Ada Lovelace, ABRC aims at not only increases minority researchers, but closing the digital divide. The current director is the Dean Richardson of ICS.

The California Institute for Telecommunications and Information Technology (Calit2), is a multidisciplinary research organization within the University of California. UC Irvine and UC San Diego currently house the two Calit2 buildings. Space at Irvine's Calit2 building is provided to any collaborative project that fits within Calit2's goals.

LUCI, the Laboratory for Ubiquitous Computing and Interaction, is a computing research center.

Connected Learning Lab (CLL), directed by Mimi Ito researches, designs, & mobilizes learning technologies in equitable, innovative, and learner-centered ways.

=== Student organizations ===
The ICS Student Council is the official student government of the school. It acts as an umbrella organization over all ICS student organizations. It hosts regular social, professional development, and networking events, including the yearly ICS Week. It also maintains and operates multiple open-source projects.

The ICS House is a 2-story on-campus house located within UCI's Arroyo Vista housing community. ICS House accepts a limited number (approx. 16) of students from the school of ICS or outstanding applicant, based upon an application process.

UC Irvine ACM (ACM) is UCI's student chapter of the Association for Computing Machinery. The chapter hosts regular meetings and competes in competitive programming contests including the International Collegiate Programming Contest.

Women in Information and Computer Sciences (WICS) is a student run organization to help and encourage women in the fields related to computer science.

Cyber at UCI (Cyber@UCI) is a cybersecurity-focused club which hosts regular events and competes at competitions including the National Collegiate Cyber Defense Competition.

Management Information Student Society (MAISS) is a student-run organization for students interested in technology and business.
