= Marion Jorgensen =

American philanthropist (1912–2008)

Marion Newbert Jorgensen (March 18, 1912 – June 18, 2008) was an American civic leader in Los Angeles and a philanthropist.

== Early life and marriages ==
Jorgensen was born to a well-to-do family in Chicago, Illinois, the daughter of Nellie and Leroy Newbert. Her family's wealth can be attributed to her grandfather, Thomas Griffin, an Irish immigrant, who was the founder of a very successful company which manufactured railway wheels in Baltimore. In 1913, her family traveled west to Los Angeles by private railroad car. Marion attended Marlborough School, a college-preparatory academy. She obtained her pilot license by the age of 17, and went on to attend the liberal-arts Finch College in New York City.

In 1930, she returned to Los Angeles and, despite being Christian and attending exclusive schools which restricted their enrollees to gentiles, she married Jewish-American talent agent, Milton Harold Bren. Bren would go on to become a movie producer and real estate developer. They had two sons: Donald Bren, who later became chairman of the Irvine Company in Newport Beach, California, and Peter Bren, who later became a senior partner with KBS Investors in New York City. In the 1940s, while Europe was at war, Marion founded the "Bundles for Britain" (note: Lady Malcolm Douglas-Hamilton was also credited with founding Bundles for Britain in 1940);) organization, which provided non-military aid to the British people. Women joined the organization and made clothing, which was sent overseas. Upon the entrance of the United States into the war, Bundles for Britain evolved into the United States Naval Aide Auxiliary. Marion served as president of the organization.

In 1948, the couple divorced. Marion then married Tom Call, the son of Asa Call, chairman of the Pacific Mutual Life Company and to whom the rapid ascent of Richard Nixon from representative to president is widely attributed. They divorced in 1952.

Marion began doing volunteer work for the American Red Cross, where she met Danish American steel entrepreneur Earle M. Jorgensen through Hollywood connections. They were married in 1953 and remained married until his death in 1999. Jorgensen, the son of Danish immigrants to San Francisco, made his fortune by selling surplus steel to oil drillers and later in the aircraft industry. He eventually turned his company, the Earle M. Jorgensen Company, to a $100 million in sales by 1960.

== Socialite and philanthropy ==
The Jorgensens were among the social elite of Los Angeles. She began working with St. John's Health Center in Santa Monica, where she coordinated events and recruited volunteers. She hosted the dinner for Prince Charles, as well as the Black and White Ball with Bob Hope.

The Jorgensens became good friends with Ronald and Nancy Reagan in the early 1960s. Earle Jorgensen urged Ronald Reagan to run for Governor of California in 1966, a position Reagan won. Earle Jorgensen would later become a member of Reagan's White House "Kitchen Cabinet". The Jorgensens became very active philanthropists; they donated money to many charitable causes and civic organizations, such as the Boy Scouts of America, the YMCA, the Los Angeles Music Center, and several hospitals.

The Jorgensens supported the California Institute of Technology, and established the Earle and Marion Jorgensen Scholarship Fund as a means to assist students. It helps undergraduates financially. Caltech President David Baltimore said, "We are truly grateful to Earle and to his wife, Marion, for their many years of friendship and support."

Included among the other philanthropic endeavors that benefited from Mrs. Jorgensen's support over the years were the Los Angeles Orphanage Guild, the ARCS Foundation, the American Red Cross, Loyola Marymount University, and the Prince of Wales Foundation.

== Committee and board work ==
Jorgensen served on the First Step Committee at St. John's and co-chaired the Campaign Cabinet to lead the Campaign for St. John's. She served as a leader on many important committees including the Board Affairs and the Executive Committee. With her assistance, the small community hospital was able to rebuild from the 1994 Northridge earthquake. Additionally, Mrs. Jorgensen was an Honorary Trustee of Children's Hospital Los Angeles and served on the board of The Colleagues.

After serving with distinction on the Los Angeles World Affairs Council, Mrs. Jorgensen was honored with election as Life Director. She also became the first female to serve as chairman of the board of overseers of the Huntington Library Art Gallery and Botanical Gardens in San Marino, California. For her help and service in developing the world-famous botanical gardens, she was elected Trustee Emeritus.

Jorgensen also had musical interests. She served as director of the Los Angeles Symphony Association, on the President's Blue Ribbon 400 for the Los Angeles Music Center, and was a member of the Board of Trustees of the John F. Kennedy Center for the Performing Arts. She helped found the James Madison Council of the Library of Congress, the first-ever national advisory and support group in its 205-year history.

Marion Jorgensen also served as a member of the board of Continental Airlines and Frontier Airlines.

== Later life and death ==
Jorgensen's husband Earle died in 1999. Throughout May 2007, Mrs. Jorgensen donated roughly $7,000 to the 2008 presidential campaign of John McCain. In October of that year, Mrs. Jorgensen was honored by the St. John's Health Center Foundation Board of Trustees with the Spirit of St. John's Award in recognition of her lifelong contributions to the center. The award honors an individual whose vision, determination and generosity of spirit have advanced the mission of St. John's.

Marion Jorgensen died on June 18, 2008, at St. John's Health Center, the very place where she volunteered often. She was 96. Jorgensen was survived by her sons, Peter Bren and Donald Bren, four Jorgensen children, and many grandchildren and great-grandchildren.
